= List of Kwansei Gakuin University people =

People associated with Kwansei Gakuin University.

== Faculty ==
- Dries van Agt (honorary degree) - Visiting Professor
- Gaku Konishi - Physics professor
- Takao Nishizeki - Professor (?-2015)
- Yukihiro Ozaki - Dean of the School of Science and Technology

=== Nobel laureates ===
- Reona Esaki (PhD 1959 Tokyo) – Physics (1973), Visiting Professor (1978–1982)

=== Japan Academy members ===
==== Imperial Prize and Japan Academy Prize winners ====
- Mataji Miyamoto- Economic History (1971), Professor (Business Administration)

==== Japan Academy Prize winners ====
- Hiroshi Takemoto (PhD 1996 Osaka City) – Economic History (1999)
- Rainosuke Awano (M.A.) – European History (1951), Professor (Humanities, 1951–)

==== Non-winning members ====
- Tsuneo Hori (PhD) – Economic History (1966), President (1955–1966), Dean (Economics, 1954–1955), Lecturer (1934–)

== Alumni/ae ==
=== Academia ===
==== Japan Academy Prize winners ====
- Manabu Yunoki (B.A. 1953, M.A. 1956, PhD 1959) – Economic History (1982)
- Akihiro Amano (PhD 1966 Osaka, 1963 Rochester) – Councilor, Central Council on the Environment, Dean (Policy Studies), Professor
- Kazuo Hiramatsu – Chapter Executive Director, Institute of Management Accountant, Councilor, Council on Corporate Accounting (2001–2007), Member, Inspecting and Examining Committee on Certified Public Accountants (2004–2007), President (2002–)

=== Government, law, and politics ===
==== Ministers and Directors General ====
- Yuriko Koike (Withdrawal 1971) – Minister of Defense, Japanese Representative from Tokyo 10th electoral district (LDP, 2005–)
- Hyosuke Niwa (Withdrawal 1931) – Minister of Labor (1988–1989), Director General of Okinawa Development Agency (1982–1983), Director General of the Management and Coordination Agency (1982–1983), Director General of the National Land Agency (1974)
- Kazuo Nagae (A.A. 1924) – Minister of Agriculture, Forestry and Fisheries (1948)
- Ryutaro Nagai (Diploma 1901) – Minister of Railways (1939–1940), Minister of Communication (1937–1939), Minister of Colonial Affairs (1932–1934), Imperial Japanese Representative from Ishikawa Prefecture's electoral district (IRAA, Minsei Party, 1920–1944)

==== Councillors ====
- Shinsuke Suematsu (B.A. 1979) – Japanese Councillor from Hyogo Prefecture-wide electoral district (LDP, 2004–)
- Yoko Fujiki (B.A. 1956) – Japanese Representative from Kinki Bloc proportional electoral district (JCP, 1996–2003)
- Hirobumi Daimatsu (Diploma 1941) – Japanese Councillor from the nationwide electoral district (LDP, 1968–), head coach, Japan women's national volleyball team (Gold Medalist, 1964 Summer Olympic)

==== Representatives ====
- Yoshihiro Seki (B.A. 1989) – Japanese Representative from Hyogo 3rd electoral district (LDP, 2005–)
- Takashi Yano (B.A. 1983) – Japanese Representative from Kinki Bloc Proportional electoral district (LDP, 2005–)
- Peng Ming-min (Diploma 1940) – ROC (Taiwanese) presidential candidate (DPP, 1996)
- Mai Ohara – Japanese Representative from Kyoto 5th electoral district (DPJ, 2009–12)

=== Business ===
- Kazutomo Robert Hori (B.A. 1989) – founder and CEO, Cybird Co., Ltd.
- Akira Miyahara (B.A. 1962) – former Vice Chairman of the Board, Fuji Xerox Co., Ltd.
- Yoshihiko Miyauchi (B.A. 1958) – Chairman of the Board and CEO, Orix Corp.
- Yoichi Morishita (B.A. 1957) – Chairman of the Board, Matsushita Electric Industrial Co., Ltd. (Panasonic)

=== Entertainment ===
- Takashige Ichise (Withdrawal 1983) – film producer, Premonition (Yogen) (2004), Dark Water (2002)
- Etsushi Toyokawa (Withdrawal 1981) – actor, No Way Back (1995), Angel Dust (1994)
- Hidekazu Tanaka (B.A. 1978) – ballroom dancer (3rd, 1997 Dancesport World Champions; 5th, 1998 DWC), Shall We Dance? (1996)
- Toru "Tiger" Okoshi (B.A. 1972) – jazz trumpeter, [Professor], Berklee College of Music; Yamaha artist
- Tadao Takashima (Withdrawal 1951) – former MC and actor, Son of Godzilla 1967 (1969)

=== Athletics and sports ===
- Rui Komatsu (2005)- forward, Cerezo Osaka (2006–), V-Varen Nagasaki (loaned, 2006)
- Hiroki Kishida (2004) – forward, Fagiano Okayama F.C. (2010–), Vissel Kobe (2004, 2007–2009), YKK AP F.C. (2005–2006)
- Daisuke Aono (2002)- midfield, Ehime F.C. (2007–2009), Albirex Niigata (2005–2006), Vissel Kobe (2004), Gamba Osaka (2002–2003)
- Kenji Miyazaki (2000) – forward, Kyoto Purple Sanga (2000–2001)
- Shinzo Yamada (B.A. 1996) – linebacker, Memphis Maniax (XFL, 2001)
- So Taguchi (B.A. 1992) – outfielder, Orix Buffaloes (Nippon Professional Baseball, 2010–), Chicago Cubs (Major League Baseball, 2009), Philadelphia Phillies (MLB, 2008), St. Louis Cardinals (MLB, 2002–2007), Orix BlueWave (NPB, 1992–2002), Japanese national baseball team (4th, 2000 Summer Olympics)
- Daisuke Tsutsui (B.A. 1980) – infielder, Japan national baseball team (Silver Medalist, 1988 Summer Olympics)
- Shu Kamo (B.A. 1964) – head coach, Japan national football team (1994–1997)
- Ken Naganuma (B.A. 1953) – head coach, Japan national football team (Bronze Medalist, 1968 Summer Olympics; 1962–1969, 1972–1976)
- Ura Kazuki (2015) – maegashira, professional sumo wrestler (2015–)
- Kenro Nakajima (2008)– alpinist and cameraman (lost on K2 2024)
