= Julie Remache =

American economist

Julie Ann Remache
- Education: Boston University
- Occupations: Economist; Trader and Analyst
- Notable work: The Financial Market Effects of the Federal Reserve's Large-Scale Asset Purchases; Overnight RRP operations as a Monetary Policy Tool: Some Design Considerations

Julie Ann Remache is an American economist who currently works as selected deputy SOMA manager at the Federal Reserve of New York. Remache has worked at the Federal Reserve of New York since 2000, where she held several positions before being promoted to Senior VP in February 2015. She briefly worked in the private sector between 2008-2009, but returned to the Federal Reserve in January 2009 as Director for Portfolio Analytics. In this position, Remache was part of a team responsible for buying $1.25 trillion of mortgage-backed securities (MBS) as part of the Federal Reserve's MBS purchase program during the 2008 financial crisis.

== Education ==
Remache obtained her bachelor's degree in Mathematics and Economics at Boston University. Remache then went on to complete a master's in Economics at Boston University as well. She holds a Chartered Financial Analyst (CFA) certification.

== Career ==
Remache joined the Federal Reserve of New York in 2000 as a trader and analyst. In January 2008 she was promoted to Markets Officer but shortly after, in March 2008, she took a job at Robeco-Sage Capital Management as Vice President. After nine months at Robeco-Sage, Richard Dzina, senior VP at the New York Fed, offered her a new position at the Bank. Remache accepted the position and returned to the Bank in January 2009, where she was responsible for developing and implementing the Federal Reserve's MBS purchase program. In January 2010 she was promoted to Assistant Vice President of the Markets Groups. In February 2015 she was promoted to her current position of Senior Vice President in the Markets Group. In 2011, Remache appeared on The Invention of Money episode of NPR's This American Life, where she discussed how, starting in November 2008, her Domestic Capital Markets team at the Federal Reserve injected $1.35 trillion into the economy by purchasing mortgage-backed securities.

In July 2015 she presented on monetary policy at the National Association for Business Economics (NABE) 16th annual Economic Measurement Conference in Washington D.C. In May 2016, she organised a conference at Columbia University on the topic of the implementation of monetary policy after the 2008 financial crisis.

== Select research ==
Remache's research primarily focuses on the Federal Reserve's large-scale asset purchases (otherwise known as quantitative easing) during the 2008 financial crisis. She has published two papers on the topic with Joseph Gagnon, Matthew Raskin and Brian Sack: "The financial market effects of the Federal Reserve’s large-scale asset purchases" and "Large-scale asset purchases by the Federal Reserve: did they work?" Remache published an article for Medium in 2017 along with Antoine Martin, Senior VP and Head of Money and Payments at the Federal Reserve. She has contributed to the Federal Reserve's Liberty Street Economics blog on several occasions on the topic of System Open Market Account (SOMA).

== Publications ==
=== Bank and journal publications ===
- Frost, J., Logan, L., Martin, A., McCabe P. E., Natalucci, F. M., & Remache, J. (2015). "Overnight RRP Operations as a Monetary Policy Tool: Some Design Considerations." Finance and Economics Discussion Series 2015-010. Washington: Board of Governors of the Federal Reserve System. http://dx.doi.org/10.17016/FEDS.2015.010.
- Brown, S. T., Steinberg-Ezer, M., Mosser, P. C., Sack, B. P., Remache, J., Clouse, J., . . . Rodrigues, T. A. (2015). "Large-Scale Asset Purchases: Recent Experience and Some Policy Considerations Staff of the Board of Governors of the Federal Reserve System and the Federal Reserve."
- Gagnon, J. E., Raskin M., Remache, J., & Sack, B. P. (May 2011). "Large-Scale Asset Purchases by the Federal Reserve: Did They Work?" The Federal Reserve Bank of New York, Economic Policy Review, 41-59.
- Gagnon, J. E., Raskin M., Remache, J., & Sack, B. P. (March 2011). "The Financial Market Effects of the Federal Reserve’s Large-Scale Asset Purchases." The Federal Reserve of New York, International Journal of Central Banking, 7, 3-43.
- Gagnon, J. E., Raskin M., Remache, J., & Sack, B. P. (March 2010). "Large-Scale Asset Purchases by the Federal Reserve: Did They Work?" The Federal Reserve Bank of New York, Staff Reports No. 441.

=== Blog posts ===
- Martin, A., Mosser, P. C., & Remache, J. (2016, July 15). "Implementing Monetary Policy Post-Crisis: What Do We Need to Know?" Federal Reserve Bank of New York, Liberty Street Economics [Blog post]. http://libertystreeteconomics.newyorkfed.org/2016/07/implementing-monetary-policy-post-crisis-what-do-we-need-to-know.html.
- Del Negro, M., McAndrews J. J., & Remache, J. (2013, August 15). "More Than Meets the Eye: Some Fiscal Implications of Monetary Policy." Federal Reserve Bank of New York, Liberty Street Economics [Blog post]. https://libertystreeteconomics.newyorkfed.org/2013/08/more-than-meets-the-eye-some-fiscal-implications-of-monetary-policy.html
- Fleming, M. J., Leonard, D., Long, G., & Remache, J. (2013, August 14). "What If? A Counterfactual SOMA Portfolio." Federal Reserve Bank of New York, Liberty Street Economics [Blog post]. https://libertystreeteconomics.newyorkfed.org/2013/08/what-if-a-counterfactual-soma-portfolio.html
- Bukhari, M., Cambron, A., Del Negro, M., & Remache, J. (2013, August 13). "A History of SOMA Income." Federal Reserve Bank of New York, Liberty Street Economics [Blog post]. https://libertystreeteconomics.newyorkfed.org/2013/08/a-history-of-soma-income.html
- Bukhari, M., Cambron, A., Fleming, M. J., McCarthy J., & Remache, J. (2013, August 12). "The SOMA Portfolio Through Time." Federal Reserve Bank of New York, Liberty Street Economics [Blog post]. https://libertystreeteconomics.newyorkfed.org/2013/08/the-soma-portfolio-through-time.html
