= Torre Glòries =

Skyscraper in Catalonia, Spain

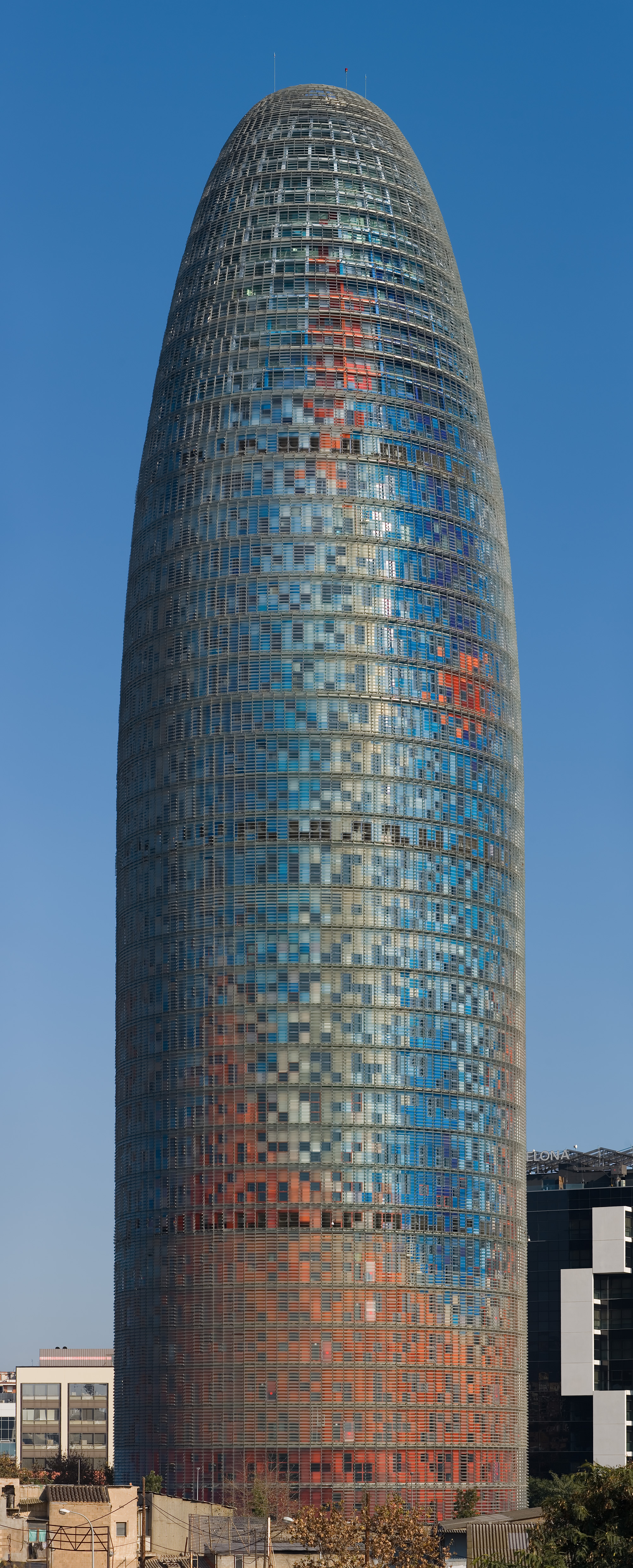
- Torre Agbar, 2007

General information
- Type: Office, conference
- Location: Barcelona, Catalonia, Spain
- Coordinates: 41°24′12″N 02°11′22″E
- Construction started: 1999
- Completed: 2004
- Opening: June 2005
- Cost: €130,000,000
- Owner: Merlin Properties

Height
- Roof: 144.44 m (473.88 ft)
- Top floor: 128.3 m (421 ft)

Technical details
- Floor count: 33
- Floor area: 51,483 m^{2} (554,158 sq ft)
- Lifts/elevators: 9

Design and construction
- Architects: Jean Nouvel and Fermín Vázquez
- Structural engineer: Brufau & A. Obiol
- Awards: International Highrise Award; 2006

The Torre Glòries (Catalan pronunciation: [ˈtorə ˈɣlɔɾiəs]), formerly known as Torre Agbar (pronounced [ˈtorə əɡˈbaɾ]), is a 38-storey skyscraper located between Avinguda Diagonal and Carrer Badajoz, near Plaça de les Glòries Catalanes, which marks the gateway to the new technological district of Barcelona, Catalonia, Spain. It was designed by French architect Jean Nouvel in association with the Spanish firm b720 Fermín Vázquez Arquitectos and built by Dragados. The Torre Glòries is located in the Poblenou neighbourhood of Barcelona and it was originally named after its owners, the Agbar Group, a holding company whose interests include the Barcelona water company Aigües de Barcelona.

The tower is 144.44 m high with a diameter of 39 m. It has a total of 50,693 m^{2} (545,650 sq ft), of which 30,000 m^{2} (320,000 sq ft) are offices, 3,210 m^{2} (34,600 sq ft) technical facilities, 8,132 m^{2} (87,530 sq ft) services, including an auditorium, and 9,132 m^{2} (98,300 sq ft) parking space. It cost €130 million to build.

It opened in June 2005 and was officially opened by King Juan Carlos I on 16 September 2005. It is one in a collection of high-tech architecture examples in Barcelona.

The building was owned by the multinational group Agbar, which has its corporate headquarters in the building and which takes up most of the floors, leasing the remainder. The Agbar Tower was acquired in March 2010 for 165 million euros, after reaching an agreement with its former owner, the investment group Azurelau. Azurelau had previously bought the property in mid-2007. The purchase price was not disclosed.

By 2017 it was purchased by Merlin Properties real estate group and it was renamed as Torre Glòries after the name of the adjacent square.

== Design ==
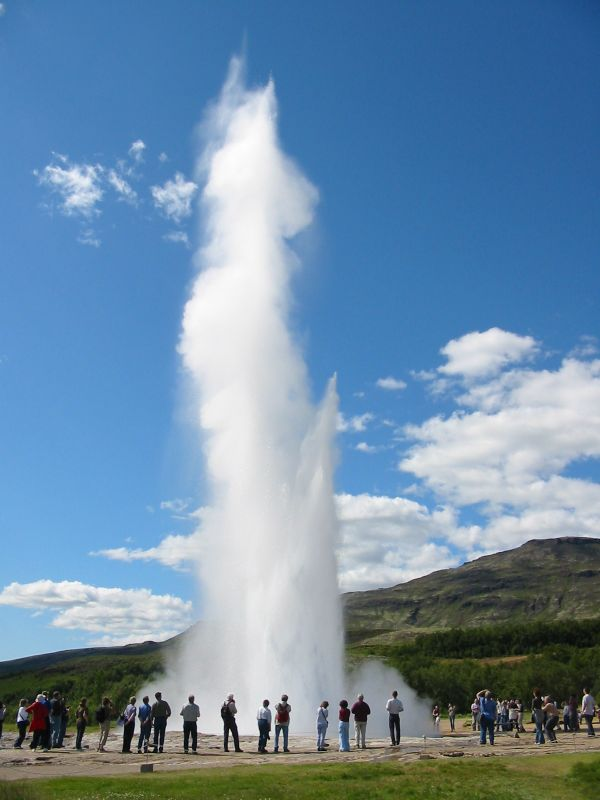
Geyser rising into the air.

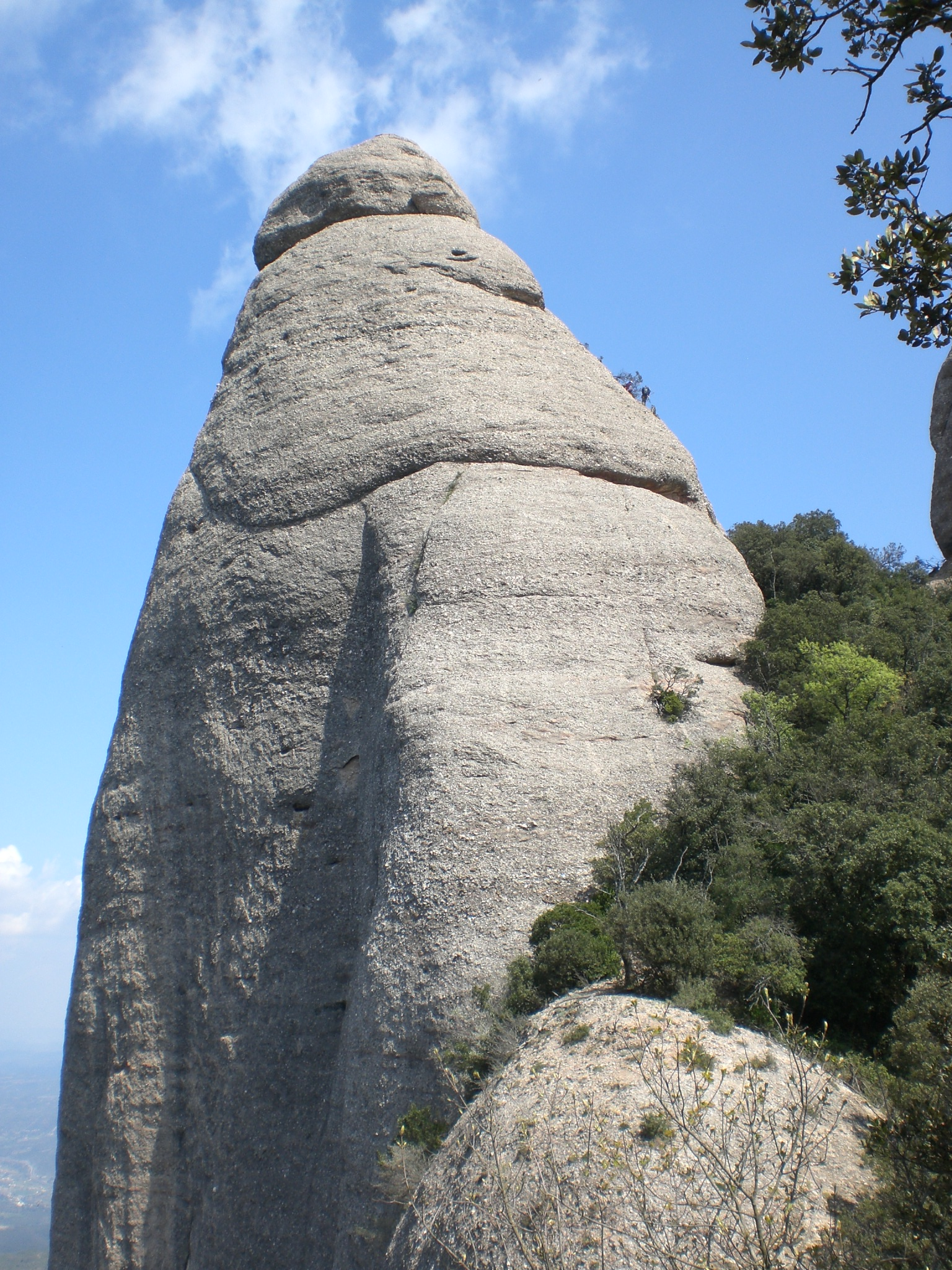
The unique rock formations of Montserrat which the building takes inspiration from.

According to Jean Nouvel, Torre Agbar is intended to recall the shape of a geyser rising into the air. It was inspired by Montserrat, a mountain near Barcelona. In an interview, he described the tower as having a phallic character. As a result of its unusual shape, the building is known by several nicknames, such as el supositori ("the suppository"), l'obús ("the shell") and some more scatological ones. It is also somewhat similar in shape to Sir Norman Foster's 30 St. Mary Axe in London, often called "the Gherkin". The Agbar Tower measures 144.4 m (473 ft 9 in) in height and consists of 38 storeys, including four underground levels.

Its design combines a number of different architectural concepts, resulting in a striking structure built with reinforced concrete, covered with a facade of glass, and over 4,500 window openings cut out of the structural concrete. The building stands out in Barcelona; it is the third tallest building in the city, after the Arts Hotel and the Mapfre Tower, which both stand 154 m (505 ft) tall.

A defining feature of the building is its nocturnal illumination. It has 4,500 LED devices that allow generation of luminous images on its façade. In addition, the outside of the tower has temperature sensors that regulate the opening and closing of the window blinds of the façade, reducing the consumption of energy for air conditioning. It houses the head office of the Aigües de Barcelona Group, the water supply company of Barcelona.

Height comparison between the Sagrada Família and the Torre Glories

As explained by Nouvel himself, the construction was strongly influenced by one of the most representative symbols of Catalan culture. One side references the bell towers of the Sagrada Familia by the Catalan architect Antoni Gaudí. (These bell towers were based in turn on the idea of the Hotel Attraction, a course project by the teacher Reus in 1908 for some New York hoteliers, which was redesigned in 1956 by his disciple Joan Matamala. These designs were included in Rem Koolhaas' book Delirious New York, a reference for many architects.) An additional tribute to the Sagrada Família lies in the north side of the tower, which was designed with the intention of obtaining an optimal view of the cathedral.

Additionally, Nouvel was inspired by the distinctive pinnacles of the Montserrat mountain range, which are of great significance for the people of Catalonia, as Montserrat houses their patron saint, Our Lady of Montserrat.

In designing the Agbar Tower, Nouvel said he rejected the prevailing North American opinion of what a skyscraper should look like. It was the architect's intention to give the impression of land that is emerging out of the ground in a particular fashion. The use of the tower by a water utility company led him to the design of a metaphor of a geyser sprouting from the deep sea.

=== Construction ===
Starting in mid-1999, when activities were initiated for preparing the site, Dragados's, construction project dragged on for nearly six years, finally ending in late 2004. Approximately 1170 workers were engaged in its construction.

== Features ==
=== Materials ===
The main materials used in the construction of the building are concrete which comprises the structure of the tower and aluminium and glass in the form of 59,619 strips of painted sheet metal of different colours, covering the approximately 16,000 m^{2} of exterior surface. In addition, the glass has different inclinations and opacities which, combined with the different shades of aluminium, alter the colour balance of the tower as a function of time of day and season of the year.

The construction used 25,000 m^{3} of concrete and 125 tonnes of steel.

=== Form and structure ===
The tower is made up of two concentric concrete oval cylinders which do not come in contact with each other. The outer cylinder, which completely encases the inner cylinder is covered by a dome of glass and steel which gives the tower its characteristic shape of a bullet. This outer cylinder with a thickness of 45 cm at the base and 25 cm at the top contains approximately 4,500 windows, while the inner cylinder measuring 50 cm at the base and 30 cm at the highest point, is where the lifts, stairs and facilities are located.

=== Distribution ===
The building contains 38 floors of which 34 are above ground and four floors are underground. Two of the underground floors host an auditorium for 316 people in addition to other services areas while the other two are intended for parking. Of the 34 floors located above the ground, 28 are for offices, three are technical plants hosting building facilities, one is dedicated to multipurpose rooms, another houses the cafeteria and the last is intended to be a viewing platform just below the top of the tower.

== Lighting ==
One of the most characteristic elements of the building is its nocturnal illumination. The tower has more than 4,500 luminous devices that can operate independently using LED technology and enables the generation of images on the outside of the tower. The system is capable of creating 16 million colours, thanks to a sophisticated system of hardware and software. It has the ability to quickly transition between colours which can create a shocking effect.

During Christmas, New Year and other events the tower changes color in animated computer controlled sequences.

The unique lighting system of the building, dubbed by its creator Yann Kersalé as diffraction, who defined it as "a vaporous cloud of colour that seeks moiré", is often used in the celebration of various events such as the naming of Barcelona as the capital of the Union for the Mediterranean or the 50th anniversary of Treaty of Rome.

== A symbol of Barcelona ==
Once it was finished, the Agbar Tower quickly became an architectural icon of the city of Barcelona and one of its most famous buildings. However, it was not initially immune to criticism from citizens and experts who said that its characteristics did not fit into the architecture of Barcelona. Over time it has become one of the symbols that universally identify the Catalan capital and is one of its tourist attractions.

In mid-2008, a number of Catalan public institutions made a list that included the major cultural icons in the Autonomous Community that were meant to serve as models for tourist souvenirs which identity Catalonia, and the tower was included in it.

The popularity of the tower to tourists is such that a visit to the tower has become a part of tourist bus routes (and even the helicopter tour) and many tourists take an opportunity to visit the inside.

=== Ringing in the New Year ===
Since 2006, TV3, the main Catalan regional television service, has used the capabilities the special lighting system at the Agbar Tower offered to show end of year celebrations. This has become the venue chosen by thousands of locals and visitors to the city to welcome the New Year. This choice of the tower as an icon of the city for New Year celebrations have allowed Barcelona to begin to appear on television around the world alongside those of famous landmarks in cities such as Sydney, Madrid, Paris, London or New York City. Prior to 2006 this did not occur because the places chosen by TV3 lacked the international recognition that the Jean Nouvel tower provides.

== Mirador Torre Glòries ==
Following the acquisition of Torre Glòries by MERLIN Properties in 2017, the Mirador Torre Glòries project was launched to give visitors the opportunity to enjoy panoramic 360º views of Barcelona from a dedicated observation deck. The project was commissioned to Mediapro Exhibitions, which developed the concept of a space combining culture and leisure through a visitor experience inside the building.

Mirador Torre Glòries was designed around three distinct spaces: Hipermirador Barcelona; the 360º observation deck on the 30th floor, 125 metres above ground level; and Cloud Cities Barcelona, an immersive sculpture by Argentine artist Tomás Saraceno and his only permanent installation in Europe. Once the project was completed, the management of the space was also awarded to the Mediapro Group through Mediapro Espais.

The official inauguration of Mirador Torre Glòries took place on 19 May 2022, attended by Barcelona Mayor Ada Colau, the Minister of Culture of the Government of Catalonia, Natalia Garriga, and Barcelona City Council's Councillor for Culture, Jordi Martí. The following day, 20 May, the observation deck opened its doors to the general public for the first time, becoming a permanent visitor attraction.

During its first year of operation, the observation deck welcomed more than 100,000 visitors. According to 2025 data, this figure had risen to more than 300,000 visitors, including both local residents and international visitors. Since its opening, the venue has hosted a range of cultural and corporate events, as well as receiving several awards and recognitions in the tourism and audiovisual sectors.

In May 2024, Torre Glòries and its observation deck became members of the World Federation of Great Towers. It became the second building in Spain to join the organisation, alongside the Torre de Collserola, also located in Barcelona. In 2025, one year after joining the organisation, it was announced that Mirador Torre Glòries would host the annual World Federation of Great Towers convention, held from 1 to 5 September. The event brought together representatives of several landmark towers from around the world and coincided with significant milestones for Torre Glòries, including the 20th anniversary of its construction and the third anniversary of the opening of Mirador Torre Glòries.

On 17 January 2026, Mirador Torre Glòries hosted the first vertical towerrunning race of the 2026 Towerrunning Challenge, a competition organised by the World Federation of Great Towers. It was the only vertical race in Spain included in the official competition.

=== Spaces of Mirador Torre Glòries ===
Mirador Torre Glòries is divided into three distinct visitor experiences:

El Hipermirador Barcelona

Located on floor −1, El Hipermirador Barcelona is a space that offers visitors an immersive perspective through five installations combining art, music, big data, technology and large-scale projections exploring urban ecosystems.

El Mirador

Located on the 30th floor of Torre Glòries, 125 metres above ground level, El Mirador is a 360º observation deck offering views of some of Barcelona's most notable landmarks, including the Sagrada Família, the Mapfre Towers, Montjuïc, Tibidabo and the Mediterranean Sea, as well as some of the city's main avenues, such as Diagonal, Gran Via and Meridiana.

Cloud Cities Barcelona

Located within the dome of El Mirador is the art installation Cloud Cities Barcelona by Argentine artist Tomás Saraceno. The work occupies a volume of 130 cubic metres, and visitors can access its interior via a series of pathways at heights ranging from 4 to 10 metres above the floor of the dome.

== Curiosities ==
- The tower has been climbed four times by Alain Robert. The first, on 3 August 2006, was an action that sought to call for peace in the conflict in Lebanon. The second was in September 2007. The third was on 25 November 2016. The fourth was on 4 March 2020. He has been fined several times.
- In 2007, "Torre Agbar" was recorded in the Spanish Patent and Trademark office, by the company Aigües de Barcelona, for use as a brand of alcoholic beverages.
- In 2011, the tower received a green building award from the European Council for its energy efficiency and low CO_{2} emissions.

== Gallery ==
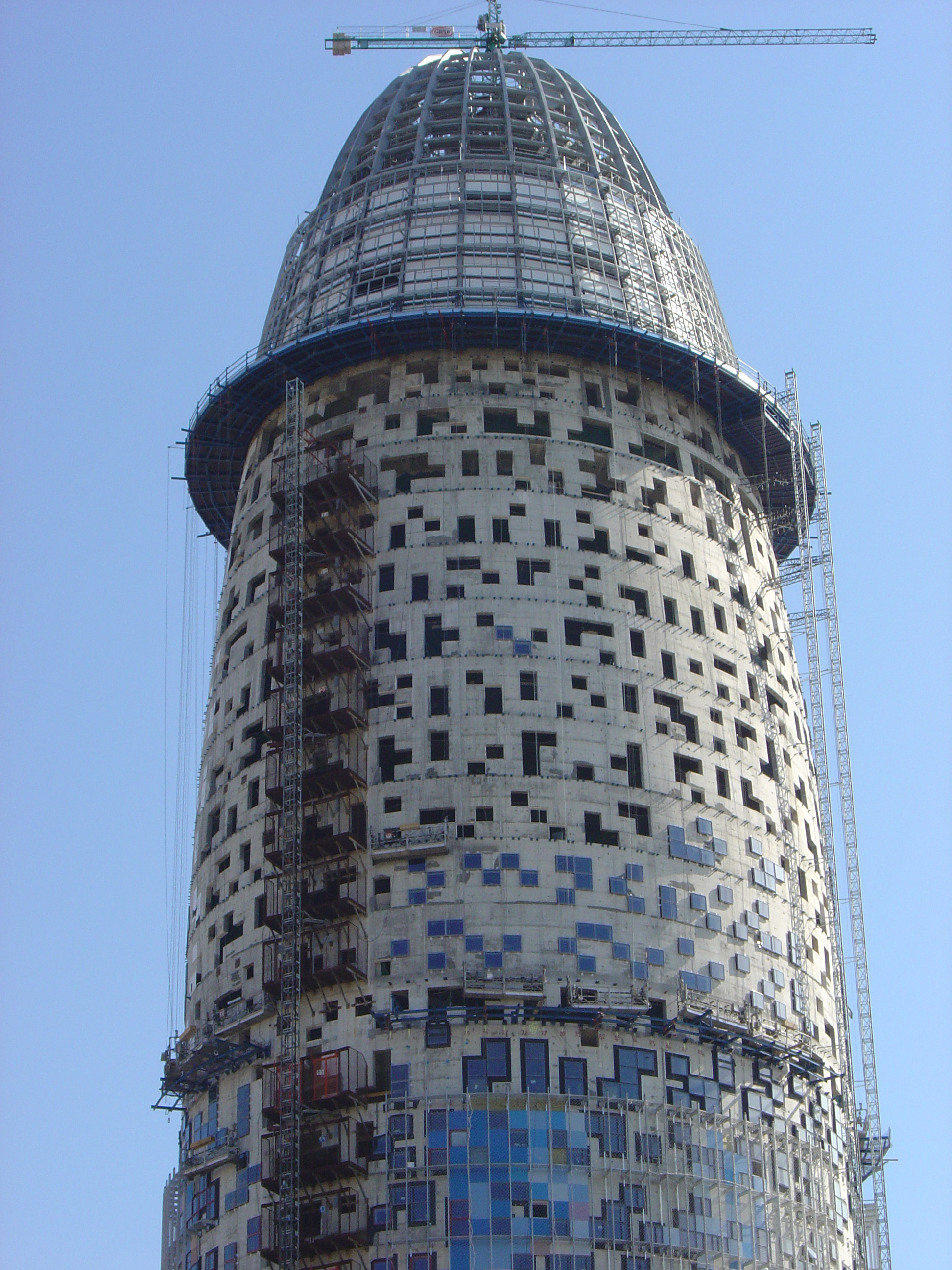
Construction work of Torre Agbar, 11 April 2004

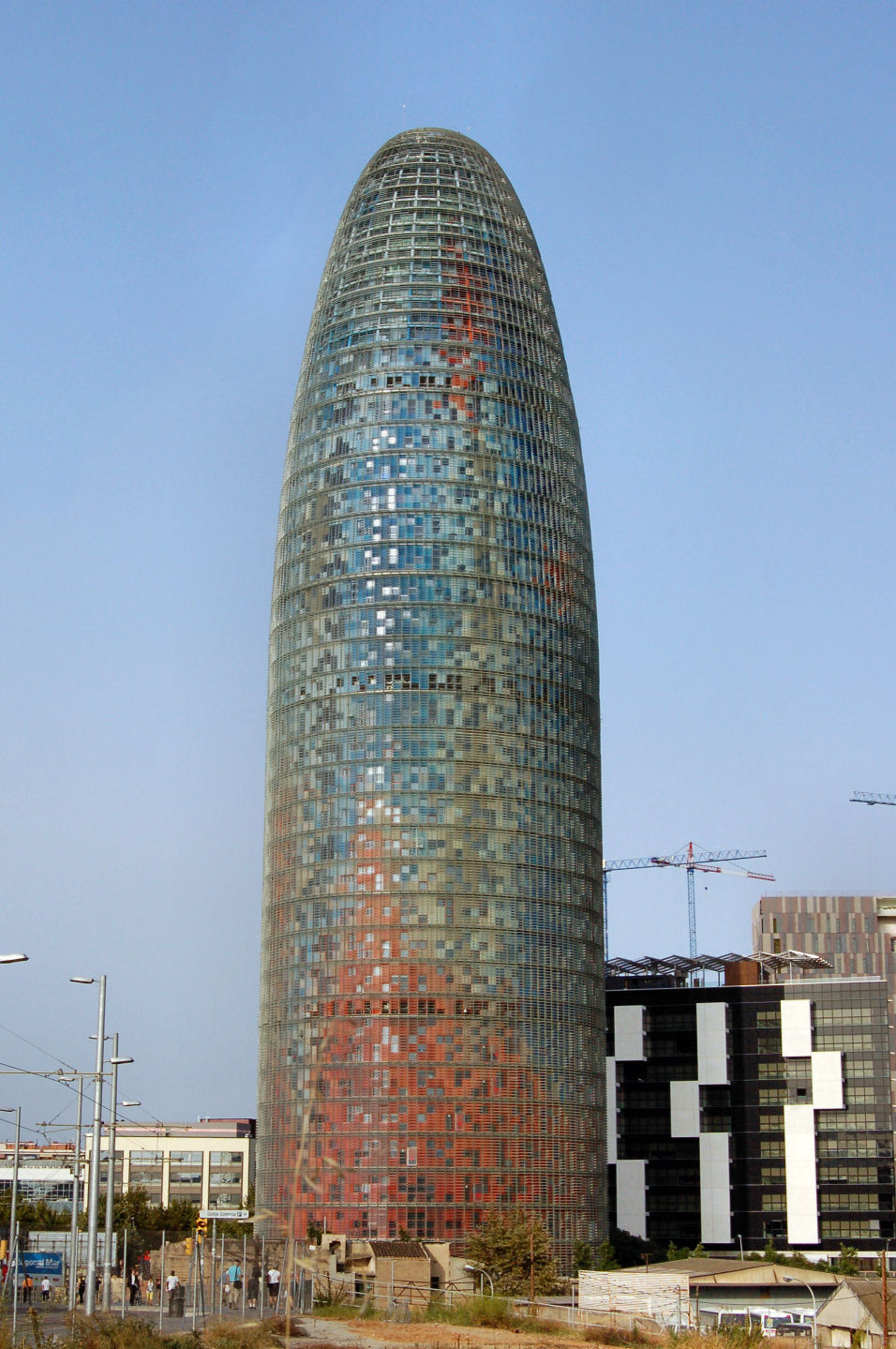
Torre Agbar, 12 September 2007

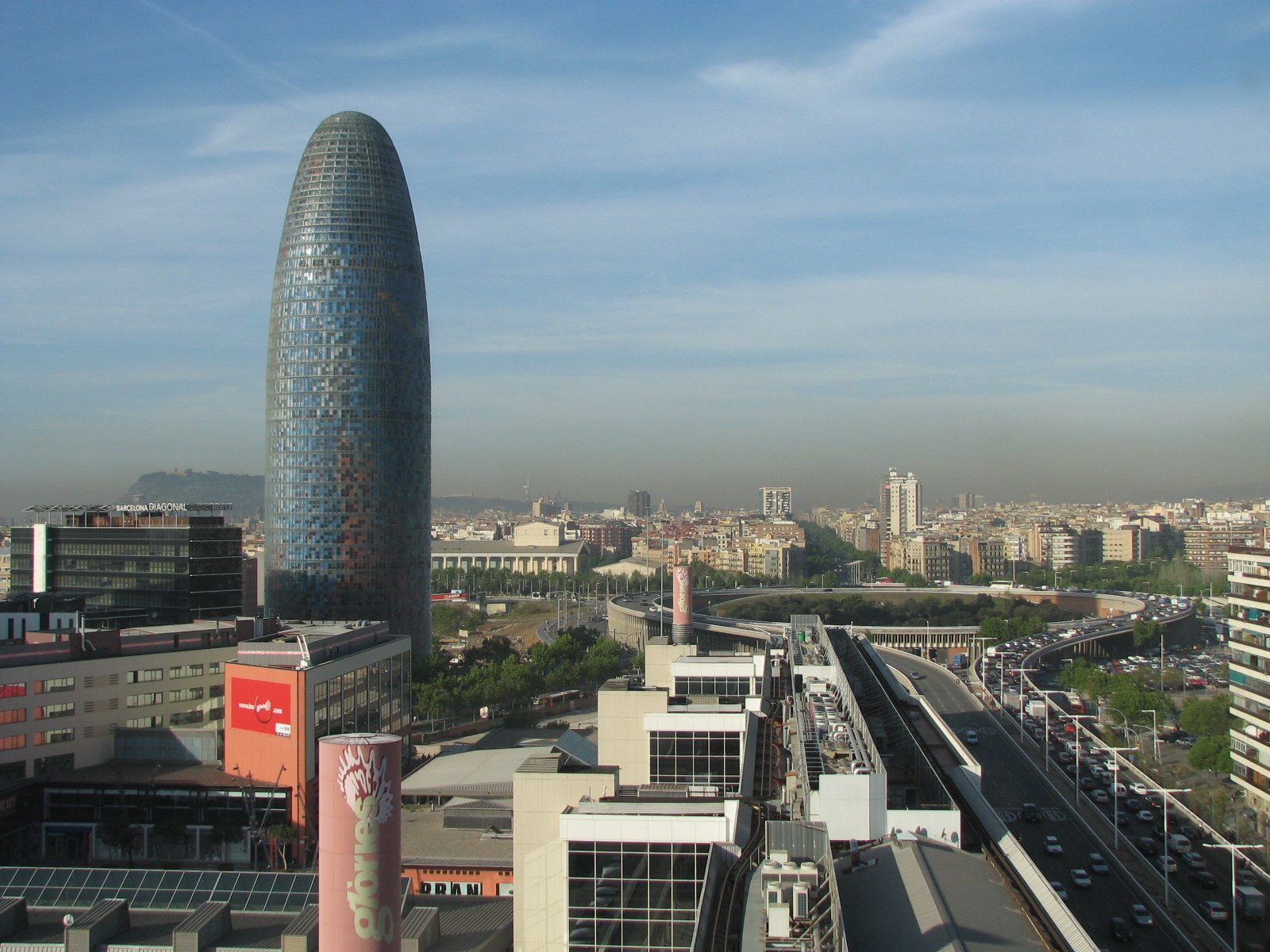
Torre Agbar and Plaça de les Glòries Catalanes, as seen from a nearby office building, 25 April 2008

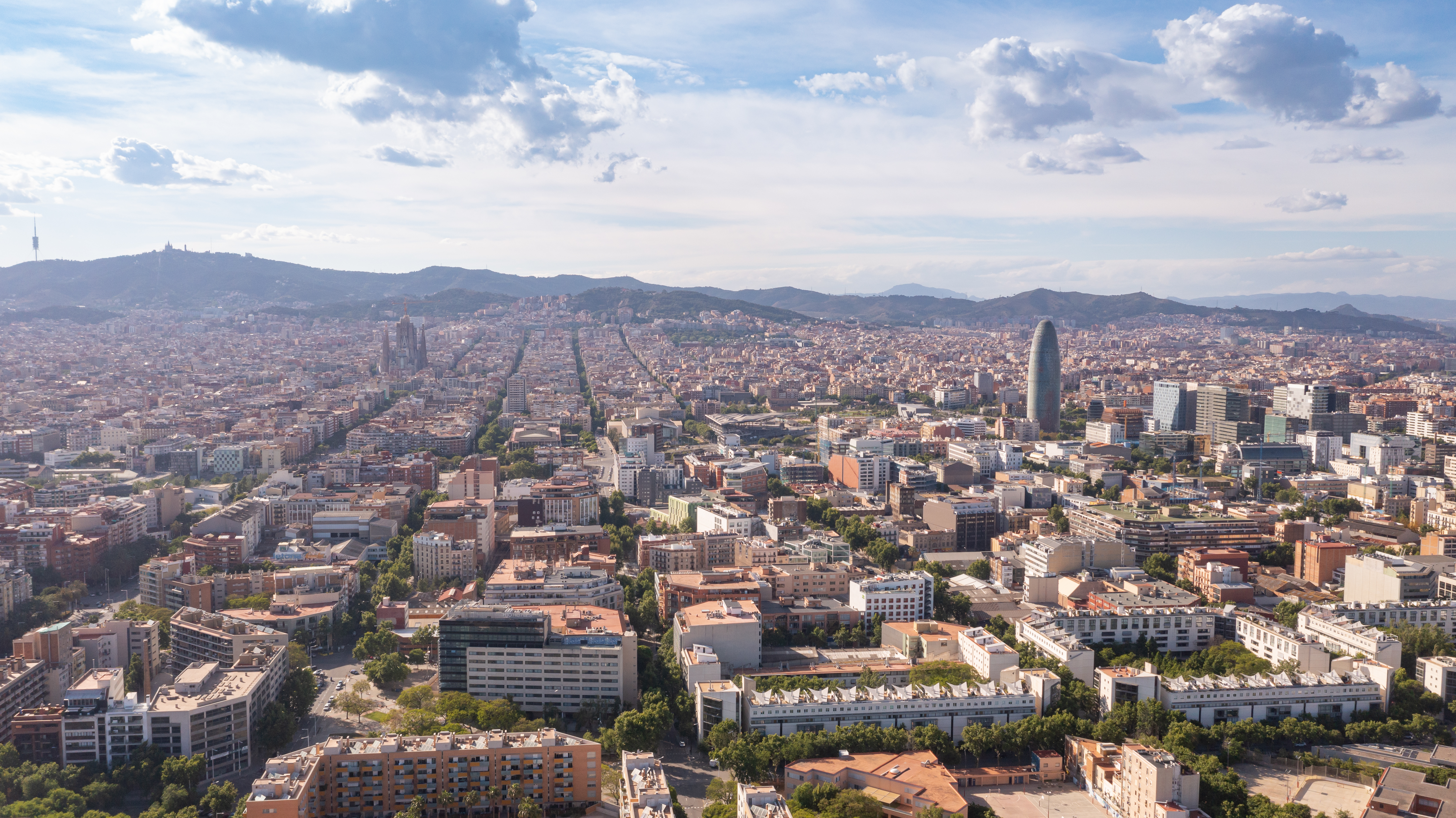
Aerial view of Barcelona and Torre Agbar, Spain

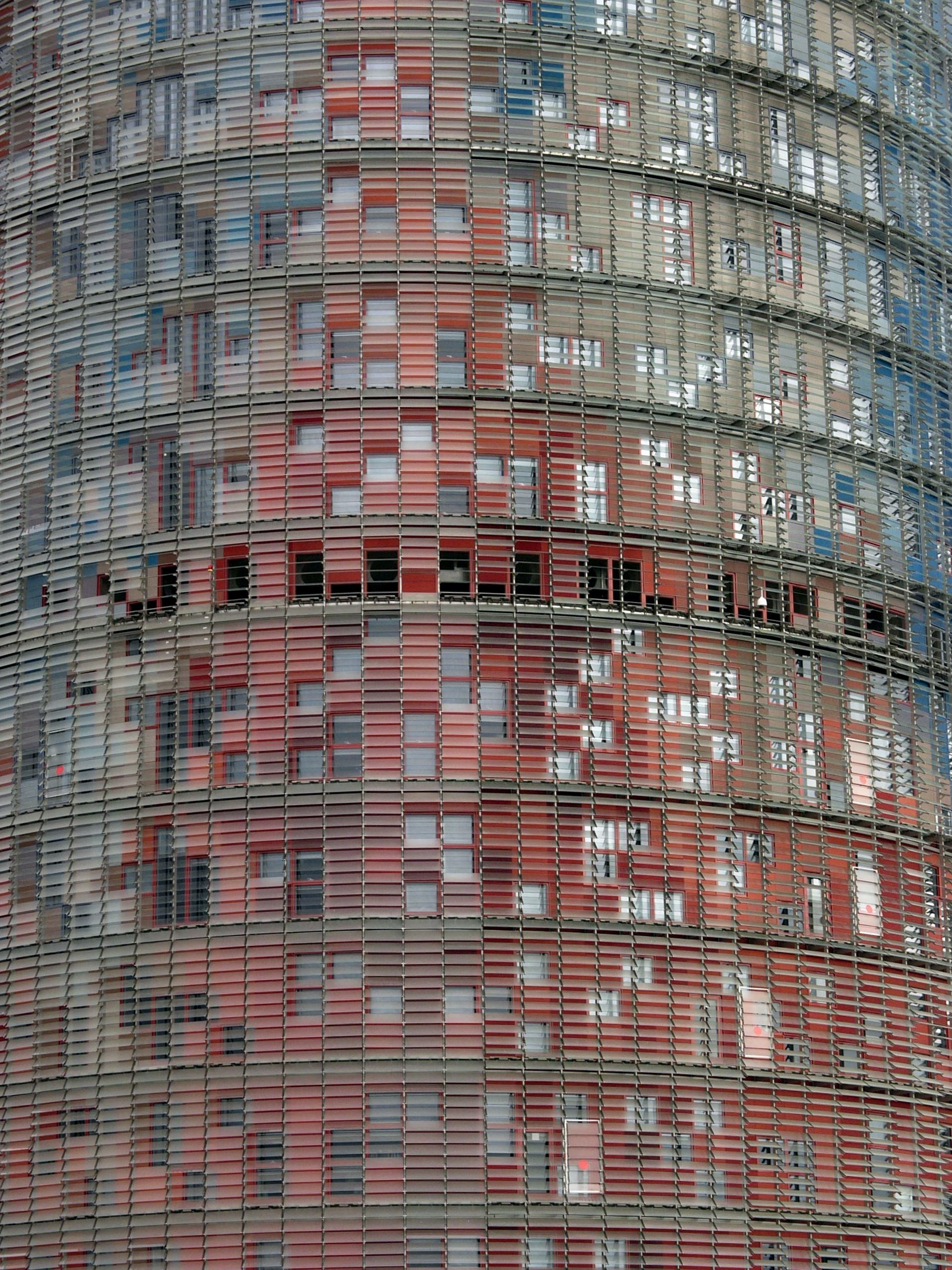
Torre Agbar façade

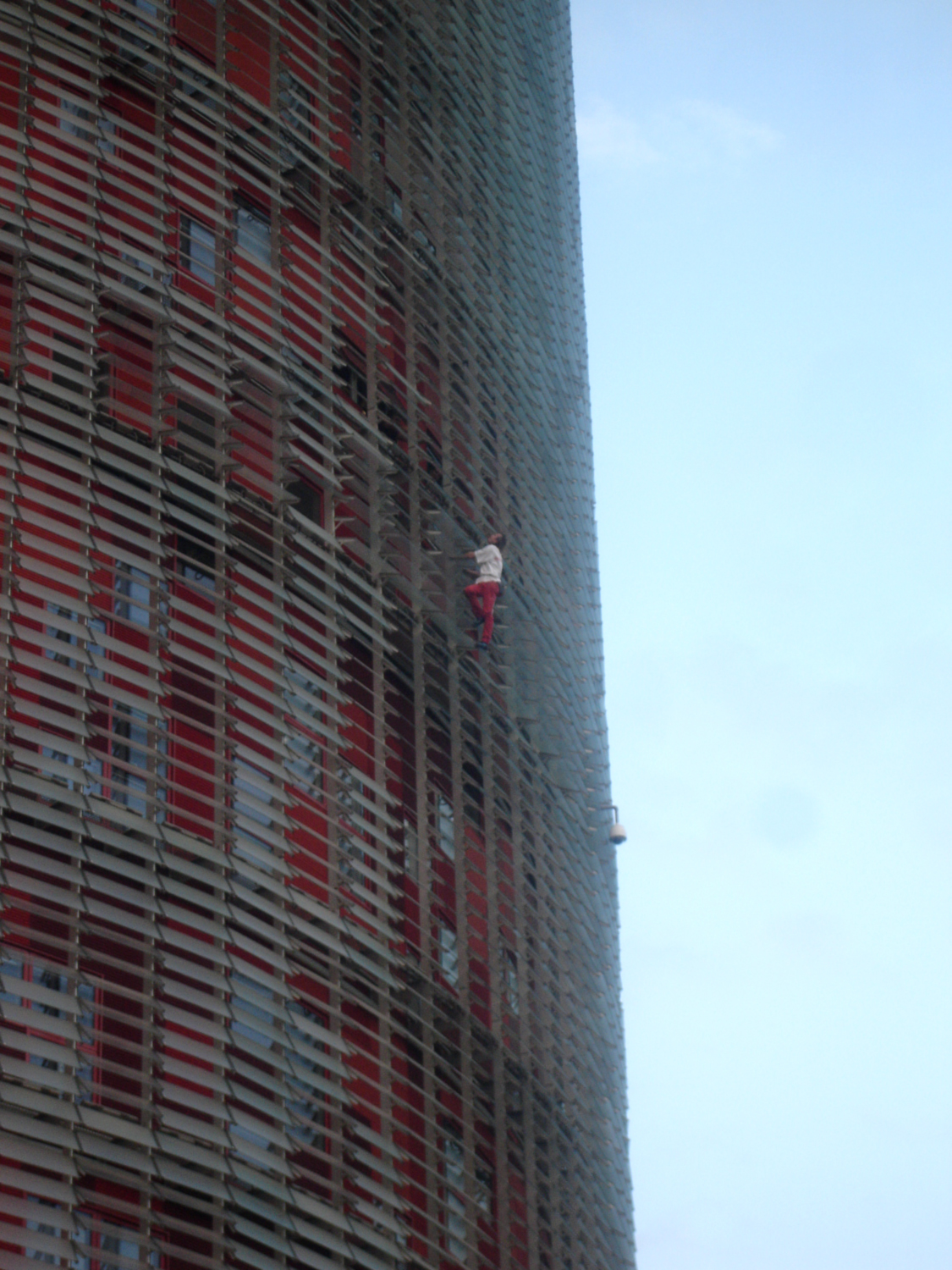
Alain Robert climbing Torre Agbar, 9 October 2007

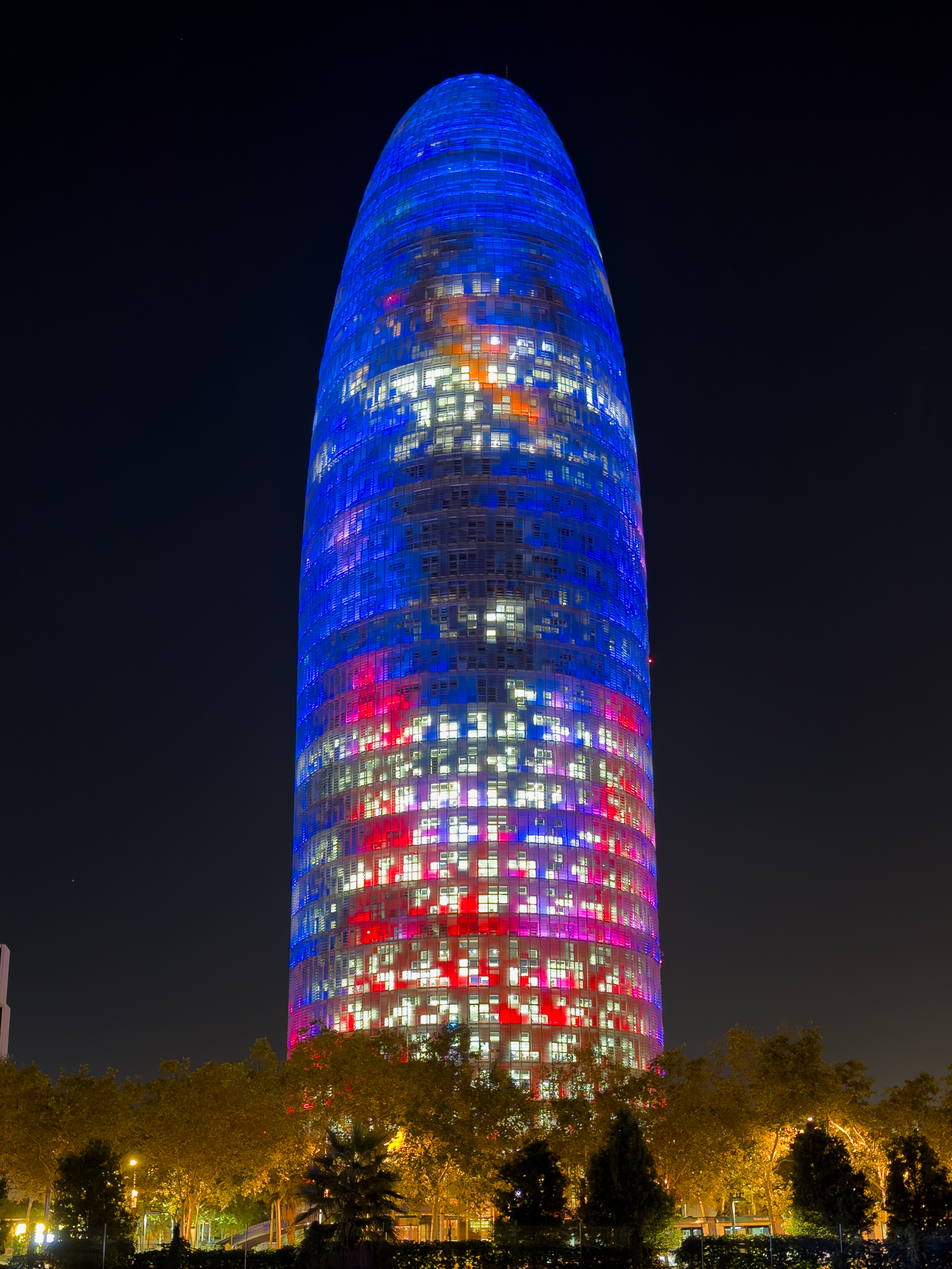
Torre Glòries at night, 2019

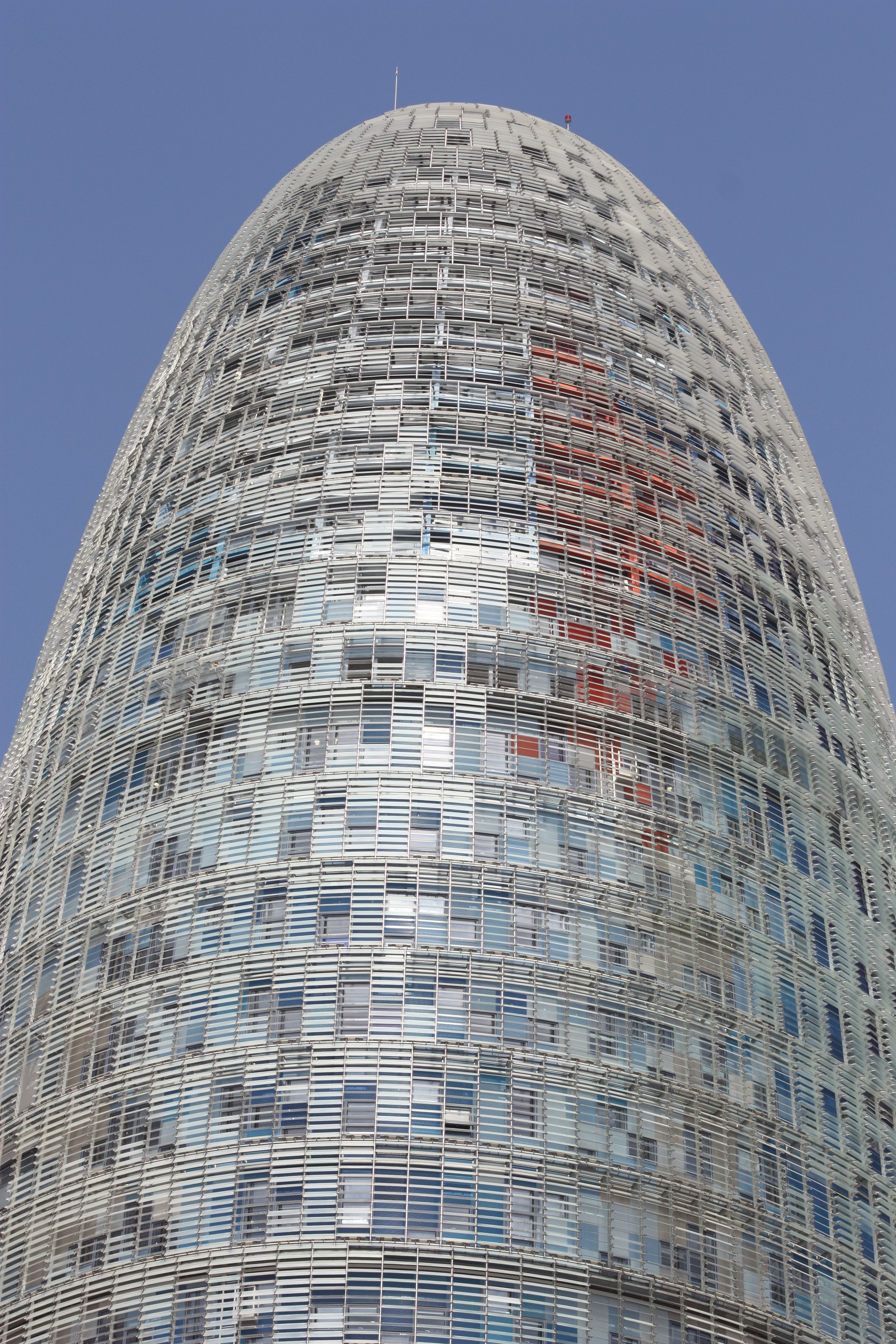
Torre Agbar, July 2009

== See also ==
- 30 St Mary Axe, also known as "The Gherkin", and occasionally as The Swiss Re Tower, is an architecturally similar building in London which opened a year and a half earlier, in April 2004.
- Alain Robert, a famous climber who has scaled the building.

Preceded by Highcliff (Hong Kong, China)	Emporis Skyscraper Award (Silver); 2004	Succeeded by Q1 Tower (Gold Coast, Australia)
