= LNN =

LNN may refer to:

- Late Nite News with Loyiso Gola, a South African television programme
- Lindsay Manufacturing, a manufacturer of irrigation systems
- London News Network, a television news service
- Lorediakarkar language, an Austronesian language of Vanuatu
- Willoughby Lost Nation Municipal Airport, Ohio, United States
