= Dow Jones Sustainability Indices =

Stock market indices

The Dow Jones Sustainability Indices (DJSI) launched in 1999, are a family of indices evaluating the sustainability performance of thousands of companies trading publicly, operated under a strategic partnership between S&P Dow Jones Indices and RobecoSAM (Sustainable Asset Management) of the S&P Dow Jones Indices. They are the longest-running global sustainability benchmarks worldwide and have become the key reference point in sustainability investing for investors and companies alike. In 2012, S&P Dow Jones Indices was formed via the merger of S&P Indices and Dow Jones Indexes.

The DJSI is based on an analysis of corporate economic, environmental and social performance, assessing issues such as corporate governance, risk management, branding, climate change mitigation, supply chain standards and labor practices. The trend is to reject companies that do not operate in a sustainable and ethical manner. It includes general as well as industry-specific sustainability criteria for each of the 60 industries defined according to the Industry Classification Benchmark (ICB).

The DJSI family contains one main global index, the DJSI World, and various indices based on geographic regions such as: Europe, Nordic, North America and Asia Pacific. The DJSI also contains industry-specific indices called "blue chip indices". In addition, the DJSI methodology facilitates the design, development and delivery of customized sustainability indices; e.g., indices covering different regions, indices covering different segments of the leading sustainability companies, indices covering additional exclusion criteria and indices denominated in different currencies.

To be incorporated in the DJSI, companies are assessed and selected based on their long-term economic, social and environmental asset management plans. Selection criteria evolve each year and companies must continue to make improvements to their long-term sustainability plans in order to remain on the Index. Indices are updated yearly and companies are monitored throughout the year.

== History ==
- 1999: The DJSI are launched in September. It is a collaboration with SAM and the Dow Jones Indexes. SAM is a global investment company focused exclusively on sustainability investing. The indices are created to track financial success of leading sustainability companies. The top-ten percent of the best scoring companies of the largest 2,500 companies listed on Dow Jones are included.
- 2001: The DJSI is expanded to include STOXX Ltd., another indexing company. The Dow Jones STOXX Sustainability Index is introduced and marketed towards Europe's sustainability leaders.
- 2005: The Dow Jones Sustainability North America Index is created.
- 2006: Dow Jones Indexes and SAM launch the Dow Jones Islamic Market Sustainability Index that combines Islamic investing principles and sustainability criteria from the DJSI.
- 2009: The Dow Jones Sustainability Asia Pacific Index and Korea Index are launched.
- 2010: SAM and Dow Jones Indexes terminate collaboration with STOXX. "Dow Jones Indexes will be responsible for calculation, marketing and distribution of the indexes including the European Indexes, while SAM [will] remain responsible for the component selections. As a result, SAM's collaboration with STOXX Ltd., which had previously calculated the European STOXX Sustainability Indexes, has been terminated."
- 2010: SAM and Dow Jones Indexes launch the DJSI Nordic Index.
- 2010, on August, the Dow Jones Sustainability Europe Index is launched.
- 2012: The S&P Indices and Dow Jones Indexes are merged to form the S&P Dow Jones Indices.

== Indices ==
Indices are denominated in both US dollars and Euros and are calculated using the Laspeyres formula. All indices that are not subsets include companies that generate revenue from alcohol, tobacco, gambling, armaments and firearms, and adult entertainment. Index components are based on free-float market capitalization and most main indices are reviewed quarterly, excluding the world index. Customized indices are continuously being developed and delivered to encompass different regions or individualized sections of companies to add additional exclusions when needed and to change the currencies they are denoted in.

The DJSI have been divided into various benchmarks including the World, Europe, North America, Asia Pacific, Nordic, and Korean indices.

=== DJSI World Index ===
32 countries are represented in the World Index as of December 2023.

The World Index, or DJSI World, was first published in September 1999. It is based on the largest 2,500 companies in the Dow Jones Global Total Stock Market Index (DJGTSMI). It covers the top-ten percent of these companies in terms of economic, environmental, and social criteria which equals about 300 companies. The DJSI World has two subset indices, which are the Dow Jones Sustainability Index World 80 (DJSI World 80) and the Dow Jones Sustainability Index World ex US 80 (DJSI World ex US 80). Both subsets were initially published in August 2008 and track the performance of the largest 80 companies globally in terms of sustainability, with the DJSI World ex US 80 excluding the US from the top 80. The DJSI World and its subset are all reviewed on an annual basis.

1. Technology (11.0%)
2. Telecommunications (2.00%)
3. Health Care (9.00%)
4. Financials (18.0%)
5. Real Estate (5.00%)
6. Consumer Discretionary (25.0%)
7. Consumer Staples (6.00%)
8. Industrials (7.00%)
9. Basic Materials (8.00%)
10. Energy (4.00%)
11. Utilities (5.00%)

The ICB breakdown is shown here, with consumer discretionary being the most represented sector. Companies in bold represent the top ten holdings by index weight.

Country	Company	Sector
Australia	ANZ Bank	Financials
Australia	Brambles	Industrials
Australia	Dexus	Real estate
Australia	Fortescue	Basic materials
Australia	GPT Group	Real estate
Australia	National Australia Bank	Financials
Australia	Stockland	Real estate
Australia	Transurban	Industrials
Australia	Vicinity	Real estate
Australia	Woodside Energy	Energy
Austria	OMV Aktiengesellschaft	Energy
Belgium	Warehouses De Pauw	Real estate
Brazil	Banco Bradesco	Financials
Brazil	Banco do Brasil	Financials
Brazil	CEMIG	Utilities
Brazil	Itaú Unibanco	Financials
Brazil	Itaúsa	Financials
Brazil	Klabin	Basic materials
Brazil	Lojas Renner	Consumer discretionary
Brazil	Rumo Logística	Industrials
Canada	Canadian National	Industrials
Canada	CPKC	Industrials
Canada	Kinross Gold	Basic materials
Canada	Teck Resources	Basic materials
Chile	Falabella	Consumer discretionary
Chile	Sociedad Química y Minera	Basic materials
China	JD.com	Consumer discretionary
China	Kanzhun	Consumer discretionary
China	**Tencent**	Consumer discretionary
China	WuXi AppTec	Health care
China	WuXi Biologics	Health care
China	Yum China	Consumer discretionary
Colombia	Bancolombia	Financials
Colombia	Grupo Argos	Basic materials
Colombia	Grupo Sura	Financials
Colombia	Grupo Nutresa	Consumer staples
Denmark	Vestas	Consumer discretionary
Finland	Kesko	Consumer staples
Finland	Neste	Energy
Finland	UPM	Basic materials
Finland	Valmet	Consumer discretionary
France	Alstom	Consumer discretionary
France	Arkema	Basic materials
France	Axa	Financials
France	bioMérieux	Health care
France	BNP Paribas	Financials
France	Bureau Veritas	Industrials
France	Carrefour	Consumer staples
France	Covivio	Real estate
France	Dassault Systèmes	Technology
France	Engie	Utilities
France	Kering	Consumer discretionary
France	Publicis	Consumer discretionary
France	Rexel	Consumer discretionary
France	Sanofi	Health care
France	Schneider Electric	Consumer discretionary
France	Sodexo	Consumer discretionary
France	TF1	Consumer discretionary
France	TotalEnergies	Energy
France	Veolia	Utilities
France	Wendel	Financials
France	Worldline	Financials
Germany	Allianz	Financials
Germany	Deutsche Börse	Financials
Germany	Deutsche Post	Industrials
Germany	Deutsche Telekom	Telecommunications
Germany	GEA Group	Consumer discretionary
Germany	Hochtief	Consumer discretionary
Germany	Hugo Boss	Consumer discretionary
Germany	Infineon Technologies	Technology
Germany	Lanxess	Basic materials
Germany	Metro	Consumer staples
Germany	Munich Re	Financials
Germany	SAP	Technology
Germany	Siemens	Consumer discretionary
Hong Kong	Link REIT	Real estate
Hong Kong	Swire Properties	Real estate
India	Dr. Reddy's Laboratories	Health care
India	Hindalco Industries	Basic materials
India	JSW Steel	Basic materials
India	Mahindra & Mahindra	Consumer discretionary
India	Tech Mahindra	Technology
India	UPL	Basic materials
India	Vedanta	Basic materials
Ireland	Trane Technologies	Consumer discretionary
Italy	Assicurazioni Generali	Financials
Italy	Enel	Utilities
Italy	Hera Group	Utilities
Italy	Intesa Sanpaolo	Financials
Italy	Italgas	Utilities
Italy	Iveco Group	Consumer discretionary
Italy	Leonardo	Consumer discretionary
Italy	Moncler	Consumer discretionary
Italy	Nexi	Financials
Italy	Pirelli	Consumer discretionary
Italy	Poste Italiane	Financials
Italy	Prysmian	Consumer discretionary
Italy	Saipem	Energy
Italy	Snam	Utilities
Italy	Terna	Utilities
Japan	Ajinomoto	Consumer staples
Japan	ANA Holdings	Industrials
Japan	Bridgestone	Consumer discretionary
Japan	Chugai Pharmaceutical	Health care
Japan	Dentsu	Consumer discretionary
Japan	Fujitsu	Technology
Japan	Honda	Consumer discretionary
Japan	Itochu	Consumer discretionary
Japan	Komatsu	Consumer discretionary
Japan	Lixil Group	Consumer discretionary
Japan	LY Corporation	Consumer discretionary
Japan	Marui	Financials
Japan	Meiji Holdings	Consumer staples
Japan	Mitsubishi Chemical Group	Basic materials
Japan	Mitsubishi Heavy Industries	Consumer discretionary
Japan	Mitsui & Co	Consumer discretionary
Japan	Nabtesco	Consumer discretionary
Japan	Nikon	Consumer discretionary
Japan	Nippon Prologis REIT	Real estate
Japan	Nissin Foods	Consumer staples
Japan	Nomura Holdings	Financials
Japan	Nomura Research Institute	Technology
Japan	NTT Data	Technology
Japan	Olympus Corporation	Health care
Japan	Omron	Technology
Japan	Ono Pharmaceutical	Health care
Japan	Ricoh	Technology
Japan	Sekisui Chemical	Consumer discretionary
Japan	Sekisui House	Consumer discretionary
Japan	Seven & i Holdings	Consumer staples
Japan	Shiseido	Consumer discretionary
Japan	SoftBank	Telecommunications
Japan	Sojitz	Consumer discretionary
Japan	Sumitomo Forestry	Consumer discretionary
Japan	Sysmex Corporation	Health care
Japan	Toppan	Industrials
Japan	Toto	Consumer discretionary
Japan	Yokogawa Electric	Technology
Macao	Sands China	Consumer discretionary
Malaysia	Petronas	Basic materials
Netherlands	**ASML Holding**	Technology
Netherlands	ASR Nederland	Financials
Netherlands	Ferrovial	Consumer discretionary
Netherlands	Ahold Delhaize	Consumer staples
Netherlands	NN Group	Financials
Netherlands	PostNL	Industrials
Netherlands	Ranstad	Industrials
Netherlands	Signify	Consumer discretionary
Norway	Storebrand	Financials
Portugal	EDP Group	Utilities
Portugal	Galp Energia	Energy
Republic of Korea	Doosan Enerbility	Consumer discretionary
Republic of Korea	Hana Financial Group	Financials
Republic of Korea	Hyundai Engineering & Construction	Consumer discretionary
Republic of Korea	Hyundai Glovis	Industrials
Republic of Korea	Hyundai Mobis	Consumer discretionary
Republic of Korea	Hyundai Motor Company	Consumer discretionary
Republic of Korea	Hyundai Steel	Basic materials
Republic of Korea	Kakao	Consumer discretionary
Republic of Korea	KB Financial Group	Financials
Republic of Korea	Kia	Consumer discretionary
Republic of Korea	LG Electronics	Consumer discretionary
Republic of Korea	LG Household & Health Care	Consumer discretionary
Republic of Korea	Mirae Asset Securities	Financials
Republic of Korea	Samsung Biologics	Health care
Republic of Korea	Samsung C&T Corporation	Consumer discretionary
Republic of Korea	Samsung Electro-Mechanics	Technology
Republic of Korea	Samsung SDI	Technology
Republic of Korea	Samsung Securities	Financials
Republic of Korea	Shinhan Financial Group	Financials
Republic of Korea	SK	Consumer discretionary
Republic of Korea	SK Telecom	Telecommunications
Republic of Korea	S-Oil	Energy
Singapore	CapitaLand	Real estate
Singapore	Keppel Corporation	Consumer discretionary
Singapore	Wilmar International	Consumer staples
South Africa	Exxaro	Energy
South Africa	Gold Fields	Basic materials
Spain	Acciona	Utilities
Spain	AENA	Industrials
Spain	Amadeus IT Group	Consumer discretionary
Spain	Banco Bilbao Vizcaya Argentaria	Financials
Spain	Banco Santander	Financials
Spain	Bankinter	Financials
Spain	CaixaBank	Financials
Spain	Enagás	Utilities
Spain	Endesa	Utilities
Spain	Grifols	Health care
Spain	Iberdrola	Utilities
Spain	Indra Sistemas	Technology
Spain	Inditex	Consumer discretionary
Spain	Merlin Properties	Real estate
Spain	Red Eléctrica de España	Utilities
Sweden	Billerud	Basic materials
Sweden	Castellum	Real estate
Sweden	EQT	Financials
Sweden	H&M	Consumer discretionary
Sweden	Viaplay Group	Consumer discretionary
Switzerland	Coca-Cola Hellenic Bottling Company	Consumer staples
Switzerland	Partners Group	Financials
Switzerland	Roche	Health care
Switzerland	SGS	Industrials
Switzerland	Sonova	Health care
Switzerland	STMicroelectronics	Technology
Switzerland	Temenos	Technology
Switzerland	UBS	Financials
Taiwan	Advantech Co	Technology
Taiwan	ASE Group	Technology
Taiwan	Cathay Financial Holding Co	Financials
Taiwan	Chailease Holding Company	Financials
Taiwan	Chang Hwa Bank	Financials
Taiwan	KGI Financial Holding	Financials
Taiwan	Chunghwa Telecom	Telecommunications
Taiwan	CTBC Financial Holding	Financials
Taiwan	Delta Electronics	Technology
Taiwan	E Ink	Technology
Taiwan	E.SUN Commercial Bank	Financials
Taiwan	Far EasTone	Telecommunications
Taiwan	First Financial Holding Co	Financials
Taiwan	Fubon Financial Holding Co.	Financials
Taiwan	InnoLux	Technology
Taiwan	Lite-On	Technology
Taiwan	Mega International Commercial Bank	Financials
Taiwan	Nanya Technology Corporation	Technology
Taiwan	President Chain Store Corporation	Consumer staples
Taiwan	Shin Kong Group	Financials
Taiwan	SinoPac Financial Holdings Company	Financials
Taiwan	Taishin Financial Holdings	Financials
Taiwan	Taiwan Cooperative Bank	Financials
Taiwan	Taiwan Mobile	Telecommunications
Taiwan	**TSMC**	Technology
Taiwan	Shanghai Commercial and Savings Bank	Financials
Taiwan	United Microelectronics Corporation	Technology
Taiwan	Vanguard International Semiconductor Corporation	Technology
Taiwan	WIN Semiconductors	Technology
Taiwan	Yuanta Securities	Financials
Thailand	Advanced Info Service	Telecommunications
Thailand	Airports of Thailand	Industrials
Thailand	Bangkok Dusit Medical Services	Health care
Thailand	Central Pattana	Real estate
Thailand	Central Retail Corporation	Consumer discretionary
Thailand	CP All	Consumer staples
Thailand	Delta Electronics	Technology
Thailand	Indorama Ventures	Basic materials
Thailand	Kasikornbank	Financials
Thailand	PTT Exploration & Production	Energy
Thailand	PTT Global Chemical	Basic materials
Thailand	PTT Public Company	Energy
Thailand	Siam Commercial Bank	Financials
Thailand	Siam Cement Group	Basic materials
Thailand	ThaiBev	Consumer staples
United Kingdom	Abrdn	Financials
United Kingdom	Anglo American	Basic materials
United Kingdom	Aviva	Financials
United Kingdom	CNH Industrial	Consumer discretionary
United Kingdom	Diageo	Consumer staples
United Kingdom	GSK	Health care
United Kingdom	Informa	Consumer discretionary
United Kingdom	International Distributions Services	Industrials
United Kingdom	Landsec	Real estate
United Kingdom	**Linde**	Basic materials
United Kingdom	Pearson	Consumer discretionary
United Kingdom	Reckitt	Consumer discretionary
United Kingdom	RELX	Industrials
United Kingdom	Rolls-Royce Holdings	Consumer discretionary
United Kingdom	United Utilities	Utilities
United Kingdom	WHSmith	Consumer discretionary
United States	Abbott Laboratories	Health care
United States	**AbbVie**	Health care
United States	**Adobe**	Technology
United States	Agilent Technologies	Health care
United States	**Alphabet**	Consumer discretionary
United States	American Airlines Group	Industrials
United States	Autodesk	Technology
United States	Biogen	Health care
United States	Cigna	Health care
United States	Cisco	Technology
United States	Cummins	Consumer discretionary
United States	CVS Health	Health care
United States	DaVita	Health care
United States	Dow Chemical Company	Basic materials
United States	eBay	Consumer discretionary
United States	Ecolab	Basic materials
United States	Edwards Lifesciences	Health care
United States	Elevance Health	Health care
United States	Fortinet	Technology
United States	Gap	Consumer discretionary
United States	General Mills	Consumer staples
United States	Gilead Sciences	Health care
United States	Healthpeak Properties	Real estate
United States	Hess Corporation	Energy
United States	Hilton Worldwide	Consumer discretionary
United States	Host Hotels & Resorts	Real estate
United States	HP	Technology
United States	Illumina	Health care
United States	Ingersoll Rand	Consumer discretionary
United States	Jacobs Solutions	Industrials
United States	Las Vegas Sands	Consumer discretionary
United States	Lockheed Martin	Consumer discretionary
United States	Medtronic	Health care
United States	**Microsoft**	Technology
United States	Mondelez International	Consumer staples
United States	Moody's Corporation	Financials
United States	Newmont	Basic materials
United States	Northrop Grumman	Consumer discretionary
United States	Oshkosh Corporation	Consumer discretionary
United States	Owens Corning	Consumer discretionary
United States	Philip Morris International	Consumer staples
United States	Prologis	Real estate
United States	Regeneron Pharmaceuticals	Health care
United States	Republic Services	Industrials
United States	S&P Global	Financials
United States	**Salesforce**	Technology
United States	ServiceNow	Technology
United States	Snap	Consumer discretionary
United States	Spirit AeroSystems	Consumer discretionary
United States	Williams Companies	Energy
United States	Union Pacific Corporation	Industrials
United States	**UnitedHealth Group**	Health care
United States	WM	Industrials
United States	Whirlpool Corporation	Consumer discretionary

=== DJSI Europe and Eurozone Index ===
The Dow Jones Sustainability Europe Index covers the leading 20 percent of the largest 600 European companies in terms of sustainability from the DJGTSMI. It is subset by three different more specific indices for the region, the main subset being the Dow Jones Sustainability Eurozone Index (DJSI Eurozone). This index tracks the financial performance of sustainability leaders in the smaller eurozone region. Both indices were launched in August 2010 and have their own further subset. The two subsets are the Dow Jones Sustainability Europe 40 Index (DJSI Europe 40) and the Dow Jones Sustainability Eurozone 40 Index (DJSI Eurozone 40), both of which were also launched in August 2010. These track the top-40 sustainability leaders in Europe and the smaller Eurozone region. DJSI Europe and eurozone are reviewed annually as well as quarterly to maintain accuracy of the index composition while the DJSI Europe 40 and DJSI Eurozone 40 are reviewed only annually.

=== DJSI North America and United States Index ===
The Dow Jones Sustainability North American Index has a similar design as the DJSI Europe and also reviews the top-20 percent of the 600 largest companies, but in this case in North America. It was originally launched, along with its subset Dow Jones Sustainability United States Index (DJSI United States), in September 2005. Both indices are further broken down by the Dow Jones Sustainability North America 40 Index (DJSI North America 40) and the Dow Jones Sustainability United States 40 Index (DJSI United States 40), which cover the leading 40 sustainability driven companies in North America and the United States, respectively. Both subsets, however, were not launched until August 2008, three years after the DJSI North America.

=== DJSI Asia Pacific Index ===
The Dow Jones Sustainability Asian Pacific Index (DJSI Asia Pacific) was launched at the same time as its single subset, the Dow Jones Sustainability Asia Pacific 40 Index (DJSI Asia Pacific 40), in January 2009. As of 2009, the DJSI Asia Pacific included 122 companies and captures the leading 20 percent of the top-600 companies in developed Asia Pacific Markets in terms of sustainability as derived from the DJGTSMI. DJSI Asia Pacific 40, the subset, tracks the largest 40 companies who are sustainability leaders in the Asia Pacific region.

=== DJSI Korea Index ===
The Dow Jones Sustainability Korea Index (DJSI Korea) is derived from the smallest pool of companies, tracking the most sustainable 30 percent of the largest 200 Korean companies. The DJSI Korea was launched in October 2009, along with its subset the Dow Jones Sustainability Korea 20 Index (DJSI Korea 20). As of that date, 41 companies were included in the DJSI Korea. DJSI Korea 20 encompasses the largest 20 sustainable leading companies in the region. The index encompasses a smaller region than the other indices resulting in a higher percentage of companies analyzed and a lower number of companies that are reviewed in the subset. The DJSI Korea is also reviewed on an annual and quarterly basis, whereas the DJSI Korea 20 is reviewed annually.

== Assessment ==
A defined set of criteria is used to assess the economic, social, and environmental opportunities of the companies that the DJSI has listed, which are chosen based on the Corporate Sustainability Assessment by RobecoSAM. Information comes from the annual RobecoSAM questionnaire (the Corporate Sustainability Assessment), company documentation, the Media and Stakeholder Analysis (an examination of media coverage, stakeholder commentaries and other publicly available sources provided by RepRisk ESG Business Intelligence), and personal contact with the companies. Industry leaders from RobecoSAM Research's Corporate Sustainability Assessment are chosen to be listed on the DJSI.

Once a company is listed on the DJSI, it is monitored daily for any critical arising issues, which can lead to the exclusion of the company if deemed critical enough. Examples of events that would lead to exclusion include: commercial practices, human rights abuses, layoffs or worker disputes, or catastrophic disasters. This monitoring is supported by RepRisk, a global research firm and provider of environmental, social and governance (ESG) risk data. RepRisk screens media outlets, stakeholder groups and other publicly available sources to identify risks related to these issues. The information gathered is then systematically analyzed and quantified. If a critical event happens, the situation is analyzed by RobecoSAM for the scope in which it reaches. If large enough, the event will be analyzed further based on severity, media coverage, and crisis management. RobecoSAM analysts decide from here whether the company will be excluded from the DJSI. An assurance report is completed by Deloitte to ensure the validity of the company's information.

In early 2009, an independent expert study commissioned by the United Nations Environment Programme Finance Initiative (UNEP FI) and presented at the World Economic Forum in Davos, highlighted the SAM assessment as "the most rigorous in terms of the number of questions and depth of information requested".

In 2009, SAM carried out its 11th-consecutive Corporate Sustainability Assessment, assessing more than 1,200 companies, an increase of eight percent from 2008. At the onset of DJSI's assessment criteria, SAM mainly focused on government compliance and regulations. It has evolved to embrace corporate sustainability as a key competitive advantage, taking into account nine specific criteria in addition to industry-specific criteria. Below are the criteria and weightings SAM uses to assess a company's overall score.

Criteria	Weightings
Economic dimension: 33%; Environmental dimension: 33%; Social dimension: 33%	Industry criteria: 57%; General criteria: 43%

These weightings are approximations, and actual weightings may differ between industries. A breakdown of these dimensions is seen below.

Economic dimension	Weightings in percentage
Corporate governance	6.0
Risk and crisis management	6.0
Codes of conduct/compliance/anti-corruption and bribery	6.0
Industry-specific criteria	Depends on industry

Environmental dimension	Weightings in percentages
Environmental reporting	3.0
Industry-specific criteria	Depends on industry

Social dimension	Weightings in percentages
Human-capital development	5.5
Talent attraction and retention	5.5
Labor practice indicators	5.0
Corporate citizenship / philanthropy	3.0
Social reporting	3.0
Industry-specific criteria	Depends on industry

Number of invited companies in 2010:

- Total Number Invited Companies = 2,617
- DJSI World Universe = 2,500
- DJSI Europe Universe = 600
- DJSI North America Universe = 600
- DJSI Asia Pacific = 600
- DJSI Korea = 200
- Companies analyzed globally = 1,393
- Companies completing questionnaire = 698
- Companies analyzed based exclusively on public information = 695

Some of the assessment criteria have varied slightly from year to year to reflect growing information about particular issues such as water related risks, brand management, corporate citizenship, risk and crisis management. Continuous improvement allows for SAM to provide both relevant and current information.

Since 1999, SAM's Corporate Sustainability Assessment has increased in number of assessed companies, number of sectors, number of questions to companies, average totally sustainability score, and weight of sector-specific criteria in percentage total weight.

	1999	2009
Number of assessed companies	468	1,237
Number of sectors	68	58
Number of questions to companies	50	100
Average total sustainability score (out of 100)	27	48
Weight of sector-specific criteria (in % of total weight)	30	57

Included in the most recent SAM questionnaire are more difficult to measure intangible business attributes such as innovation and customer relationship management. Questions are both directed at short-term risks and opportunities and sustainable long-term value creation. The intensity of the industry-specific criteria has continuously increased. In 1999, industry-specific information accounted for only 30 percent of the overall score, while now it accounts for nearly 60 percent.

From these questionnaires, each company can be awarded one or a combination of the following status:

- Sector Leader: In each sector, the SAM Sector Leader is identified as the company best prepared to seize the opportunities and manage the risks deriving from economic, environmental and social developments. The SAM Sector Leader is the company with the best score of all companies assessed in this sector.
- Sector Mover: Sector Mover is awarded to the company that achieved the biggest proportional improvement in its sustainability performance compared with last year.
- SAM Gold Class: To qualify for the SAM Gold Class, the SAM Sector Leader must achieve a minimum total score of 75 percent. Peer-group companies whose total score is within five percent of the SAM Sector Leader are also awarded. SAM Gold Class. A score up to ten percent lower than the leader results in SAM Silver Class, a score up to 15 percent lower than the leader results in SAM Bronze Class.
- SAM Silver Class: To qualify for the SAM Silver Class, the SAM Sector Leader must achieve a total score in the range of 70 to 75 percent. Peer-group companies whose total score is within five to 10 percent of the SAM Sector Leader are also awarded SAM Silver Class, while a score of ten percent lower than the leader results in SAM Bronze Class.
- Sam Bronze Class: To qualify for the SAM Bronze Class, the SAM Sector Leader must achieve a total score in the range of 65 to 70 percent. Peer-group companies whose total score is within 10 to 15 percent of the SAM Sector Leader are also awarded SAM Bronze Class.

== Criticism ==
SAM uses four sources of information to assess corporate sustainability: company questionnaire (the Corporate Sustainability Assessment), company documentation, Media and Stakeholder Analysis, and contact with companies.

Information source	Who provides them	What type of documents
Company questionnaire	companies	SAM distributes sector-specific questionnaires to each company. Companies complete and sign the questionnaire. SAM analysts validate responses. The responses are further verified by PricewaterhouseCoopers, an external resource.
Company documentation	companies	Documents requested from companies include sustainability reports, environmental reports, health and safety reports, social reports, annual financial reports, special reports (e.g., on intellectual capital management, corporate governance), and all other sources of company information.
Media and stakeholder analysis	RepRisk ESG Business Intelligence	A variety of third-party sources and external stakeholders, including print and online news articles, stakeholder commentaries from NGOs, governmental agencies, think tanks, social media and others, as well as other publicly assessable sources.
Company contact	company and SAM	Discussions and phone conversations with company representatives.

Using self-reported data as proxies for the social or environmental effects the DJSI intends to reflect leaves the index exposed to corporate biases and additional credibility risks. It rewards companies with greatest capacity to respond to SAM's questionnaires and information requests rather than those with the best socially responsible practices. Secondly, relying on self-reported data carries substantial risks since information from companies may not be completely credible. An index based on biased information often underestimates real risk factors in the listed companies' operation, even in those instances when submitted information if verified by an auditing firm such as PricewaterhouseCoopers, KPMG, etc. Ultimately, companies with challenging corporate environmental and social issues are more likely to devote public relations resources to minimize the perception of risk within their operations. In order to address some of this feedback, RobecoSAM added a Media and Stakeholder Analysis component to the annual Corporate Sustainability Assessment, in order to complement and help corroborate the questionnaire and documentation provided by the participating companies. For the MSA, RobecoSAM works with RepRisk, a global research firm specialized in risk analytics and metrics related to environmental, social and governance (ESG) issues. RepRisk screens media outlets, stakeholder groups and other publicly available sources to identify risks, which are then systematically analyzed and quantified.

It has been also found that in the DJSI the three dimensions of sustainability are not considered in a balanced way, being biased towards economic criteria to the disadvantage of social and environmental ones. A further bias of the DJSI is that it only includes large companies, whereas other indices include smaller companies as well. As a consequence of these limitations, a survey conducted among sustainability experts found that only 48 percent considered the DJSI as "highly trusted".

== Relevance of the DJSI ==
=== Studies on the DJSI ===
- Hope, Chris; Fowler, Stephen J. (2007). "A Critical Review of Sustainable Business Indices and Their Impact". Journal of Business Ethics. Vol. 76. S. 243–252.
- Lee, Darren D.; Faff, Robert W. (2009). "Corporate Sustainability Performance and Idiosyncratic Risk: A Global Perspective". Financial Review. 44 (2): 213–237. doi:10.1111/j.1540-6288.2009.00216.x. S2CID 153497860.
- Chatterji, Aaron K.; Durand, Rodolphe; Levine, David I.; Touboul, Samuel (2016). "Do ratings of firms converge? Implications for managers, investors and strategy researchers". Strategic Management Journal. 37 (8): 1597–1614. doi:10.1002/smj.2407. S2CID 53389508.
- Carlos, W. Chad; Lewis, Ben W. (2018). "Strategic Silence: Withholding Certification Status as a Hypocrisy Avoidance Tactic". Administrative Science Quarterly. 63 (1): 130–169. doi:10.1177/0001839217695089. S2CID 151315245.

== See also ==
- Sustainability measurement
- Socially responsible investing
- FTSE4Good Index
