= World Water Index =

Stock market index

The World Water Index (WOWAX) is a global stock market index established in February 2002 by Société Générale in cooperation with SAM Group and Dow Jones Index/STOXX.

It contains the globally largest 20 corporations of the water supply, water infrastructure and water utilities/treatment sector.

The index' assortment of shares is rebalanced every quarter of a year, and revised every six months.

The ISIN of the WOWAX is XY0100291446 and US98151V3006, respectively.

== Companies ==
Index details, full composition May 2017
country	company
Britain	Spirax-Sarco Engineering PLC
South Korea	Coway Co., Ltd.
France	Veolia Environnement
Hong Kong	Guangdong Investment LTD
United States	Flowserve Corp
Japan	Miura Co LTD
Britain	Pentair PLC
United States	A. O. Smith Corp
United States	Xylem Inc
United States	Aqua America Inc
United States	Calgon Carbon Corp
United States	Masco Corp
Chile	Inversiones Aguas Metropolitanas
Japan	Kurita Water Industries LTD
United States	American Water Works Co Inc
Britain	United Utilities Group PLC
Switzerland	Geberit AG-REG
Britain	Severn Trent PLC
Japan	Toto Ltd.
Japan	Lixil Group Corp

== See also ==
- Palisades Water Index
