= Palisades Water Index =

The Palisades Water Index (ZWI) is a modified equal-dollar weighted stock market index. It is designed to track the performance of companies engaged in the global water industry such as pump and filter manufacturers, water utilities, and irrigation equipment manufacturers. The index was set at 1000 as of December 31, 2003.

== History ==
The index was developed in 2003 by Steve Hoffmann. He established the Palisades Water Index Associates to manage and license the index. A number of exchange traded funds (ETFs) were established that track the index.

== Components ==
As of August 2008, the components of the index included the following companies:

- Tetra Tech 4.58%
- Itron Inc 4.12%
- URS Corporation 4.07%
- AECOM 4.00%
- Danaher Corp 3.98%
- Badger Meter 3.95% (flowmeters)
- Veolia Environnement 3.92%
- Valmont Industries Inc. 3.86% (center pivot irrigation systems)
- Calgon Carbon Corporation 3.79% (filtration)
- Agilent Technologies 3.69%
- Lindsay Manufacturing Co. 3.65% (center pivot irrigation systems)
- Mueller Water Products Inc. 3.56%
- Pentair, Inc 3.50% (pumps, motors, filtration, water tanks)
- ITT Industries 3.38% (pumps)
- Watts Water Technologies 'a' 3.37% (valves)
- Pall Corporation 3.25% (filtration)
- Nalco Holding Co. 3.20%
- Insituform Technologies Inc. 3.15% (pipeline installation and repair)
- Ameron International 3.10%
- General Electric 3.01% (appliances, motors)
- Flowserve Corp 2.95% (pumps)
- Franklin Electric 2.85% (pumps and motors)
- Siemens AG Ads 2.82%
- IDEX Corporation 2.79%
- Layne Christensen Co. 2.79%
- Gorman-Rupp 2.65%
- Roper Industries 2.51% (appliances, pumps, industrial controls)
- Consolidated Water Co. Ltd. 1.56% (water utility)
- Southwest Water Co. 1.33%
- American States Water 1.29%
- Aqua America 1.24%
- Companhia de Saneamento Basico do Estado de Sao Paulo 1.03% (water and wastewater utility)

The PowerShares Water Resources Fund is based on this index.

== See also ==
- World Water Index
