= Boston Partners =

Asset management firm based in Boston

Boston Partners Global Investors, Inc.
- Company type: Subsidiary
- Industry: Investment Management
- Founded: April 1995; 31 years ago
- Founder: Desmond Heathwood
- Headquarters: One Beacon Street, Boston, Massachusetts, U.S.
- Key people: Joseph Feeney (CEO & CIO)
- AUM: US$116.5 billion (June 2025)
- Number of employees: 187 (June 2025)
- Parent: Orix
- Website: www.bostonpartners.com

Boston Partners Global Investors, Inc. (Boston Partners) is an American investment management firm headquartered in Boston. The firm focuses on value investing in equities and is composed of three divisions: Boston Partners, Boston Partners Private Wealth, and Weiss, Peck & Greer (WPG) Partners. It is an indirect, wholly owned subsidiary of ORIX Corporation of Japan (ORIX).

== Background ==
Boston Partners traces its origins to The Boston Company, a firm founded in 1865 that provided custodial and trust services to mutual funds, pension funds and charity organizations. In 1981, it was acquired by Shearson under American Express for $50 million. In 1993, Shearson sold The Boston Company to Mellon Bank (Mellon) for $1.5 billion which was considered a hefty price and was not well received by Mellon shareholders.

Boston Company Asset Management (BCAM), the asset management unit of The Boston Company was stated to have friction with Mellon for years. BCAM managers complained that Mellon was reducing their autonomy. At one point, Mellon had tried to dismiss two BCAM managers for securities lending losses. Desmond Heathwood, the chairman and CEO of BCAM attempted to lead a management buyout from Mellon for $150 million but was unsuccessful.

In April 1995, Heathwood and several other BCAM executives left BCAM to form their own firm, Boston Partners. At the time, Boston Partners had 33 employees who were almost all previously part of BCAM's equity team. On April 25, Boston Partners moved into its office at One Financial Center and on May 8, started managing assets for clients. 90% of its clients were former BCAM clients. A legal battle between BCAM and Boston Partners ensued with BCAM suing five of Boston Partners' founders claiming a breach of fiduciary duty and misappropriation of trade secrets. In December that year, both parties settled with Boston Partners making an undisclosed payment to BCAM. In addition Boston Partners was preventing from touting the performance of its managers back when they were at BCAM. Both parties were barred from talking about the details of the case.

In September 2002, Robeco acquired 60% of shares in Boston Partners. In 2003, Robeco acquired the remaining 40% of shares making Boston Partners wholly owned.

In February 2013, Orix acquired Robeco making it the ultimate parent company of Boston Partners.

Boston Partners' main strategy is value investing in equities. It relies on metrics such as P/E ratio and P/B ratio.

== Alleged disability discrimination ==
In April 2022, Martin MacDonnell sued the firm claiming it had engaged in disability discrimination since late 2018. MacDonnell claimed that after the 2013 Boston Marathon bombing, he was diagnosed with PTSD by the Massachusetts General Hospital. In his lawsuit, MacDonnell claims that between late 2018 and 2020, the firm did not inform him of potential promotions or job openings and that on January 4, 2021, MacDonnell had an anxiety attack and had to go to the emergency room. MacDonnell claims that a few weeks later, he was informed he was demoted while on a personal day. MacDonnell alleges that he took a leave for his health beginning February 16, 2021. MacDonnell alleges that he tried to return to work with medical accommodations in July 2021 when his paid leave ended. He asserts that the Company did not meaningfully engage in the interactive process or provide him with reasonable accommodations and his employment terminated January 31, 2023. He responded that the position he was returning to was Quantitative Analyst. In addition, the lawsuit alleged that Joseph Feeny, the firm's CEO, wrote an offensive email over its short position on GameStop, which used the term "retard".

According to a court filing in MacDonnell v. Boston Partners Global Investors, Inc., Boston Partners stated that it had made extensive efforts to accommodate MacDonnell’s medical needs and maintain his employment. The filing noted that MacDonnell had served as a portfolio manager on Boston Partners’ 130/30 Large Cap Value product, which was discontinued in 2020 following the withdrawal of the product’s final client. Boston Partners said that, after the product’s discontinuance, MacDonnell was reassigned to the firm’s Quantitative Research Team without a reduction in salary, that MacDonnell was provided paid and extended unpaid medical leave and offered accommodations including flexible scheduling, remote-work options, and workspace adjustments. Boston Partners asserted that MacDonnell declined to return to work unless reinstated as a portfolio manager, a position the firm stated no longer existed.
