= Ismael Clemente =

Spanish businessman

Ismael Clemente Orrego
- Born: Ismael Clemente Orrego; 1970 (age 55–56); Valencia del Mombuey, Badajoz, Spain
- Education: Law and Business Administration and Management (specialising in Finance)
- Alma mater: Comillas Pontifical University (ICADE)
- Occupations: Entrepreneur and executive
- Organization: MERLIN Properties SOCIMI, S.A. (IBEX 35, since 2014)

Ismael Clemente Orrego (born 1970) is a Spanish entrepreneur and financial executive. He is the co-founder, executive vice-chairman, and chief executive officer (CEO) of Merlin Properties, the largest listed real estate investment trust (REIT) in the Iberian Peninsula and a member of the IBEX 35 index since December 2015.

Under his leadership, the company grew from €1.25 billion raised in its 2014 initial public offering (IPO) to a gross asset value (GAV) of €12.63 billion, reporting a net profit of €786 million at the close of the 2025 financial year.

== Early life and education ==
Clemente was born in Valencia del Mombuey, in the province of Badajoz, Spain, to primary school teachers. He completed his secondary education at the Jesuit-run Colegio San José (Villafranca de los Barros), where he first met Miguel Ollero, who later became his business partner.

He graduated with a double degree in Law and Business Administration and Management (specializing in Finance) from the Pontifical University of Comillas-ICADE in Madrid, where he studied on a scholarship.

== Career ==
=== Investment banking (1994–2012) ===
Clemente began his professional career as a lawyer at Arthur Andersen and subsequently at Garrigues. In 1998, he joined Bankers Trust – REIB in Madrid as Managing Director. Following the acquisition of Bankers Trust by Deutsche Bank, he continued his career at Deutsche Bank Real Estate, where he managed the real estate platform for Iberia and North Africa through the subsidiary RREEF, overseeing a portfolio exceeding €3 billion.

In 2009, he structured the sale and subsequent leaseback of BBVA's "Tree" portfolio—comprising more than 1,000 bank branches—for €1.154 billion, which was noted as the largest real estate transaction in Europe that year. Clemente resigned from Deutsche Bank in 2012 after refusing to implement a requested downsizing of his team in Spain.

=== Magic Real Estate (2012–2014) ===
Following his departure from Deutsche Bank, he co-founded Magic Real Estate SLU, an independent property management firm. In July 2013, the firm advised Blackstone on the acquisition of 1,860 social housing units from the Community of Madrid. Magic Real Estate served as the foundational structure for the creation of Merlin Properties.

=== MERLIN Properties (2014–present) ===
MERLIN Properties SOCIMI, S.A. was incorporated on 25 March 2014 in Madrid, co-founded by Clemente (CEO), Miguel Ollero (CFO/COO), and David Brush (CIO). The company launched its initial public offering (IPO) on 30 June 2014, raising €1.25 billion at €10 per share, making it the largest REIT public offering in Europe at the time. Shortly after its stock market debut, Merlin acquired BBVA’s Tree branch portfolio, which Clemente had originally structured in 2009, for €739.5 million.

In 2015, Merlin acquired Testa Inmuebles en Renta from Sacyr for €1.793 billion. On 21 December 2015, the company joined the IBEX 35, becoming the first Spanish REIT (SOCIMI) to be included in the index.

In October 2016, Merlin completed a merger with Metrovacesa's commercial real estate portfolio, valued at €9.317 billion in GAV. Following the transaction, Banco Santander became the company's largest shareholder with a 21.9% stake, and Rodrigo Echenique was appointed non-executive chairman.

== Appointments and recognition ==
Since November 2025, Clemente has served on the advisory board of Edmond de Rothschild in Spain. He is also a member of the Executive Committee of the Urban Land Institute (ULI) Spain.

His individual recognitions include the 2025 MDI Award from the Universidad Politécnica de Madrid, the 2020 PEC Award from CESUR as "Best Executive Ambassador of Southern Spain", and the runner-up position for the 2021 Tintero Award granted by the Association of Economic Information Journalists (APIE).
