= Lindsay, Nebraska =

- Village
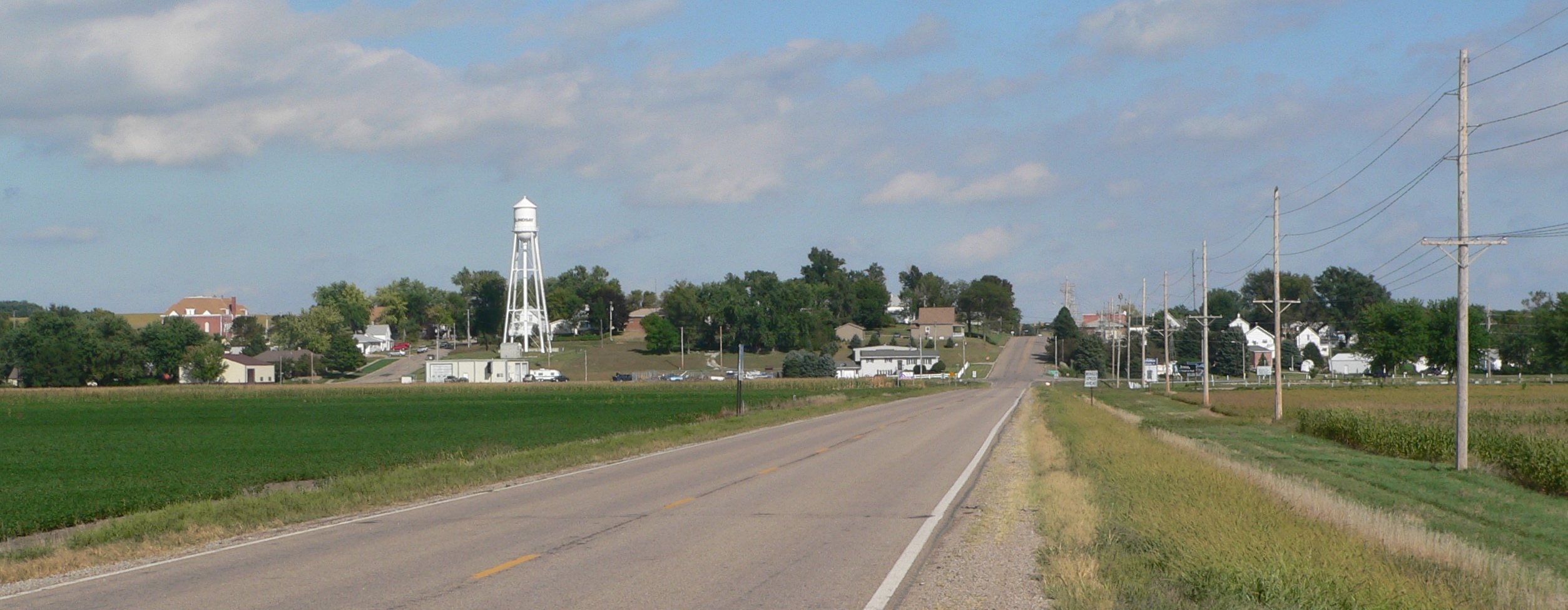
- Lindsay, seen from the west on Nebraska Highway 91, September 2010

- Location of Lindsay, Nebraska
- Coordinates: 41°41′57″N 97°41′38″W
- Country: United States
- State: Nebraska
- County: Platte

Area
  - Total: 0.48 sq mi (1.24 km^{2})
  - Land: 0.47 sq mi (1.23 km^{2})
  - Water: 0.0077 sq mi (0.02 km^{2})
- Elevation: 1,680 ft (510 m)

Population (2020)
  - Total: 283
  - Density: 597.2/sq mi (230.59/km^{2})
- Time zone: UTC-6 (Central (CST))
  - Summer (DST): UTC-5 (CDT)
- ZIP code: 68644
- Area code: 402
- FIPS code: 31-28105
- GNIS feature ID: 2398445

Lindsay is a village in Platte County, Nebraska, United States. As of the 2020 census, Lindsay had a population of 283.

== Geography ==
According to the United States Census Bureau, the village has a total area of 0.34 square miles (0.88 km^{2}), all land.

== History ==
=== Founding and naming ===
In 1862, subject to the provisions of the Homestead Act, Families began settling in the fertile land near Shell Creek. Lindsay was platted in 1886. A large share of the early settlers being natives of Lindsay, Ontario, Canada caused the name to be selected. Lindsay was incorporated as a village on March 7, 1888.

=== Early 20th century ===
By the early 20th century, Lindsay had an electric utility and water system comprising a 100-ft well and a 60,000-gallon tank.

The Chicago and North Western Railroad's Albion Line consisted of 115 miles of tracks through Lindsay, on which were operated four freight trains and two passenger trains daily. By 1917, the population of Lindsay had grown to almost 500 people.

=== Lindsay Corporation ===
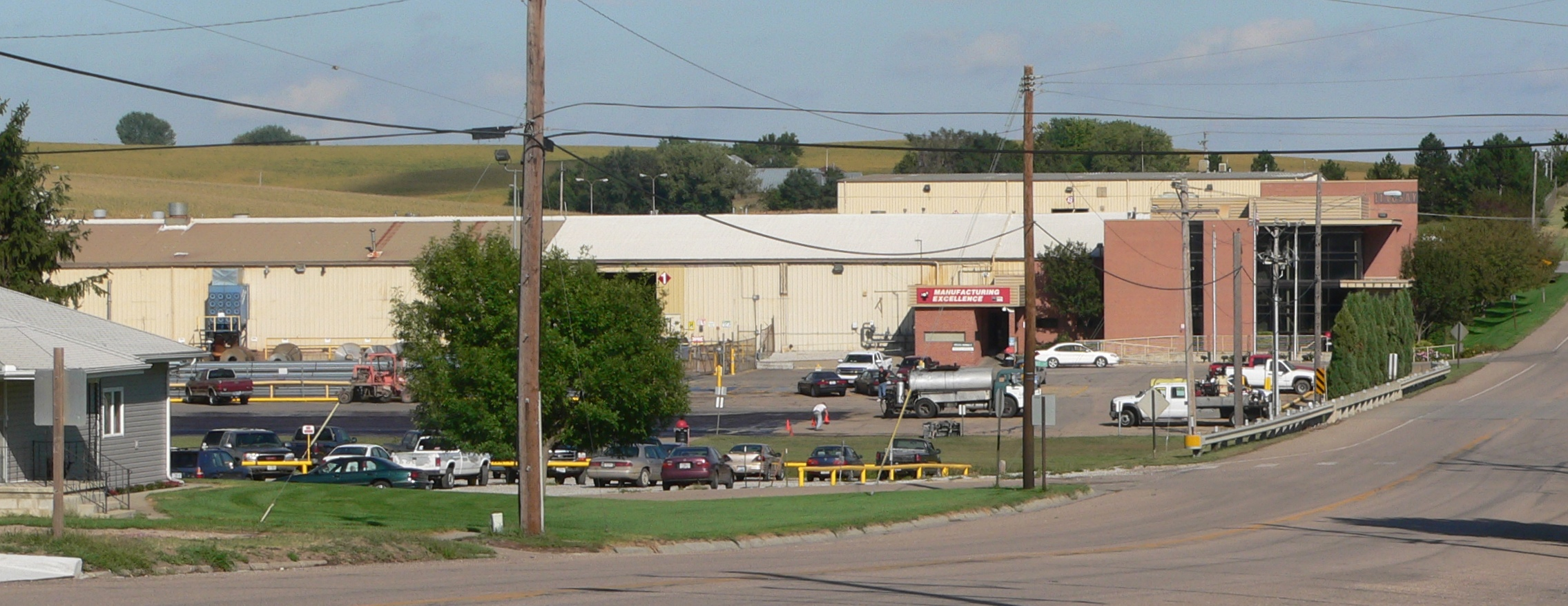
Lindsay Manufacturing plant in Lindsay

What is now the Lindsay Corporation was founded in the village in 1955 by Paul Zimmerer as the Lindsay Manufacturing Company to be a maker of irrigation and farm automation equipment. The company has retained a manufacturing facility in Lindsay, but is now headquartered in Omaha, Nebraska and its stock is traded on the New York Stock Exchange with a ticker symbol of LNN. In 2005, the company accounted for 80% of employment in Lindsay, employing about 460 persons of the village's total employment of 577.

== Demographics ==
Historical population
Census	Pop.	Note	%±
1890	125		—
1900	316		152.8%
1910	465		47.2%
1920	490		5.4%
1930	456		−6.9%
1940	332		−27.2%
1950	247		−25.6%
1960	218		−11.7%
1970	291		33.5%
1980	383		31.6%
1990	321		−16.2%
2000	276		−14.0%
2010	255		−7.6%
2020	283		11.0%
U.S. Decennial Census

=== 2010 census ===
As of the census of 2010, there were 255 people, 111 households, and 77 families residing in the village. The population density was 750.0 inhabitants per square mile (289.6/km^{2}). There were 127 housing units at an average density of 373.5 per square mile (144.2/km^{2}). The racial makeup of the village was 98.0% White, 1.2% from other races, and 0.8% from two or more races. Hispanic or Latino of any race were 1.6% of the population.

There were 111 households, of which 27.9% had children under the age of 18 living with them, 62.2% were married couples living together, 5.4% had a female householder with no husband present, 1.8% had a male householder with no wife present, and 30.6% were non-families. 28.8% of all households were made up of individuals, and 17.1% had someone living alone who was 65 years of age or older. The average household size was 2.30 and the average family size was 2.77.

The median age in the village was 48.2 years. 22% of residents were under the age of 18; 4.6% were between the ages of 18 and 24; 19.2% were from 25 to 44; 30.6% were from 45 to 64; and 23.5% were 65 years of age or older. The gender makeup of the village was 50.2% male and 49.8% female.

=== 2000 census ===
As of the census of 2000, there were 276 people, 124 households, and 73 families residing in the village. The population density was 808.0 inhabitants per square mile (312.0/km^{2}). There were 136 housing units at an average density of 398.1 per square mile (153.7/km^{2}). The racial makeup of the village was 100.00% White. Hispanic or Latino of any race were 0.36% of the population.

There were 124 households, out of which 25.0% had children under the age of 18 living with them, 54.8% were married couples living together, 3.2% had a female householder with no husband present, and 41.1% were non-families. 40.3% of all households were made up of individuals, and 19.4% had someone living alone who was 65 years of age or older. The average household size was 2.23 and the average family size was 3.07.

In the village, the population was spread out, with 24.6% under the age of 18, 6.9% from 18 to 24, 21.4% from 25 to 44, 23.2% from 45 to 64, and 23.9% who were 65 years of age or older. The median age was 43 years. For every 100 females, there were 112.3 males. For every 100 females age 18 and over, there were 110.1 males.

As of 2000 the median income for a household in the village was $32,232, and the median income for a family was $45,313. Males had a median income of $28,750 versus $17,500 for females. The per capita income for the village was $17,103. About 3.7% of families and 10.6% of the population were below the poverty line, including 10.5% of those under the age of eighteen and 13.2% of those 65 or over.

== See also ==
- List of municipalities in Nebraska
