= RobecoSAM =

Robeco Schweiz AG Robeco Suisse SA Robeco Switzerland Ltd
- Company type: Subsidiary
- Industry: Financial services
- Founded: 1995
- Headquarters: Zurich, Switzerland
- Products: Asset management; Indices; Private equity
- Number of employees: 120
- Parent: Robeco
- Website: robeco.com

RobecoSAM co-founded the Dow Jones Sustainability Indices in 1999 and published them jointly with S&P Dow Jones Indices until 2019. RobecoSAM was an investment company based in Zurich, Switzerland, focused on sustainability investments. It was founded in 1995 by Reto Ringger and considered economic, environmental, and social criteria in its investment strategies. In addition to asset management, the company managed indexes and private equity. In 2006, RobecoSAM introduced a division called sustainability services that provided sustainability benchmarking reports to companies; this business, including the Corporate Sustainability Assessment, was acquired by S&P Global in 2020. In 2001, the then-RobecoSAM became the first carbon neutral company in Switzerland. RobecoSAM co-founded the *Dow Jones Sustainability Indices* in 1999 and published them jointly with S&P Dow Jones Indices until 2019; the publication is now managed solely by S&P Dow Jones Indices. In 2006 RobecoSAM introduced a division called sustainability services that provides sustainability benchmarking reports to companies. In 2001, the then-RobecoSAM became the first carbon neutral company in Switzerland.

== See also ==
- Dow Jones Sustainability Index
- Dow Jones Indexes
- World Water Index
