= Lindsay Corporation =

American manufacturer of center pivot irrigation systems

Coordinates: 41.279655°N 96.085761°W

- Company type: Public
- Traded as: NYSE: LNN; S&P 600 Component
- Industry: Manufacturing, Agriculture
- Founded: 1955; 71 years ago
- Founder: Paul Zimmerer and Sons
- Headquarters: Omaha, Nebraska, United States
- Key people: Michael N. Christodolou; Chairman; Randy Wood (CEO)
- Products: Center Pivot Irrigation, Tubing, Railroad Signal Infrastructure, Moveable Barrier Systems, Crash Cushions
- Services: Contract Manufacturing
- Revenue: $478,900,000 (2011)
- Operating income: $56,600,000 (2011)
- Net income: $36,800,000 (2011)
- Total assets: $381,144,000 (2011)
- Divisions: Irrigation, Infrastructure
- Subsidiaries: Barrier Systems Inc., Snoline, Watertronics
- Website: www.lindsay.com

Lindsay Corporation, formerly known as Lindsay Manufacturing Co., is a manufacturer of Zimmatic brand center pivot irrigation systems, based in Omaha, Nebraska, United States. It also manufactures farm and construction machinery, as well as road and railroad infrastructure equipment. At August 31, 2008, the company had 1,239 employees.

== History ==
The company was founded in 1955 in Lindsay, Nebraska. Corporate headquarters are in Omaha.

In 1992, Gary Parker of Lindsay Manufacturing Co. was named to the National Agri-Marketing Association Agribusiness Leader of the Year honor roll. Parker had started working at Lindsay Manufacturing in 1971, and went on to become the president in 1984 and the CEO in 1989. He retired from the position of CEO in 2000 at the age of 54.

On October 21, 1997, the company's shares began to be traded on the New York Stock Exchange. The company's shares form part of the Palisades Water Index's US Water Index.

In 2002, Howard G. Buffett was elected chairman of Lindsay Manufacturing. He had been a director of the company since 1995. Since January 21, 2003, the company's chairman has been Michael N. Christodolou.

In 2004, the company's African unit acquired Stettyn, a manufacturer of center pivots based in Bloemfontein, South Africa.

In June 2006, Lindsay acquired Barrier Systems Inc. which was founded in 1985 and developed the Quickchange Moveable Barrier (QMB) which helps control and manage traffic by adding lanes to a roadway during periods of heavy traffic and then removing the added lanes when the traffic influx is reversed.

On January 25, 2008, the outstanding shares of stock of Watertronics, Inc, based in Hartland, Wisconsin, were purchased by Lindsay. Watertronics is a leader in designing, manufacturing, and servicing water pumping stations and controls for the golf, landscape and municipal markets.

On November 3, 2010, Lindsay acquired WMC Technology Limited. The Colyton, New Zealand based company created the first commercially available variable-rate irrigation system in 2008, which uses solenoid valves to vary the amount of water applied under a center-pivot irrigator.

On April 27, 2017 Lindsay added FieldNET Advisor to its existing FieldNET platform, which uses a crop growth model to provide irrigation scheduling and recommendations to growers.
