= Orix =

Japanese financial services company

ORIX Corporation

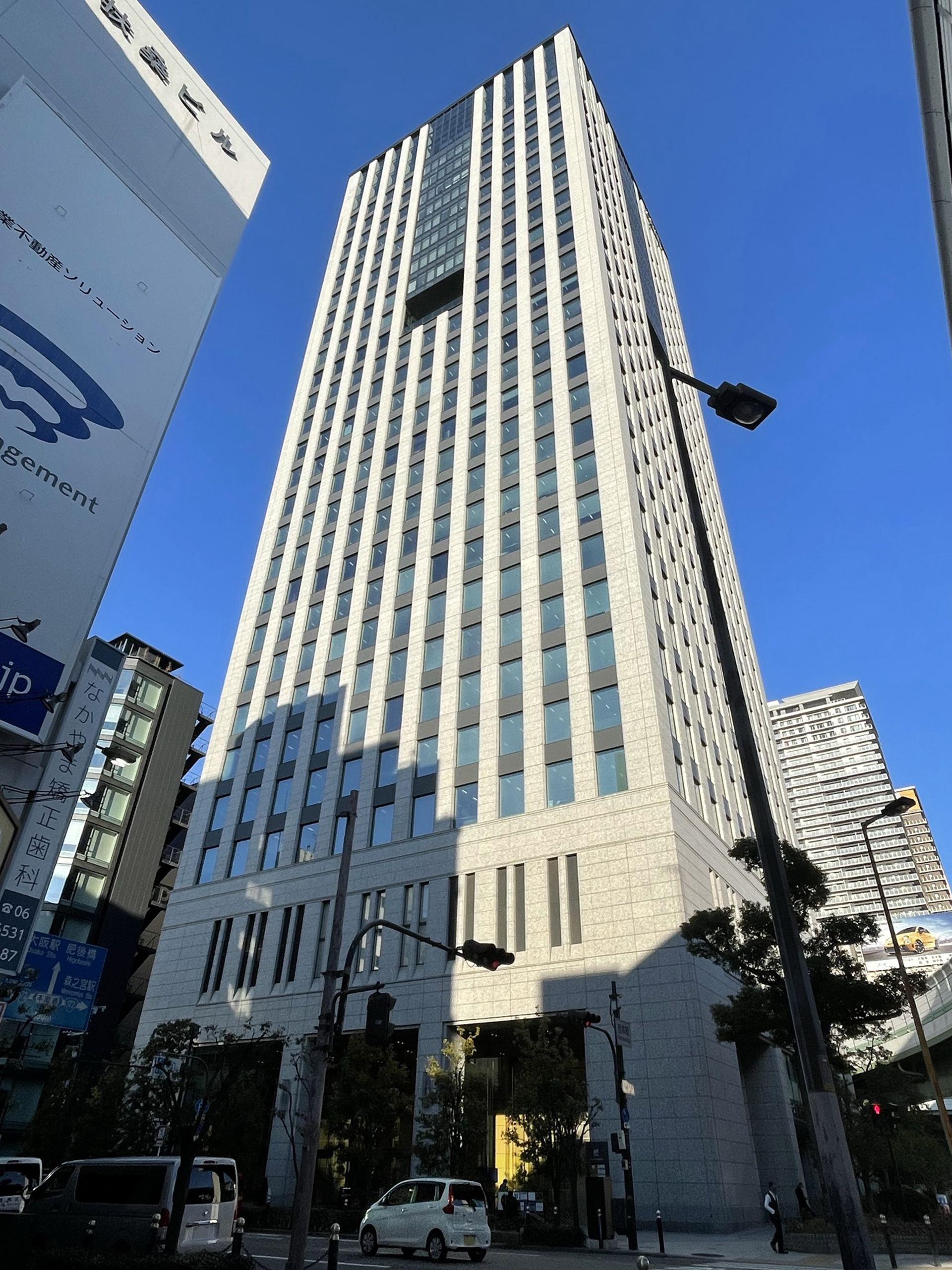
- Head Office (ORIX Hommachi building)
- Native name: オリックス株式会社
- Romanized name: Orikkusu Kabushiki-gaisha
- Formerly: Orient Leasing Co., Ltd. (1964-1989)
- Type: Public (K.K.)
- Traded as: TYO: 8591; NYSE: IX
- Industry: Financial services
- Founded: April 17, 1964; 62 years ago
- Headquarters: World Trade Center Building, SOUTH TOWER, Hamamatsucho, Minato, Tokyo; ORIX Hommachi Building, Nishi-Hommachi, Nishi-ku, Osaka, Japan
- Key people: Yoshihiko Miyauchi, Senior Chairman
- Products: Investment Banking
- Revenue: ▲¥ 2,520.3 billion (March, 2022)
- Net income: ▲¥ 317.6 billion (March, 2022)
- Number of employees: 32,235 (March, 2022)
- Subsidiaries: Robeco; Boston Partners
- Website: www.orix.co.jp/grp/en/

ORIX Corporation (オリックス株式会社, Orikkusu Kabushiki-gaisha), styled as ORIX, is a Japanese diversified financial services group headquartered in Minato, Tokyo, and Osaka, Japan.

ORIX offers leasing, lending, rentals, life insurance, real estate financing and development, venture capital, investment and retail banking, commodities funds and securities brokering. In addition to expanding its offerings, ORIX has also expanded globally, offering financial services in North America, Asia, the Middle East and Northern Africa. Divisions include Japan-based ORIX Auto Leasing Corporation, which operates in other countries through subsidiaries such as ORIX Auto Leasing (Thailand) Co., Ltd. It is also known for being the majority owner of the ORIX Buffaloes baseball team in Nippon Professional Baseball.

== History ==
ORIX was established April 17, 1964 as Orient Leasing Co., Ltd. The company's name was changed to ORIX Corporation in 1989.

ORIX was originally a subsidiary of the trading house Nichimen (now Sojitz). Yoshihiko Miyauchi transferred to the company from Nichimen and went on to serve as its chairman and CEO, taking a key role in expanding its leasing business into a global player. Following his retirement in 2014, he was paid a 4.4 billion yen retirement bonus, an amount generally unheard of in the Japanese corporate world.

In 2006, Orix USA acquired a majority stake in the investment bank Houlihan Lokey to address the growing international demand for middle-market investment banking services. Houlihan Lokey opened offices in Hong Kong and Tokyo in 2007.

As of 2007, ORIX was Japan's largest leasing and leading diversified financial services conglomerate with assets in excess of US$69 billion and subsidiaries & associates in 24 countries worldwide.

In early 2009, ORIX management advised employees worldwide that due to suffering a series of losses because of the economic downturn, a retrenchment of 10% of its employees would occur. In turn this resulted in the termination of approx 600 individuals' employment contracts.

On July 1, 2013 ORIX has acquired approximately 90.01% of the equity in Dutch asset manager Robeco from Rabobank also from the Netherlands. The total sale price was €1,937 million (JPY 250.7 billion). Robeco will help Orix to pursue its growth ambitions in global asset management.

ORIX and Vinci SA won a 45-year contract in 2015 to operate Itami Airport and Kansai International Airport in Osaka Prefecture, at a price of around US$18 billion.

In 2025, ORIX USA acquired a majority stake in the financial services holding company Hilco Global.
