= Robeco =

Dutch asset management firm

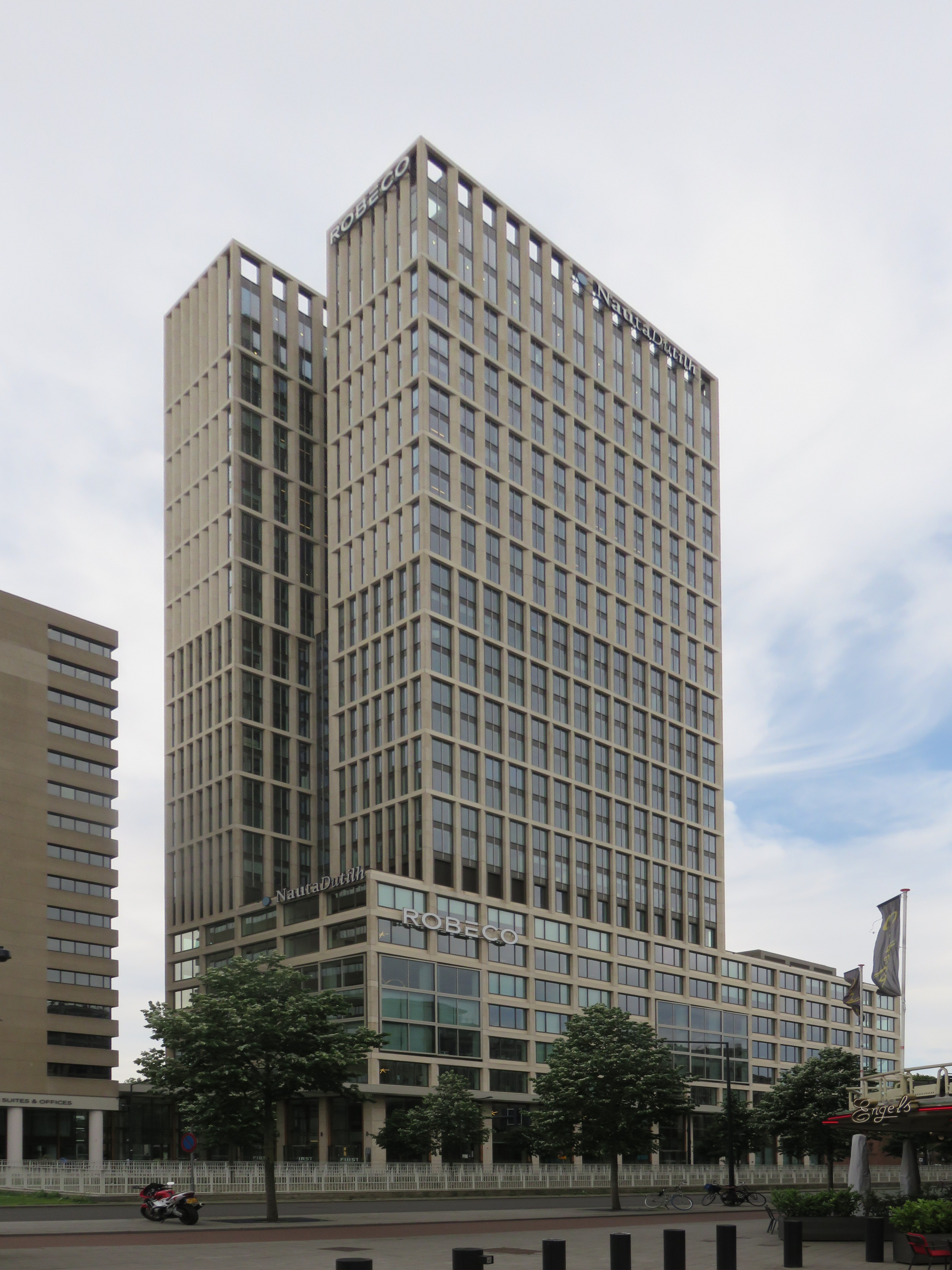
- Robeco's current headquarters, Rotterdam
- Type: Subsidiary
- Industry: Financial services
- Founded: 1929; 97 years ago
- Headquarters: Rotterdam, Netherlands
- Key people: Karin van Baardwijk (Chairwoman of the Robeco Executive Committee, since 1 January 2022)
- Products: Asset Management
- Operating income: ▲€ 583 million (2018)
- Net income: ▲€ 88 million (2018)
- AUM: €197.6 billion (2024)
- Number of employees: 741 (fte, average 2018)
- Parent: ORIX Corporation (100%)

Robeco is an originally Dutch asset management firm, which is now part of Orix. The company was founded in 1929 as the Rotterdamsch Beleggings Consortium (Rotterdam Investment Consortium). As of 2024, the company had €197 billion of assets under management. It was acquired in 2001 by the Rabobank Groep and sold in 2013 to ORIX Corporation.

Robeco offers assets management services to both institutional and private investors. The funds for private investors are available through Robeco itself and other financial institutions.

== History ==
In 1929, a group of businessmen from Rotterdam founded the Rotterdamsch Beleggings Consortium (Rotterdam Investment Consortium) and the Robeco fund. The portfolio is diversified globally over the Netherlands, other European countries, North and South America, and the Dutch East Indies.

The company had a startup capital of almost 2 million guilders, but by mid-1932, less than half was left. The company managed to survive the 1930s and grew during World War II by heavily investing in the United States. During WWII, from 1940 to 1945, almost half of the portfolio was invested in the US.

As a result, Robeco’s assets increased by almost 90% between 1939 and 1946. Robeco introduced a share-saving system, allowing people of more modest means to save up for Robeco shares in 1953. New listings were established in Paris (1959), Brussels (1960), London (1962) and numerous other European financial centers. Listings are also obtained in Hong Kong (1971) and Tokyo (1976). In 1963, Robeco became one of the first foreign investors to enter the Japanese stock market.

Rolinco, a second mutual fund for investors more interested in capital growth than taxable dividend, was founded in 1965. Robeco Group is also founded. The company became the largest mutual fund in Europe in 1969. Rorento, Robeco’s first bond fund, was founded in 1974 as an answer to the oil crisis in 1973. Robeco opens offices in various European countries, including France, Luxembourg and Switzerland in the 1980s.

The company started a close cooperation with the Rabobank in 1990, which would eventually lead to the takeover of Robeco by the Rabobank in 2001. Robeco DuurzaamAandelen [Sustainable Equities], the first sustainable equity fund launched by a Dutch mainstream asset manager, was introduced in 1999. The following year, Robeco North America acquired Urban Shopping Centers.

In 2001, Robeco Group acquired Harbor Capital Advisors, an American provider of investment funds. Harbor selects the most suitable manager for each of its funds externally and outsources portfolio management to it. Robeco North America sold all of its Urban Shopping Center investments in 2002, and acquired a 60% interest in Boston Partners, a value-equity manager based in Boston. The remaining shares were acquired in 2003.

Also, in 2002, Robeco Group acquired a 49% interest in Transtrend, a Rotterdam-based managed-futures trader with a track record going back to 1990. The remaining shares were acquired in 2007.

Logo as of 2005

Robeco Sustainable Private Equity was introduced in 2004 as the first sustainable private-equity fund of funds in the world, developed in cooperation with Rabobank. The company opened an office in Tokyo, Japan in 2005.

Robeco Clean Tech Private Equity II, an investment program aimed at clean-tech private-equity funds and co-investments, was developed in cooperation with Rabobank in 2006. That year, Robeco signed the United Nations’ Principles for Responsible Investment. The company also joined the Enhanced Analytics Initiative, a group of international asset owners and asset managers who work together to encourage investment research that considers the impact of extra-financial issues on long-term company performance.

Robeco acquired a 64% stake in Swiss based Sustainable Asset Management. SAM Group and Robeco Group join forces, which gives them a strong position in the market for sustainable investment.

For the Belgian market, Robeco Bank Belgium is sold to Kaupthing Bank Luxembourg in 2007. Robeco opened regional offices in Hong Kong for Mainland China, Hong Kong, Taiwan and Singapore. In 2009, Roderick Munsters became CEO of the company.

In 2010, Robeco implemented an integrated sustainable investment policy. In future, factors relating to the environment, society and good corporate governance will be fully taken into account in investment decisions. Robeco also introduced an exclusion policy; no investments will be made in certain companies, such as producers of controversial weapons such as cluster bombs.

In 2013, Rabobank Group announced that it was looking into the "strategic options" for its subsidiary Robeco Group as part of a strategic reorientation. In February 2013, Rabobank announced the sale of Robeco Group to ORIX Corporation of Japan. ORIX acquired about 90.01% of the equity in Robeco Group from Rabobank for €1,935 million (JPY 240.2 billion).

In September 2015, Munsters stepped down as CEO and was replaced by David Steyn.

ORIX acquired the remaining 10% of Robeco in 2016, and introduced a new organisational structure for the company. Robeco Group became a holding entity with various asset management subsidiaries such as Boston Partners, Harbor Capital Advisors, Transtrend, RobecoSAM and Robeco.

Makoute Inoue, the Japanese CEO of ORIX, is in charge of the holding company following approval by the regulator. Board member Leni Boeren leads the structural change and leaves Robeco when this process is completed. Gilbert Van Hassel is appointed CEO and Chairman of the Board of Robeco Institutional Asset Management in September.

In 2018, Robeco Group rebranded as ORIX Corporation Europe.

The development of the amount of asset under management (AuM) of Robeco Group was as follows:

| Year | AuM (in € m) |
|---|---|
| 24 March 1934 | 0.5 |
| 1939 | 6.8 |
| 1949 | 20.9 |
| 1959 | 248.2 |
| 1969 | 2,030 |
| 1978 | 4,629 |
| 1 July 1987 | 15,880 |
| 1999 | 85,400 |
| 2008 | 110,700 |
| 2009 | 134,900 |
| 2010 | 149,600 |
| 2011 | 150,300 |
| 2012 | 189,000 |
| 2013 | 205,000 |
| 2014 | 246,000 |
| 2015 | 268,000 |
| 2016 | 281,000 |

In May 2016, it was decided to separate the activities of the subsidiaries - including Robeco - from those of Robeco Group. The figure below provides an overview of the assets under management (AuM) of Robeco since 2017:

| Year | AuM (in € b) |
|---|---|
| 2017 | 150 |
| 2018 | 167 |

== Performance ==
The stocks managed by Robeco performed better than the benchmark over the period 2004-2006, beating the benchmark on average with 0.89%. However performance was weaker over 2006 than it was over 2004 and 2005. The bonds managed by Robeco performed below the benchmark. In 2016, 69% of the funds outperformed the benchmark over a three-year period. The comparable figure for 2015 was 74%. In 2017 79%, and in 2018 51% of the funds outperformed the benchmark over a three-year period.

== Global presence ==
Robeco currently has offices in the following countries;

- Netherlands International headquarters; Robeco Institutional Asset Management
- Australia Robeco Hong Kong Ltd (Sydney)
- China Robeco Greater China and South East Asia (Hong Kong)
- France Robeco France (Paris)
- Germany Robeco Germany (Frankfurt)
- Japan Robeco Japan clients (Tokyo)
- Spain Robeco Spain (Madrid)
- (United Arab Emirates) UAE Robeco Middle East (Dubai)
- Switzerland Robeco Switzerland (Zurich)
- United Kingdom Robeco UK (London)
- (United States) Robeco Institutional Asset Management U.S.
- (India) Canara Robeco AMC

== Headquarters ==
Since 2016, Robeco is headquartered in the newly built 128-meter-tall (420 ft) FIRST Rotterdam office tower in the Rotterdam Central District. Before, the headquarters were located in the 95-meter-tall (312 ft) Robeco toren in Rotterdam on the corner of the Coolsingel and Blaak.
