= Merlin Properties =

Spanish real estate company

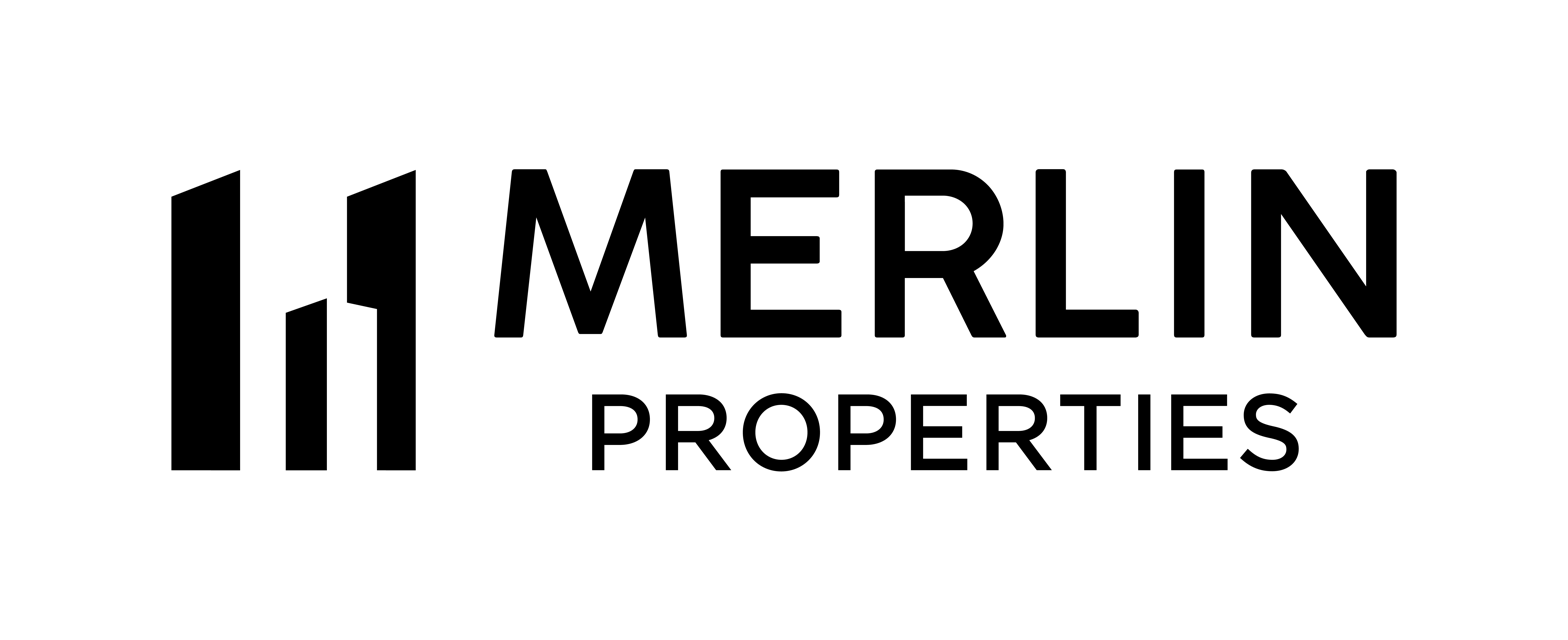

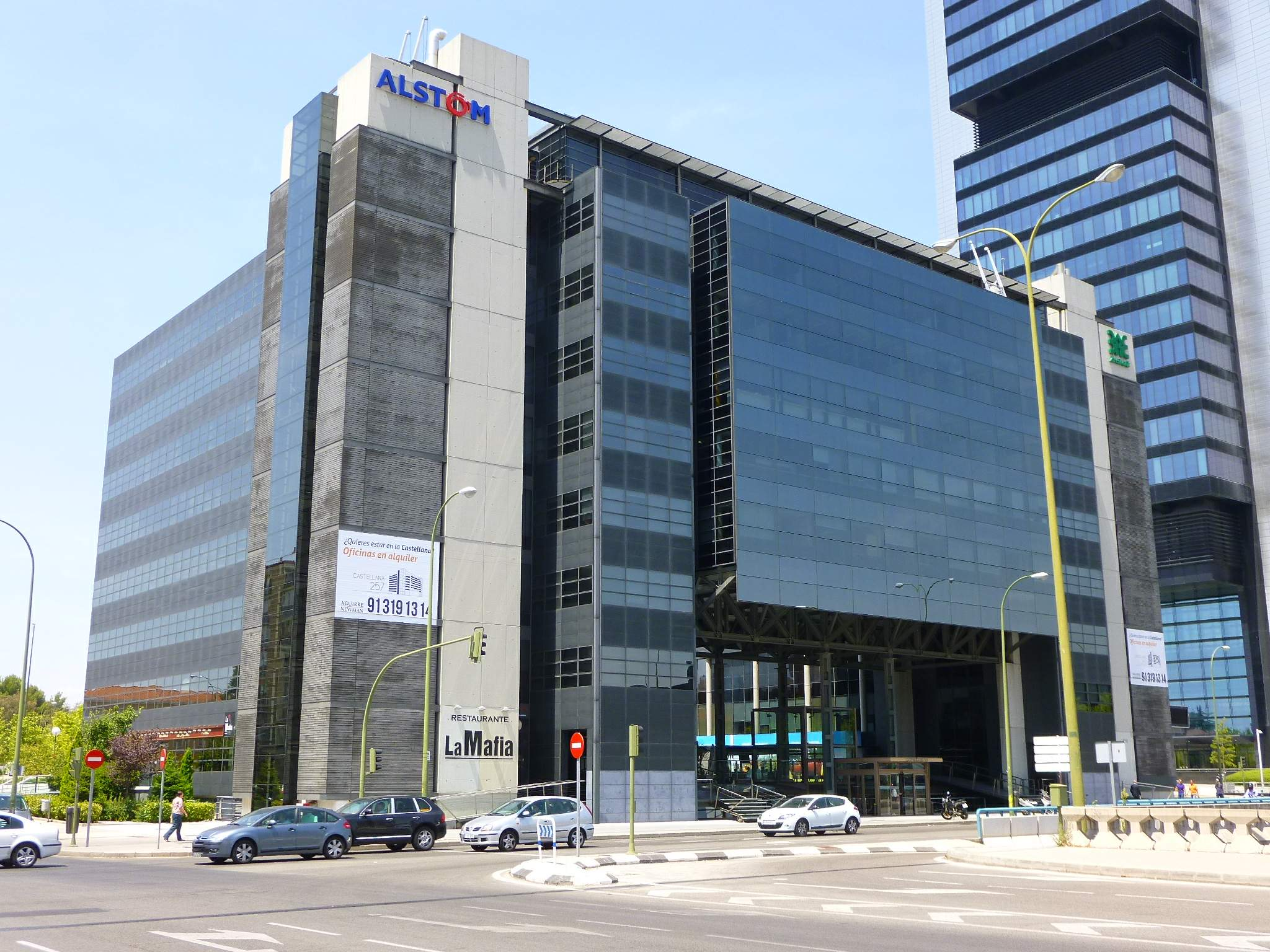
- Headquarters in Madrid, Spain.
- Type: REIT (REAL Estate Investment Trust)
- Traded as: BMAD: {{{2}}} IBEX 35 component
- ISIN: ES0105025003
- Industry: Real Estate
- Founded: 2014
- Headquarters: Madrid, Spain
- Key people: José Luis de Mora Gil-Gallardo
- Revenue: ▼€541.9 million (2025)
- Net income: ▼€786.1 million (2025)
- Total assets: ▲€12.63 billion (2025)
- Owner: Banco Santander, Nortia, and BlackRock
- Number of employees: 295 (2025)
- Website: www.merlinproperties.com/en/

MERLIN Properties SOCIMI, S.A. is a Spanish real estate investment trust (REIT) focused on the acquisition and management of commercial assets and infrastructure in the Iberian Peninsula. The company operates primarily in the office, shopping center, logistics, and data center segments.

The company is a constituent of several stock market indices, including the IBEX 35, STOXX Europe 600, FTSE EPRA/NAREIT, GPR Global Index, GPR-250 Index, MSCI Small Caps indices and the Dow Jones Sustainability Index (DJSI).

== History ==
Founded in 2014 by former Deutsche Bank executives, the firm expanded its portfolio through the acquisition of Testa from Sacyr in 2015 and the integration of Metrovacesa's commercial assets in 2016.

In 2020 and 2021, during the COVID-19 pandemic, several Spanish courts of law ordered the company to halt the eviction and to maintain rent discounts for some commercial tenants after they had previously filed the corresponding lawsuits.

== Board of Directors ==
The company's Board of Directors consists of the following members:

Board of Directors
Position	Name
Chairman of the Board	José Luis de Mora Gil-Gallardo
CEO and Vice Chairman	Ismael Clemente
Shareholder Related	Francisca Ortega Hernández-Agero
Independent Director	Pilar Cavero Mestre
Independent Director	Juan María Aguirre Gonzalo
Shareholder Related	Fernando López Muñoz
Independent Director	Inés Archer-Toper
Proprietary Director	Julia Bayón Pedraza
Independent Director	Olaf Díaz - Pintado
Independent Director	Regina Garay Salazar
Independent Director	Maria Teresa Pulido Mendoza
Secretary (Non-Director)	Mónica Martín de Vidales
Deputy Secretary (Non-Director)	Ildefonso Polo del Mármol

== Management team ==
The company's management team consists of the following members as of 2024:

Management Team
Position	Name
CEO / Vice-Chairman	Ismael Clemente
Director	Miguel Oñate
Director	Francisco Rivas
Director	Luis Lázaro
Director	Fernando Ramírez
Director	Inés Arellano
Director	Manuel García Casas
Director	Fernando Ferrero
Director	David Martínez
