= Yoshihiko Miyauchi =

Japanese businessman (born 1935)

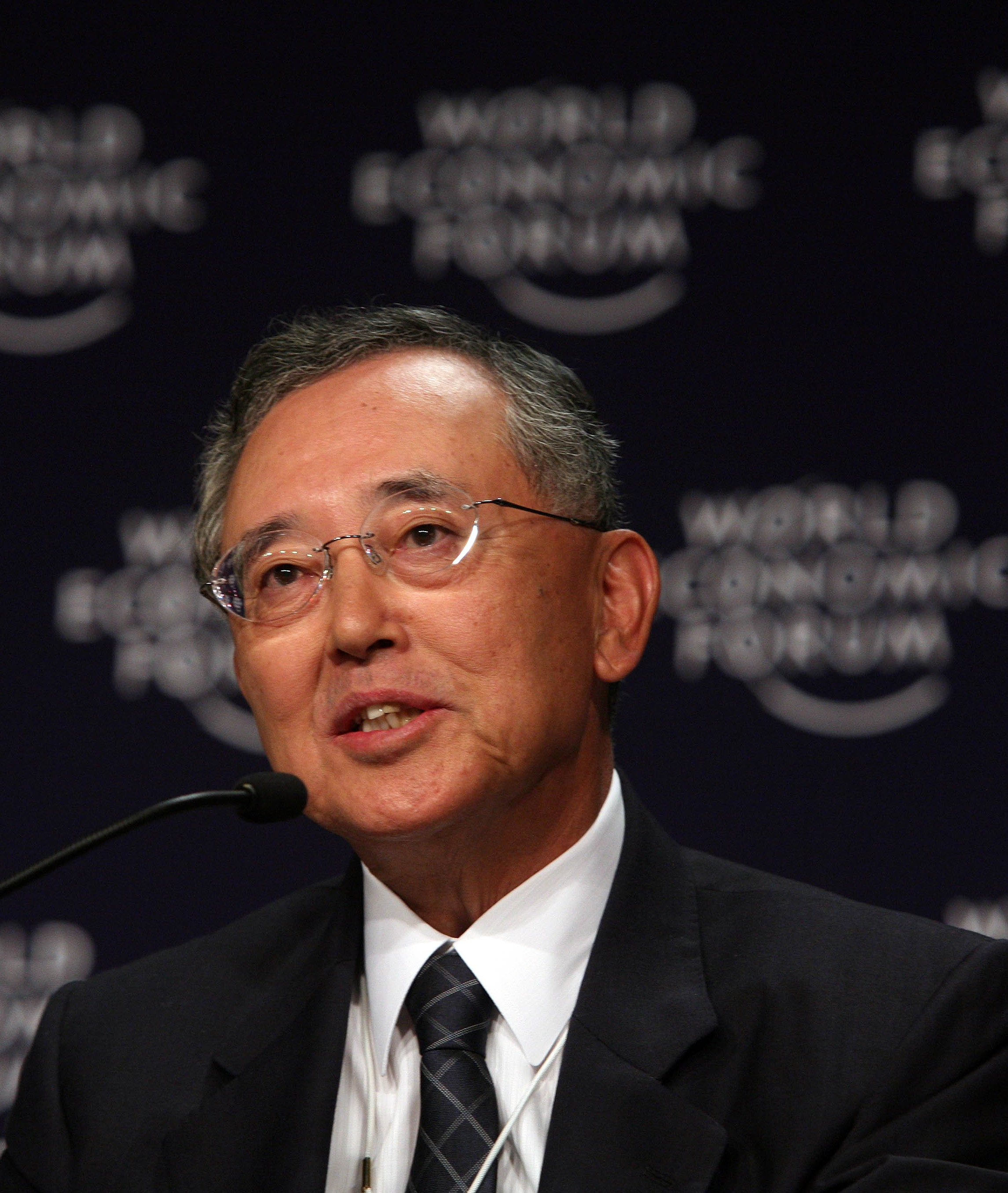
- Born: September 13, 1935 (age 90); Japan
- Education: Kwansei Gakuin University, University of Washington
- Occupations: Chairman and CEO, Orix

Yoshihiko Miyauchi (宮内 義彦, Miyauchi Yoshihiko; born September 13, 1935) is a Japanese businessman. He is Senior Chairman of ORIX Corp. and was a former CEO of Orix. Miyauchi served as President of the Council for Promoting Regulatory Reform in Japan. As of 2007, ORIX was Japan's largest leasing and leading diversified financial services conglomerate with assets in excess of US$69 billion and subsidiaries & associates in 24 countries worldwide.

Miyauchi received a BA from Kwansei Gakuin University in 1958, followed by an MBA in 1960 from the University of Washington in Seattle, Washington. Upon completing his MBA, Miyauchi returned to Japan and in 1964 joined a small startup, Orient Leasing Co. Ltd., that helped pioneer the lease financing of machinery and industrial equipment for Japan's booming manufacturing base. Now known as ORIX Corporation, the company expanded rapidly during the 1960s and '70s, diversifying the range of its products and services to include ships and aircraft, along with real estate finance and development. Miyauchi became president and CEO of ORIX in 1980, and then as chairman and CEO in 2000, before stepping down and assuming the position of Senior Chairman of ORIX in June 2014.

In addition to Miyauchi's strictly business decisions, he also oversaw ORIX's 1988 purchase of the Orix Braves, renamed the Orix BlueWave, and later the Orix Buffaloes.

In addition to being one of Japan's top corporate leaders, Miyauchi is a strong advocate of regulatory reform and served as president of the Council for Promoting Regulatory Reform, an advisory board to the prime minister of Japan. In this capacity, he is often referred to as "Mr. Deregulation" and has been described as the free market economy czar of Japan. He serves as a director on the boards of many major corporations including Fuji Xerox, Showa Shell Sekiyu and Sony.
