= List of University of Washington people =

This page lists notable students, alumni and faculty members of the University of Washington.

== Notable alumni ==
=== Nobel laureates ===
- Mary E. Brunkow (B.S. 1983) – Physiology and Medicine, 2025
- Linda B. Buck (B.S. 1975) – Physiology and Medicine, 2004
- Jeffrey C. Hall (Ph.D. 1971) – Physiology and Medicine, 2017
- George H. Hitchings (1927, 1928) – Physiology and Medicine, 1988
- Martin Rodbell (Ph.D. 1954) – Physiology and Medicine, 1994
- George J. Stigler (B.A. 1931) – Sveriges Riksbank Prize in Economic Sciences in Memory of Alfred Nobel, 1982

=== Academic administration and teaching ===
- Fouad Ajami (1945–2014) – Lebanese-born American scholar, author, and professor
- Lloyd Barber – president emeritus; former president and former vice chancellor of the University of Regina
- H. Kim Bottomly – former president of Wellesley College
- Paul Brass – expert on the politics of India
- Jonathan Bricker – clinical psychologist, academic, and scientist
- Ron Chew – museum professional
- Geraldine Dawson (PhD 1979) – professor of Psychiatry, University of North Carolina, Chapel Hill; chief science officer, Autism Speaks
- William C. Dement (1951) – professor of Psychiatry and Behavioral Sciences at Stanford University School of Medicine; division chief of the Stanford University Division of Sleep; founding president of the American Sleep Disorders Association, now the American Academy of Sleep Medicine
- Mark Emmert (1975) – former president of the University of Washington; current president of the NCAA
- Elaine Tuttle Hansen – former president of Bates College in Lewiston, Maine
- Yehuda Hayuth – Israeli professor of geography, and president of the University of Haifa
- Karen A. Holbrook (PhD 1972) – former president of Ohio State University
- Hean Tat Keh (PhD 1998) – professor of Marketing at Monash University
- Elizabeth Topham Kennan – former president of Mount Holyoke College
- Michael Mackey (PhD) – professor of Physiology and Joseph Morley Drake Chair in Physiology at McGill University
- John G. Matsusaka – Charles F. Sexton Chair in American Enterprise, professor of Finance and Business Economics, Business and Law, and Political Science, at the University of Southern California
- Douglas Robinson (PhD 1983) – translation scholar, Chair Professor of English and Dean of the Arts Faculty at Hong Kong Baptist University
- Kermit Ritland – ecologist and geneticist
- Anne Salomon – associate professor with the School of Resource and Environmental Management in the Faculty of Environment at Simon Fraser University
- Greg Weisenstein (BA, MA) – president of West Chester University 2009–2016
- Ani Widyani (MA 1989) – Indonesian international relations academic and researcher

=== Aeronautics and astronautics ===
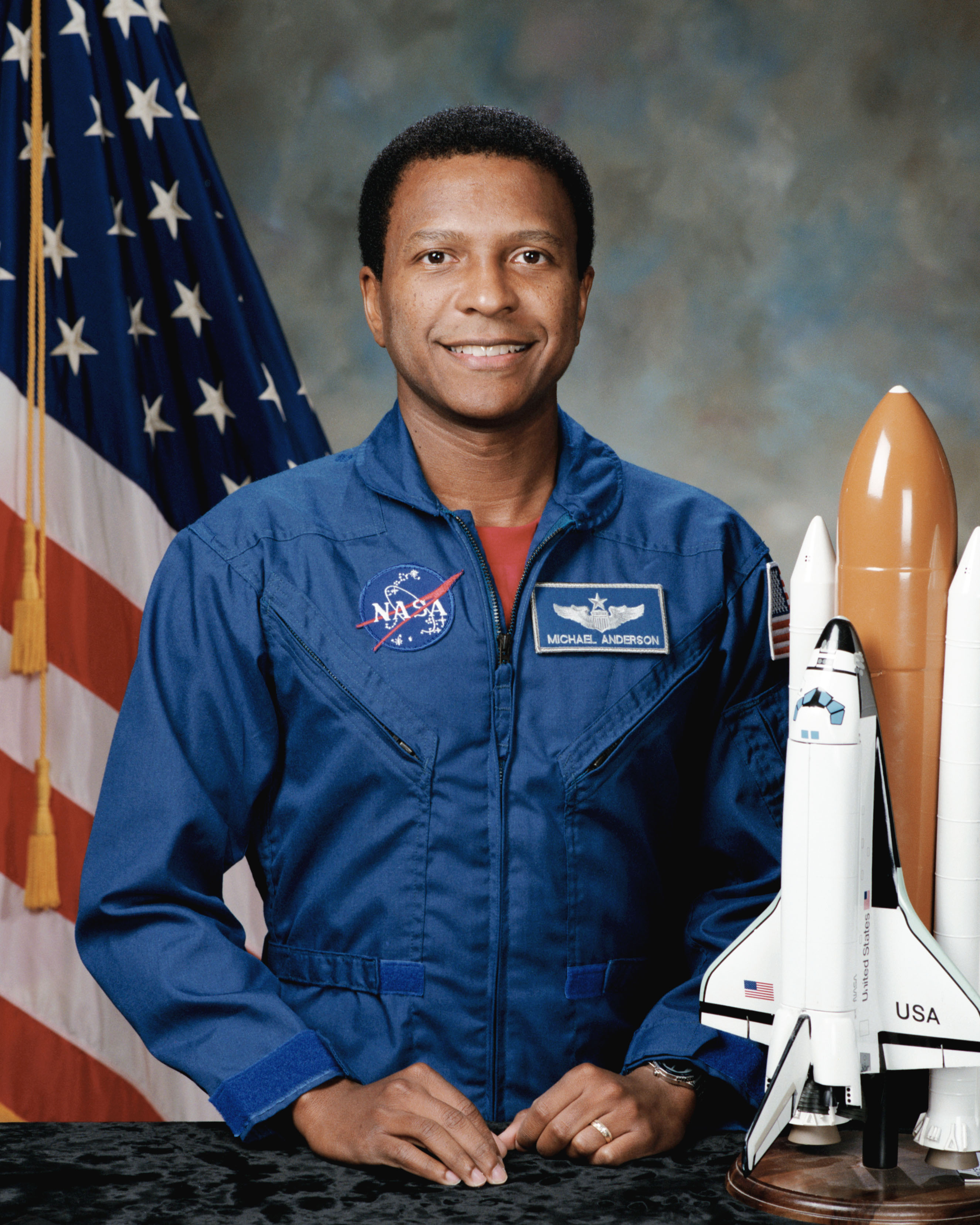
Michael P. Anderson, NASA astronaut and crew member of the Space Shuttle Columbia disaster

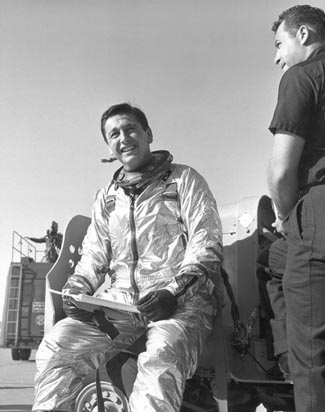
Scott Crossfield, test pilot

- Michael P. Anderson (1981) – NASA astronaut, crew member in the Space Shuttle Columbia disaster
- Michael R. Barratt (1981) – NASA astronaut and physician
- Albert Scott Crossfield (1949, 1950) – first man to fly faster than Mach 2; assisted in the design of, and piloted, the X-15
- Suzanna Darcy-Henneman (1981) – Boeing test pilot; Boeing 777 senior test pilot
- Ron Dittemore (1974, 1975) – Space Shuttle program manager of NASA
- Bonnie Dunbar (1971, 1975) – NASA astronaut; crew member on five Space Shuttle missions; has spent more than 1,200 hours (50 days) in space
- John M. Fabian (Ph.D. 1974) – NASA astronaut; crew member on two Space Shuttle missions
- Anita Eileen Gale (1951) – Boeing engineer, Space Shuttle and National Space Society
- Richard F. Gordon, Jr. (1951) – NASA astronaut, crew member of Gemini 11 and Apollo 12
- Robert J. Helberg (1932) – director of the Lunar Orbiter program
- Gregory C. Johnson (1977) – NASA astronaut; crew member of STS-125
- Stanley G. Love (1989, Ph.D. 1993) – NASA astronaut; crew member of STS-122; planetary scientist
- George C. Martin (1931) – former vice president of Engineering at Boeing; project engineer on the Boeing B-47; chief project engineer of the Boeing B-52
- George "Pinky" Nelson (1974, Ph.D. 1978) – NASA astronaut; crew member on three Space Shuttle missions
- Maynard Pennell (1931) – former vice president of Product Development at Boeing; responsible for the design of the Boeing 707, Boeing 720 and Boeing 727
- Joseph Sutter (1943) – chief designer of the Boeing 747
- Milton O. Thompson (1953) – NASA research pilot selected as an astronaut for the X-20 Dyna-Soar
- Joseph John "Tym" Tymczyszyn (1948) – test pilot of America's first commercial jet aircraft, the Boeing 707
- Dafydd Williams – Canadian astronaut and crew member of two Space Shuttle missions: STS-90 in 1998, and STS-118 in August 2007

=== Art and architecture ===
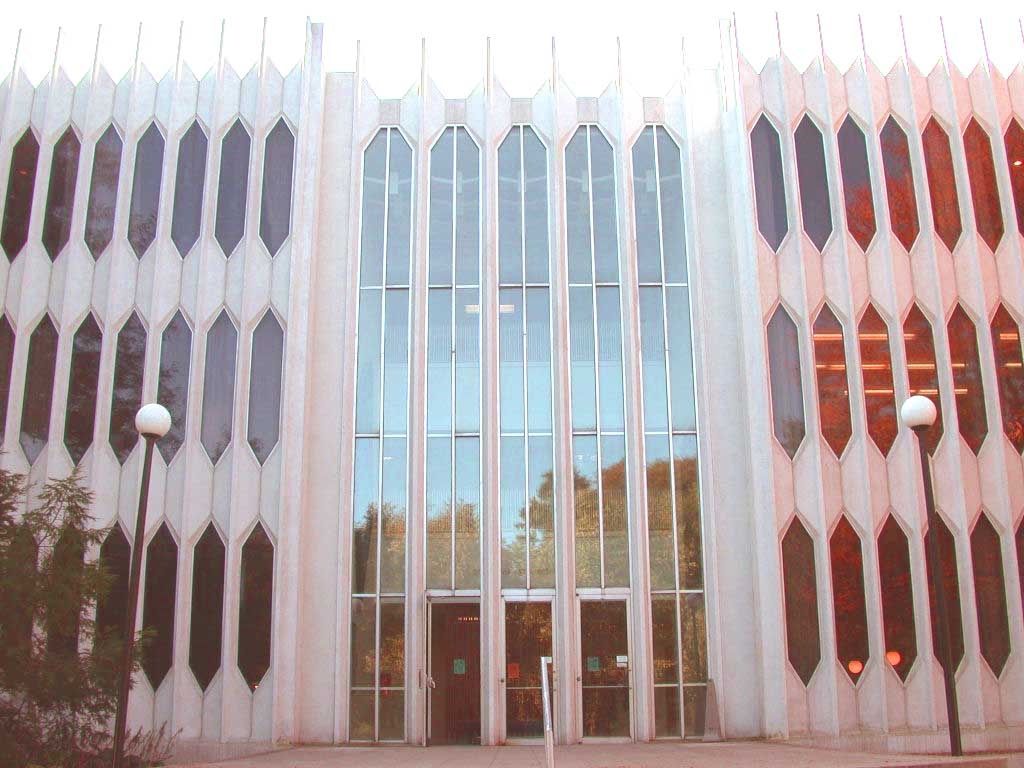
Facade showing the signature style of architect Minoru Yamasaki

- Deborah Aschheim (1990) – artist
- Nancy Carman (1976) – ceramist
- F. Lennox Campello (1981) – artist and critic
- Dale Chihuly (1965) – sculptor
- Chuck Close (1962) – painter
- Alfredo Arreguín (1967) – painter
- Roger Shimomura (1961) – painter
- Dan Corson (1964) – artist
- Fredericka Foster (1972) – artist and activist
- George Nakashima (1929) – woodworker and architect
- Martin Friedman – art historian
- Steven Holl (1970) – architect and watercolorist
- Diane Katsiaficas (M.F.A. 1976) – visual artist
- Paul Kuniholm (P.B.D. 2012) – artist
- Patricia J. Lancaster (M.A. 1981) – former commissioner of the New York City Department of Buildings
- Martina López – photographer
- John Pollini (1968) – art historian
- Norie Sato (M.F.A. 1974) – artist
- Alyson Shotz (M.F.A. 1991) – sculptor
- Victor Steinbrueck (1940) – architect and preservationist
- Paula Mary Turnbull – sculptor
- Wang Chiu-Hwa (1946) – architect
- Art Wolfe (1975) – photographer and conservationist
- Minoru Yamasaki (1934) – architect, noted for the design of the World Trade Center

=== Business and law ===
- Peter Adkison (1997) – founder and former CEO of Wizards of the Coast; US publisher of Magic: The Gathering, Dungeons & Dragons and Pokémon
- Harry Arend – justice of the Alaska Supreme Court
- William S. Ayer (1978) – president and CEO of Alaska Airlines
- David Bonderman (1963) – investment banker; acquired Continental Airlines; founder of Texas Pacific Group
- Donald Bren (1956) – chairman and sole shareholder of the Irvine Company, largest real estate developer in California; wealthiest real estate developer in the United States and 23rd richest American ($13 billion US), according to Forbes
- Andrew Brimmer (1950, 1951) – first African American on the Federal Reserve Board of Governors
- Jeffrey Brotman (1964, 1967) – founder and president of Costco
- Edward Carlson – former CEO of United Airlines and Westin Hotels
- Barbara Ann Crancer (JD) – former St. Louis County (Missouri) Associate Circuit Court judge; daughter of former Teamsters Union president Jimmy Hoffa
- Chris DeWolfe – CEO and co-founder of MySpace
- David Estudillo (1996, JD 1999): United States district judge of the United States District Court for the Western District of Washington
- John Fluke (1935) – founder of the Fluke Corporation of Everett, Washington
- Mary Maxwell Gates (1949) – first female chairperson of United Way (1985–1987); Seattle community leader; philanthropist; mother of Bill Gates
- Bill Gates Sr. (1949, JD 1950) – Seattle lawyer; philanthropist; father of Bill Gates
- Ivar Haglund (1928) – founder of Ivar's restaurant; folk singer
- Faith Ireland (1965) – associate justice of the Washington Supreme Court
- Irving Kanarek – aerospace engineer; legal defendant for Charles Manson
- Lauren J. King (2004) – United States district judge of the Western District of Washington
- Leonard H. Lavin – founder of Alberto Culver Company, maker of Alberto VO5 and Mrs. Dash products
- Arthur D. Levinson (1972) – chairman of Apple Inc. (2011–present); chairman of Genentech (1999–2014)
- Mike McGavick (1983) – former chairman and CEO of Safeco; 2006 Republican nominee for the U.S. Senate from Washington
- Salvador Mendoza Jr. (1994) – United States circuit judge of the United States Court of Appeals for the Ninth Circuit
- Yoshihiko Miyauchi (MBA 1960) – chairman and CEO of ORIX Corporation, the world's largest leasing conglomerate
- Raquel Montoya-Lewis (JD 1995): Washington Supreme Court justice
- Jill Otake (JD 1998) – United States district judge of the United States District Court for the District of Hawaii
- Donald Petersen (1946) – president of Ford Motor Company, 1985–1989; credited for its turnaround
- Irv Robbins (1939) – co-founder of Baskin & Robbins
- Steven Rogel (1965) – CEO of Weyerhauser
- Orin C. Smith (1965) – CEO of Starbucks, 2000–2005, and president, 1994–2005
- Dwight L. Stuart – CEO of Carnation
- James Sun (1999) – contestant on The Apprentice; chairman and co-founder of GeoPage
- Takuji Yamashita (1902) – early civil rights pioneer

=== Literature ===
==== Pulitzer Prize winners ====
- William Bolcom (1958) – Music, 1988; composer and winner of three Grammy Awards in 2006
- Timothy Egan (1981) – Journalism, 2001; journalist and author
- Ed Guthman (1941, 1944) – Journalism, 1949; journalist; former press secretary for Robert F. Kennedy; professor at the University of Southern California
- David Horsey (1975) – Editorial Cartooning, 1999, 2003; editorial cartoonist for the Seattle Post-Intelligencer
- Mike Luckovich (1982) – Editorial Cartooning, 1995; editorial cartoonist for The Atlanta Journal-Constitution
- Peter Rinearson (2005) – Pulitzer Prize for Feature Writing, 1984; aerospace reporter for The Seattle Times and later an author and software industry executive
- Marilynne Robinson (1968, 1977) – Pulitzer Prize for Fiction, 2005; novelist, author of Gilead and Housekeeping
- James Wright (1954, 1959) – Poetry, 1972; poet

==== National Book Award ====
- Beverly Cleary (1939) – Children's Books, Fiction, Paperback 1981
- Timothy Egan (1981) – Non-fiction 2006 for The Worst Hard Time: The Untold Story of Those Who Survived the Great American Dust Bowl

==== General ====
If no class year is listed, author may not have graduated.

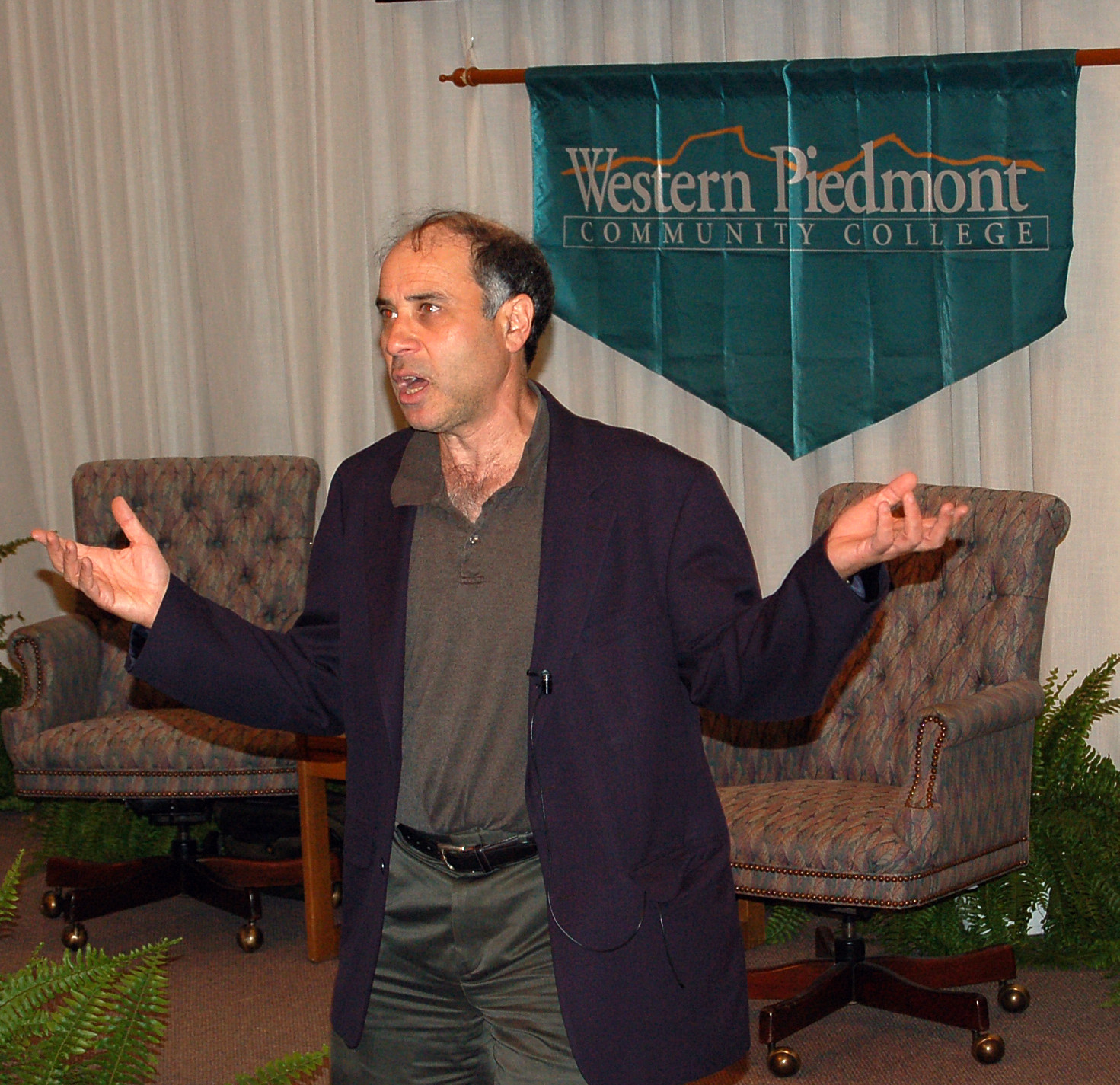
Robert Zubrin, science fiction writer

- Ralph Angel (graduated, year not known) – poet
- Linda Bierds (1969, 1971) – poet and MacArthur Fellowship recipient
- Peter Blecha (1974, 1988) – historian, author, essayist
- Matt Briggs (1995) – novelist and short story writer
- Emily Compagno – attorney and television journalist
- David Eddings (1961) – author of epic fantasy novels
- P. T. Deutermann (1970) – fiction author
- Joanna Fuhrman – poet
- Tess Gallagher (1967, 1971) – poet
- David Guterson (1978, 1982) – writer of novel Snow Falling on Cedars
- Kristin Halbrook (2001) – fiction author
- Kristin Hannah (1982) – author and New York Times best-seller
- Frank Herbert – science fiction writer, Dune
- Thom Jones (1970) – short story writer
- Kitty Kelley (1964) – investigative journalist and author
- Hank Ketcham – creator of the U.S. comic strip Dennis the Menace
- Ada Limón (1998) – 24th Poet Laureate Consultant in Poetry to the Library of Congress of the United States
- Suzanne Matson (1987) – fiction writer
- Donald E. McQuinn (circa 1951) – author of military and science fiction, retired U.S. Marine
- John Okada, author of No-No Boy
- John Patric (circa 1924, no degree awarded) – author of numerous books, magazine and newspaper articles, and libertarian periodicals
- Jean-Paul Pecqueur – poet
- Jerry Pournelle (1956, 1958, 1964) – science fiction author, technology journalist, and essayist
- Tom Robbins – author, Even Cowgirls Get the Blues
- Ann Rule (1953) – true crime author
- Marilyn Stablein (1981) – poet and author
- Alex Steffen – writer and editor
- John Straley (1977) – detective fiction author
- Robert Zubrin (1984, 1992) – science fiction writer and Mars exploration advocate

=== Government, politics & diplomacy ===
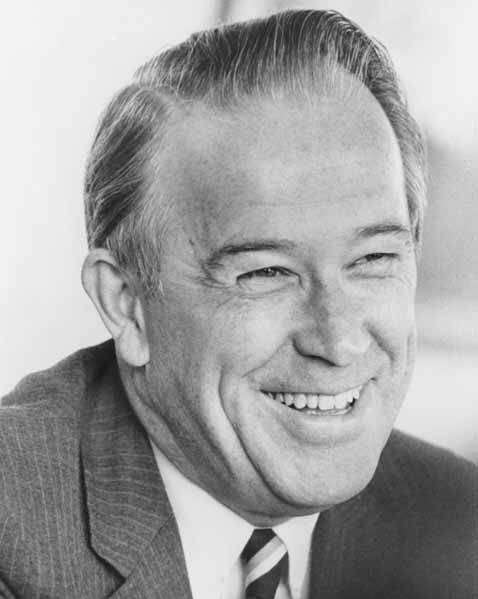
Henry M. Jackson, United States senator

- Brock Adams (1949) – U.S. senator (1987–1993); U.S. representative (1965–1977), for the state of Washington
- Fouad Ajami (1969, 1973) – director of the Middle East Studies Program at Johns Hopkins University
- Armida Alisjahbana – Minister of Economics and Development of Indonesia (2009–present)
- Mabel Byrd – economist and civil rights activist, first African American to enroll at the University of Oregon
- Morgan Christen (B.A., 1983) – United States federal appellate judge
- Suzan DelBene (MBA 1990) – U.S. representative (2012–present)
- Norman D. Dicks (1963, J.D. 1968) – Democratic member of the U.S. House of Representatives (1977–2013)
- Jennifer Dunn (transferred 1962) – US representative (1993–2005); former chair of the Washington State Republican Party
- Earl D. Eisenhower (1923) – electrical engineer, Illinois House of Representatives (1965–1967)
- Alex Ifeanyichukwu Ekwueme (1955, 1957) – vice president of Nigeria (1979–1983)
- Ayşenur Eygi, (2024) – activist killed in the West Bank
- Daniel J. Evans (B.S. 1948, M.S. 1949) – governor of Washington (1965–1977); United States senator (1983–1989) for the state of Washington
- Tom Foley (1951, J.D. 1957) – U.S. representative (1965–1995); speaker of the House (1989–1995)
- Dionne Foster – member, Seattle City Council
- Booth Gardner (B.A. 1958) – governor (1985–1993) of the state of Washington
- Christine Gregoire (B.A. 1969, 1971) – governor (2004–2012); former attorney general of the state of Washington
- Michael Hardt (M.A. 1986, Ph.D. 1990) – literary theorist and political philosopher based at Duke University
- Bruce Harrell (B.A. 1980, J.D. 1984) – acting mayor of Seattle in 2017; Seattle mayor 2022–2026
- Susan Hekman (M.A. 1973, Ph.D. 1976) – professor of political science; director of the graduate humanities program at the University of Texas at Arlington
- Jaime Herrera (B.A. 2004) – U.S. representative (2011–2023)
- Gordon Hirabayashi (B.A. 1946, M.A. 1949, Ph.D. 1952) – human rights activist
- Jay Inslee (B.A. 1973) – governor of Washington state
- Henry M. Jackson (J.D. 1935) – U.S. representative (1941–1953); U.S. senator (1953–1983) for the state of Washington; chairman of the Democratic National Committee (1960–1961); member of the Delta Chi Fraternity
- Sally Jewell (1978) – former U.S. secretary of the interior; former CEO of Recreational Equipment Inc. (REI)
- Darryl N. Johnson (B.A., 1960) – former U.S. ambassador to Thailand (2001–2004) and Lithuania (1992–1994)
- T. K. Jones – civil defense expert in the Reagan administration
- John M. Koenig – former U.S. ambassador to Cyprus (2012–2015)
- Tina Kotek (M.A. 1998) – governor of Oregon
- Tom Lantos (B.A. 1949, M.A. 1950) – U.S. representative for California (1981–2008); Holocaust survivor
- Dr Eteni Longondo (MPH, 2005) – Minister of Public Health, Democratic Republic of the Congo
- Wing Luke – Seattle City Council member; Washington state assistant attorney general
- Edwin L. MacLean – Minnesota state legislator
- Warren G. Magnuson (1926, J.D. 1929) – U.S. senator for the state of Washington (1944–1981); member of the Alpha Rho chapter of Theta Chi fraternity
- Clarence D. Martin (1906) – governor of the state of Washington (1933–1940); namesake of Martin Stadium at Washington State University
- Stephen McAlpine (B.A. 1972) – lieutenant governor of Alaska (1982–1990)
- Rob McKenna (B.A. 1985) – Washington attorney general (2004–2012)
- Keith Harvey Miller – governor of Alaska (1969–1970)
- Allan Phillip Mustard (B.A., 1978) – U.S. ambassador to Turkmenistan (2014–2019); chair of the OpenStreetMap Foundation
- Greg Nickels – mayor of the city of Seattle (2002–2010)
- Greg Overstreet (B.A. 1989)– member of the Montana legislature
- Jeannette Rankin – U.S. representative for Montana (1917–1919, 1940–1943); first female member of Congress
- Robin Raphel (B.A., 1969) – former U.S. ambassador to Tunisia (1997–2000), assistant secretary of state for South and Central Asian Affairs (1993–1997)
- Norm Rice (1972, 1974) – former mayor of the city of Seattle
- Cathy McMorris Rodgers (2002) – U.S. representative (2005–2025)
- Albert Rosellini (1932, 1933) – governor of Washington (1957–1965)
- Pat Russell (born 1923) – Los Angeles City Council member, 1969–87
- Rob Saka – member, Seattle City Council
- Adam Smith (JD, 1990) – Democratic US representative from Washington
- Lou Stewart – Washington state labor leader
- Arthur R. Thompson – anticommunist cold warrior and CEO of the right-wing John Birch Society
- Thor C. Tollefson – U.S. representative from Washington
- Johnson Toribiong (J.D. 1972, 1973) – current president, Republic of Palau
- John Urquhart (B.A. 1971) – current King County sheriff
- Lynn Woolsey – Democratic U.S. representative (1993–) from California
- J. Arthur Younger (1915) – Republican US representative from California (1952–1967)
- Paul Zellinsky (1933–2015) – Democrat and Republican member of the Washington House of Representatives

=== Military ===
==== Prominent officers ====
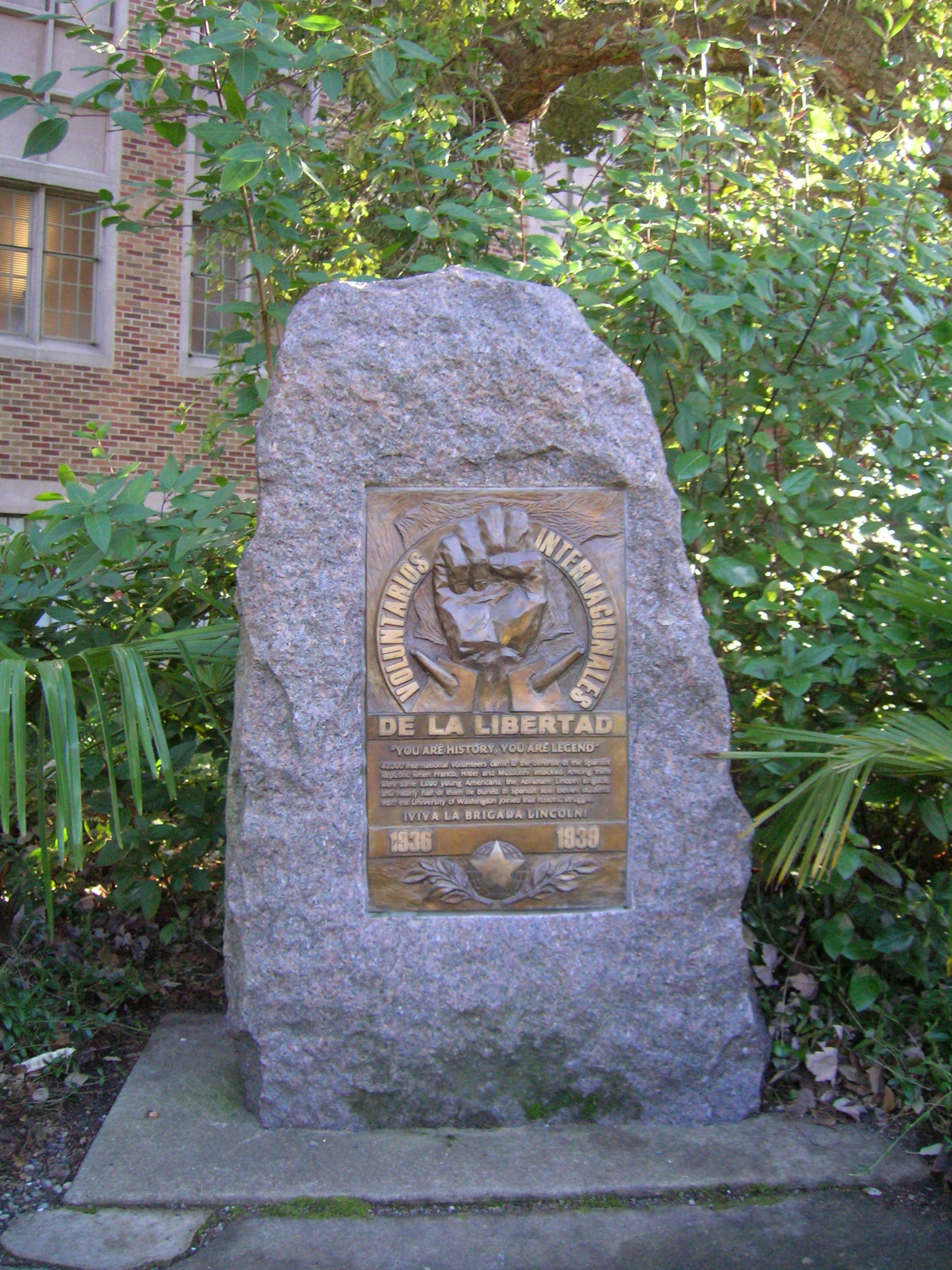
Monument to the Abraham Lincoln Brigade on campus

===== Active duty =====
- Peter W. Chiarelli (1980) – four-star general; vice chief of staff of the United States Army
- Bruce W. Clingan (1977) – admiral, United States Navy, and commander, U.S. Naval Forces Europe commander, U.S. Naval Forces Africa, commander, Allied Joint Force Command, Naples

===== World War II =====
- Leslie Groves – major general, United States Army Corps of Engineers, head of the Manhattan Project
- William H. Holloman III (1924–2010) – U.S. Army Air Force officer and combat fighter pilot with the Tuskegee Airmen; U.S. Air Force's first African American helicopter pilot; University of Washington professor of Black Studies
- Tatsuji Suga – lieutenant colonel, Imperial Japanese Army, commander of all prisoner-of-war (POW) and civilian internment camps in Borneo

===== Other =====
- Frank E. Garretson – brigadier general, U.S. Marine Corps; Navy Cross recipient
- Tracy L. Garrett – major general, first female inspector general of the United States Marine Corps
- Harley D. Nygren (B.S. 1945, BSME 1947) – National Oceanic and Atmospheric Administration (NOAA) rear admiral, first director of the NOAA Commissioned Officer Corps
- Kelly E. Taggart – National Oceanic and Atmospheric Administration (NOAA) rear admiral, second Director of the NOAA Commissioned Officer Corps
- Ronald R. Van Stockum – brigadier general' director, Marine Corps Reserve 1962–1964

==== Medal of Honor recipients ====
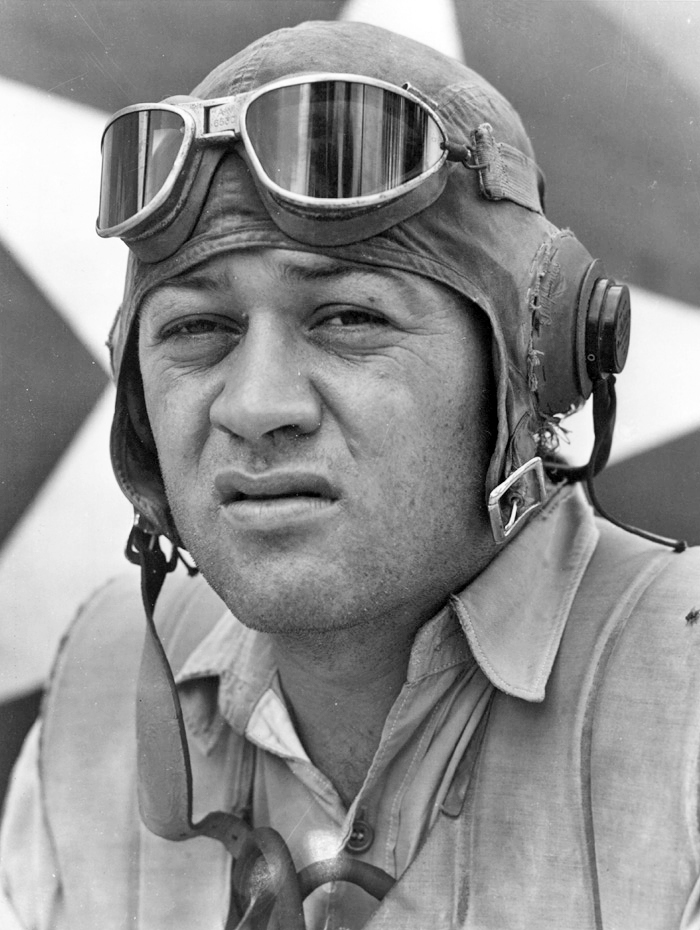
Pappy Boyington, pilot

- Col. (then Maj.) Gregory (Pappy) Boyington (B.S. 1934) – USMC, fighter pilot and World War II ace
- 1LT Deming Bronson, USA (Class of 1914)
- Lieutenant Colonel Bruce P. Crandall (1951–1952) – U.S. Army helicopter pilot in the Vietnam War
- Brig. Gen (then Maj.) Robert Galer (B.S. 1935) – major general, USMC, fighter pilot and World War II ace
- Sgt John D. "Bud" Hawk – USA (1951, 1952)
- 2LT Robert R. Leisy – USA (Class of 1968)
- PFC William K. Nakamura – USA (non-graduate due to internment at Minidoka in 1942)
- Col. (then SSgt.) Archie Van Winkle – USMC (Class of 1961)

=== Religion ===
- Sanford Brown – social justice advocate, ordained United Methodist minister, and executive director of the Church Council of Greater Seattle

=== Science and technology ===
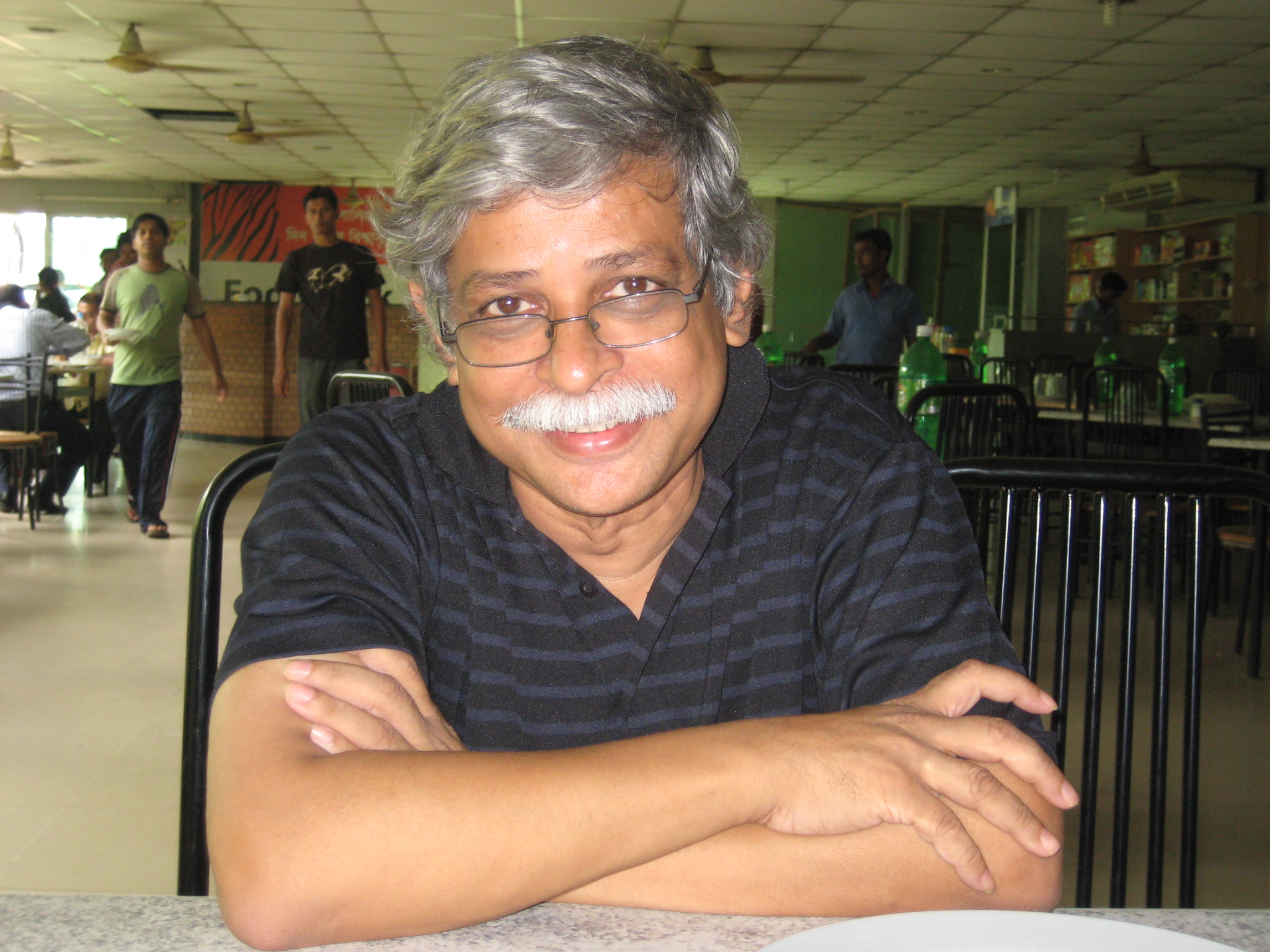
Muhammed Zafar Iqbal, PhD 1982, science-fiction writer and professor of Shahjalal University of Science and Technology

- Margaret Allemang (PhD 1974) – long-standing faculty member at the University of Toronto
- James G. Anderson (1966) – professor of atmospheric chemistry at Harvard University
- Sarah Andrews (Ph.D. 2008) – immunologist
- Tom M. Apostol (1944, 1946) – analytic number theorist and textbook author at the California Institute of Technology
- Mary Argo (died 1984), physicist who worked on the Manhattan Project
- Bill Atkinson – designer of much of the graphic subsystem for the Apple Macintosh and creator of Hypercard and MacPaint
- Eric Temple Bell (1908) – mathematician and author; recipient of the Bôcher Memorial Prize
- Wendy Boss (M.S. 1970) – North Carolina State University
- Derek Blake Booth (Ph.D. 1984) – professor of earth sciences
- James B. Carrell (Ph.D. 1967) – mathematician; recipient of the Steele Prize
- Daryl Chapin (1929) – physicist best known for co-inventing solar cells
- Rita R. Colwell (1961) – director of the United States National Science Foundation
- Jeff Dean (Ph.D. 1996) – Google Senior Fellow; computer scientist and software engineer
- Melvin Defleur – social scientist noted in the area of mass communication
- Patricia Louise Dudley (Ph.D. 1957) – zoologist specializing in copepods
- Ed Felten (M.S. 1991, Ph.D. 1993) – leading computer scientist in the field of security and authentication
- William Foege (1961) – former director of the U.S. Centers for Disease Control
- Mark S. Ghiorso – geochemist noted for modeling magmatic systems
- David Goodstein – physicist and former vice provost of Caltech
- Ashutosh Chilkoti – Alan L. Kaganov Professor of Biomedical Engineering at Duke University
- Lois Wilfred Griffiths (1921, 1923) – mathematician
- Victor Grinich – pioneer in the semiconductor industry; a member of the "traitorous eight" who founded Silicon Valley
- Mohamed Hashish – inventor of the abrasive waterjet cutter; fellow in the department of Mechanical Engineering
- Elizabeth Haswell – biologist, professor and Howard Hughes Medical Institute-Simons Faculty Scholar at the Washington University in St. Louis
- Sharon Hillier (Ph.D.) – microbiologist and medical academic
- Harold Hotelling (B.A. 1919, M.A. 1921) – mathematical statistician; economic theorist
- Jennifer Hunter – mammalogist and Director of the Hastings Natural History Reservation (B.A. 2002)
- William Hutchinson – founder of the Fred Hutchinson Cancer Research Center
- Muhammad Zafar Iqbal (Ph.D. 1982) – former research scientist of Bell Communications Research (Bellcore); professor and the head of the Department of Computer Science and Engineering of Shahjalal University of Science and Technology; educationalist; columnist; sci-fi writer
- Erik M. Jorgensen – geneticist and Howard Hughes Medical Institute Investigator at the University of Utah noted for finding more than 30 genes involved in synaptic function in C. elegans
- Irving Kanarek – aerospace engineer; legal defendant for Charles Manson
- Lena Kenin (B.S. 1921) – OB/GYN and psychiatrist
- Gary Kildall – inventor of the CP/M operating system
- Shoshichi Kobayashi (1956) – former chairman of the Berkeley Mathematics Department; recipient of the Geometry prize
- Tessa Lau (PhD, 2001) – computer scientist, roboticist, and entrepreneur
- William Ka Ming Lau – senior scientist at the University of Maryland, former deputy director for Science, NASA Goddard Space Flight Center Earth Science Division, discovered the aerosol-monsoon regional feedback mechanism, i.e. the Elevated Heat Pump (EHP) effect
- Ratul Mahajan – computer systems researcher
- Zelma Maine-Jackson – hydrogeologist
- Victor Mills (1926) – inventor of disposable diapers
- Virginia Minnich (1938–1984) – professor of medicine; discovered hemoglobin E and elucidated the glutathione synthesis pathway
- Horace Yomishi Mochizuki (Ph.D. 1963) – mathematician specializing in group theory
- Alfred M. Moen – inventor of the single-handed mixing faucet; founder of Moen Incorporated
- PZ Myers (B.S. 1979) – biologist and science blogger
- Lina Nilsson (M.S.) – biomedical engineer and Tekla Labs co-founder, MIT Technology Review "35 Under 35"
- Harley D. Nygren (B.S. 1945, BSME 1947) – engineer and National Oceanic and Atmospheric Administration (NOAA) rear admiral, first director of the NOAA Commissioned Officer Corps
- Tim Paterson (1978) – original author of the MS-DOS operating system
- Robin Reid – environmentalist scientist and professor at Colorado State University
- Gertrude F. Rempfer (1934, BA; 1939, PhD) – physicist and innovator in electron microscopy
- Howard P. Robertson (1922, 1923) – cosmologist
- Robert G. Roeder (1969) – Arnold and Mabel Beckman Professor at The Rockefeller University; recipient of the Albert Lasker Award for Basic Medical Research in 2003 for "pioneering studies on eukaryotic RNA polymerases and the general transcriptional machinery, which opened gene expression in animal cells to biochemical analysis"
- Michael Schick- physicist
- Waldo Semon – inventor of vinyl and synthetic rubber
- Bell M. Shimada (B.S. 1947, M.S. 1948, Ph.D. 1956) – fisheries scientist
- Waldo R. Tobler – American-Swiss geographer and cartographer
- Ruth Todd – geologist
- Bud Tribble – vice president and director of software technology at Apple Computer; a founder of NeXT computer
- Cornelia Ulrich – executive director of the Comprehensive Cancer Center at Huntsman Cancer Institute, University of Utah School of Medicine
- Elizabeth Van Volkenburgh – plant sciences professor
- Bob Wallace – inventor of the term "shareware;" creator of the word processing program PC-Write; founder of the software company Quicksoft
- Esther Wilkins – dental pioneer, founder of UW's Dental Hygiene Program and author of Clinical Practice of the Dental Hygienist, the first comprehensive text on dental hygiene
- Ted Woolsey – video game translator for Square during the SNES era

=== Social science and humanities ===
- Mable E. Buland Campbell (B.A., 1904 and M.A., 1908) – professor of English at University of Puget Sound
- Robert A. Dahl (B.A., 1936) – longtime professor of political science at Yale University
- Ukshin Hoti – professor of international law and philosophy at the University of Pristina
- Dale Kinkade (1955, 1957) – linguist, specialist on Salishan languages
- Antxon Olarrea – professor of linguistics at the University of Arizona
- Deborah Parker (B.A., 1999) – American Ethnic Studies and sociology, former trustee of the University of Washington's Friends of the Educational Opportunity Program board
- Irene Reed (degree in 1961) – anthropologist and linguist, specialist on the Yupik languages
- Kent R. Weeks (1963, 1966) – Egyptologist

=== Sports ===
==== Olympic medal winners ====
- Gold medal, men's rowing, 1936 Berlin Olympic Games
  - Gordon Adam
  - Charles Day
  - Don Hume
  - George Hunt
  - Jim McMillin
  - Robert Moch (cox)
  - H. Roger Morris
  - Joe Rantz
  - John White
- Gold medal, men's rowing, 1948 London Olympic Games
  - Gordy Giovanelli
  - Bob Martin
  - Allen Morgan
  - Warren Westlund
  - Bob Will
- David Calder (silver medal, rowing, Canada, 2008 Beijing Olympic Games)
- Will Crothers (silver medal, rowing, Canada, 2012 London Olympic Games)
- Anna Cummins (gold medal, rowing, 2008 Beijing, silver medal, 2004 Athens Olympic Games)
- Rob Gibson (silver medal, rowing, Canada, 2012 London Olympic Games)
- Pan Cheng-tsung (bronze medal, golf, 2020 Tokyo Olympic Games)
- Adrienne Martelli (bronze medal, rowing, 2012 London Olympic Games)
- Conlin McCabe (silver medal, rowing, Canada, 2012 London Olympic Games)
- Rielly Milne (men’s rowing coxswain; bronze medal, 2024 Paris Summer Olympics)
- Hope Solo (women's soccer; gold medals, 2008 Beijing and 2012 London)
- Mary Whipple (gold medal, rowing, 2012 London, 2008 Beijing; silver medal, 2004 Athens Olympic Games)

==== Baseball ====
- Mike Blowers – former Major League Baseball player
- Fred Hutchinson – baseball player and manager and namesake of the Fred Hutchinson Cancer Research Center
- Jake Lamb – third baseman for Arizona Diamondbacks, 2017 All-Star
- Brent Lillibridge – MLB infielder for Chicago Cubs
- Tim Lincecum – 2008, 2009 and 2010 All-Star and two-time NL Cy Young Award recipient
- Kevin Stocker – shortstop for Phillies, D-Rays and Angels, 1993–2000
- Sammy White – former MLB catcher, 1953 All-Star
- Sean White – 2007, 2009, 2010 MLB pitcher for Seattle Mariners

==== Basketball ====
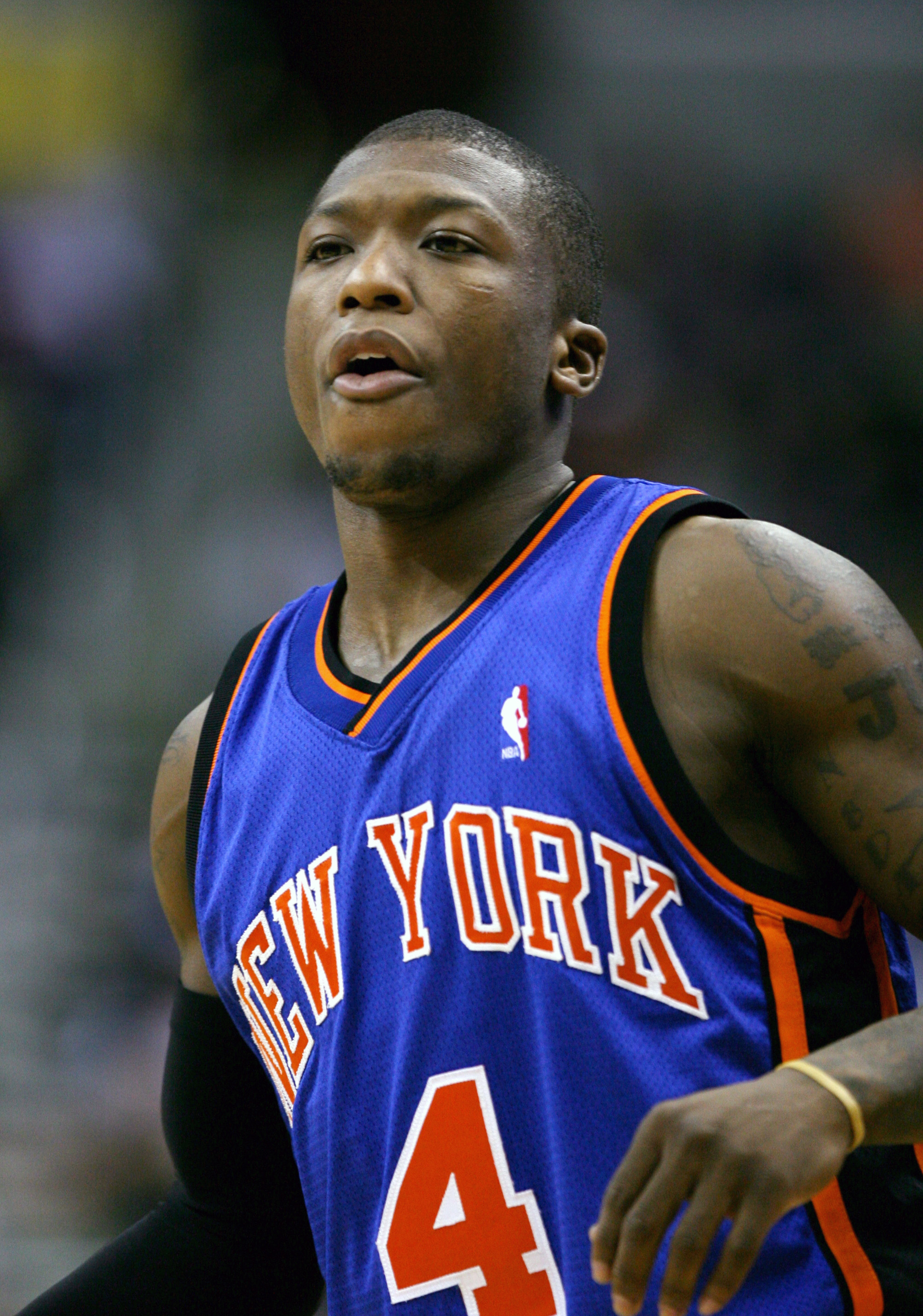
Nate Robinson

- Jon Brockman – drafted in the second round of the 2009 NBA draft by the Sacramento Kings
- Marquese Chriss – former NBA player for the Phoenix Suns
- Justin Dentmon – professional basketball player, 2010 top scorer in the Israel Basketball Premier League
- Dan Dickau – attended 1997–1999; transferred to Gonzaga in 2000; drafted 1st round, 28th overall by the Sacramento Kings in 2002 NBA Draft; played professionally 2002–2010
- James Edwards – former NBA player
- Markelle Fultz – #1 pick in the 2017 NBA draft, NBA player for the Orlando Magic
- Abdul Gaddy (born 1992) – player in the Israeli Basketball Premier League
- Spencer Hawes – drafted in the first round of the 2007 NBA draft by the Sacramento Kings, currently plays for the South Bay Lakers
- Steve Hawes – attended 1969–1972; drafted 2nd round, 24th overall by the Cleveland Cavaliers in 1972 NBA Draft; played professionally 1972–1985
- Justin Holiday – undrafted in 2011; currently plays for the New York Knicks
- Bob Houbregs (1959) – first Washington alumnus in the Naismith Memorial Basketball Hall of Fame; third overall pick in the 1953 NBA draft; member of Univ. of Washington 1953 final four team
- Todd MacCulloch – former NBA player for the Philadelphia 76ers and New Jersey Nets
- Dejounte Murray – NBA player for the San Antonio Spurs
- Louie Nelson – former NBA player
- Jack Nichols – 1948 All-American and former NBA player
- Kelsey Plum – guard who completed her Washington women's career in 2017; all-time leading point scorer in NCAA Division I women's basketball, and selected#1 in the 2017 WNBA draft by the San Antonio Stars
- Quincy Pondexter – drafted 26th overall in the 2010 NBA draft; currently plays for the San Antonio Spurs
- Eldridge Recasner – NBA three-time All-Pac-10 Conference guard, and former Continental and NBA player
- Nate Robinson – NBA guard picked 21st overall of 2005 NBA draft by the New York Knicks; winner of 2006, 2009, and 2010 NBA All-Star Slam Dunk Competitions
- Lorenzo Romar – former head coach of the University of Washington basketball team
- Terrence Ross – drafted 8th overall in the 2012 NBA draft by the Toronto Raptors; currently plays for the Orlando Magic
- Brandon Roy – second-highest NBA-drafted Washington basketball player in school history (6th in the 2006 NBA draft) and the 2006–07 NBA Rookie of the Year; currently a basketball coach for Garfield High School
- Mark Sanford – first underclassman to enter the NBA draft from the University of Washington; second round pick of the Miami Heat of the 1997 NBA draft
- Detlef Schrempf – German-born former NBA star
- Tre Simmons – basketball player
- Isaiah Thomas – drafted in the 2011 NBA draft by the Sacramento Kings; currently plays for the Washington Wizards; two-time NBA All-Star
- Rod Thorn – former NBA player, former president and general manager of the NBA's New Jersey Nets, and 2018 inductee at the Naismith Memorial Basketball Hall of Fame
- Christian Welp – attended 1983–1987; drafted 1st round, 16th overall by the Philadelphia 76ers in 1987 NBA Draft; played professionally 1987–1999
- Tony Wroten Jr. – drafted 25th overall in the 2012 NBA draft by the Memphis Grizzlies
- Phil Zevenbergen – attended 1985–1987; drafted 3rd round, 50th overall by the San Antonio Spurs in 1987 NBA draft; played professionally 1987–1999

==== Football ====
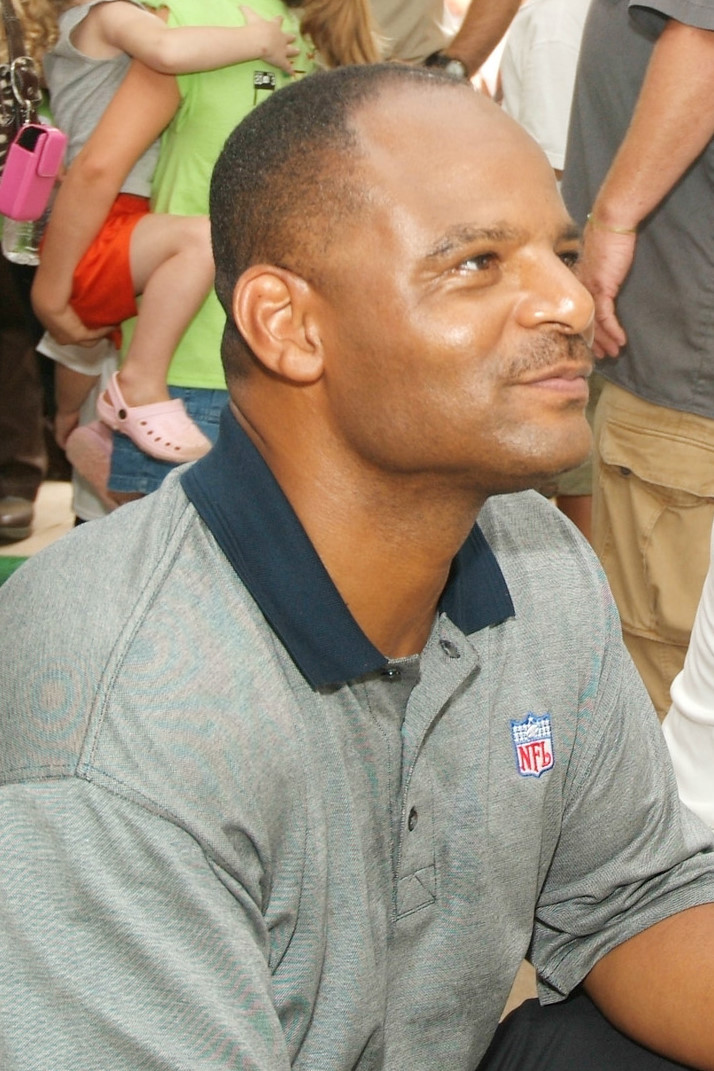
Warren Moon, Hall of Fame NFL Quarterback

- Victor Aiyewa – NFL linebacker for the Green Bay Packers
- Vince Albritton – former NFL safety for the Dallas Cowboys
- Khalif Barnes – NFL offensive tackle for the Oakland Raiders
- Eric Bjornson – former NFL tight end for the Dallas Cowboys
- Bern Brostek – NFL offensive lineman for the Los Angeles Rams
- Dennis Brown – former defensive end for the San Francisco 49ers of the NFL; played in and won Super Bowl XXIX
- Mark Bruener – NFL tight end for the Houston Texans
- Mark Brunell (1993) – NFL quarterback for the Washington Redskins
- Donald Butler – NFL linebacker for the San Diego Chargers
- Chuck Carroll – elected to the College Football Hall of Fame and National Football Foundation Hall of Fame
- Chris Chandler – former NFL quarterback
- Ernie Conwell – NFL tight end for the New Orleans Saints
- Marquis Cooper – NFL linebacker for the Tampa Bay Buccaneers
- Don Coryell (1950, 1951) – former NFL head coach for the San Diego Chargers and introduced the I formation to the NFL
- Darrell Daniels – NFL tight end for the Indianapolis Colts
- Stanley Daniels – NFL offensive lineman for the Denver Broncos
- Corey Dillon – NFL running back for the Cincinnati Bengals and New England Patriots
- Steve Emtman – former NFL defensive lineman and the first pick in the 1992 NFL draft
- D'Marco Farr – former NFL defensive lineman and current television personality
- George Fleming – former NFL placekicker for the Oakland Raiders, first African-American to be elected to the Washington State Senate
- Lee Folkins – former Pro Bowl NFL tight end for the Green Bay Packers and Dallas Cowboys
- Mason Foster – NFL linebacker for the Tampa Bay Buccaneers
- Ray Frankowski – former NFL guard for the Green Bay Packers
- Nesby Glasgow – former safety who played 14 seasons in the National Football League
- Kevin Gogan – former NFL offensive lineman for the Dallas Cowboys and the Oakland Raiders
- Dashon Goldson – NFL Pro-Bowl safety for the San Francisco 49ers
- Don Heinrich – former NFL quarterback for the New York Giants
- Billy Joe Hobert – NFL quarterback
- Dave Hoffmann – NFL linebacker for the Pittsburgh Steelers
- Brock Huard – former NFL quarterback for the Seattle Seahawks
- Damon Huard – NFL quarterback for the Kansas City Chiefs
- Jeff Jaeger – former NFL Pro Bowl placekicker
- Ernie Janet – former NFL guard
- Derrick Johnson – NFL cornerback
- Tank Johnson – NFL defensive lineman for the Cincinnati Bengals
- Jim Jones – football player
- Napoleon Kaufman – former NFL running back for the Oakland Raiders
- Jermaine Kearse – NFL wide receiver for the Seattle Seahawks
- Senio Kelemete – NFL offensive lineman for the Arizona Cardinals
- Lincoln Kennedy – former NFL offensive lineman and three time Pro Bowl participant
- David Kopay (1964) – former NFL running back
- Olin Kreutz – former NFL Pro Bowl center for the Chicago Bears
- Jake Kupp – former NFL Pro Bowl offensive guard for the Dallas Cowboys and New Orleans Saints
- Greg Lewis – NFL running back for the Denver Broncos
- Jake Locker – NFL quarterback for the Tennessee Titans
- Hugh McElhenny (1952) – former NFL running back and member of both the College and Pro Football Hall of Fame
- Jalen McMillan – NFL wide receiver for the Tampa Bay Buccaneers
- Siupeli Malamala – former NFL offensive tackle and offensive guard for the New York Jets
- Lawyer Milloy – NFL safety for the Seattle Seahawks
- Warren Moon (1978) – former National Football League quarterback and member of the Pro Football Hall of Fame
- Jim L. Mora – former head coach of the Seattle Seahawks
- Jim Norton – former NFL lineman
- Rome Odunze – NFL wide receiver for the Chicago Bears
- Benji Olson – NFL offensive lineman for the Tennessee Titans
- Tony Parrish – NFL safety for the San Francisco 49ers
- Jerome Pathon – NFL wide receiver for the Atlanta Falcons
- Dave Pear – former Pro Bowl NFL defensive lineman for the Tampa Bay Buccaneers and Oakland Raiders
- Steve Pelluer – former NFL quarterback for the Dallas Cowboys
- Dante Pettis – NFL wide receiver for the San Francisco 49ers
- Michael Penix Jr – NFL quarterback for the Atlanta Falcons
- Cody Pickett – NFL quarterback for the San Francisco 49ers
- Chris Polk – NFL running back for the Philadelphia Eagles
- Ja'Lynn Polk – NFL wide receiver for the New England Patriots
- Fred Provo – former NFL halfback
- Marcel Reece – NFL fullback for the Oakland Raiders
- Matthew Rogers – offensive lineman for the 2001 Washington Rose Bowl team and American Idol finalist
- Danny Shelton – NFL nose tackle for the Cleveland Browns
- Sonny Sixkiller (1971) – former NFL and CFL quarterback; cast member in the original The Longest Yard
- William Arley Smith – former All Pro NFL wide receiver for the Chicago Cardinals
- Isaiah Stanback – former NFL wide receiver and kick returner for the Dallas Cowboys
- Jerramy Stevens – NFL tight end for the Tampa Bay Buccaneers
- Alameda Ta'amu – NFL defensive lineman for the Pittsburgh Steelers
- Daniel Te'o-Nesheim – NFL defensive end for the Tampa Bay Buccaneers
- Joe Toledo – NFL offensive lineman for the Miami Dolphins
- Marques Tuiasosopo – NFL quarterback for the New York Jets; assistant coach for UW
- CJ Wallace – former NFL defensive back for the Seattle Seahawks
- Lester Towns – former NFL linebacker for the Carolina Panthers
- Arnie Weinmeister – former NFL lineman; member of the Pro Football Hall of Fame; Teamster boss
- Reggie Williams – NFL wide receiver for the Jacksonville Jaguars
- Al Worley – 1968 Consensus All-American defensive back, set still-standing NCAA record for interceptions in a season (14)

==== Soccer ====
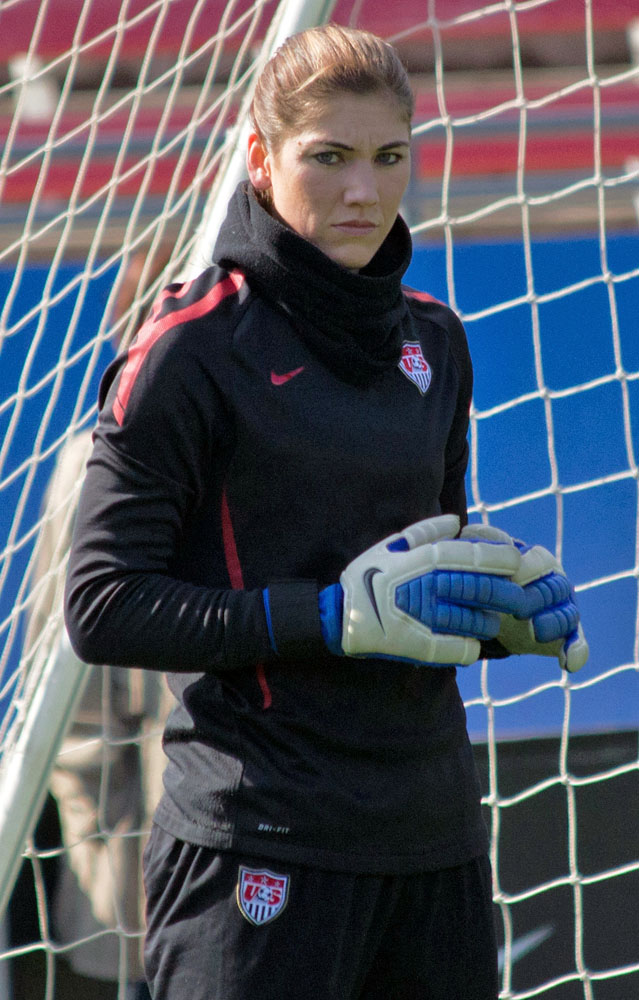
Hope Solo

- Kate Deines – professional soccer player for the Atlanta Beat and Seattle Reign FC
- Lindsay Elston – professional soccer player for Houston Dash and Seattle Reign FC
- Joe Franchino (1997) – former Major League Soccer and U.S. international player
- George John – defensive player for the MLS team FC Dallas
- Ellis McLoughlin – played in Bundesliga and MLS
- Veronica Perez – professional soccer player for Washington Spirit and the Mexico National Team
- Brandon Prideaux – former Major League Soccer player; two-time MLS Cup champion
- Cristian Roldan – professional soccer player for the Seattle Sounders FC and United States men's national soccer team
- Hope Solo – former goalkeeper for US Women's National Team
- Craig Waibel – four-time Major League Soccer champion; defender for Houston Dynamo

==== Track and field ====
- Don Kardong (1974) – fourth-place finisher at the 1976 Olympic marathon and former president of the Road Runners Club of America
- Brad Walker (2003) – two-time NCAA pole vault champion; gold medalist at the 2006 World Indoor Championships and 2007 World Championships

==== Other sports ====
- Fred Beckey (1949) – mountaineer
- Venise Chan (born 1989) – tennis player
- Louise Friberg (2003) – golfer
- Pan Cheng-tsung (2015) – golfer
- William Quillian – tennis player
- Annabel Ritchie (born 1978) – rower
- Summer Ross (attended freshman year) – volleyball; 2010 FIVB Youth Under-19 and Junior Under-21 world champion
- Bob Sapp – kickboxer; MMA fighter; former NFL lineman
- Ed Viesturs (BS 1981) – first American to summit all 14 of the world's 8000 meter peaks
- Kenji Yamada – two-time U.S. National judo champion

=== Music ===
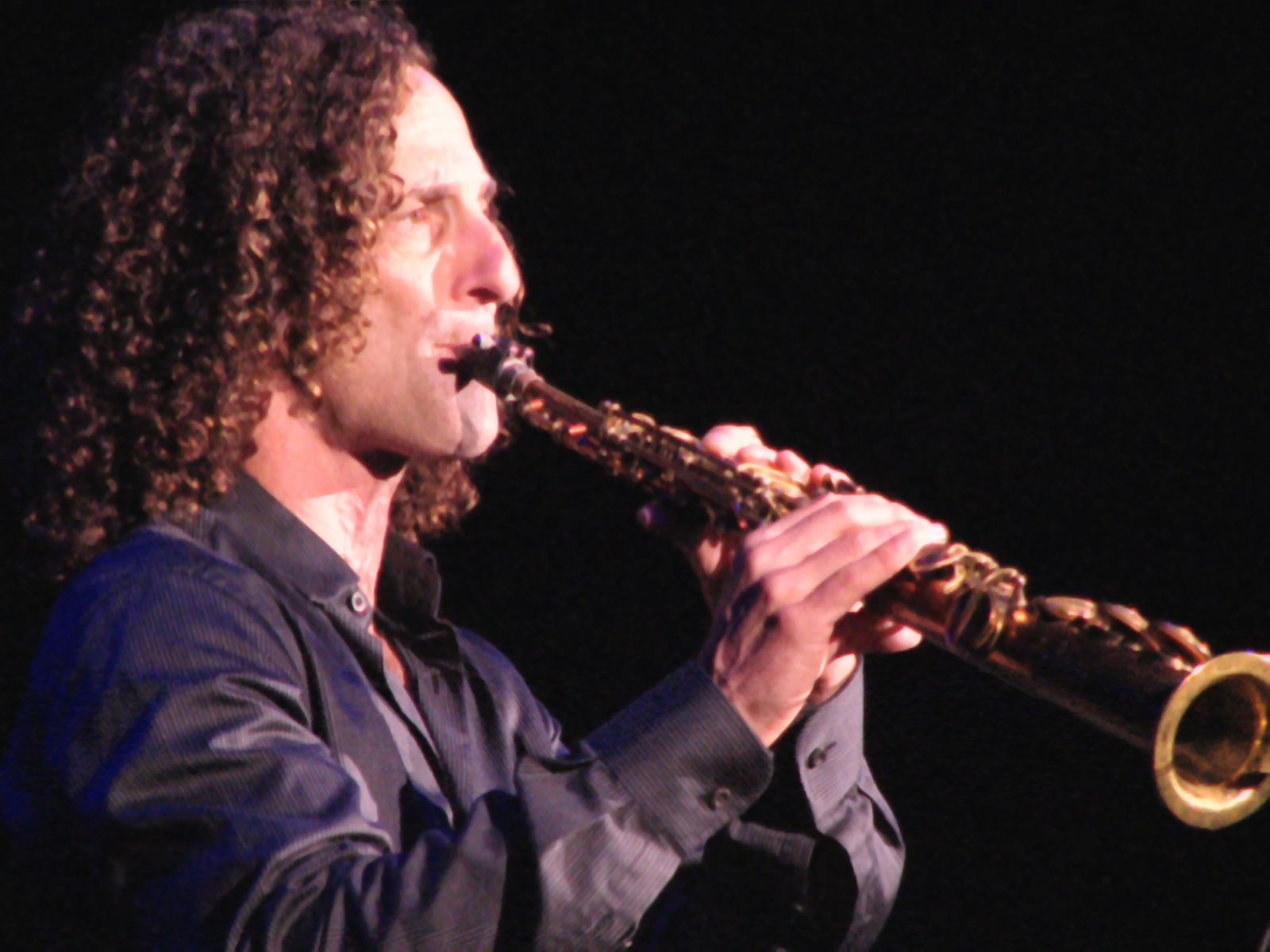
Kenny G

- Mark Arm (1985) – lead vocalist for the grunge rock group Mudhoney
- Anomie Belle – vocalist, multi-instrumentalist, producer and electronic musician
- William Bolcom – pianist and composer of cabaret songs, concertos, sonatas, operas, symphonies; awarded the 1988 Pulitzer Prize in Music for his "Twelve New Etudes" for piano
- The Brothers Four – musical group from the 1960s
- Jack Endino (1980) – producer, musician, engineer, "godfather of grunge"
- Gary Peacock (1976) – jazz double bassist
- Peter Hallock – organist, choirmaster, liturgist
- Malcolm Hamilton – harpsichordist
- Kenny G (1978) – smooth jazz saxophonist
- Elmer Gill – jazz pianist and vibraphonist
- Ryan Lewis (2009) – DJ, producer, composer, photographer, music video director, business partner of Seattle musician Ben Haggerty (aka Macklemore)
- Jake One – hip hop music producer
- The Presidents of the United States of America – alternative rock group
- John Roderick – lead singer of The Long Winters
- Susan Silver – music manager
- Richard Sparks – choral conductor
- Ken Stringfellow – main composer, vocalist and guitarist for rock group The Posies
- Kim Thayil (1985) – lead guitarist for rock group Soundgarden
- Alex Veley (1995) – soul keyboardist and singer
- Kathleen Wakefield – songwriter, singer and author
- Martin Welzel – organist

=== Television, film, and other arts ===
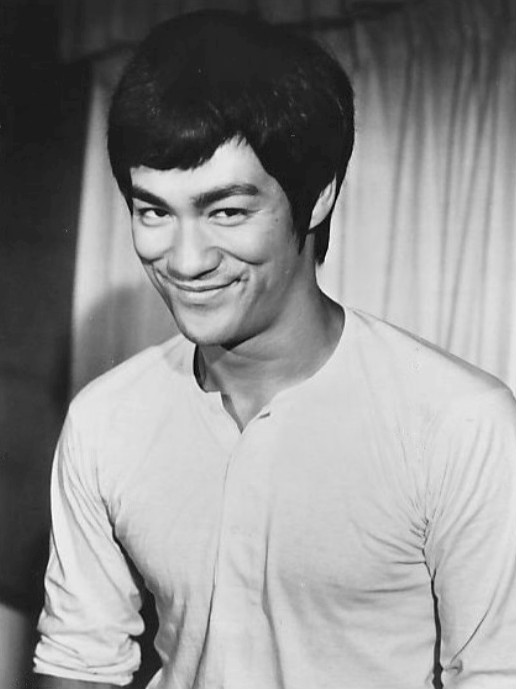
Bruce Lee

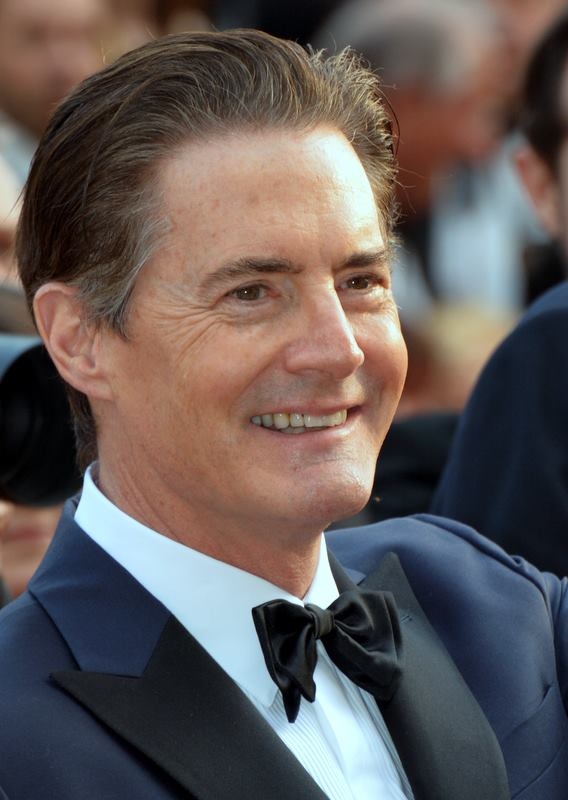
Kyle MacLachlan

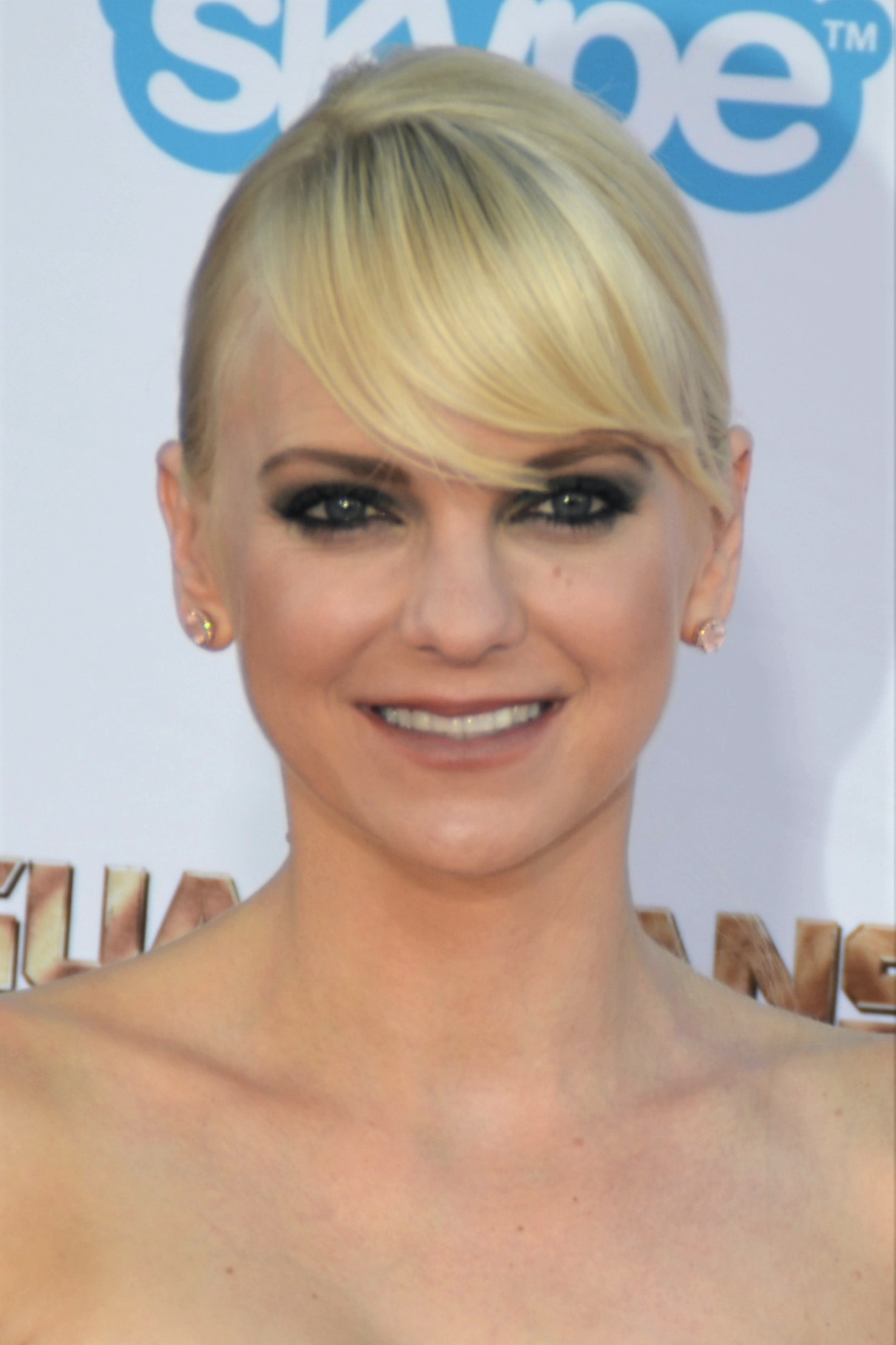
Anna Faris

- Robert Armstrong – movie actor who portrayed Carl Denham in the 1933 version of King Kong
- John Aylward – stage, TV, and movie actor, ER, The West Wing
- Stan Boreson – comedian and singer, the "King of Scandinavian Humor"
- Angus Bowmer – founder of the Oregon Shakespeare Festival in Ashland, Oregon
- David Brooks – Broadway star and stage director and producer
- Dylan Bruce – Canadian actor and model, known for his roles on As the World Turns and Orphan Black
- Luke Burbank (1988) – radio host and reporter
- Dyan Cannon – film and television actress and twice nominee for the Academy Award for Best Supporting Actress
- Loren Carpenter (1976) – co-founded Pixar Animation Studios; currently chief creative officer of Disney
- James Caviezel – actor, played Jesus Christ in the controversial film The Passion of the Christ, plays one of the leads in the TV series Person of Interest
- Lee Shallat Chemel – TV director, Murphy Brown
- Queenie Chu – actress, first runner-up of Miss Hong Kong Pageant 2004
- Tristram Coffin – actor who played Thomas H. Rynning, commander of the Arizona Rangers, in the syndicated television series 26 Men (1957–1959)
- Earl Cole – first African-American male winner of Survivor
- Jeffrey Combs – horror film actor and Star Trek regular
- Larry Coryell – jazz guitarist
- Imogen Cunningham (1907) – photographer
- Garret Dillahunt – actor, Raising Hope
- Patrick Duffy (1971) – TV actor, Dallas, Step by Step
- Anna Faris (1999) – film actress, Scary Movie, House Bunny
- Frances Farmer (1935) – film and theatre actress
- The Fung Brothers (Andrew Fung, 1988, and David Fung, 1988) – YouTube personalities, rappers, television actors in Broke Bites: What The Fung?!
- Leann Hunley – actress, Days of Our Lives, Dynasty, Dawson's Creek
- Ken Jennings – holds the record for the longest winning streak on Jeopardy!
- Richard Karn (1979) – television actor; Al Borland in Home Improvement
- Bruce Lee – martial artist and actor
- Kyle MacLachlan (1982) – film and television actor most famous for roles in Twin Peaks, Desperate Housewives, Dune, and Sex and the City
- Mary Mapes – former producer of the CBS television show 60 Minutes
- Ernest Martin (1932) – theatre director and manager
- Joel McHale (1995, MFA 2000) – host of The Soup on E!; actor on NBC comedy Community
- Dallas McKennon – actor
- Dustin Nickerson – stand-up comedian
- Dennis Nyback (2008) – independent film archivist, found footage filmmaker
- Robert Osborne (1954) – film historian
- Steve Pool (1978) – weather presenter and journalist of KOMO-TV
- Dorothy Provine – actress with leading roles in The Bonnie Parker Story, It's a Mad, Mad, Mad, Mad World, Good Neighbor Sam and the TV series The Alaskans
- Pamela Reed – actress
- Kelsey Schmidt (1989) – Miss Washington USA 2016
- Jean Smart (1974) – television actress, Designing Women, Kim Possible
- Manick Sorcar – artist, engineer, and entrepreneur
- Rick Steves (1978) – host, writer and producer of public television's Rick Steve's Europe; best-selling travel author
- Julia Sweeney (1982) – Saturday Night Live actress
- George Tsutakawa (1937, MFA 1950) – painter and sculptor, faculty member of the University of Washington, recipient of Washington's Alumnus Summa Laude Dignatus Award in 1984
- Robb Weller (1961) – Entertainment Tonight host and inventor of the wave
- Dawn Wells (1960) – Mary Ann of Gilligan's Island
- Steve Wiebe (1991) – primary subject of the documentary The King of Kong: A Fistful of Quarters and former world record holder for Donkey Kong
- Rainn Wilson – actor, The Office, Six Feet Under
- Art Wolfe (1975) – nature photographer and star of PBS show Travels to the Edge with Art Wolfe

=== Crime ===
- Ted Bundy – serial killer, 1974–1978; admitted to killing 30 people; some sources say he could have killed as many as 100
- Amanda Knox; convicted of the murder of her roommate in Italy, conviction later overturned

== Notable faculty ==
=== Nobel laureates ===
- David Baker – Chemistry, 2024
- Linda B. Buck – Physiology and Medicine, 2004; also alumna 1975
- Hans G. Dehmelt – Physics, 1989
- Edmond H. Fischer – Physiology and Medicine, 1992
- Leland H. Hartwell – Physiology and Medicine, 2001
- Edwin G. Krebs – Physiology and Medicine, 1992
- Douglass C. North – Bank of Sweden Prize in Economic Sciences in Memory of Alfred Nobel, 1993
- William F. Sharpe – Bank of Sweden Prize in Economic Sciences in Memory of Alfred Nobel, 1990
- E. Donnall Thomas – Physiology and Medicine, 1990
- David Thouless – Physics, 2016; also awarded the 1990 Wolf Prize in Physics

=== Pulitzer Prize winners ===
- Elizabeth Bishop – Poetry, 1956
- Stephen Dunn – Poetry, 2001
- Richard Eberhart – Poetry, 1966
- Vernon Louis Parrington – History, 1928
- Theodore Roethke – Poetry, 1954

=== Biology and medicine ===
- John D Aitchison – molecular cell biologist
- Margaret Allen – former professor of Cardiothoracic Surgery
- William H. Calvin – popularizer of neuroscience and evolutionary biology, including the hybrid of these two fields, neural Darwinism
- Adam Geballe – professor of Medicine; expert on host-virus interactions
- John Gottman – National Institute of Mental Health Research Scientist Award winner
- Harriet Hall – retired family physician, former U.S. Air Force flight surgeon and skeptic who writes about alternative medicine for Skeptic and the Skeptical Inquirer; on the board and a founding member of the Institute for Science in Medicine; Fellow of the Committee for Skeptical Inquiry
- Ray Hilborn – marine biologist and fisheries scientist; expert on fisheries and natural resource management
- Bertil Hille – professor of Physiology and Biophysics; expert on ion channels; co-recipient of the Albert Lasker Award for Basic Medical Research in 1999
- Leroy Hood – biologist; recipient of the Lemelson-MIT Prize for inventing "four instruments that have unlocked much of the mystery of human biology"
- Michael Katze – microbiologist and expert in the study of infectious diseases
- Branko Kopjar – former director of the UW Executive Master of Public Health Program; Distinguished Professor at Chongqing Medical University
- Barry Kerzin – former assistant professor of Medicine (1985–89); honorary professor at Hong Kong University; Buddhist monk and teacher; personal physician to the Dalai Lama
- Chet Moritz – associate professor of neuroscience
- Oliver Press – cancer researcher and physician
- Russell Ross – professor of pathology, known for research on the pathogenesis of atherosclerosis
- Belding H. Scribner – inventor of the Scribner shunt, which enabled long-term kidney dialysis
- Gail G. Shapiro – former clinical professor of Pediatrics

=== Business and law ===
- William R. Greiner – president of the University at Buffalo, 1991–2004
- Paul Heyne – economist and author of The Economic Way of Thinking
- Terence Mitchell – Gold member of Academy of Management Hall of Fame; one of three Gold members out of over 10,000 members
- Fredrick Muyia Nafukho – Presidential Term Professor at the University of Washington

=== Politics and administration ===
- George Sumner Bridges – president of Evergreen State College
- David de Kretser – governor of Victoria, Australia, 2006–2011
- Denice Denton – dean of the University of Washington College of Engineering, 1996–2005; first woman in the United States to lead an engineering college of a major research university
- William Gerberding – president of the University of Washington, 1979–1995
- Margaret Levi – 2005 president of the American Political Science Association
- Charles Odegaard – president of the University of Washington, 1958–1973
- Dixy Lee Ray – seventeenth governor of the state of Washington, the first woman to hold that position
- Paul Schell – former mayor of Seattle; former dean of the University of Washington School of Architecture and Urban Planning, 1992–1995
- Henry Suzzallo – Croatian-American and president of the University of Washington, 1915–1926

=== Science and technology ===
- Eric G. Adelberger – experimental nuclear physicist and gravitational metrologist; recipient of the 2021 Breakthrough Prize in Life Sciences
- David Baker – biochemist and computational biologist; developed the Rosetta algorithm for protein structure prediction; recipient of the 2021 Breakthrough Prize in Fundamental Physics and 2024 Nobel Prize in Chemistry
- Eric Temple Bell – mathematician and author; recipient of the Bôcher Memorial Prize
- Carl Bergstrom – theoretical biologist, created the Eigenfactor ranking for scientific journals
- Gaetano Borriello – computer scientist and pioneer in ubiquitous computing, creator of Open Data Kit
- Donald E. Brownlee – principal investigator of the Stardust comet spacecraft; cited in Discover magazine's 100 most important discoveries in 2004
- Mark Crispin – inventor of the Internet Message Access Protocol
- Vitaly Efimov – proposed a new and exotic state of matter known as the Efimov State
- Oren Etzioni – Washington Research Foundation Entrepreneurship Professor in the Department of Computer Science and Engineering
- Jens H. Gundlach – physicist, recipient of the 2021 Breakthrough Prize in Fundamental Physics
- Blayne Heckel – experimental physicist, recipient of the 2021 Breakthrough Prize in Fundamental Physics
- Thomas W. Hungerford – mathematician and author of many textbooks, including Abstract Algebra: An Introduction
- Victor Klee – mathematician who specialized in convex sets, functional analysis, analysis of algorithms, optimization, and combinatorics; president of the Mathematical Association of America, 1971–1973; a University of Washington faculty member for 54 years
- Neal Koblitz – mathematician; creator of hyperelliptic curve cryptography; independent co-creator of elliptic curve cryptography
- Gerald Folland - mathematician; harmonic analysis on Euclidian space and Lie groups, known for his real analysis textbooks
- Richard E. Ladner – computer scientist; known for his numerous significant contributions to theoretical computer science
- Edward D. Lazowska – Bill and Melinda Gates Chair in Computer Science & Engineering
- Isaac Namioka – mathematician who worked in general topology and functional analysis
- Seth Neddermeyer – physicist; co-discoverer of the muon; Manhattan Project scientist; recipient of the Enrico Fermi Award
- Jerre Noe – first chair of Computer Science Group (now the Computer Science and Engineering Department); directed the Eden Project, the first award in the National Science Foundation's Coordinated Experimental Research Program
- Robert O'Malley – mathematician and president of the Society For Industrial and Applied Mathematics in 1991 and 1992
- Irene C. Peden – first American female engineer or scientist to conduct research in the Antarctic
- Mamidala Ramulu – scholar and mentor of the College of Engineering
- William A. Stein – creator of SageMath; modular forms researcher
- Gunther Uhlmann – mathematician and recipient of the Bôcher Memorial Prize
- Daniel S. Weld – professor of Computer Science and Engineering
- Jessica Werk – assistant professor of Astronomy

=== Social science, arts, and humanities ===
- James A. Banks – scholar; the "father of multicultural education"
- David P. Barash – professor of Psychology
- Laurence BonJour – professor of Philosophy
- Ruthanna Boris – Dance: Ballet
- Michael Brame – professor of Linguistics
- Jon Bridgman – American historian
- Shawn Brixey – digital art, telematics, physics, bioart
- Patricia Shehan Campbell – professor of Music Education and Ethnomusicology
- Susan Casteras – professor of Art History
- Francis D.K. Ching – author of books on architectural graphics
- Sidney S. Culbert – psychologist and Esperantist; major influence in the design of cockpit instrument panels in the Boeing 707 jet aircraft through his research in perception
- Stuart Dempster – composer, trombonist, and Guggenheim Fellowship recipient
- Joël-François Durand – composer; professor of Composition; associate director, UW School of Music
- August Dvorak – educational psychologist most noted for the invention of the Dvorak keyboard layout
- Peter Erös – symphony and opera conductor
- Kathryn O. Galbraith – children's book writer
- Sarah Nash Gates – costume designer, historian of costuming, president of USITT
- John Goodlad – education researcher, author of A Place Called School
- Regan Gurung – Indian-American professor of psychology and author
- Richard Haag – designer of Gas Works Park; founded the Department of Landscape Architecture at the University of Washington
- Victor Hanzeli – former chair of the Department of Romance Languages and Literature
- Nancy Hartsock – feminist philosopher noted for her work in feminist epistemology and standpoint theory
- Huck Hodge – composer, winner of the Gaudeamus Prize
- Hsu Dau-lin – Chinese legal historian
- Charles R. Johnson – scholar, MacArthur Fellow, recipient of the Guggenheim Fellowship and winner of the National Book Award for writing Middle Passage
- Richard Karpen – composer; Director, UW School of Music
- Richard Kenney – poet
- W. Hudson Kensel – historian of the American West
- Jeffrey Kurtzman – musicologist
- Jacob Lawrence – among the best known African American painters of the 20th century
- Fang-kuei Li – linguist with expertise in Chinese and Native American languages
- Elizabeth Loftus – psychologist who works on human memory and how it can be changed by facts, ideas, suggestions and other forms of post-event information
- Fred Lukoff – linguist and scholar of Korean studies
- Alan Marlatt – psychologist who pioneered harm reduction
- Michael W. McCann – political scientist
- Heather McHugh – poet
- Edward Melcarth – painter, sculptor, and photographer
- Roy Andrew Miller – linguist notable for his advocacy of Japanese and Korean as members of the Altaic group of languages
- Bryan Monroe – editor, CNN Politics; editor-in-chief, Ebony magazine
- Frederick Newmeyer – linguist and 2002 president of the Linguistic Society of America
- James Palais – historian in the field of Korean history
- Lionel Pries – teacher of Minoru Yamasaki, A. Quincy Jones, and many Northwest Modern architects
- Kenneth B. Pyle – Japanese historian and former director of the Henry M. Jackson School of International Studies
- Tommy Rall – dancer; tap, men's ballet techniques, ballet partnering
- W.J. Rorabaugh – American historian; managing editor of Pacific Northwest Quarterly; author of The Alcoholic Republic
- Roger Sale – literary critic and author, noted for his influence on literary criticism on children's literature
- Steven Shaviro – cultural critic and author of Doom Patrols
- Spencer Shaw – librarian; professor of Library Science, Information School
- Craig Sheppard – pianist; professor of Piano; chair of the Keyboard Department, UW School of Music
- Vilem Sokol – music professor, string teacher, and conductor of the Seattle Youth Symphony Orchestras from the 1960s to the 1980s
- Robin Stacey – history professor, author of numerous articles and books on early medieval Britain and Ireland
- Pepper Schwartz – sociologist, author or co-author of numerous books, magazines, website columns, and a television personality on the subject of sexuality
- Daris Swindler – anthropologist; primate expert; his An Atlas of Primate Gross Anatomy is a standard work in the field
- Carole Terry – organist and harpsichordist; professor of Organ and Harpsichord
- David Wagoner – poet and novelist
- Adam Warren – historian and writer
- Melia Watras – violist and composer; professor of Viola; chair of the Strings Department, UW School of Music
- Daniel Waugh – director of the Seattle Silk Road Project; editor of the journal of the Silkroad Foundation
- Karl Wittfogel – sinologist and historian; author of Oriental Despotism: A Comparative Study of Total Power
- Turrell V. Wylie – Tibetologist and linguist: created the Wylie transliteration for the Tibetan language

=== Athletics ===
- Hiram Boardman Conibear – rowing coach
- Gil Dobie – undefeated (58-0-3) football coach of the University of Washington 1908–1916, whose tenure largely comprised the NCAA Division I-A record for an unbeaten streak (64 games) and who oversaw the entirety of the NCAA Division I-A's second longest winning streak (40 games); elected to the College Football Hall of Fame in 1951
- Marv Harshman – head basketball coach of the University of Washington 1971–1985
- Don James – head football coach 1974–1992
- Lorenzo Romar – former head basketball coach of the University of Washington
