= Pecqueur =

Pecqueur is a surname. Notable people with the surname include:

- Constantin Pecqueur (1801–1887), French economist
- Jean-Paul Pecqueur, American poet, critic, and professor
- Onésiphore Pecqueur (1792–1852), French mechanical engineer
