= Adam Warren =

Adam Warren may refer to:

- Adam Warren (comics) (born 1967), American comic book writer
- Adam Warren (baseball) (born 1987), Major League Baseball pitcher
- Adam Warren (cricketer) (born 1975), English cricketer
- Adam Warren (rugby union) (born 1991), Welsh rugby union player
- Adam Warren (musician) (born 1987), American deathcore singer
- Adam Warren (historian), American historian and writer

== See also ==
- Adam Warren Sketchbook
