= Anita Eileen Gale =

American aerospace engineer

- Education: University of Washington, B.S. and M.S. Aeronautics and Astronautics
- Occupation: Aerospace Engineer
- Known for: International Space Settlement Design Competitions
- Spouse: Richard P. "Dick" Edwards
- Awards: Rotary National Award for Space Achievement, NSS Space Pioneer Award, NSS Anita Gale Memorial Award
- Engineering career
- Institutions: National Space Society
- Employers: Rockwell, Boeing
- Projects: Space Shuttle
- Significant design: Payload interface standardization and containerization concepts (patents)

Anita Eileen Gale (1951–2024) was an American aerospace engineer who spent the majority of her working career on the Space Shuttle program. She was a luminary and leader in the National Space Society and the quest to expand humanity beyond Earth. Her legacy continues through the International Space Settlement Design Competitions for high school students that she originally designed and supported throughout her lifetime.

== Early life and education ==
Gale was born in White Center, Washington, an only child. Her father's first career was at the Rainier Brewery, followed by his second post-retirement career in real estate. Her mother was a secretary for a financial institution before becoming a full-time housewife. By the time Gale started grade school, her family had moved to a better school district in Bellevue, Washington.

Gale was fascinated by all things space at an early age. She followed space events starting with the Sputnik launch in 1957, followed by the Mercury missions. By the third grade, she read Jules Verne's From the Earth to the Moon. She read the stories of all the astronauts starting with Apollo. In ninth grade, she took an aptitude test. When the results suggested a career in aeronautical engineering, she began planning her career pathway. While her parents supported her career interests, she knew better than to share her interests with school counselors who were sure to steer her into more traditional roles for women in the 60's. Her teachers were more supportive. She took an engineering concept class in high school, graduating in 1969.

Gale earned her B.S. in Aeronautics and Astronautics in 1973 from the University of Washington. She worked as a proofreader one summer, held an internship at Procter & Gamble another summer, then spent a summer as an intern at Hughes Aircraft. While on campus, Gale was active in several student organizations: she served as president of the Tau Beta Pi chapter, as an officer of the American Institute of Aeronautics and Astronautics (AIAA) chapter, and as a Society of Women Engineers (SWE) representative on the engineering student council. Due to a lull in the aerospace industry job market, she stayed on at the UW to complete her M.S. in 1974.

== Career ==
Gale joined Rockwell International in Downey, California in 1974, starting in the structural dynamics department, working on analysis and testing of the Pogo dynamics phenomenon. In 1978, she went to work for Aerojet ElectroSystems as a senior member of the technical staff, where she worked with satellite test requirements and managed the development of a test set for the Defense Support Program satellite computer. In 1980, Gale returned to Rockwell in the Space Systems Division, as a Senior Project Engineer for the Space Shuttle Payload and Cargo Integration. She was the Rockwell liaison for the NASA flight assignments working group and was responsible for a wide range of managerial functions supporting contract performance requirements and metrics.

After the 1986 Space Shuttle Challenger disaster, Rockwell went into a two-year stand down. Gale served as the project engineering liaison for the structural analysis group and focused her efforts on improving the structural analysis tools and automating the process. She became the Verification Analysis Project Manager, responsible for structural and thermal analysis, mechanical and avionics installation, and safety. After three years, she returned as a Senior Project Engineer.

Gale was an advocate for standardization. She was invited to work on a standardization project for the National Aero-Space Plane, part of the aircraft division. Her task team focused on a containerized cargo proposal. A later proposal applied a similar concept for the Lockheed SR-71 Blackbird supersonic aircraft. Gale's three patents are based on these launch vehicle payload interface standardization and containerization concepts. The Rotary National Award for Space Achievement (RNASA) Foundation – established to encourage, recognize, honor, and celebrate U.S. space achievement -recognized Gale for her relentless pursuit of more cost-effective cargo integration approaches, reducing both time and budget required to integrate payloads and vehicles and to deliver payloads into orbit.

The Rockwell aerospace division was acquired by Boeing in 1996. Gale moved to Houston, Texas to work in the Boeing Commercial Crew Vehicle (CST-100) Cargo Integration in 2011 before retiring in 2016. She was appointed a Boeing Associate Technical Fellow in 2007.

== Awards, honors, organizations ==
Gale was an Associate Fellow of AIAA. She was a member of the AIAA Space Colonization Technical Committee and regularly chaired technical conference sessions and wrote technical papers. She served as Chair of the AIAA Orange County Section. Gale received the 2001 AIAA Sustained Service Award for nearly a quarter-century of service to the AIAA Orange County Section, as a Council Member and innovator of Space Settlement Design Competitions for high school students.

Gale was recognized as a Fellow of SWE in 1997. Gale was the 1976-78 president of the SWE Los Angeles Section, the 1981 Chair of the SWE National Convention in Anaheim, and the 1986 president of the chartering SWE Orange County Section. She served on the SWE society level executive board as the 1982 Director of Engineering Affairs. Gale was the Technical Program Director for the 1991 SWE National Convention in San Diego and helped welcome regionalization as the provisional Region B Director. She served as the Society Resnick Challenger Medal Awards Committee Chair for several years, starting in 1995.

Gale was the 2021 Chief Executive Officer of the nonprofit National Space Society (NSS). She first became a member of the NSS and its precursor organizations at the founding of the L5 Los Angeles Chapter (or OASIS Los Angeles Chapter of the NSS) in the late 1970s. She served as a long-time board member, officer, and member of the NSS Space Settlement Advocacy Committee, and chaired Space Settlement Sessions for International Space Development Conference in 2007 and 2008.

In 2008, she was recognized with the NSS Space Pioneer Award for her tireless educational outreach to the younger generation via her International Space Settlement Design Competition since 1984, and for running a space settlement student awards program.

In 2009, she was recognized with the Stellar Award by the RNASA Foundation for her relentless pursuit of more cost-effective cargo integration approaches, reducing both time and budget required to integrate payloads and vehicles and to deliver payloads into orbit.

In 2013, Gale was recognized with the SWE Distinguished Service Award for career-long dedication to helping women engineers realize their full potential and for mastering the delicate balance of leading and encouraging others to lead.

In 2021, she was recognized with the University of Washington Distinguished Alumni Award for her career accomplishments and the great works she has done for students.

== Legacy ==
In 1984, Gale, and her husband Richard P. "Dick" Edwards, co-founded the Space Settlement Design Competitions. The unique style of industry simulation games, were designed to engage high school students with a first-hand view of the technical and management activities in high pressure design proposals for future space settlements. NSS established the Anita Gale Memorial Award to recognize individuals who have dedicated their careers to the space community, celebrating their sustained impact and contributions.
