= Zelma Maine-Jackson =

American hydrogeologist

- Born: Gullah-Geechee Nation
- Other name: Zelma Jackson-Maine
- Education: Virginia State University University of Washington
- Scientific career
- Workplaces: Washington State Department of Ecology

Zelma Maine-Jackson, also known as Zelma Jackson-Maine, is an American hydrogeologist at the Washington Department of Ecology known for her long-term role in environmental remediation of nuclear waste at Hanford Site, for which she was covered in the Daughters of Hanford feature of Northwest Public Broadcasting in 2015.

== Early life and education ==
Maine-Jackson was raised by her grandmother in the Gullah-Geechee Nation in South Carolina until the age of seven when she moved to the U.S. Army Base in Heilbronn, Germany with her parents. She was inspired to study geology by her grandmother, a mid-wife, who taught her as a child that red clay was used to treat iron-deficiency in women. Her science based education and fluency in the German language paved the way for her later acceptance in an integration program. Partnered companies (ARCO, Shell, ConocoPhillips, and ExxonMobil) would pay for the participants' undergraduate education and in the summers the students would work in oil fields or uranium exploration sites. She earned her bachelor's degree from Virginia State University and her master's degree in economic geology from University of Washington. While working on her master's degree, Maine-Jackson found herself working at Mount Baker, only 300 miles north of Mount St. Helens when it erupted in 1980.

== Career ==
Before Maine-Jackson established her career in geology, she undertook an assignment as a wellsite geologist at a petroleum drilling rig in New Mexico. Maine-Jackson then started her career as an exploration geologist specializing in uranium mining in the Rockies for the Atlantic Richfield Oil Company. In the 1980s, she worked on drill rigs, including at the Hanford Site, where she studied the flow of groundwater toward storage sites of radioactive hazardous waste and analyzed the core samples that were drilled out. She has worked for the Washington Department of Ecology Nuclear Waste Program on decontaminating the Hanford Site for over twenty years. Maine-Jackson currently serves on the Board of Earth Sciences and Resources for the National Academies of Sciences, Engineering, and Medicine Division on Earth and Life Studies.

== Advocacy and Leadership Positions ==
Maine-Jackson is a trustee at The Nature Conservancy in South Carolina, where she works to protect loggerhead sea turtles and wildlife in the ACE Basin. She served on the State of Washington African American Affairs Commission during four governors, as chairperson of the City of Kennewick Diversity Commission, as a two-term appointee to the Washington State Community Economic Revitalization Board, and an advisory member to the Washington State Department of Natural Resources. She is a founding member of the National Association of Black Geoscientists. She has also served as an advocate for communities damaged by the environmental impacts of nuclear waste.
