= Elizabeth Van Volkenburgh =

Australian plant scientist

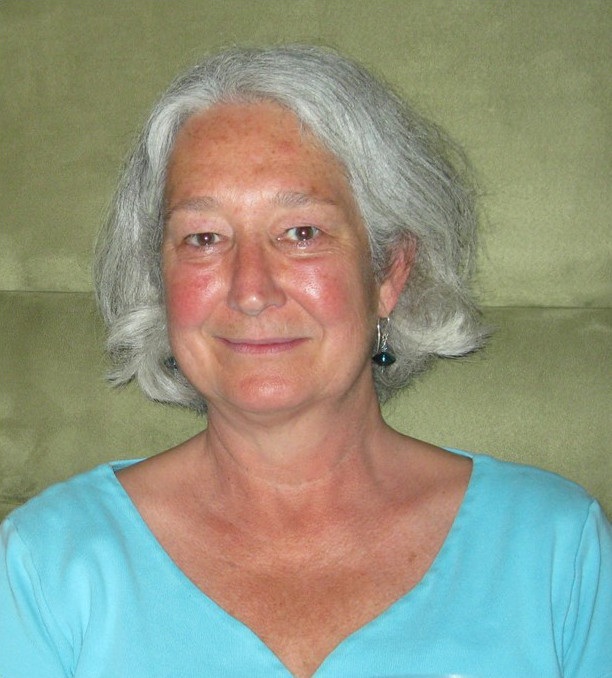
- Born: July 2, 1952 (age 74)
- Education: Duke University; University of Washington
- Known for: Plant biology
- Scientific career
- Workplaces: University of Washington

Elizabeth Van Volkenburgh (born July 2, 1952) is a Professor of Plant Science at the University of Washington. She has served as the president of the society for Plant Signaling and Behavior.

== Early life and education ==
Van Volkenburgh was born to Robert Heber and Jean Brown in Fort Sill, Oklahoma. Van Volkenburgh became interested in biology during high school. She studied botany at Duke University, and earned her Bachelor's degree in 1973. She was most interested in plant physiology and biochemical function. She nearly majored in economics because her mother recommended education that might lead to a paying job like being a lawyer or economist, but found that she learned better the life sciences. She also chose plant biology to avoid the stress brought to bear on the topics by premedical students at her school. After graduating, Van Volkenburgh worked as a technician in the Smithsonian Institution Botany Department and at the Duke University Phytotron. Van Volkenburgh earned her doctoral degree at the University of Washington, where she investigated how light regulates the rate of leaf expansion. She spent her early career in University of Illinois at Urbana–Champaign and moved to Lancaster University as a NATO Fellow for a postdoctoral fellowship.

== Research and career ==
In 1987 Van Volkenburgh joined the University of Washington as an assistant professor of botany. She worked closely with Reini Stettler, Toby Bradshaw and Tom Hinckley. She has led the Plant Growth Lab at the University of Washington for over thirty years. Her work considers the physiological regulation of leaf expansion in crop plants such as beans, corn and tomato. Leaf growth physiology relies on a range of environmental cues. She has studied plant growth and photobiology, as well as drought stress and genetic variation. She has worked on the rate of growth and drought tolerance in the common bean as well as in corn. Her lab has also worked on the physiological relevance leaf margin shape in tomato, and the contribution of adventitious roots in canopy soils on branches of old doug fir and big-leaf maple trees. Van Volkenburgh has been part of the American Association for the Advancement of Science ADVANCE program.

=== Selected publications ===
- Van Volkenburgh, Elizabeth (2008). "Stress tolerance in plants via habitat-adapted symbiosi". Microbe-Microbe and Microbe-Host Interactions. 2: 404–416.
- Van Volkenburgh, Elizabeth (2006). "Plant neurobiology: an integrated view of plant signaling". Trends in Plant Science. 11 (8): 413–419. doi:10.1016/j.tplants.2006.06.009. PMID 16843034.
- Van Volkenburgh, Elizabeth (1985). "Inhibitory Effects of Water Deficit on Maize Leaf Elongation". Plant Physiology.
- Van Volkenburgh, Elizabeth (2011). The Restless Plant. Harvard University Press. ISBN 9780674048638.
