= Ratul Mahajan =

Indian American computer systems researcher

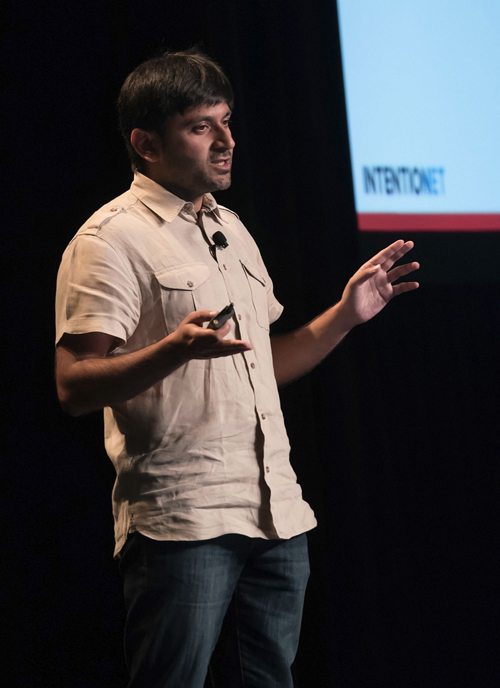
- Occupations: Computer systems researcher and academic

Academic background
- Education: BTech; MS, computer science and engineering Doctor of Philosophy, computer science and engineering
- Alma mater: Indian Institute of Technology; University of Washington

Academic work
- Institutions: Microsoft Research; Amazon Web Services; University of Washington
- Website: ratul.org

Ratul Mahajan is an Indian American computer systems researcher and academic. He is an associate professor at the University of Washington, where he also co-directs the Center for the Future of Cloud Infrastructure, and works as an Amazon Scholar with Amazon Web Services. His research focuses on improving cloud computing and large-scale computer systems through new architectures, tools, and network management approaches.

Mahajan's work has received multiple awards, including the 2005 IEEE William R. Bennett Prize, the 2009 Rising Star Award from the ACM Special Interest Group on Data Communications (SIGCOMM), the ACM Conference on Human Factors in Computing Systems (CHI) Honorable Mention Award in 2011, the ACM SIGCOMM Test of Time Award in 2014, the Microsoft Significant Contribution Award in 2016, the Best Dataset Award at the ACM Internet Measurement Conference (IMC) in 2016, and the Internet Engineering Task Force (IETF)'s Applied Networking Research Prize in 2024. He was named as an ACM Fellow in the 2025 class of fellows.

== Education ==
Mahajan earned a Bachelor of Technology from the Indian Institute of Technology in 1999, followed by a master's degree in Computer Science and Engineering in 2001 and a PhD in 2005, both from the University of Washington.

== Career ==
Mahajan began his career as a Researcher at Microsoft Research in 2005. He was appointed Senior Researcher in 2012 and Principal Researcher in 2014, a role he held until 2017. In 2017, he co-founded Intentionet, and served as its CEO until the company was acquired by Amazon in 2022, after which he became an Amazon Scholar. Concurrently, he joined the University of Washington as an associate professor in 2019. He co-founded the Center for the Future of Cloud Infrastructure, and has been its co-director since 2022.

== Research ==
Mahajan's research has centered on improving the reliability, efficiency, and scalability of large-scale computer systems, particularly in cloud computing, through the development of new architectures, formal methods, and network management approaches.

=== Application networking ===
Mahajan has conducted research in application-defined networking (ADN), an approach to building networks tailored for modern microservices-based applications. His research has identified inefficiencies including nearly twice the latency and CPU usage in current systems. Through ADN, application developers specify desired network functionalities using a high-level language, which a compiler translates into optimized implementations customized to application requirements and available hardware resources.

=== Network verification and high-level programming ===
Mahajan's work in network verification and high-level programming has focused on improving the correctness, reliability, and security of network configurations and test suites. He introduced a method to detect configuration errors by deriving and analyzing the expected data plane, enabling proactive identification of misconfigurations and validation of forwarding properties. Expanding on this, he co-developed Minesweeper, a general tool for control plane verification, which translates network configurations into logical formulas to prove correctness across all routing scenarios, identifying misconfigurations and security vulnerabilities in large-scale networks. He contributed to Propane, a system that defines network-wide policies using high-level constraints to generate router configurations, later extending it with Propane/AT to streamline network updates through abstract topologies. His work on Propane received the Best Paper Award at SIGCOMM 2016. He developed NetCov, a tool that analyzes network test suites to assess configuration coverage. Building on this, he introduced Yardstick, a framework for measuring test coverage in stateless data planes.

=== Optical networking ===
Alongside colleagues, Mahajan presented a free-space optics-based data center interconnect that uses a digital micromirror device (DMD) and photodetectors to enable dynamically reconfigurable direct links between racks. Analyzing optical layer outages in a large backbone network, he revealed variability in link availability, the predictive value of optical signal quality for future failures, and the need for traffic engineering strategies that account for optical layer performance and outage risk.

=== Software-defined networking ===
In software-defined networking, Mahajan has addressed bandwidth optimization, consistent data plane updates, and multi-controller coordination. He developed SWAN, a system for direct bandwidth control across global networks. With Roger Wattenhofer, he proposed methods for updating SDN data plane state, developed a minimal-dependency update algorithm to prevent packet loops, and outlined an architecture that balances consistency and efficiency. He created Statesman, a network "operating system" inspired by Git, which composes multiple applications by maintaining and merging different views of network state.

=== Wireless networks ===
In collaborative work, Mahajan demonstrated ViFi, a protocol that enhances vehicular WiFi by leveraging basestation diversity to reduce disruptions. His work further introduced Wit, a passive monitoring tool that merges incomplete traces, reconstructs lost packets, and infers network performance metrics.

=== Internet measurements ===
Mahajan's work on internet measurements introduced Internet mapping techniques to measure ISP topologies with fewer traces, improving accuracy and analyzing POP sizes, router outdegree, and inter-domain peering. Assessing path inflation across 65 ISPs, he identified topology, peering policies, and inter-domain routing as key causes, with traffic engineering playing a major role in inefficiencies. In joint research, he provided a quantitative analysis of BGP misconfigurations, revealing their pervasiveness, limited impact on connectivity, and the potential for prevention through improved router design.

=== Incentives in networked systems ===
Mahajan exhibited Wiser, an Internet routing protocol that extends BGP to enable ISPs to jointly optimize routing while acting in their own interests. Furthermore, he created Catch, a lightweight protocol that uses anonymous messaging to detect and isolate free-riders in multi-hop wireless networks.

=== Other work ===
Among other works, Mahajan and Frank McSherry evaluated the feasibility of differentially private network trace analysis, showing that while privacy constraints introduce some error, many analyses remain accurate, and developed a toolkit for privacy-preserving network studies. He also proposed mechanisms to detect and control high-bandwidth traffic aggregates, using local router detection and a cooperative pushback system to mitigate flash crowds and DoS attacks.

Mahajan developed HomeOS, a platform that treats networked devices as peripherals with abstract interfaces, enabling cross-device applications.

With Aruna Balasubramanian and Arun Venkataramani, he developed Wiffler, a system that augments 3G connectivity by leveraging delay tolerance and fast switching to offload data to WiFi when feasible.

Mahajan was involved in the development of Everflow, a telemetry system that traces packets, distributes traffic for analysis, and diagnoses faults in datacenter networks. His work also analyzed MPLS performance in Microsoft's online service network, identifying significant latency inflation across paths and pinpointing its causes through large-scale trace analysis.

== Awards and honors ==
- 2005 – William R. Bennett Prize, IEEE Communications Society
- 2009 – Rising Star Award, Association for Computing Machinery Special Interest Group on Data Communications (ACM SIGCOMM)
- 2011 – Honorable Mention Award, ACM Conference on Human Factors in Computing Systems (CHI)
- 2014 – Test of Time Award, ACM SIGCOMM
- 2016 – Best Dataset Award, ACM Internet Measurement Conference (IMC)
- 2016 – Significant Contribution Award, Microsoft
- 2024 – Applied Networking Research Prize, Internet Engineering Task Force
- 2025 – SIGCOMM Networking Systems Award, Association for Computing Machinery

== Selected articles ==
- Spring, N., Mahajan, R., & Wetherall, D. (2002). Measuring ISP topologies with Rocketfuel. ACM SIGCOMM Computer Communication Review, 32(4), 133–145.
- Mahajan, R., Bellovin, S. M., Floyd, S., Ioannidis, J., Paxson, V., & Shenker, S. (2002). Controlling high bandwidth aggregates in the network. ACM SIGCOMM Computer Communication Review, 32(3), 62–73.
- Falaki, H., Mahajan, R., Kandula, S., Lymberopoulos, D., Govindan, R., & Estrin, D. (2010). Diversity in smartphone usage. In Proceedings of the 8th international conference on Mobile systems, applications, and services (pp. 179–194).
- Balasubramanian, A., Mahajan, R., & Venkataramani, A. (2010). Augmenting mobile 3G using WiFi. In Proceedings of the 8th international conference on Mobile systems, applications, and services (pp. 209–222).
- Hong, C. Y., Kandula, S., Mahajan, R., Zhang, M., Gill, V., Nanduri, M., & Wattenhofer, R. (2013). Achieving high utilization with software-driven WAN. In Proceedings of the ACM SIGCOMM 2013 Conference on SIGCOMM (pp. 15–26).
- Xu, X., Yuan, Y., Kincaid, Z., Krishnamurthy, A., Mahajan, R., Walker, D., & Zhai, E. (2024). Relational Network Verification. In Proceedings of the ACM SIGCOMM 2024 Conference (pp. 213–227).
