= Boeing Technical Fellowship =

Technical leadership career path at Boeing

The Boeing Technical Fellowship program is a highly selective technical leadership career path at The Boeing Company, similar in nature to the IBM Fellows program. Established in 1989, the role of the engineers and scientists serving as Technical Fellows is to set technical direction for Boeing, and to resolve issues that arise when the company creates new products. There are currently five levels in the Boeing Technical Fellowship program, each level reflecting varying degrees of impact within the company and in the industry at large: Associate Technical Fellow, Technical Fellow, and Senior Technical Fellow. In addition to Senior Technical Fellows, who are the director level, in 2019 Boeing added the level of Principal Senior Technical Fellow, at the senior director level, and Distinguished Senior Technical Fellow, at the vice president level.

Election into the Technical Fellowship follows a formal process. Prospective Technical Fellows are nominated by management, and evaluated by the program based on five criteria:

- technical knowledge and judgment
- creative problem solving and innovation
- technical leadership, advising and consulting
- capability as a teacher and mentor
- technical vision.

If the candidate shows strength in these areas, the candidate is then interviewed by a board. If the results of the interview are positive, the candidate advances to the Chief technology officer's office, for review and approval. As a result of the vetting process, the program includes only approximately 1.5% of Boeing’s workforce and represents “some of the best engineering and scientific minds at Boeing and in the industry.”
