= Jessica Werk =

American astronomer

- Education: Wesleyan University; University of Michigan
- Occupation: Assistant Professor at University of Washington

Jessica K. Werk is an American astronomer and an associate professor in the Department of Astronomy at the University of Washington. Her work includes the study of intergalactic and interstellar media. Werk was a Hubble fellow at the University of California, Santa Cruz from 2013 to 2016, and won the $65,000 Sloan Fellowship in 2018. Her research focuses on the role of gas in the formation and evolution of galaxies and the intergalactic medium, primarily through spectroscopic observations in the optical and ultraviolet.

== Early life and education ==
Jessica Werk was born in Hartford, Connecticut in 1981. She received a Bachelor of Arts degree in Physics and Astronomy with high honors at Wesleyan University in 2003, and a PhD in Astronomy at the University of Michigan in 2010. Her PhD focused on HII regions in the outskirts of normal spiral galaxies.

== Academic career ==
Werk was a National Science Foundation graduate student fellow at University of Michigan from 2006-2009, a visiting scholar at Columbia University from 2008-2010, and a postgraduate research fellow at University of California, Santa Cruz from 2010-2013. Since 2016, she has held the position of assistant professor at the University of Washington.

== Research ==
Werk studies the largely unexplored extended gaseous components of galaxies using both ground and space-based spectral observations in the optical and ultraviolet regimes. Her work defines observational constraints for cosmological simulations, and focuses on the dark-matter halo and disk-halo interface. She aims to understand the cosmic baryon cycle that traces how baryons pass from stellar interiors through the interstellar medium and intergalactic medium.

She has worked on developing the Hubble COS-Halos Survey, which uses the Hubble Space Telescope Cosmic Origins Spectrograph (COS), alongside ground-based observations, to study the prominent role gas plays in driving galactic evolution. Results from the COS-Halos Survey are presented in "The COS-Halos Survey: An Empirical Description of Metal-line Absorption in the Low-redshift Circumgalactic Medium" by Werk et al., and the paper "The COS-Halos Survey: Physical Conditions and Baryonic Mass in the Low-redshift Circumgalactic Medium" by Werk et al. The latter work established that there are likely more baryons in the extended halos of galaxies than there are in the galaxy disks. This conclusion highlights the importance of studying the physical state and complex history of what has become known as the circumgalactic medium.
