= Jennifer Hunter =

American mammalogist

Jennifer Susan Hunter
- Education: University of Washington (BS); University of California, Davis (PhD)
- Scientific career
- Workplaces: University of California, Berkeley
- Thesis: Adaptations to intraguild competition in mesocarnivores

Jennifer Susan Hunter is an American mammalogist and Resident Director at the Hastings Natural History Reservation.

== Early life and education ==
Hunter was an undergraduate at the University of Washington, where she studied wildlife sciences and statistics. For her graduate studies she moved down the West Coast, joining the University of California. Hunter completed her doctoral degree at the University of California, Davis. As part of her doctorate she worked on the University of California reserves. After graduating, Hunter volunteered with Audubon California's Landowner Stewardship program.

== Research and career ==
Hunter studied the carnivorous animals of the Americas. As part of these efforts, Hunter showed that, unlike other mammals, skunks did not have strategies to avoid predators. Instead, skunks have an abrupt discrimination of dark and light colouring, which warns predators of their noxious scent. In 2012 Hunter joined the Monterey Bay Aquarium, where she studied mahi-mahi, Cobia and Spanish mackerel.

In 2014 Hunter returned to the University of California, joining Berkeley as project coordinator for the Eel River Critical Zone Observatory at Angelo Coast Range Reserve. The laboratory investigates the interaction of abiotic and biotic factors with the near-surface environment.

Hunter was appointed Director of the Hastings Natural History Reservation in Carmel Valley, which is one of the oldest field stations in the world. The reserve is 2,500 acres and home to three seasonal creeks.

== Personal life ==
Hunter is married with two children.
