= Virginia Minnich =

American molecular biologist (1910–1996)

- Virginia Minnich, 1972
- Born: January 24, 1910; Zanesville, Ohio, US
- Died: April 26, 1996 (aged 86); Pensacola, Florida, United States
- Education: Ohio State University (BS); Iowa State College (MS)
- Known for: hematology, nutrition
- Scientific career
- Fields: biology, hematology, molecular biology, biochemistry, nutrition
- Workplaces: Washington University in St. Louis, Barnes Hospital

Virginia Minnich (1910–1996) was an American molecular biologist and hematology researcher known for discovering hemoglobin E, an abnormal form of hemoglobin that can cause blood disorders, and for working out the glutathione synthesis pathway. She was a noted blood morphologist and teacher and helped set up hematology laboratories around the world. She was the first person without a PhD or MD to be appointed a Professor of Medicine at Washington University School of Medicine.

== Early life and education ==
Minnich was born on January 24, 1910, in Zanesville, Ohio, and raised on her family's farm. She suffered severe burns at the age of four when her dress caught fire from a gas stove and she underwent close to thirty operations to correct the resultant disfigurement. Despite the surgeries, she was left with considerable scarring to her face, neck, and upper body that led some colleagues to discourage her from jobs requiring much human interaction.

She had wanted to become a nurse, but was discouraged from this career path, so she decided to study to become a dietician. She received a Bachelor of Science in Home Economics from Ohio State University in 1937 and a master's degree in Nutrition from Iowa State College in 1938. In her senior year, Minnich worked part-time in the hematology laboratory of Carl V. Moore, with whom she would later work with extensively at Washington University. Minnich never received a doctorate degree, a decision which she regretted and which she attributed to dissuasion from Moore. She believed Moore's discouragement held back her salary and career advancement compared to men doing similar work.

== Career ==
After graduating from Ohio State University in 1938, Minnich wrote to Carl Moore to ask for a job and he offered her a position as a research technician helping start a Hematology department at Washington University. She remained at Washington University for her entire career. She was promoted to a research associate in 1954, research assistant professor in 1958, research associate professor in 1963, and full professor of Medicine in 1974 (the first person without a doctorate degree to reach this rank at Washington University). She became professor emeritus in 1978 and retired in 1984. She also worked at Barnes Hospital in St. Louis from 1975 to the mid-1980s as assistant and then associate director of Hematology.

She was regarded as an excellent teacher and, in addition to her official teaching responsibilities, she gave informal "night courses" to pathologists, lab technicians, and others. She created a series of audiovisual teaching materials describing the morphology of blood and bone marrow that were published by the American Society of Clinical Pathologists in the early 1980s as a 10-part course in morphologic hematology.

=== International work ===
Minnich established a hematology laboratory at the University of Havana in 1945. In 1951, she went to Bangkok, Thailand for a year as part of an exchange program between Bangkok's Siriraj Hospital and Washington University. There, in addition to teaching, she began her research on thalassemia and hemoglobinopathies and she returned for three months in 1954 to continue this work. In 1964, she traveled to Turkey on a Fulbright scholarship and set up a Hematology laboratory in the University of Ankara's pediatrics department (later renamed the Virginia Minnich Hematology Laboratory in her honor).

== Research ==
Minnich's research encompassed a variety of hematology and nutrition topics, many centered around iron metabolism. She published over 45 scientific papers and 19 abstracts including noted work on blood disorders (in particular thrombocytopenic purpura, thalassemia, and hemoglobinopathies); the relationship between pica and iron deficiency; and synthesis of the antioxidant glutathione.

Early Work

Minnich participated in early research into iron metabolism, including studies of fluctuation in women's iron levels throughout their menstrual cycle and investigations into how iron is best absorbed. Through this work she helped develop more accurate methods for analyzing the data they collected and, throughout her career she continued to ensure that best practices were being followed in Washington University's Hematology department. From 1949 to 1951 she worked with William Harrington in a landmark study involving self-experimentation that showed that low blood platelet counts in idiopathic thrombocytopenic purpura were caused by an immune response leading to platelet destruction.

Hemoglobin E

While in Thailand in 1951, Minnich found an unusually high rate of thalassemias, blood disorders characterized by decreased levels of the oxygen-carrying molecule hemoglobin. Upon further examination, she discovered that this was an undescribed form of thalassemia involving a novel abnormal hemoglobin molecule, hemoglobin E caused by a mutation in the β-globin gene (HBB). People who inherit one copy of the HbE gene and one copy of the normal β-globin gene (HbA) are said to "carry the HbE trait", and are asymptomatic, as are most people who inherit two copies of HbE. However, inheritance of one HbE copy and one copy of HBB with a different mutation, such as one that causes β-thalassemia or sickle cell anemia, leads to a thalassemia ranging from mild to severe depending on the nature of the second mutation. Minnich was the first person to describe hemoglobin E/β-thalassemia, in 1951. Her work led to further research into this disease, which is estimated to affect a million people worldwide. HbE is considered to be one of the most common genetic mutations, with carrier rates approaching 60% in some parts of Southeast Asia, and testing for HbE is now part of routine neonatal screening and genetic counseling.

Pica

In 1965, while in Turkey setting up a hematology laboratory at the University of Ankara, Minnich noticed a form of pica involving clay eating. When she followed up this research upon her return to Washington University, she found a similar clay eating practice in parts of the United States. Pica had been known to be associated with iron deficiency but the cause/effect relationship was unclear; Minnich found that that clay actually made iron deficiency worse by acting as a chelating agent, binding iron in the bloodstream and removing it from the body.

Glutathione synthesis

In 1970, a former colleague, Dan Mohler, referred her to a family with a glutathione synthetase deficiency, leading her to develop and perform biochemical assays to elucidate the glutathione synthesis pathway.

== Later life ==
Minnich retired from Washington University in 1984. She died of ovarian and colon cancer April 26, 1996, in Pensacola, Florida. She willed her estate to the Washington University School of Medicine to be used for student scholarships, and Washington University established a visiting professorship in clinical hematology in her name.

== Awards and honors ==
- Fulbright fellowship for research in pediatric hematology
- Honorary Doctorate of Science from William Woods College (1972)
- Honorary service award from the Ohio State University Home Economics Alumni Association
- Honorary member of the Turkish Society of Hematology
- Selected as a "Woman of Achievement" by the Group Action Council of Metropolitan St. Louis (1947)

== Selected publications ==
Thrombocytopenic purpura

- Harrington, William J.; Sprague, Charles C.; Minnich, Virginia; Moore, Carl V.; Aulvin, Robert C.; Dubach, Reubenia (1953-03-01). "Immunologic mechanisms in idiopathic and neonatal thrombocytopenic purpura". Annals of Internal Medicine. 38 (3): 433–69. doi:10.7326/0003-4819-38-3-433. ISSN 0003-4819. PMID 13031392.

Hemoglobin E

- Minnich, V.; Na-Nakorn, S.; Chong-Chareonsuk, S.; Kochaseni, S. (January 1954). "Mediterranean anemia; a study of thirty-two cases in Thailand". Blood. 9 (1): 1–23. doi:10.1182/blood.V9.1.1.1. ISSN 0006-4971. PMID 13115468.
- Chernoff, Amoz I.; Minnich, Virginia; Chongchareonsuk, Soodsarkorn (1954). "Hemoglobin E, a Hereditary Abnormality of Human Hemoglobin". Science. 120 (3120): 605–606. Bibcode:1954Sci...120..605C. doi:10.1126/science.120.3120.605. JSTOR 1682300. PMID 13205193.

Pica

- Okcuoglŭ, A.; Arcasoy, A.; Minnich, V.; Tarcon, Y.; Cin, S.; Yörükoğlu, O.; Demirag, B.; Renda, F. (August 1966). "Pica in Turkey. 1. The incidence and association with anemia". The American Journal of Clinical Nutrition. 19 (2): 125–131. doi:10.1093/ajcn/19.2.125. ISSN 0002-9165. PMID 5222998.
- Minnich, V.; Okçuoğlu, A.; Tarcon, Y.; Arcasoy, A.; Cin, S.; Yörükoğlu, O.; Renda, F.; Demirağ, B. (January 1968). "Pica in Turkey. II. Effect of clay upon iron absorption". The American Journal of Clinical Nutrition. 21 (1): 78–86. doi:10.1093/ajcn/21.1.78. ISSN 0002-9165. PMID 5237295.

Glutathione synthesis

- Minnich, V.; Smith, M. B.; Brauner, M. J.; Majerus, P. W. (March 1971). "Glutathione biosynthesis in human erythrocytes. I. Identification of the enzymes of glutathione synthesis in hemolysates". The Journal of Clinical Investigation. 50 (3): 507–513. doi:10.1172/JCI106519. ISSN 0021-9738. PMC 291957. PMID 5545117.
- Majerus, P. W.; Brauner, M. J.; Smith, M. B.; Minnich, V. (August 1971). "Glutathione synthesis in human erythrocytes. II. Purification and properties of the enzymes of glutathione biosynthesis". The Journal of Clinical Investigation. 50 (8): 1637–1643. doi:10.1172/JCI106652. ISSN 0021-9738. PMC 442063. PMID 5097571.
