= Kristin Halbrook =

American author of young adult fiction

- Education: University of Washington
- Occupation: Writer
- Writing career
- Genre: Young-adult literature
- Website: www.kristinhalbrook.com

Kristin Halbrook is an American author of young adult fiction. Nobody But Us, her debut novel, was published on January 29, 2013 by HarperTeen, an imprint of HarperCollins Publishers. The novel has been optioned by Haven Entertainment for development as a film project.

== Biography ==
Kristin Halbrook is an American author of young adult fiction, known for her novel Nobody But Us. She was born in Anaheim, California and moved to the Pacific Northwest with her family as a child. She attended the University of Washington in Seattle, studying English literature and Women's studies as an undergraduate and Secondary Education in graduate school. Halbrook has worked with Title 1 students from elementary to high school ages teaching writing and nutrition education, as a tutor, and as a freelance writer. She is a cofounder of the young adult reading and writing website YA Highway.

Halbrook currently resides in Seattle with her husband and three children. She enjoys playing sports, travel, food culture and attending music events.

== Works ==
Nobody But Us, HarperTeen. January 29, 2013.
Published in German as Die Geschichte von Zoe und Will by Heyne Fliegt, Random House. July 22, 2013.
Published in French as Rien Que Nous by Les Editions Albin Michel. September 2013

== Reception ==
ALA Booklist writes that Nobody But Us is "raw, immediate, and utterly unflinching. Halbrook's debut features complex characters, and attempting to puzzle them out makes for a thought-provoking read." Publishers Weekly calls it "a dark, romantic wild ride reminiscent of Thelma and Louise."

In August 2013, it was announced that the novel has been optioned by Haven Entertainment for development as a feature film, under the title Will and Zoe. Short film director Leanne Welham has signed on to adapt the novel and direct the film, and Jesse Hara, Kevin Mann, and Pouya Shahbazian of New Leaf Literary will serve as executive producers.
