= Kermit Ritland =

Canadian ecologist and geneticist

- Occupations: Ecologist and geneticist

Academic background
- Education: Bachelor of Science; Doctor of Philosophy
- Alma mater: University of Washington Seattle; University of California Davis

Kermit Ritland is an ecologist and geneticist. He is a professor for the Department of Forest and Conservation Sciences at the University of British Columbia.

Ritland is most known for his research in ecology, genetics, and genomics, with a specific focus on forest populations and plant mating systems. He was part of the world's first tree genome project which was a collaborative effort involving 34 institutions. He secured a Canada Foundation for Innovation (CFI) Grant to fund his research in forest genomics. He also conducted studies on the genetics of spirit bears, a white morph of the American black bear, collecting hair samples to contribute to the understanding of the factors influencing their unique coloration.

== Education ==
Ritland obtained his Bachelor of Science from the University of Washington, Seattle, and completed his Ph.D. in 1982 at the University of California, Davis, with a specialization in botany and genetics.

== Research ==
Ritland has researched plant biology and genetics, to examine the sequenced genomes of major land plant lineages. His work has spanned population and quantitative genetics, with a particular emphasis on plant mating systems, contributing to the development of novel statistical methods in genetics and genomics, especially in the context of conservation genetics in forest trees.

=== Molecular markers and genetic relationships in natural populations ===
Ritland has explored the impact of climate change on forest trees, particularly the consequences of gene flow. He proposed a mixed mating model for multiple unlinked loci with Subodh Jain, outlining a procedure to estimate outcrossing rates using genotypic data from families. In 1996, he introduced Method-of-Moments Estimators for two-gene coefficients of relationship and inbreeding, along with four-gene Cotterman coefficients. He alongside Michael Lynch, introduced regression estimators for joint estimation of two-gene and four-gene coefficients of relationship using codominant molecular markers in randomly mating populations. His study on plant mating systems published in Heredity presented four model extensions using genetic markers, providing formulas for method-of-moments estimators for individual outcrossing rates in both gymnosperms and angiosperms. In addition, he investigated the balance of positive and negative consequences of gene flow in different distribution sections, suggesting integrated research in dispersal biology.

=== Genomic analysis ===
Ritland has made contributions to forest genetics for sustainable management and conservation. He reported the draft genome of the black cottonwood tree using shotgun sequence assembly and genetic mapping, resulting in a chromosome-scale reconstruction that unveiled over 45,000 putative protein-coding genes. He also contributed to a 2013 Nature publication presenting the draft assembly of the 20-gigabase genome of Norway spruce, identifying novel genomic features. In a study on scalable bioinformatics tools, he and fellow researchers provided genomics resources for forest management and conservation by utilizing Illumina platforms and ABySS software for whole-genome shotgun sequencing. This approach yielded a 20.8 giga base pairs draft genome of white spruce (Picea glauca) assembled into 4.9 million scaffolds.

=== Mating systems ===
Ritland introduced a mating system model for partially selfing populations by employing electrophoretic markers in two Mimulus guttatus populations and proposed marker loci with multiple alleles as a potential solution. In addressing the challenge of developing simple sequence repeat (SSR) markers in conifer genomes, he, along with collaborators, utilized expressed sequence tags (ESTs) from a 20,275-unigene spruce dataset, identifying 44 EST-SSR markers. He investigated vascular and interfascicular fiber differentiation along the bolting stems axis in Arabidopsis by utilizing global transcript profiling with an Arabidopsis full-genome longmer microarray, revealing 182 upregulated transcription factors linked to fiber development.

== Selected articles ==
- Ritland, K. (1996). "Estimators for pairwise relatedness and individual inbreeding coefficients". Genetics Research. 67 (2): 175–185. doi:10.1017/S0016672300033620.
- Lynch, M.; Ritland, K. (1999). "Estimation of pairwise relatedness with molecular markers". Genetics. 152 (4): 1753–1766. doi:10.1093/genetics/152.4.1753. PMC 1460714. PMID 10430599.
- Ritland, K (2002). "Extensions of models for the estimation of mating systems using n independent loci". Heredity. 88 (4): 221–228. Bibcode:2002Hered..88..221R. doi:10.1038/sj.hdy.6800029. PMID 11920127.
- Tuskan, G. A.; et al. (2006). "The genome of black cottonwood, Populus trichocarpa (Torr. & Gray)". Science. 313 (5793): 1596–1604. Bibcode:2006Sci...313.1596T. doi:10.1126/science.1128691. OSTI 901819. PMID 16973872.
- Nystedt, Björn; et al. (2013). "The Norway spruce genome sequence and conifer genome evolution". Nature. 497 (7451): 579–584. Bibcode:2013Natur.497..579N. doi:10.1038/nature12211. hdl:1854/LU-4110028. PMID 23698360.
