= Michael W. McCann =

American political scientist

- Education: University of Florida; University of California, Berkeley
- Occupation: Political scientist

Michael W. McCann is an American political scientist. He was the Gordon Hirabayashi Professor for the Advancement of Citizenship in the department of political science at the University of Washington.
