= Tessa Lau =

American computer scientist

- Education: Cornell University, University of Washington
- Known for: Robotics
- Scientific career
- Fields: Machine Learning, Artificial Intelligence, Human-Computer Interaction, Robotics

Tessa Lau is a computer scientist, roboticist, and entrepreneur who has drawn on her experience with artificial intelligence, machine learning, and robotics knowledge to solve problems in the hospitality and construction industries. She is the founder and CEO of Dusty Robotics, where she focuses on developing robots that optimize construction work through automation. Lau was also the former CTO of Savioke, where she helped develop and deploy robots for the hospitality industry.

== Education ==
Lau obtained a BS in computer science from Cornell University in 1995 and graduated with a PhD in machine learning with an emphasis on Human-Computer Interaction from the University of Washington in 2001.

== Career ==
Lau spent 11 years at IBM Research working in business process automation and knowledge capture. She then became a research scientist at Willow Garage, where she developed simple user interfaces for personal robots. After Willow Garage shut down in 2013, Lau co-founded Savioke, which developed robots for hotels and apartments. As Chief Technology Officer (CTO), she deployed over 75 delivery robots in the hospitality industry.

Lau's drive for faster growth and finding solutions to more pressing problems led her to leave Savioke and establish her own robotics company within a new industry. She first identified problems in the construction industry when she was remodeling her house and noticed the mistakes made by the manual laborers faced with their limited tools. She then began visiting construction sites to learn more about the industry and identify opportunities for artificial intelligence to come into play. As a result of this research, she co-founded Dusty Robotics in 2018 with Philipp Herget, previous robotics hardware lead at Savioke, in Mountain View, California. Lau is the current chief executive officer (CEO) of the company, while Herget is the current CTO. Dusty Robotics has innovated operations in the construction industry with the Field Printer, a digital layout robot. Normally, chalk-line layouts are implemented on construction sites, which leads to large financial and time costs when construction workers attempt to follow the intended blueprint of the architects. As a solution, the robot uses Building Information Modeling (BIM) to print accurate, full-scale, digital plans directly on construction sites, in turn improving the accuracy of the guiding map. Big contractors like DPR Construction, Turner Construction and Performance Contracting have been using the Field Printer to streamline construction processes. As a testament to its massive success and future potential, Dusty Robotics has raised nearly $70 million from investors as of May 2023.

Besides her accomplishments as CEO of Dusty Robotics, Lau serves as Advisor of Cantos Ventures and Venture Partner at NextGen Venture Partners. She was also a member of the CRA-W board, the Computing Research Association (CRA)'s committee focusing on the status of women in computing research.

== Awards and recognition ==
In 2015, Lau was recognized as one of the most creative people in business by Fast Company. In 2017, she was named a 2017 Woman of Influence by The Silicon Valley Business Journal. In 2018, she was named by Inc. as one of the Top 5 Innovative Women to Watch in Robotics.
