= William Ka Ming Lau =

Chinese-American scientist

William K. M. Lau
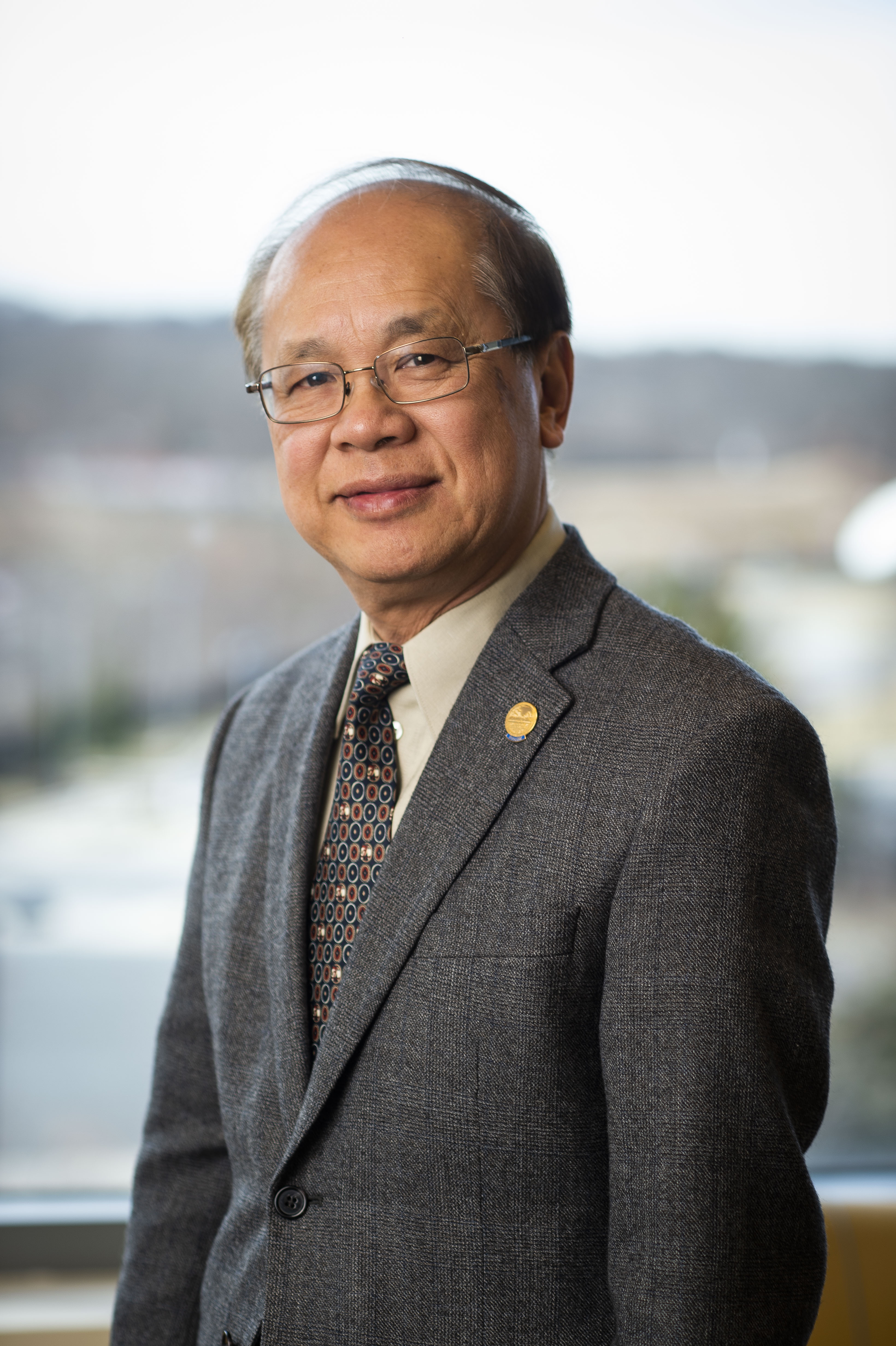
- Born: 22 March 1950 (age 76)
- Employers: University of Maryland; NASA Goddard Space Flight Center
- Scientific career
- Education: University of Hong Kong (BSc); University of Washington, Seattle (PhD)
- Fields: tropical meteorology, monsoon dynamics, aerosol-monsoon interaction, climate variability and change

William Ka Ming Lau (born 22 March 1950) is a senior scientist at the Earth System Science Interdisciplinary Center, a research center at the University of Maryland and an adjunct professor of the Department of Atmospheric and Oceanic Sciences at the University of Maryland. A physicist by training, his research spans over 4 decades covering a wide range of topics in climate dynamics, tropical meteorology, ocean-atmosphere coupling, aerosol-water cycle interactions, and climate variability and change. Lau conducted pioneering research on atmospheric teleconnection, and the global monsoon climate system. He discovered the aerosol-monsoon regional feedback mechanism, i.e., the Elevated Heat Pump (EHP) effect that strongly modulate climate change in Asian monsoon regions. He was the senior author of a popular research reference book, "Intraseasonal Variability in the Atmosphere-Ocean Climate System".

== Education ==
Lau was born in Macau. He received his early education at a grade school run by the Jesuit China missions. In 1960, his family emigrated to Hong Kong, where he completed his high school education in New Method College. He received his BSc (Mathematics and Physics) in 1972; BSc Special (Applied Mathematics) in 1973 from the University of Hong Kong; PhD in Atmospheric Sciences in 1977, from the University of Washington in Seattle, Washington.

== Academic career ==
After graduating from the University of Washington, he was recruited as assistant professor at the Naval Postgraduate School (1978–1980). In 1981, he joined the NASA Goddard Space Flight Center (GSFC) as a civil servant scientist. At GSFC, he rose through the ranks serving as the Head of the Climate and Radiation Branch (1991–2000), Chief of the Laboratory for Atmospheres (2001–2010), and the Deputy Director for Science, NASA Goddard Space Flight Center Earth Science Division (2011–2014). In 2015, he retired from GSFC, and joined ESSIC. Lau frequently visits international research and academic institutions around the world to present invited lectures, keynote presentations in scientific meetings, and public speeches to promote awareness on impacts of climate change on regional weather extremes. He has served on numerous national and international science steering groups, committees and review panels, including as Chair of Climate Variability (CLIVAR) monsoon panel, and member of the science steering group of Global Energy and Water Exchanges (GEWEX), World Climate Research Programme (WCRP). He was a coauthor of the chapter on regional effects of climate change of the Intergovernmental Panel on Climate Change (IPCC), and a U.S. National Academy of Sciences report on "Himalayan Glaciers: Climate Change, Water Resources and Security. In 2014–16, he served as the President of the Atmospheric Science Section of the American Geophysical Union.

== Awards and honors ==
Lau has received many awards and honors for his research accomplishments and leadership, including:

- American Geophysical Union Editor’s Citation for Excellence in Refereeing (2020)
- Fellow of the American Association for the Advancement of Science (AAAS), 2020
- Axford Distinguished Lecturer Award, Asia Oceania Geophysical Society (2017)
- Honorary Professor, Peking University(2016)
- Bromery Lecturer, Johns Hopkins University (2015)
- Honorary Professor from the School of Energy and Environment, City University of Hong Kong (2011)
- Distinguished Alumni Award, Hong Kong University (2010)
- Fellow of the American Geophysical Union (2007)
- Fellow of the American Meteorological Society (2005)
- Distinguished Meteorologist Award, Hong Kong Observatory (2004)
- Goddard Senior Fellow
- NASA William Nordberg Award (1999)
- Clarence Leroy Meisinger Award, American Meteorological Society
- The John Lindsay Award for Science
- William Nordberg Medal in Earth Science (1999)
- President, the Chinese-American Ocean-Atmosphere Association (1991–1992)
- NASA Exceptional Achievement Medal (1991), Goddard Senior Fellow
- American Meteorological Society Clarence Leroy Meisinger Award (1988) "for outstanding contributions enhancing our understanding of atmospheric low frequency oscillations"
- "Most Promising Young Scientist", Tenki, the bulletin journal of the Meteorological Society of Japan (1988)
- John Lindsay Award (1987), NASA/GSFC highest award in Science
- "Top ten science and technology talents in the Washington Area", selected by Washington Technology (1987)
- Graduate with First Class Honors, BSc (1972), and BSc Special (1973), University of Hong Kong
