= Jean-Paul Pecqueur =

American poet, critic, and professor

Jean-Paul Pecqueur is an American poet, critic, and professor. He is author of The Case Against Happiness (Alice James Books, 2006), winner of a New England/New York Award. Publishers Weekly, in praising The Case Against Happiness, wrote "...a promising poet with a generosity of spirit and the knowledge that 'joy is not impossible,'" and Library Journal wrote, "Sardonic and humorous, cynical and complex, these metaphysical musings celebrate the nameless dread, the logic of the illogical. They address big ideas: life, death, heaven, shoe shopping. They twist and loop, follow to unexpected conclusions...." Pecqueur has had his poems and reviews published in literary journals and magazines including American Letters & Commentary, The Hat, ZYZZYVA, and Rain Taxi.

Pecqueur is from Tacoma, Washington, and earned his B.A. in interdisciplinary studies and his M.F.A. in creative writing from the University of Washington. He teaches at the Pratt Institute and York College of the City University of New York, and he lives in New York. His honors include the Academy of American Poets Harold Taylor Prize. He is also a member of the Alice James Books Cooperative Board.
