= Adam Warren (historian) =

American historian and writer

- Education: University of California, San Diego
- Occupations: Historian, writer

Adam Warren is an American historian and writer. He is the Williams Family Endowed Professor in the department of history at the University of Washington.

In 2010, Warren wrote the book Medicine and Politics in Colonial Peru: Population Growth and the Bourbon Reforms, published by the University of Pittsburgh Press.
