= Sanewashing =

Downplaying the radical aspects of a person or idea

Sanewashing is the act of minimizing the perceived extreme aspects of a person or idea in order to make them appear more acceptable to a wider audience. The term initially garnered political attention in online discussions about defunding the police in 2020, but it has come to greater prominence in critique of media practices relating to Donald Trump in the 2024 United States presidential election. Journalism organizations and media commentators have suggested actions both readers and writers can take to mitigate sanewashing.

== History ==
The earliest usage of sanewashing dates to 2007 in a blog post written by academic Dale Carrico. The first known usage of the term in a political context is dated to 2020 and is credited to a user on r/neoliberal, a Reddit forum for neoliberals, to describe how progressive rhetoric around "defund the police" shifted from calling for police abolition to advocating for alternative public safety and social services programs. In 2024, journalist Aaron Rupar was credited with being the first to use the term in the specific context of media reporting of Donald Trump 2024 presidential campaign.

Journalism school and research organization the Poynter Institute defines it as "the act of packaging radical and outrageous statements in a way that makes them seem normal", and suggests it is analogous to greenwashing or sportswashing.

== 2024 United States presidential campaign ==
Paul Farhi wrote in The Atlantic, in reference to the term, that reporters have a "tendency to render the Republican candidate's most bizarre and incoherent statements into cogent English, shearing off the crazy in a misleading manner". Kelly McBride, in discussing whether NPR is guilty of sanewashing, wrote that the news organization has been criticized for what it describes as "packaging Trump's ideas into news stories as if they are sensible suggestions". Columnist Will Bunch wrote in September 2024 that he thought sanewashing "has all but clinched Merriam-Webster's Word of the Year for 2024", although their actual word of the year was "polarization". The Associated Press published multiple perspectives on sanewashing in an October 9 article, with some media critics advocating for more unfiltered quotes and clips of Trump and others pushing back on whether the media has been guilty of the practice leading up to the 2024 election.

=== Examples ===
- The Hill reported that Nate Silver suggested Democratic vice presidential candidate Tim Walz was sanewashing JD Vance by saying "nothing about the Republican ticket's conspiratorial claims about Haitian immigrants eating pets, for instance" in their debate. At the same debate, MSNBC accused JD Vance of sanewashing by "interpreting" for Trump.
- MSNBC suggests The New York Times' coverage of an answer Trump gave to the Economic Club of New York was sanewashing: "After one member asked Trump a very specific question about the rising cost of child care, the Republican presidential candidate responded with a two-minute rant about tariffs, the deficit and fraud. Yet The New York Times chose to cover Trump's comments [by] headlining their piece on the event, 'Trump Calls for an Efficiency Commission, an Idea Pushed by Elon Musk'. The Times' deliberate choice to lead with that detail and only mention the former president's incoherence briefly in the article drew sharp criticism from media pundits." The Week criticized Associated Press and CNN over their coverage of the same answer at the event, saying that they had attempted to "impose sense where there is none" with headlines such as "Trump Suggests Tariffs Can Help Solve Rising Child Care Costs in a Major Economic Speech".
- Trump mentioned that, if elected, in his administration Robert F. Kennedy Jr. would work on "[investigating] what is causing the decades-long increase in chronic health problems and childhood diseases, including autoimmune disorders, autism, obesity, infertility, and more". The New York Times did not mention autism in its reporting of this portion of Trump's speech. Parker Molloy wrote in The New Republic that the mention of autism alongside Kennedy should be a red flag given his promotion of false theories linking autism and vaccines. In omitting mention of autism, Molloy says that "the Times took an obvious nod to a conspiracy theory and turned it into a normal-sounding policy proposal."
- CNN reported a Trump post on Truth Social as a straightforward news story about his agreeing to debate his Democratic opponent Kamala Harris. David Bauder wrote for the Associated Press that in reality the post "rambled on about the 'radical left' and 'fake news'".
- Many television and radio outlets covered a Trump speech in Wisconsin with a soundbite quote from him that "No parent should be forced to send their child to a failing government run school". The Washington Post instead used the headline "Trump mixes up words, swerves among subjects, in off topic speech". WBUR said: "Though the speech was ostensibly about school choice, it took Trump more than half an hour of speaking to get there. He first meandered through a confusing, and confused stream of consciousness that touched on his belief that Kamala Harris is a Marxist, that for some reason he wants to meet her father. He dropped a line about migrants being 'the real murderers', and a claim about how migrants are 'coming out of jails in the Congo'. He talked about Elon Musk and Venezuelan tar."
- Speaking in the context of undocumented migrants, in October 2024 Trump said he believed people who commit murder have "bad genes", a concept that Mediaite characterized as referencing eugenics. The New York Times published a headline reading, "In remarks about migrants, Donald Trump invoked his long-held fascination with genes and genetics". Other journalists sharply objected. Former New York Times journalist Andrew Revkin called it "headline lunacy", while former Chicago Tribune editor Marc Jacob said the Times was passing racism off as "a deep intellectual curiosity about genetics". Mehdi Hasan remarked, "the sanewashing of Trump continues."

=== Causes ===
Michael Tomasky of The New Republic told the On Point radio show that sanewashing is not a conspiracy or an act of collusion between Trump and the media. Rather, it happens because the normal conventions of campaign journalism do not account for candidates that do not stick to "a certain pattern and a certain norm" of speech. On the same show, host Meghna Chakrabarti explained that representing the various tangents of Trump's speech can be a challenge in a medium with time or space constraints, like a radio show or newspaper. The New York Times suggested that Trump's incoherent remarks receive little attention because of how common they have become. According to the Associated Press, the idea that journalists have become accustomed to things Trump says that they might find shocking from other politicians is termed "the banality of crazy" by political scientist Brian Klaas.

== Remedies ==
Rob Tornoe wrote in Editor & Publisher that one technique journalists can use to avoid sanewashing is the truth sandwich technique. Kelly McBride, writing for the Poynter Institute, listed various approaches, including to "let the quotes stand", to "point out the lies and also the purpose they serve", and to "identify the journalistic purpose" of a quote. Parker Molloy wrote in The New Republic that readers, not just journalists, also have some responsibility to help counter sanewashing. According to her, readers should "seek out primary sources", and "support news outlets that prioritize accuracy over access or the appearance of 'balance'." Michael Tomasky of The New Republic praised The New York Times for its in-depth October 6, 2024, piece analyzing Trump's speeches since 2015 with a focus on Trump's mental fitness, and advocated for continuing to focus on this story of mental acuity.

== See also ==
- -washing
- Brainwashing
- Overton window – Range of ideas tolerated in public discourse
- Prebunking – The process of debunking claims before they are made
- Reputation laundering – Use of positive actions to conceal unethical behavior
- Steelmanning – The opposite of a straw man argument
- Hasbara – Public relations work by the State of Israel
