= Whitewashing (communications) =

Sanitizing and hiding of undesirable qualities

Whitewashing is the act of minimizing or covering up vices, crimes or scandals, or of exonerating the guilty by means of a perfunctory investigation or biased presentation of data with the intention to improve someone's reputation.

== Etymology ==
Whitewash is a white paint or coating of chalked lime that can be used to quickly give a uniform clean appearance to a wide variety of surfaces, such as the interior of a barn. The first known use of the term is from 1591 in England, referring literally to the process of coloring a surface.

== Usage ==
In 1800, in the United States, the word was used in a political context, when a Philadelphia Aurora editorial said that "if you do not whitewash President Adams speedily, the Democrats, like swarms of flies, will bespatter him all over, and make you both as speckled as a dirty wall, and as black as the devil."

In the 20th century, many dictatorships, authoritarian and totalitarian states used whitewashing in order to glorify the results of war. For instance, during the Warsaw Pact invasion of Czechoslovakia following the Prague Spring of 1968, the Press Group of Soviet Journalists released a collection of "facts, documents, press reports and eye-witness accounts." Western journalists promptly nicknamed it "The White Book", both for its white cover and its attempts to whitewash the invasion by creating the impression that the Warsaw Pact countries had the right and duty to invade.

In the study of reputation systems by means of algorithmic game theory, whitewashing refers to the abandonment of a tarnished identity and creation of a blank one, which is more widely known in internet slang as sockpuppeting.

According to the Eastern Europe and Central Asia desk director for the International Federation for Human Rights, Ilya Nuzov, Russia is trying to whitewash the country's repressive Stalinist past. On August 30, 2021, Russian Foreign Minister Sergey Lavrov said that the "attacks" on the Soviet dictator Joseph Stalin are part of attacks on Russia's past and the results of World War II. Russian politician and former deputy of the State Duma Alexei Melnikov said that Lavrov "made an attempt to whitewash Stalin, which clearly, during the period of repressive measures carried out by the authorities, showed the kinship of the authorities with the Communist Party of the Russian Federation – the same Stalin admirers." Russian literary critic and culturologist Nikolai Podosokorsky noted that "the whitewashing of domestic ghouls only indicates that the current rulers feel a spiritual kinship with them."

== See also ==
- -washing
- Reputation laundering
- Setting up to fail
- The Commissar Vanishes
