= Humanewashing =

Misleading animal welfare claims

Humanewashing is the tactic of using misleading descriptions of the treatment of animals, especially in the production of animal products. The term is often applied in the context of labels on store-bought products, but has also been applied to other contexts such as zoos.

The term is often used by animal welfare and animal rights organizations. For instance, the ASPCA has criticized the label "cage-free" for chicken and turkey as humanewashing since they are still tightly packed indoors. Others have also called the label "free-range" a form of humanewashing since most of the animals stay indoors with limited access to the outdoors. Some lawsuits have been filed against individual companies for their alleged humanewashing labels and advertising. Most of these have resulted in private settlements.

== See also ==
- -washing
- Reputation laundering
