= Sportswashing =

Using sports to improve reputations

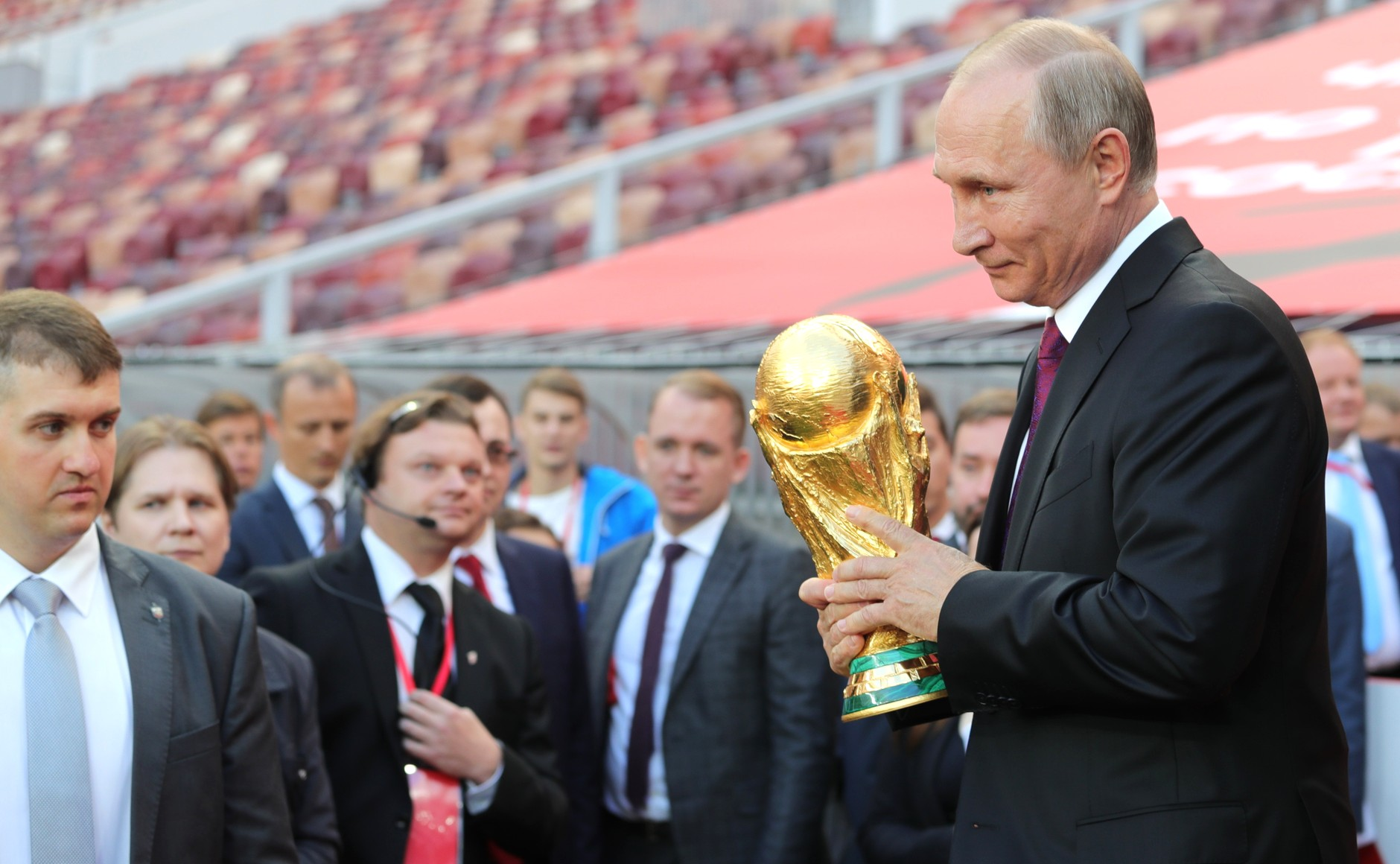
President Vladimir Putin holding the FIFA World Cup Trophy at a pre-tournament ceremony for the 2018 FIFA World Cup hosted in Russia

Sportswashing is a term used to describe the practice of governments, individuals or other groups to use sport as a means to improve their reputation by distracting or diverting attention away from activities considered by others as controversial or unethical. A form of propaganda, sportswashing can be accomplished through hosting sporting events, purchasing or sponsoring sporting teams, or participating in a sport.

At the international level, it is believed that sportswashing has been used to direct attention away from poor human rights records and corruption scandals. At the individual and corporate levels, it is believed that sportswashing has been used to cover up vices, crimes, and scandals. Sportswashing is an example of reputation laundering.

== Overview ==
Internationally, sportswashing has been described as part of a country's soft power. The first usage of the term "sportswashing" may have been applied to Azerbaijan and its hosting of the 2015 European Games in Baku.

There has been research regarding sportswashing and its connection to soft power as well. The idea behind sportswashing is that a country uses athletics in order to improve their image while soft power has a much broader scope than that of sportswashing.

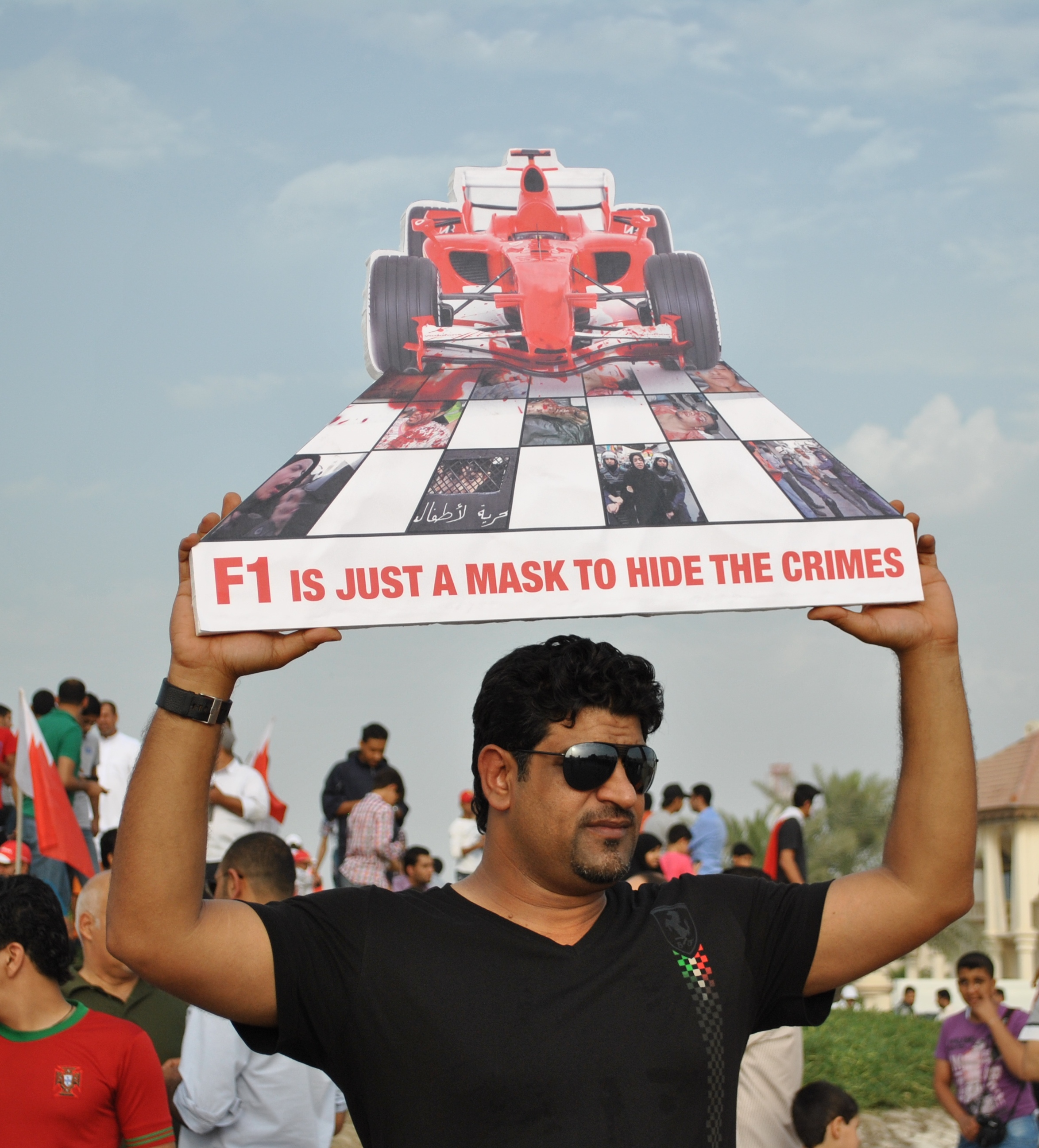
A Bahraini protester holding an anti-F1 sign in opposition to the 2013 Bahrain Grand Prix.

Gulf states accused of sportswashing have been the most vocal in attempting to dismiss these claims, often arguing that they simply want to enjoy sporting events in their home countries or attract new investments. These accused parties often say that sporting boycotts and event relocation are both unfair to sporting fans and are ineffective in changing government policy. In the case of Formula One, the league has even argued that "the sport is better able to effect change by visiting these countries and holding them to commitments they have made that are legally binding." The 2018 FIFA World Cup held in Russia has been cited as an example of a government's attempt to tackle the country's negative global reputation, which was low due to the Kremlin's aggressive foreign policy, with the sporting event attempting to redirect the international community's attention away from Russia's crimes and atrocities in Chechnya, Georgia, Syria, and Ukraine to the success of the World Cup.

Companies accused of sportswashing include Ineos's sponsorship of professional cycling's Team Sky (now the Ineos Grenadiers) in 2019, and Arabtec's sponsorship of Manchester City F.C.

A key characteristic of sportswashing is the very costly efforts parties must undertake as it is not just about getting the rights to an event but building the infrastructure to hold these games. For example, leading up to the 2022 FIFA World Cup the host country Qatar, the smallest country to ever host the World Cup, invested around $220 billion into luxury accommodations, expanded transport networks, and stadiums to prepare. In March 2021, human rights organization Grant Liberty said that Saudi Arabia alone has spent at least $1.5 billion on its own alleged sportswashing activities.

As a counterview, some academic observers have argued that the term sportswashing is sometimes used by some as an overly simplistic label to selectively critique foreign governments they oppose creating a double standard that masks their own political biases.

== Hosting ==
=== Basketball ===
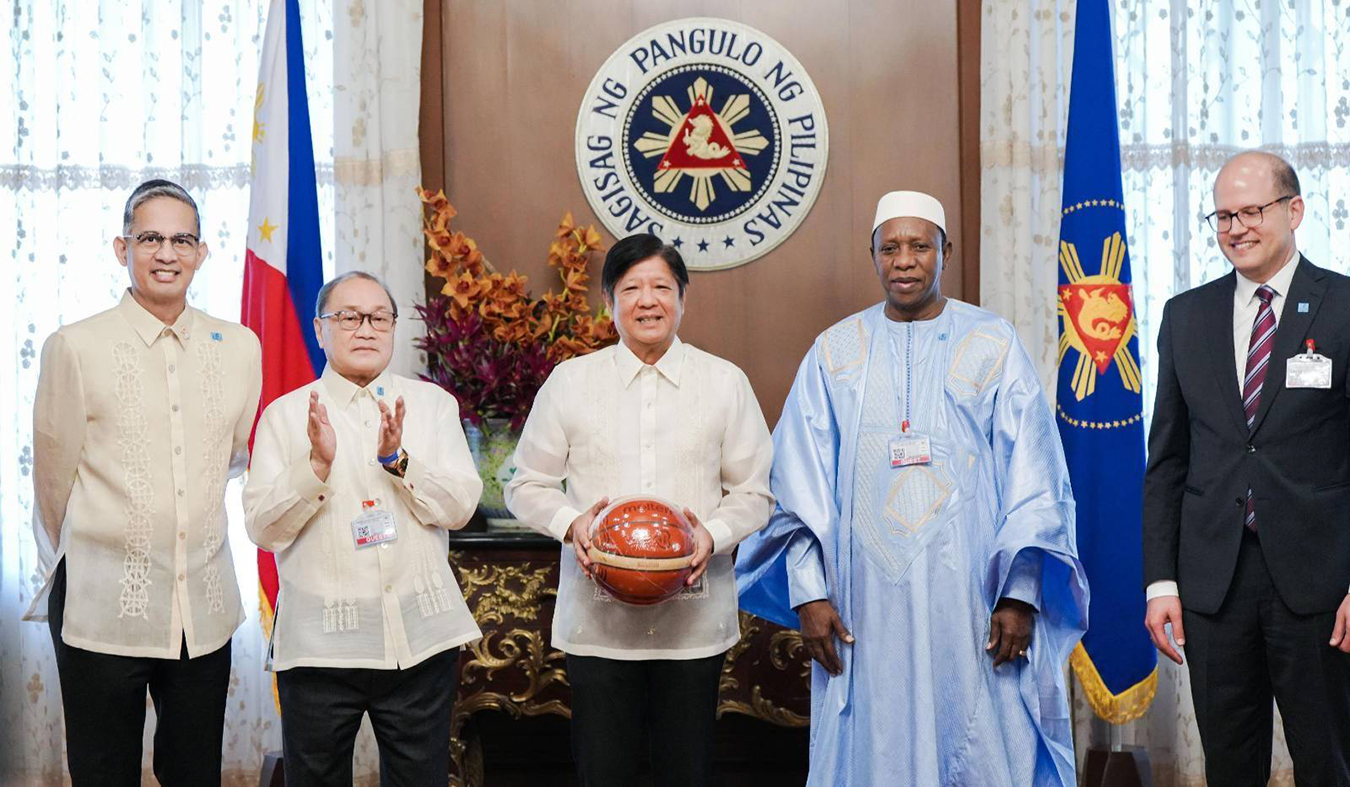
Philippine president Bongbong Marcos (center) in a courtesy call with members of the FIBA Central Board in April 2023 ahead of the 2023 Basketball World Cup draw.

- The 1978 FIBA World Championship held in the Philippines under the presidency of Ferdinand Marcos
- The 2013 FIBA Americas Championship held in Venezuela
- The 2021 BAL season held in Rwanda
- The NBA hosting pre-season games in United Arab Emirates since 2022
- The 2023 FIBA Basketball World Cup held partially in the Philippines under the presidency of Bongbong Marcos, the son of Ferdinand Marcos.

=== Combat sports ===
==== Boxing ====
- The 1973 light heavyweight boxing match between South African Pierre Fourie and American Bob Foster, held in Rand Stadium, Johannesburg, South Africa during the apartheid era
- The 1974 undisputed world heavyweight title match between George Foreman and Muhammad Ali, known as The Rumble in the Jungle, held in Kinshasa, Zaire (now Democratic Republic of the Congo) during the dictatorship of Mobutu Sese Seko
- The 1975 world heavyweight title trilogy match between Muhammad Ali and Joe Frazier, known as Thrilla in Manila, held in Quezon City, Philippines during the dictatorship of Ferdinand Marcos
- The 1980 WBA world heavyweight title match between Mike Weaver and Gerrie Coetzee held in Sun City, South Africa during the apartheid era
- The 2015 AIBA World Boxing Championships held in Qatar
- The 2019 world heavyweight title rematch between Andy Ruiz Jr. and Anthony Joshua, known as Clash on The Dunes, held in Diriyah, Saudi Arabia

==== Mixed martial arts ====
- Some UFC matches have been held in China, Russia, and the United Arab Emirates.
- PFL vs. Bellator
- PFL Super Fights: Battle of the Giants
- PFL 10 (2024)
- UFC on ABC: Whittaker vs. Aliskerov
- UFC Freedom 250

==== Wrestling ====
- RAF Moscow, held in internationally boycotted Russia during their ongoing war with Ukraine.

=== Cycling ===
- The 1960 UCI Road World Championships held in East Germany
- Tour of Qatar held in 2002–2016
- Tour of Beijing held in 2011–2014
- Dubai Tour held in 2014–2018
- Abu Dhabi Tour held in 2015–2018
- 2016 UCI Road World Championships held in Qatar
- Tour of Guangxi held since 2017
- UAE Tour held since 2019
- Tour of Oman held since 2020
- The 2025 UCI Road World Championships held in Rwanda

=== Association football tournaments ===
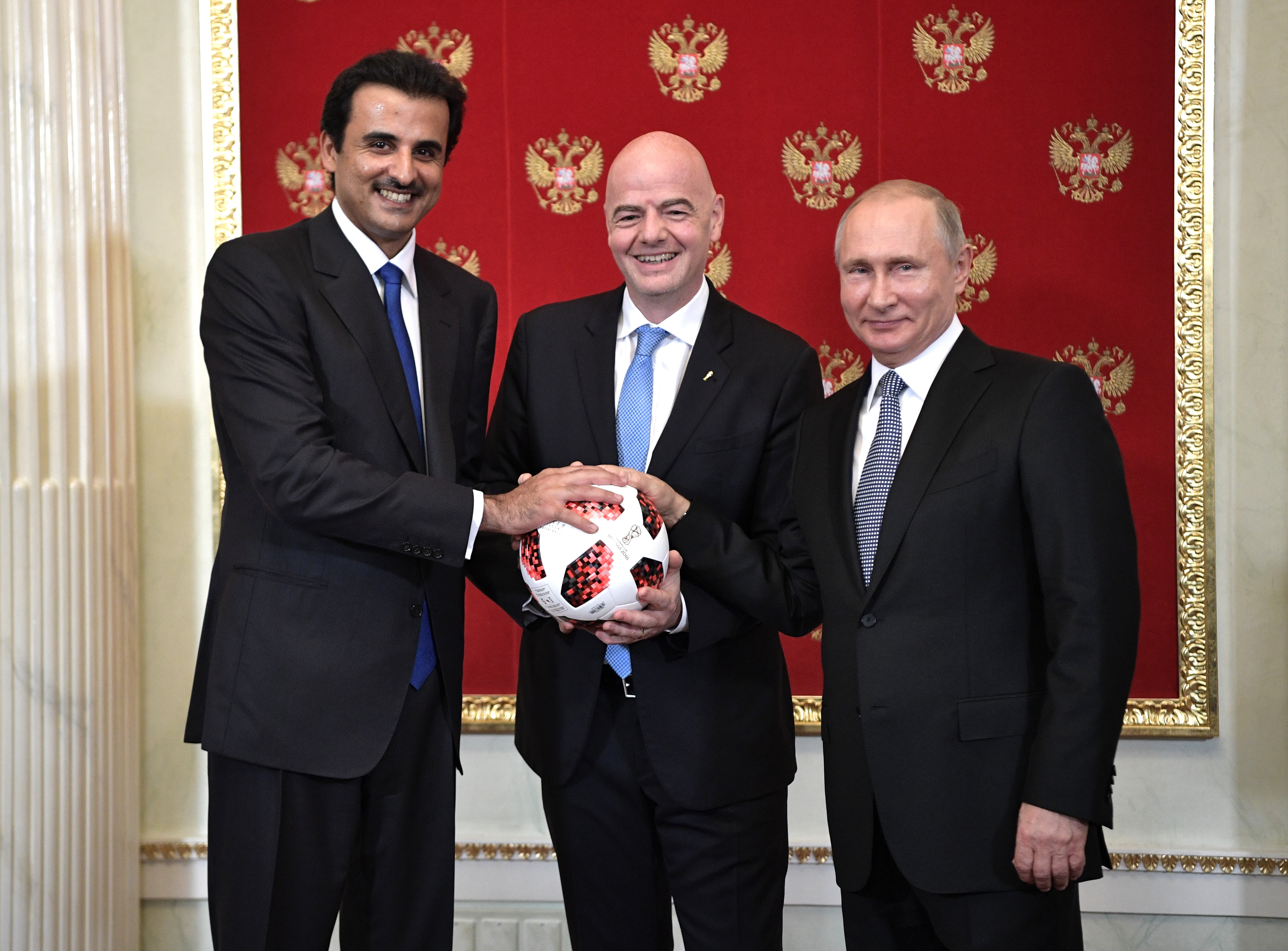
Russia handing over the symbolic relay baton for the hosting rights of the 2022 FIFA World Cup to Qatar in June 2018

- The 1934 FIFA World Cup held during the rule of Benito Mussolini in Italy
- The 1964 European Nations' Cup held in Spain under the dictatorship of Francisco Franco
- The 1978 FIFA World Cup held in Argentina under a military dictatorship led by Jorge Rafael Videla
- The 1988 AFC Asian Cup held in Qatar
- The 1995 FIFA World Youth Championship held in Qatar
- The 2002 Supercoppa Italiana between Juventus and Parma held in Libya under Muammar Gaddafi
- The 2004 African Cup of Nations held in Tunisia under Zine El Abidine Ben Ali
- The 2007 FIFA Women's World Cup held in China (initially awarded the 2003 bid but moved to the United States due to SARS)
- The 2007 Copa América held in Venezuela
- The 2011 AFC Asian Cup held in Qatar
- The 2013 Trophée des Champions between Paris Saint-Germain and Bordeaux held in Gabon
- The 2018 FIFA World Cup held in Russia
- The Supercoppa Italiana held two controversial football matches in Saudi Arabia:
  - The 2018 Supercoppa Italiana between Juventus and AC Milan held in Jeddah, Saudi Arabia
  - The 2019 Supercoppa Italiana between Juventus and S.S. Lazio held in Riyadh, Saudi Arabia
- The 2019 UEFA Europa League Final between Chelsea and Arsenal held in Azerbaijan
- The 2019 FIFA Club World Cup and the 2020 FIFA Club World Cup, both held in Qatar
- The Supercopa de España held football matches in Saudi Arabia:
  - 2019–2020 Supercopa de España held in Jeddah, Saudi Arabia
  - 2021–2022 Supercopa de España held in Jeddah, Saudi Arabia
  - 2022–2023 Supercopa de España, 2023–24 Supercopa de España, 2025 Supercopa de España and 2026 Supercopa de España, all held in Riyadh, Saudi Arabia
- The Euro 2020 held in 11 countries, including three with poor human rights record and them being viewed as authoritarian:
  - Group B, Group E, and quarter-finals held in Saint Petersburg, Russia
  - Group A and quarter-finals held in Baku, Azerbaijan
  - Group F and Round of 16 held in Budapest, Hungary during the second premiership of Viktor Orbán.
- The 2021 Diego Maradona tribute match between FC Barcelona and Boca Juniors, dubbed as "Maradona Cup", held in Saudi Arabia
- The 2021 Africa Cup of Nations held in Cameroon
- The 2022 FIFA World Cup in Qatar
  - The 2023 FIFA Women's World Cup; Saudi Arabia tried to be the sponsor, but after a series of outrages, it pulled out.
- The 2023 AFC Asian Cup held in Qatar (originally to have been held in China)
- The 2023 FIFA Club World Cup held in Saudi Arabia
- The 2025 FIFA Club World Cup held in the United States under the Second Presidency of Donald Trump
- The 2026 FIFA World Cup (mostly) held in the United States under the Second Presidency of Donald Trump and some political parties in Mexico during Claudia Sheinbaum's administration
- The 2027 AFC Asian Cup to be held in Saudi Arabia
- The 2030 FIFA World Cup to (partially) be held in Morocco
- The 2034 FIFA World Cup to be held in Saudi Arabia

=== Esports ===
"Esportswashing" is a term sometimes used to describe sportswashing which involves esports events.

- The 2019 BLAST Pro Series Finals held in the Kingdom of Bahrain
- Danish esports organization RFRSH Entertainment and Riot Games signed a deal to develop Saudi Arabia's NEOM project and boost esports in the region. Riot ended up scrapping the partnership after facing intense backlash from fans and their employees.
- The 2022 and 2023 Blast Premier World Finals held in Abu Dhabi, United Arab Emirates
- The Esports World Cup (EWC), formerly known as Gamers8, held annually in Riyadh, Saudi Arabia
- The Evolution Championship Series (EVO) was fully bought out by Saudi Arabia's Quiddya city project in February 2026, alongside announcements of plans to host future events in the country.

=== Golf ===
- PGA Tour China held since 2014
- China Tour held in 2014–2019
- Saudi International held since 2019
- Aramco Team Series held since 2020
- Aramco Saudi Ladies International held since 2020
- LIV Golf Invitational Series funded by Saudi Arabia's Public Investment Fund, beginning in 2022

=== Motorsport ===
==== Formula One ====
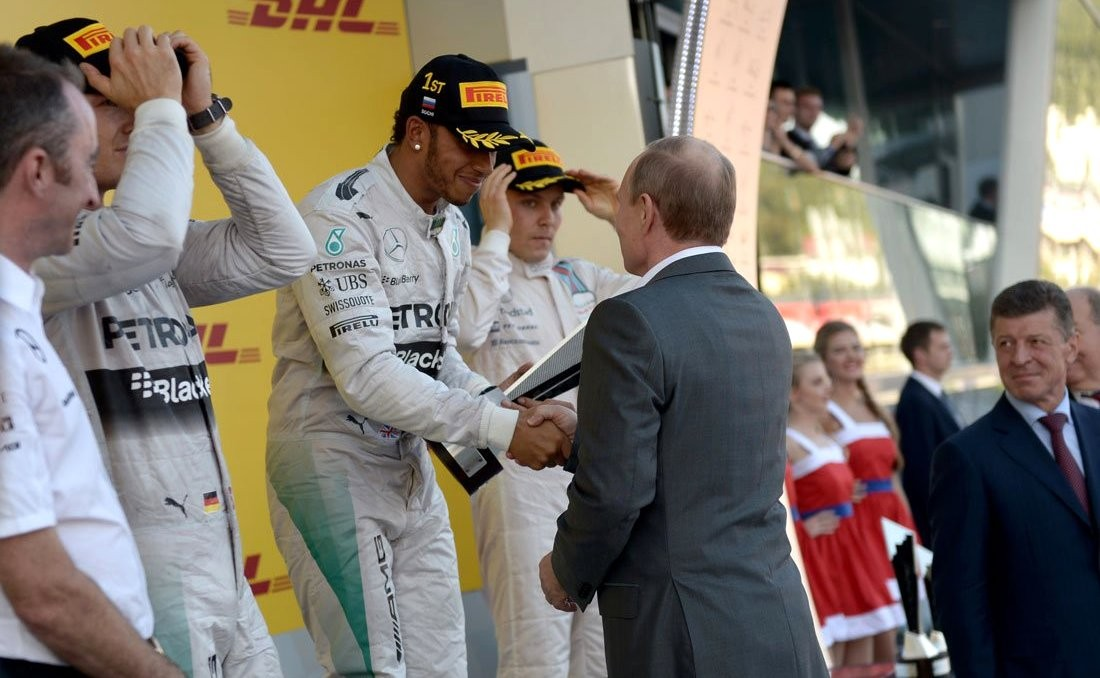
Russian President Vladimir Putin congratulates Lewis Hamilton, the winner of the 2014 Russian Grand Prix.

- Spanish Grand Prix held from 1951 to 1975 under Francoist Spain
- Argentine Grand Prix held from 1953 to 1981 under separate military dictatorships
- Portuguese Grand Prix held from 1958 to 1960 under Estado Novo
- South African Grand Prix held from 1960 to 1985 under apartheid
- Brazilian Grand Prix held from 1972 to 1984 under military dictatorship
- Malaysian Grand Prix held from 1999 to 2017
- Bahrain Grand Prix held since 2004
- Chinese Grand Prix held since 2004
- Abu Dhabi Grand Prix held since 2009
- Russian Grand Prix held from 2014 to 2021
- The 2016 European Grand Prix and the succeeding Azerbaijan Grand Prix held since 2017, held in Baku, Azerbaijan
- Turkish Grand Prix held in 2020, 2021, and from 2027 onwards
- Qatar Grand Prix held since 2021
- Saudi Arabian Grand Prix held since 2021 (Note: Race was not held in 2026 due to the Iran War)

==== Formula E ====
- Beijing ePrix held in 2014–2015
- Putrajaya ePrix held in 2014–2015
- Moscow ePrix held in 2015
- Diriyah ePrix held since 2018
- Sanya ePrix held in 2019

==== Grand Prix motorcycle racing ====
- Argentine motorcycle Grand Prix held in 1981–1982 under military dictatorship
- South African motorcycle Grand Prix held in 1983–1985 under apartheid
- Malaysian motorcycle Grand Prix held since 1991
- Indonesian motorcycle Grand Prix held in 1996–1997 under Suharto and since 2025 under Prabowo Subianto
- Qatar motorcycle Grand Prix held since 2004
- Thailand motorcycle Grand Prix held since 2018

==== Rally ====
- The Dakar Rally held in Saudi Arabia since 2020
- Rally Saudi Arabia held since 2025

==== Touring car racing ====
- FIA WTCR Race of Bahrain held in 2022
- FIA WTCR Race of Saudi Arabia held in 2022

==== IndyCar ====
- Freedom 250 Grand Prix in Washington D.C. held in 2026 after a Donald Trump executive order

=== Olympic Games ===
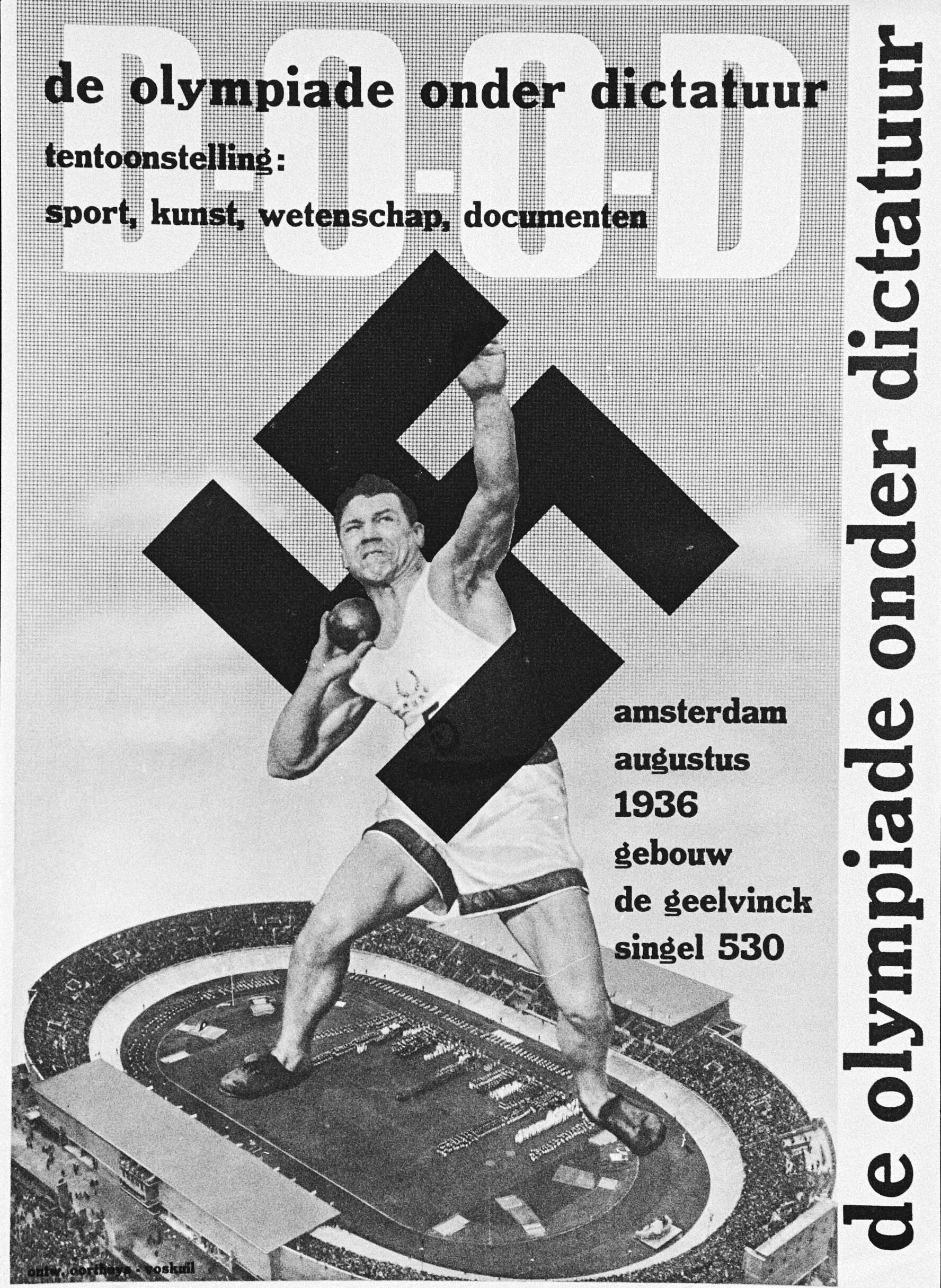
The Summer and Winter Olympic Games held in 1936 have been seen as sportswashing by Nazi Germany

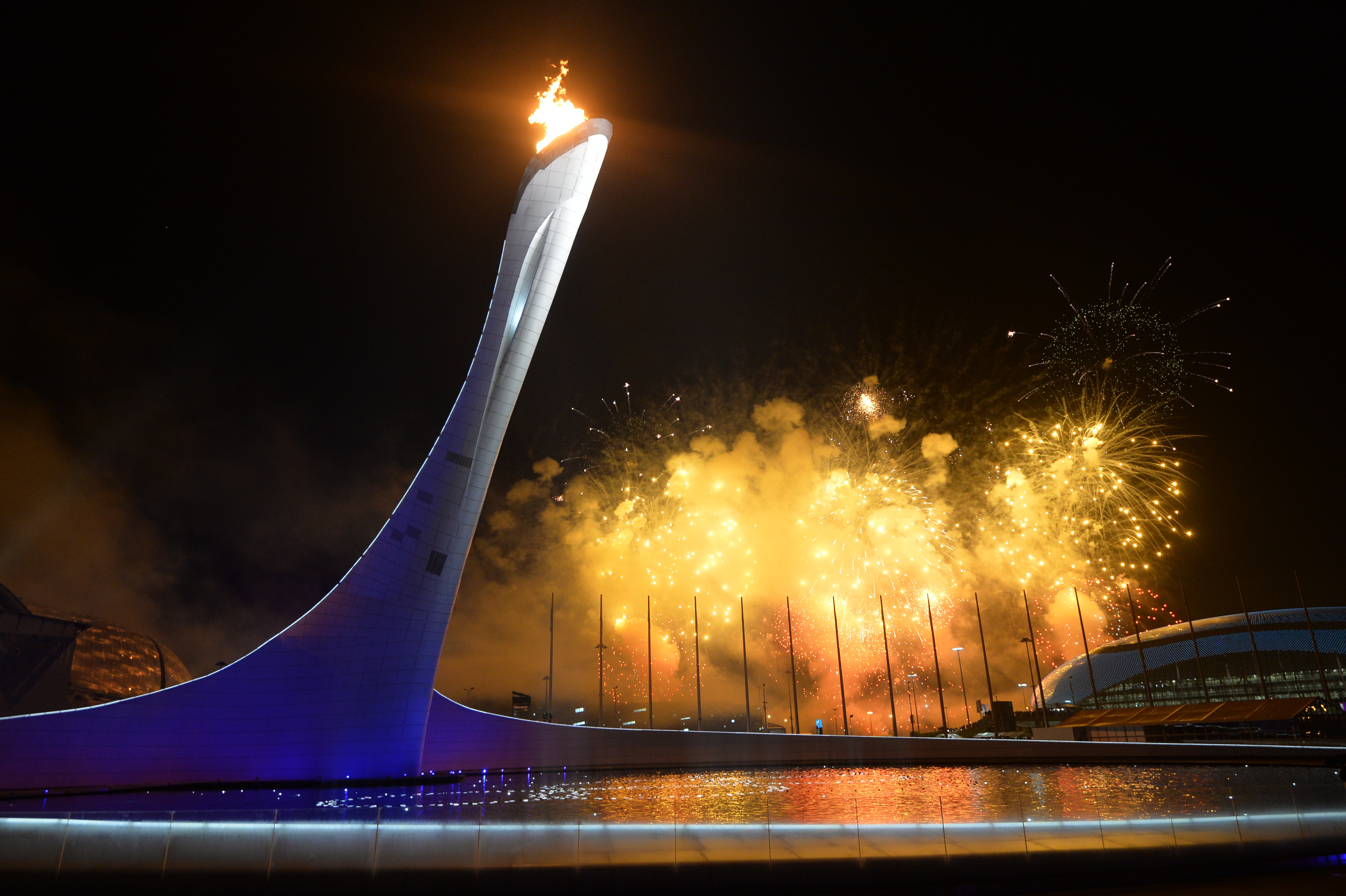
Fireworks over Fisht Olympic Stadium following the lighting of the Olympic Cauldron at the 2014 Winter Olympics

- The 1936 Winter Olympics held in Garmisch-Partenkirchen, Nazi Germany
- The 1936 Summer Olympics held in Berlin, Nazi Germany
- The 1968 Summer Olympics held in Mexico City, Mexico (specially after Tlatelolco massacre)
- The 1980 Summer Olympics held in Moscow, Russian SFSR, Soviet Union
- The 1988 Summer Olympics held in military-led Seoul, South Korea
- The 2008 Summer Olympics held in Beijing, China
- The 2014 Winter Olympics held in Sochi, Russia
- The 2022 Winter Olympics held in Beijing, China
- The inaugural Olympic Esports Games, planned to be held in Saudi Arabia in 2027

=== Rugby union ===
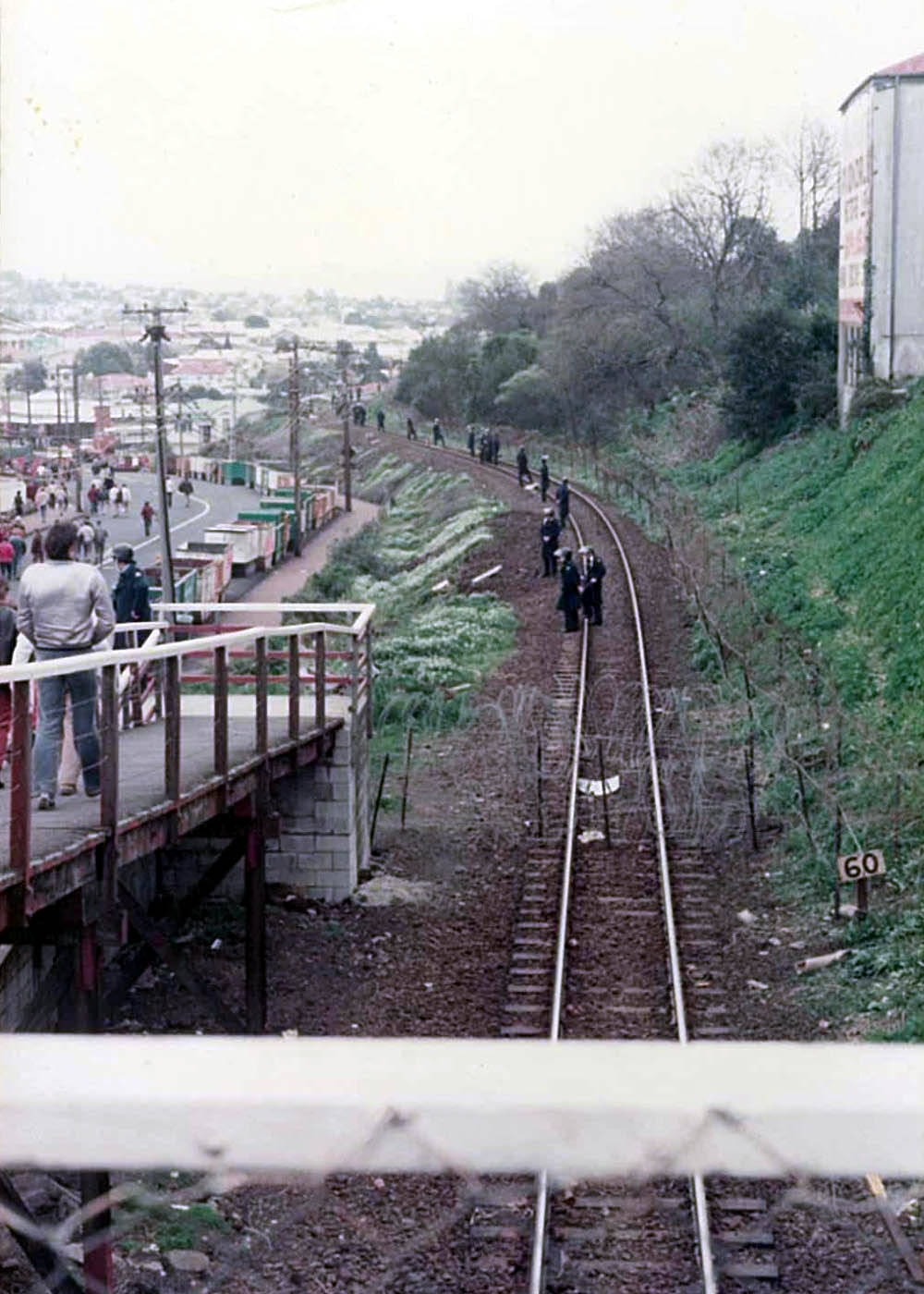
Police officers guarding a barbed wire perimeter around Eden Park near Kingsland railway station in New Zealand during the 1981 South African rugby tour

Rugby union tours involving South Africa during the Apartheid era:

- The 1949, 1960, 1970, 1976 New Zealand tours to South Africa
- The 1951–1952, 1960–1961, 1965, 1969–1970 South African tours to Britain and Ireland
- The 1952, 1961, 1968, 1974 South Africa tours to France
- The 1953, 1961, 1963, 1969 Australia tours to South Africa
- The 1955, 1962, 1968, 1974, 1980 British & Irish Lions tours to South Africa
- The 1956, 1965, 1971 South Africa tours to Australia
- The 1956, 1965, 1981 South Africa tours to New Zealand
- The 1958, 1964, 1967, 1971, 1975, 1980 France tours to South Africa
- The 1960 Scotland tour to South Africa
- The 1964 Wales tour to South Africa
- The 1965, 1971 Argentina tours to South Africa both with tests against the South African Gazelles
- The 1972, 1984 England tours to South Africa
- The 1973 Italy tour to South Africa
- The 1980 South African tour to South America
- The 1980, 1982 and 1984 South American Jaguars tours to South Africa
- The 1981 Ireland tour to South Africa
- The unofficial 1986 New Zealand tour to South Africa

=== Tennis ===
- South Africa Open during the apartheid period (1948–1994)
- 1972 Federation Cup held in apartheid South Africa
- 1974 Davis Cup held in apartheid South Africa
- Dubai Tennis Championships held since 1993
- ATP Qatar Open held since 1993
- WTA Qatar Open held since 2001
- China Open held since 2004
- Wuhan Open held since 2014
- Diriyah Tennis Cup held since 2019
- Next Generation ATP Finals held in Saudi Arabia between 2023 and 2027
- 2024 WTA Finals in Riyadh, Saudi Arabia
- 6 Kings Slam, 2024 in Riyadh, Saudi Arabia

=== Professional wrestling ===
- Collision in Korea held in Pyongyang, North Korea in 1995. A second event, in a smaller building, was promoted by Antonio Inoki (who promoted the first event as well) over two days in 2014
- WWE in Saudi Arabia from 2014; in particular, Saudi Arabia hosting two Premium Live Events each year (one under the name of WWE Crown Jewel) since 2018 including WrestleMania 43 in 2027

=== Other events ===
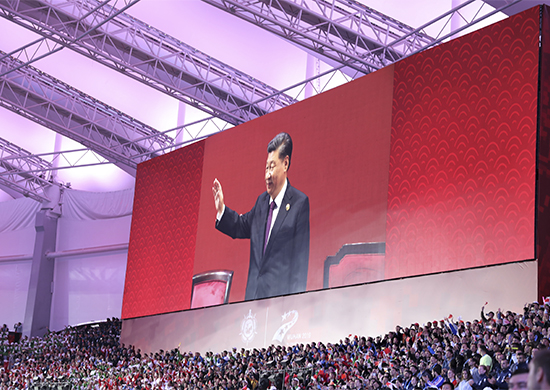
Paramount leader of China, Xi Jinping, attends the opening ceremony of the 2019 Military World Games in Wuhan, China.

- Proposed NFL games in China, including the China Bowl
- The 1973 All-Africa Games held in military-led Lagos, Nigeria
- The 1973 Summer Universiade held in Moscow, Russian SFSR, Soviet Union
- The 1978, 1982 and 1986 South American games held by dictators Juan Pereda, Reynaldo Bignone and Augusto Pinochet
- The 1979, 1987 and 1997 SEA Games held in military-led Jakarta, Indonesia
- The 1981 Summer Universiade held in Bucharest, Romania SR
- The 1981 SEA Games held in Manila, the Philippines under the presidency of Ferdinand Marcos
- The 1986 Asian Games held in military-led Seoul, South Korea
- The 1990 Asian Games held in Beijing, China
- The 1991 Pan American Games held in Havana, Cuba
- The 2001 Summer Universiade held in Beijing, China
- The 2006 Asian Games held in Doha, Qatar
- The 2007 Summer Universiade held in military-led Bangkok, Thailand
- The 2007 SEA Games held in military-led Nakhon Ratchasima, Thailand
- The 2010 Asian Games held in Guangzhou, China
- The 2011 Summer Universiade held in Shenzhen, China
- The 2014 Men's Ice Hockey World Championships held in Belarus
- The 2015 European Games held in Baku, Azerbaijan
- The 2017 Asian Indoor and Martial Arts Games held in Ashgabat, Turkmenistan
- The Women's World Chess Championship 2017 held in Tehran, Iran
- The 2019 Winter Universiade held in Krasnoyarsk, Russia
- The 2019 European Games held in Minsk, Belarus
- The 2019 Military World Games held in Wuhan, China
- The 2021 Summer World University Games held in Chengdu, China after a 2-year delay from its original dates
- The World Chess Championship 2021 held in the United Arab Emirates
- The 2022 Gay Games held in Hong Kong after a year delay from its original dates
- The 2022 Asian Games held in Hangzhou, China after a year delay from its original dates
- The 2024 World Masters of Snooker tournament held in Saudi Arabia
- The 2025 World Artistic Gymnastics Championships held in Indonesia
- The 2025 FIVB Men's Volleyball World Championship held in the Philippines under the presidency of Bongbong Marcos, the son of Ferdinand Marcos
- The 2027 Winter World University Games scheduled to be held in Changchun, China
- The 2030 Asian Games scheduled to be held in Doha, Qatar
- The 2034 Asian Games scheduled to be held in Riyadh, Saudi Arabia

== Corporate sponsorship ==
=== Association football ===
- Russian state-owned oil company Gazprom's sponsorship of the German Bundesliga football team Schalke 04, events of the UEFA Champions League, and kits. This contract was cancelled due to the Russian invasion of Ukraine in 2022.
- Russian holding company USM Holdings Limited's sponsorship of Everton F.C. The company is owned by Alisher Usmanov, a wealthy Russian oligarch, sanctioned by numerous countries for his close personal and business ties to the Russian government.

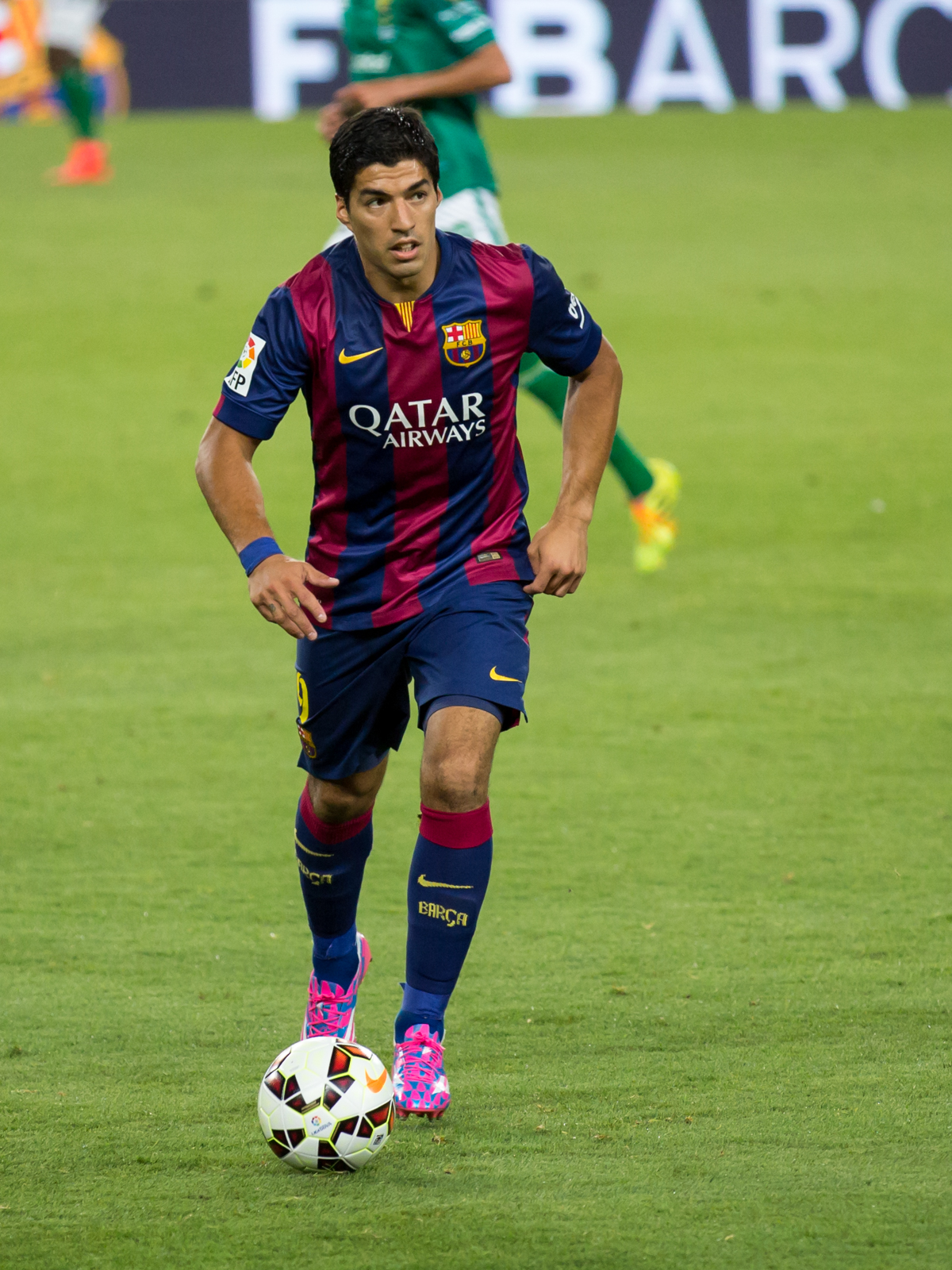
Luis Suárez wearing FC Barcelona jersey bearing Qatar Airways logo as sponsor

- Russian flag carrier Aeroflot's sponsorship of Manchester United. The sponsorship was ended following the Russian invasion of Ukraine in 2022.
- Qatar Airways' sponsorships of football teams, including FC Barcelona, A.S. Roma, Boca Juniors, Paris Saint-Germain, and Bayern Munich
- Qatar's Hamad International Airport's sponsorship of Bayern Munich from 2018 to 2023
- Bahrain's flag carrier, Gulf Air's sponsorships of Chelsea and Queens Park Rangers
- The Azerbaijan tourism authority's sponsorship of Atlético Madrid
- Hong Kong-based insurance company AIA Group's sponsorship of English football club Tottenham Hotspur. AIA Group endorsed the Hong Kong national security law in 2020, which was condemned by several British politicians who demanded that the club drop the sponsorship.
- The Rwanda tourism authority's sponsorship of Arsenal and Paris Saint-Germain.
- The Saudi Tourism Authority's sponsorship of the 2022 FIFA Club World Cup under the Visit Saudi branding.

=== Australian rules football ===
- Brunei's flag carrier Royal Brunei Airlines' sponsorship deal with AFL Europe in 2014. The sponsorship deal ended the same year after protests from rights groups.

=== Cycling ===
- Shell's major partnership with British Cycling in 2022

=== Golf ===
- Saudi Arabia's sovereign wealth fund, Public Investment Fund, sponsored the LIV Golf in 2021. Human rights organizations criticized Saudi Arabia for sportwashing its image through the tournament. Human Rights Watch also wrote a letter to LIV Golf urging the league to adopt a strategy that would minimize the risk of reputation laundering by the Saudi Arabian government.

=== Motorsport ===
- Venezuela's state-owned oil and natural gas company PDVSA sponsored Formula One driver Pastor Maldonado, who raced for Williams Grand Prix Engineering in 2011–2013 and Lotus F1 in 2014–2015. Among others, the PDVSA logo was publicly displayed on both teams' car decals during those periods.
- Citgo, an oil company owned by Venezuela's state-owned PDVSA, sponsors numerous NASCAR teams, including Wood Brothers Racing and Roush Racing. Citgo also sponsored individual drivers such as Milka Duno, who raced in the 24 Hours of Daytona, and E. J. Viso, who raced in the IndyCar Series.
- Chinese state-owned broadcaster CCTV's sponsorship of Jordan Grand Prix Formula One team in 2003
- Saudi Arabia state-owned oil company Aramco's title sponsorship of the Aston Martin F1 Team, as well as Formula One race sponsorship
- Saudi Arabian flag carrier Saudia's sponsorship of Formula One teams Williams Grand Prix Engineering from 1977 to 1984 and Aston Martin in 2023
- The Saudi Arabian backed Neom project's sponsorship of the Mercedes-EQ Formula E Team, and McLaren's Formula E and Extreme E teams
- Uralkali's sponsorship of the Haas F1 Team during the 2021 season. Uralkali also sponsored then Russian Haas driver Nikita Mazepin, the son of then Uralkali CEO and owner, and oligarch Dmitry Mazepin. Haas severed ties with Uralkali and Mazepin due to the Russian invasion of Ukraine in 2022.

== Ownership ==
=== Association football ===
Domestic teams:

- Italian media proprietor and politician Silvio Berlusconi, through his Fininvest holding, owned Serie A club A.C. Milan in 1986 and had 98% of the club's share until 2017. Berlusconi gained popularity in the country by leveraging his team's success, strongly supported by his own mass media, including Mediaset, to improve public opinion, which was useful for his political purposes. Berlusconi founded Forza Italia, a centre-right party, and in 1994 became Prime Minister of Italy. During more than two decades of government, divided into four periods, he was involved in abuse of office, bribery, corruption of public personnel, and false accounting cases, as well as sex scandals, among other controversies surrounding Berlusconi. He proposed and approved many ad personam laws (a type of clientelism) in favour of his own business, including the Milanese club as the Lentini affair in 1995, the Decreto Salva Calcio in 2003, which allowed Milan to be relieved its debt of € 242 million, and the decriminalisation of false accounting during the second Berlusconi government, a charge for which his club and local rival FC Internazionale Milano were tried and acquitted five years later due that measure; obtaining political support from the Milan fanbase, one of the largest in the country. In 2018, after he sold Milan to Chinese businessman Li Yonghong, Berlusconi, through Fininvest, owned AC Monza, a club that then competed in the national Serie C, with 100% of the club's shares.

Foreign ownership:

- Russian politician and businessman Roman Abramovich's ownership of Chelsea F.C. (2003–2022), which some have reported was done at the request of Russian President Vladimir Putin
- Russian pro-Kremlin businessman Alisher Usmanov formally owned partial shares of Arsenal F.C. Usmanov never had control of the club's day-to-day operation.
- Abu Dhabi has the majority ownership of City Football Group. In 2015, the Abu Dhabi United Group announced a consortium with Chinese state-owned CITIC Group for City Football Group, an entity which in turn owns:
  - Manchester City F.C. (since 2008)
  - Melbourne City FC
  - Montevideo City Torque
  - New York City FC
  - Yokohama F. Marinos (partially)
  - Girona FC
  - Shenzhen Peng City F.C. (partially)
  - Mumbai City FC (partially)
- Saudi prince Abdullah bin Musaid Al Saud's ownership of Sheffield United From 2013 to 2019 he owned 50% and later became its sole owner until 2024, when the club was purchased by COH Sports.

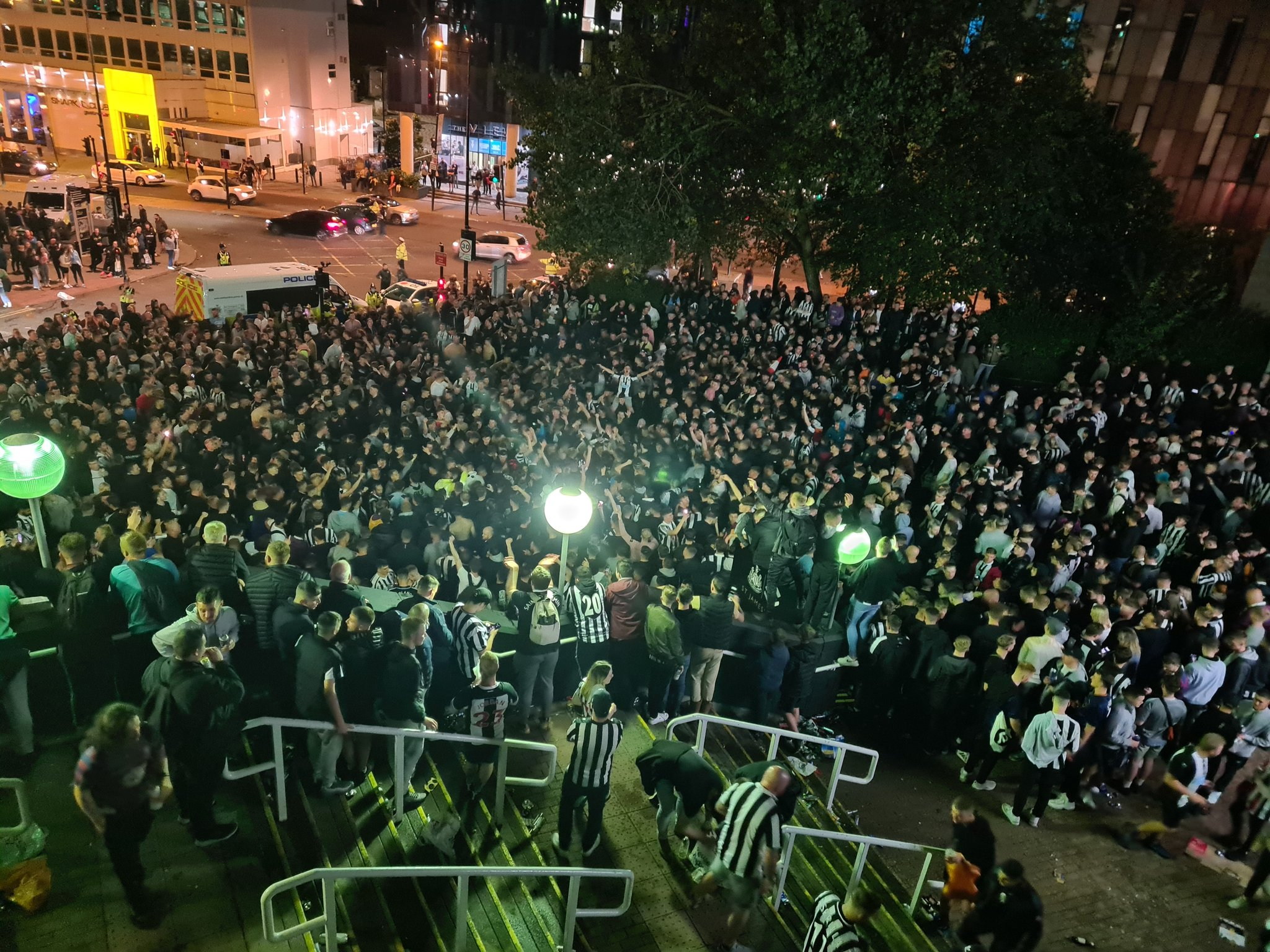
Newcastle United fans celebrate the completed takeover of the team outside St James' Park on 7 October 2021.

- The purchase of Newcastle United F.C., 80% financing provided by the Saudi Arabia Public Investment Fund. This was "a blatant example of Saudi sportswashing", according to Kate Allen of Amnesty International UK.
- Kingdom of Bahrain 20% stake purchase of French football club Paris FC. The purchase was condemned by French-based human rights NGOs.
- Tamim bin Hamad Al Thani, ruler of Qatar, purchased French football club Paris Saint-Germain (PSG) in 2011
- Washington Spirit's 2020 cultural exchange with Qatar

=== Basketball ===
- Russian businessman Mikhail Prokhorov owned the NBA team Brooklyn Nets. Prokhorov was known to be a close ally to Russian President Vladimir Putin. In 2017, Prokhorov sold the team; this was alleged to have taken place at Putin's request. Consequently, Hong Kong businessman Joseph Tsai bought the team in 2019. Tsai was previously criticized for his praise of China's restrictions on personal freedoms and for expressing his support of the Hong Kong national security law.

=== Cricket ===
- Indian fugitive businessman Vijay Mallya's ownership of cricket team Royal Challengers Bangalore, which competed in the Indian Premier League. Indian Enforcement Directorate accused Mallya ownership of the team to be part of Mallya's money laundering scheme.
- The South Africa national cricket team held numerous tours dubbed as South African rebel tours around 1982–1990, defying sporting bodies' sanctions of numerous South African sports teams for participating in international sporting events. The tours have been regarded as part of the apartheid government's sporting propaganda.
- In 2003, Peter Hain called for England to withdraw from a match against Zimbadwe describing the participation as "a propaganda victory" for Robert Mugabe. The England team raised concerns they would be expected to shake hands with Mugabe. Ultimately the team withdrew, citing security concerns.

=== Cycling ===
- There have been numerous reports that multiple authoritarian countries and questionable companies abused the 2020 Tour de France to sportswash their tarnished reputation; the following teams have been accused of sportswashing during the event:
  - Ineos Grenadiers
  - UAE Team Emirates XRG
  - Bahrain–McLaren

=== Motorsport ===
- Indian fugitive businessman Vijay Mallya's ownership of the Force India Formula One team. The Indian Enforcement Directorate accused Mallya's Force India team of being established for money laundering purposes.
- Kingdom of Bahrain state-owned sovereign wealth fund, Mumtalakat Holding Company, partial stake in McLaren Group, which includes its racing division, McLaren Racing, which competes in Formula One, Formula E, Extreme E, and IndyCar Series

=== Other ===
- The Al Maktoum family's ownership of Godolphin and Essential Quality
- The takeover of esports organizations ESL and FACEIT by Saudi Arabia's Public Investment Fund
- Donald Trump's ownership and management of multiple golf courses through the Trump Organization, some of which are outside the United States

== By individuals ==
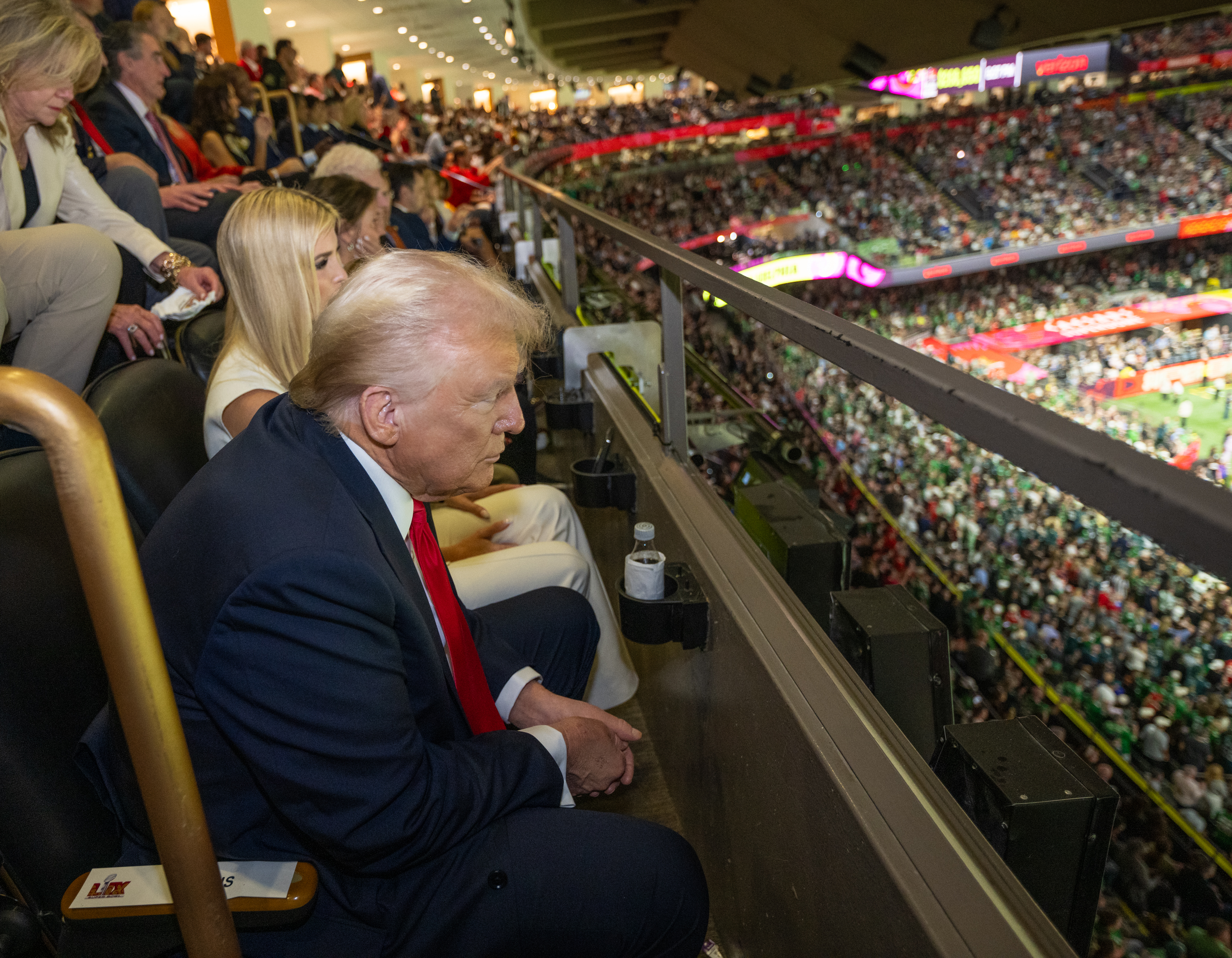
Donald Trump attending Super Bowl LIX a month into his second presidency

- Daniel Kinahan's involvement in boxing as a promoter
- Donald Trump has made multiple high-profile appearances at NFL and American college football games while serving as President of the United States, and in between his presidencies. He also attended Game 3 of the 2026 NBA Finals, becoming the first sitting president to attend the NBA championship series.
- Brother of Venezuelan PSUV politician and Bolibourgeoisie Jesse Chacón, Arné Chacón's ownership of stable in Florida called Gadu Racing Stable Corp and participation in horse racing in the United States.
- Chechnya's strongman Ramzan Kadyrov owns the horse Mourilyan, which competed in the Melbourne Cup. Australian Senator Bob Brown called for the Australian government to quarantine the prize money out of concerns about money laundering.
  - Kadyrov has also associated himself with UFC events, and has sponsored numerous Chechen fighters in the league.
- International Cycling Union presenting a certificate of appreciation to Turkmen dictator Gurbanguly Berdimuhamedow, "in development of sport and consolidation of universal peace and progress"

== By nations ==
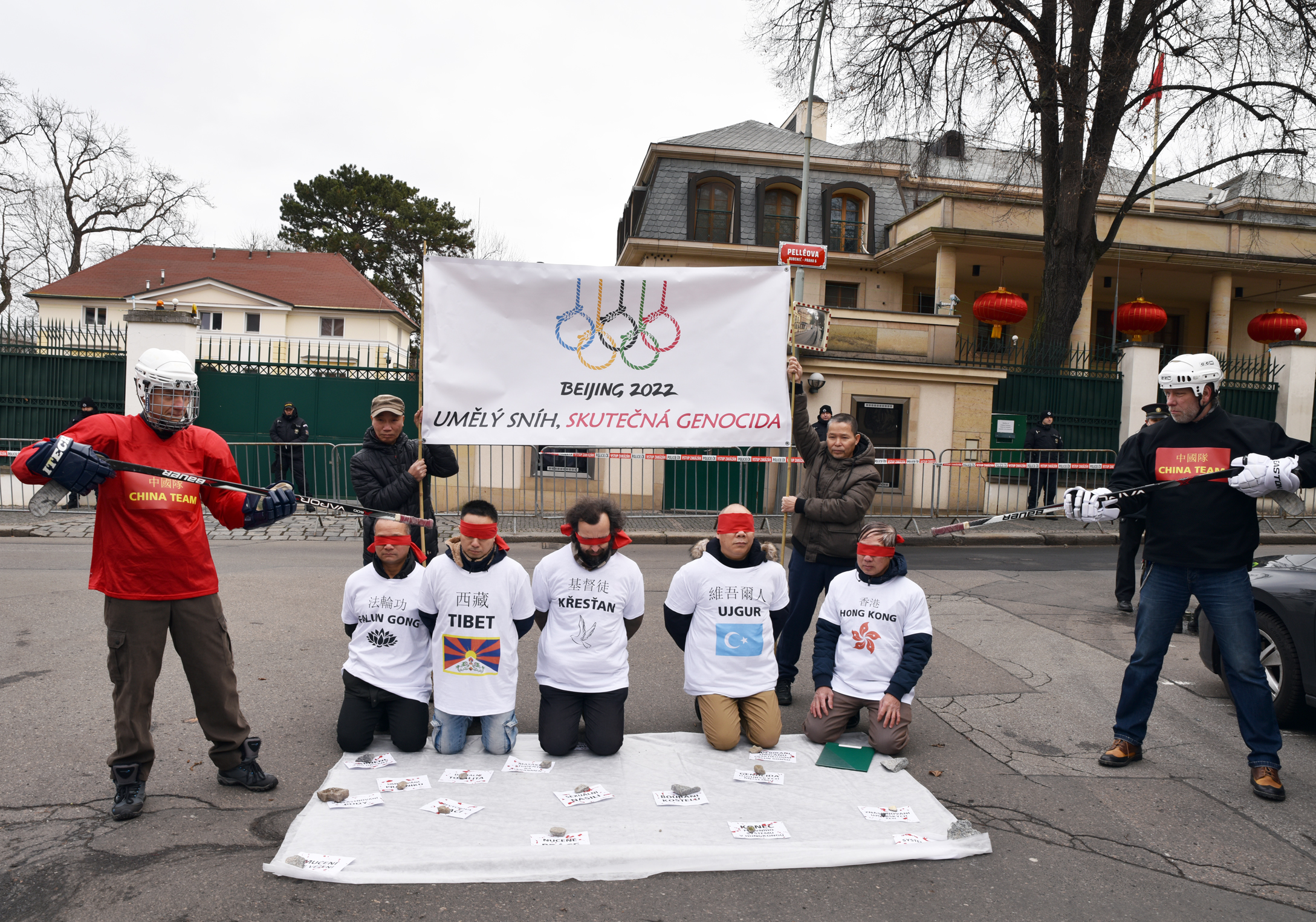
Protest in front of the Chinese embassy in Prague against the 2022 Winter Olympics in Beijing. The banner reads, "Artificial snow, real genocide".

- Kazakhstan joined UEFA in 2002 and has also sponsored numerous sporting events in recent years. Kazakhstan has been historically and sometimes still accused of being an authoritarian dictatorship due to its repression on dissidents and censorship of media, and that their UEFA membership association has also been under criticism as Kazakhstan has shared more commons with the authoritarian AFC than with more democratic UEFA due to the majority of Asian nations being authoritarian as contrast to European ones, which has gained headline after Kazakhstan become the first UEFA member after Belarus to send a national team (U-21) to play Russia since the invasion of Ukraine. Additionally, FC Astana, a football project launched by the autocratic government of Nursultan Nazarbayev to gain a foothold in Europe and justify its change of membership, was also seen as sportswashing. Recently, due to the impact of the Russian war on Ukraine, Kazakhstan has signalled contrasting claims, vowing to fight for UEFA membership, reportedly influenced by Donald Trump's "pro-Russian attitude", while reserving the possibility of exiting UEFA for AFC once more if "security guarantee" are not assured.
- Myanmar has recently been allowed to host the 2022 AFF Championship, and its clubs have been allowed to play home games in the 2023–24 AFC Cup despite grave human rights concerns in the aftermath of the Myanmar protests and massacres by the Tatmadaw on unarmed protesters. Additionally, the AFC is also accused of sportswashing in support of the Tatmadaw by denying the request of the Australian club Macarthur FC to play their away match against Burmese opponent Shan United F.C. in a neutral ground.
- UAE — In November 2021, the Emirates Culture and Tourism Department signed a multiyear partnership deal with the NBA, granting Abu Dhabi rights to host the preseason NBA games. Human rights groups questioned the deal, stating that the NBA was risking being complicit in the UAE's concerning human rights record. In February 2024, the NBA also signed a multiyear global marketing partnership with the airline Emirates, making the airline an inaugural title partner of the NBA Cup. Emirates also became the NBA's first-ever referee jersey patch partner. The league was questioned over the type of countries it was picking for alliance, including the UAE. The deals between the NBA and the UAE were criticized, citing the Emirates’ involvement in the Sudan civil war and its constant arms supply to the Rapid Support Force militia. Human Rights Watch stated that the UAE conducts high-profile sporting and other events in an attempt to portray an image of openness, while practicing a zero-tolerance policy.

== See also ==
- Panem et circenses
- -washing
- Politics and sports
- Potemkin village
- Reputation laundering
- Soft power
- Spin (propaganda)
- Sport sanctions
- Stadium diplomacy
