= Farmwashing =

Deceptive farm-related marketing practices

Farmwashing is a marketing or advertising strategy where a retailer (notably supermarkets) uses branding and imagery to suggest their produce is sourced from local small-scale family farms. This will often attempt to conceal the reality of large-scale industrial agricultural practices, reliance on imported goods, and low animal welfare standards. The term draws on the wider-known practice of 'greenwashing', used to misrepresent the environmental friendliness of products or services.

== Types of Farmwashing ==
Farmwashing can take various forms:

1. Fake farm brands: Retailers create fictional farm names and imagery to evoke traditional rural farms, when products often originate from large-scale industrial farming or are even imported from overseas.

“People are going into Tesco, purchasing Willow Farm chickens supplied by Avara, and not knowing that these products are potentially contributing to the destruction of this river. Fake farm brands give the sense of wholesome, small-scale production, masking the reality of industrial systems that produce so much of our groceries,” explains Rob Percival, Head of Food Policy at the Soil Association.

A Lexology report highlights how fictitious farm branding exploits consumers' trust in pastoral imagery, allowing retailers to obscure the actual origins of their products. These practices leverage regulatory gaps, particularly in the use of terms like “farm fresh” or “locally sourced,” to mislead consumers.

2. Misleading claims of farmer support: Retailers, including supermarkets, promote their support for local or small-scale farmers through publicised initiatives, but they are frequently accused by farmers of unfair treatment and business practices that drive family farms out of operation.

3. Masking product origins: Retailers sell products from different countries under a single farm brand name, subtly creating the impression that the majority of their products are homegrown or local.

== Origins of the term ==
One of the earliest uses of the term "farm-wash" appeared in The Washington Post in 2009, in an article highlighting the practices of the Founding Farmers restaurant chain. Referring to the mis-use of the term 'farm fresh', restaurant consultant Clark Wolf explained "Its called farm-wash. And the other term is B.S."

In 2011, the term was also highlighted by Grist in an article investigating Monsanto’s advertising practices. The article pointed out how the company portrayed itself as an ally to small farmers, despite its significant role in large-scale industrial agriculture. This was compared to Domino’s Pizza’s marketing campaign, which was criticised for falsely suggesting its ingredients were locally sourced and farm-fresh, as highlighted by CBS.

In the UK, Riverford Organic Farmers brought the term “farmwashing” into wider public use through their 'Farmers against farmwashing' campaign. This challenged the marketing practices of supermarkets, accusing them of using misleading imagery and branding - such as Union Jack flags and fictional farm names - to give consumers the impression that products came from small British farms. In reality, much of this produce was imported or mass-produced by large-scale agribusinesses.

== Media coverage and political awareness ==
The issue of farmwashing has gained significant media attention, driven by the 'Farmers against farmwashing' campaign, which has exposed misleading practices in UK supermarkets. This campaign not only attracted coverage from major outlets like The Independent and the BBC. Farmwashing was featured on BBC Morning Live on 5 November 2024 investigating Tesco’s use of fake farm names.

The issues highlighted have also attracted political attention including an open letter from 46 Labour MPs to the six largest UK supermarkets, demanding greater transparency and fairness in their marketing practices, and raised as a written question in the House of Lords by the Lord Bishop of St Albans, querying DEFRA on the impact of misleading supermarket branding on consumers and farmers, leading to a government response about reviewing food labelling regulations.

== See also ==
- -washing
