= AI washing =

Deceptive marketing tactic

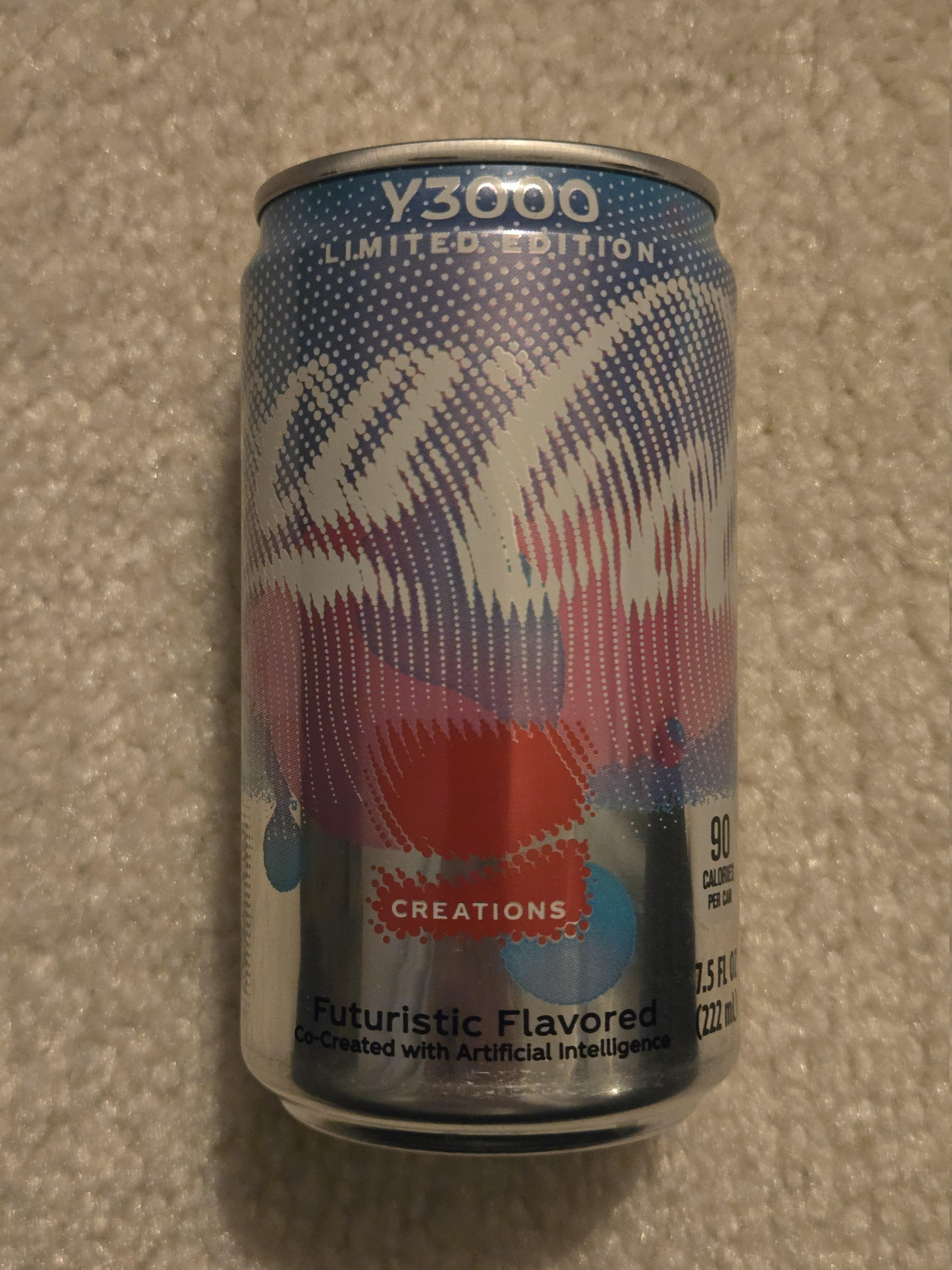
A can of Coca-Cola Y3000, the label saying that the drink was "Co-Created with Artificial Intelligence"

AI washing is a deceptive marketing tactic that consists of promoting a product or a service by overstating the role of artificial intelligence (AI) and the integration of it. Companies often involve in the practice to mislead customers to boost their offerings, and to secure funding from investors. The practice raises concerns regarding transparency, and legal issues.

== Definition ==
AI washing is a deceptive marketing practice. It involves promoting a product or a service by overstating the role of artificial intelligence (AI) and its integration in the design and manufacture of the same. The practice raises concerns regarding transparency, compliance with security regulations, and consumer trust in the AI industry potentially hampering legitimate advancements in AI. The term was first defined by the AI Now Institute, a research institute based at New York University in 2019. The term is derived from greenwashing, another deceptive marketing technique that misrepresents a product's environmental impact in a similar manner. AI washing might involve a company claiming to have used AI in the development or enhancement of its products or services without its actual involvement, or using buzzwords such as "smart" or "AI-powered" without the product actually offering it or making use of it. A company may overstate the usage of AI or misuse the term, which is also construed as AI washing.

In 2026, The Washington Post defined AI washing as "a trend for bosses to blame layoffs on the productive capabilities of AI and its ability to replace workers, even when job cuts may have little to do with the technology".

== Usage and effects ==
AI washing can lead to deception of customers and misleading of investors. It is also an illegal and unethical practice that lacks transparency regarding disclosing the details of a product or a service. Companies get involved in such a practice often in response to competition who might have used AI in their offerings. It might also be used as a ploy to secure funding and investment, assuming that it will attract them towards it. AI washing has been compared to dot-com bubble, when businesses appended "dot-com" to the end of the business name to boost their valuation.

In September 2023, Coca-Cola released a new product called Coca-Cola Y3000, and the company stated that the Y3000 flavor had been "co-created with human and artificial intelligence". The company was accused of AI washing due to the lack of proof of AI involvement in the creation of the product, and critics believed that AI was used as a way to grab consumer attention more than it was used in the actual product creation.

In 2026, some technology companies faced accusations of "AI washing" for attributing layoffs to AI-driven productivity gains when the workforce reductions may instead have been motivated by cost-cutting and efforts to improve profitability.

== Mitigation ==
Companies are expected to be transparent and clearer in communicating the usage of AI in their products or services. Consumers can mitigate the same by requesting hard evidence from the companies regarding the usage of AI tools. Customers should evaluate the product or service as a whole rather than being swayed by the usage of AI. Informed decision making and purchasing can keep them from falling for such marketing gimmicks. The United States Securities and Exchange Commission (SEC) imposes penalties for companies indulging in such practices. In March 2024, the SEC imposed the first civil penalties on two companies for misleading statements about their use of AI, and in July 2024, it charged a corporate executive from a supposed AI hiring startup with fraud for the usage of buzzwords related to AI.

== See also ==
- -washing
- AI bubble
- .ai
- vaporware
