= Bluewashing =

Deceptive marketing over social practices

Bluewashing is a deceptive form of marketing that overstates a company's commitment to responsible social practices. The term has similar connotations to greenwashing, but has a greater focus on economic and community factors. Alternatively, it could be phrased in a way that companies hide the social damage that their policies have caused.

Active disinformation is a tool that companies use to make their goods or services more attractive to their consumers and shareholders.

== Terminology ==
=== Bluewashing vs. Greenwashing ===
Bluewashing and greenwashing are both deceptive advertising practices performed by a company or organization that impact consumer trust. Bluewashing has generally been accepted to be a spin on greenwashing with a greater focus on social and economic responsibility, but the actual definition varies in different academia. Greenwashing is defined as the practice by which a company or organization presents its marketing products as more eco-friendly than the products actually are. Bluewashing is generally defined as the practice by which a company or organization overstates their social responsibility to appear better and hide their false claims.

=== Origin of the Term ===
Bluewashing was first used in relation to the United Nations and their July 2000 Global Compact. A report found that 40% of corporate members who volunteered for the compact did not use its ten principles to make any policy reforms. The compact is non-binding, and the United Nations has publicly stated that it does not have the resources to monitor the bodies who are supposedly participating in it. Therefore, concerns were raised that participating companies were using the compact as a way to "blue wash" their reputation aka improve public perception of their morals without legitimately introducing any policy reforms. The companies who joined were accused of using the United Nations' "excellent social reputation" to improve their own standing. The word blue was inspired by the colour of the United Nations' flag.

Other interpretations have been made in the digital domain. Van Dijk and co-authors use the term in the context of human rights such as privacy. Bluewashing here refers to the minimal instrumental use by organizations of supposed right-protecting measures like privacy by design without adequate checks, in order to portray themselves as more privacy-friendly than is factually justified. The colour blue refers to first-generation human rights as civic and political freedoms, often called blue rights, which can be contrasted with second-generation economic, social and cultural rights called red rights, and third-generation environmental rights called green rights (see three generations of human rights). Luciano Floridi uses the term in the context of ethics and also defines it as a digital alternative to its counterpart, greenwashing. He describes bluewashing as a form of misinformation that deceives consumers into thinking a corporation is more digitally ethical than it actually is. This is usually achieved by vague or unsubstantiated claims in a company's advertisements. The key example given is that of an AI; he notes that in many cases, it would be cheaper to persuade people that an AI meets ethical considerations rather than legitimately ensuring the AI meets them.

== Consumer impact ==
The impact of bluewashing is markedly similar to the impact of greenwashing. Ensuring that consumers believe that a company is ethically and morally responsible raises a positive attitude toward the company. This can result in increased consumer loyalty, higher market shares and a willingness to pay higher prices for their products. However, the presence of bluewashing and greenwashing has been linked with an increase of consumer distrust. Consumers are becoming increasingly aware of the deceptive marketing practices, which can lead them to automatically doubt claims of social responsibility. When a company participates in the practice of bluewashing, consumers become skeptical of their claims, and they have a difficult time fully trusting the company again. Consumers also become confused, and they have trouble making informed choices. They often times try not to support companies that participate in this type of bluewashing behavior.

== Societal impact ==
As bluewashing consists of false or misleading claims, instances of it have the potential to obscure the true facts of a situation. For example, bluewashing gives companies the opportunity to create pollution while blaming it on the public, which overall makes it more difficult for society to fix this pollution in their environment.

== See also ==
- -washing
