= Donald Trump and American football =

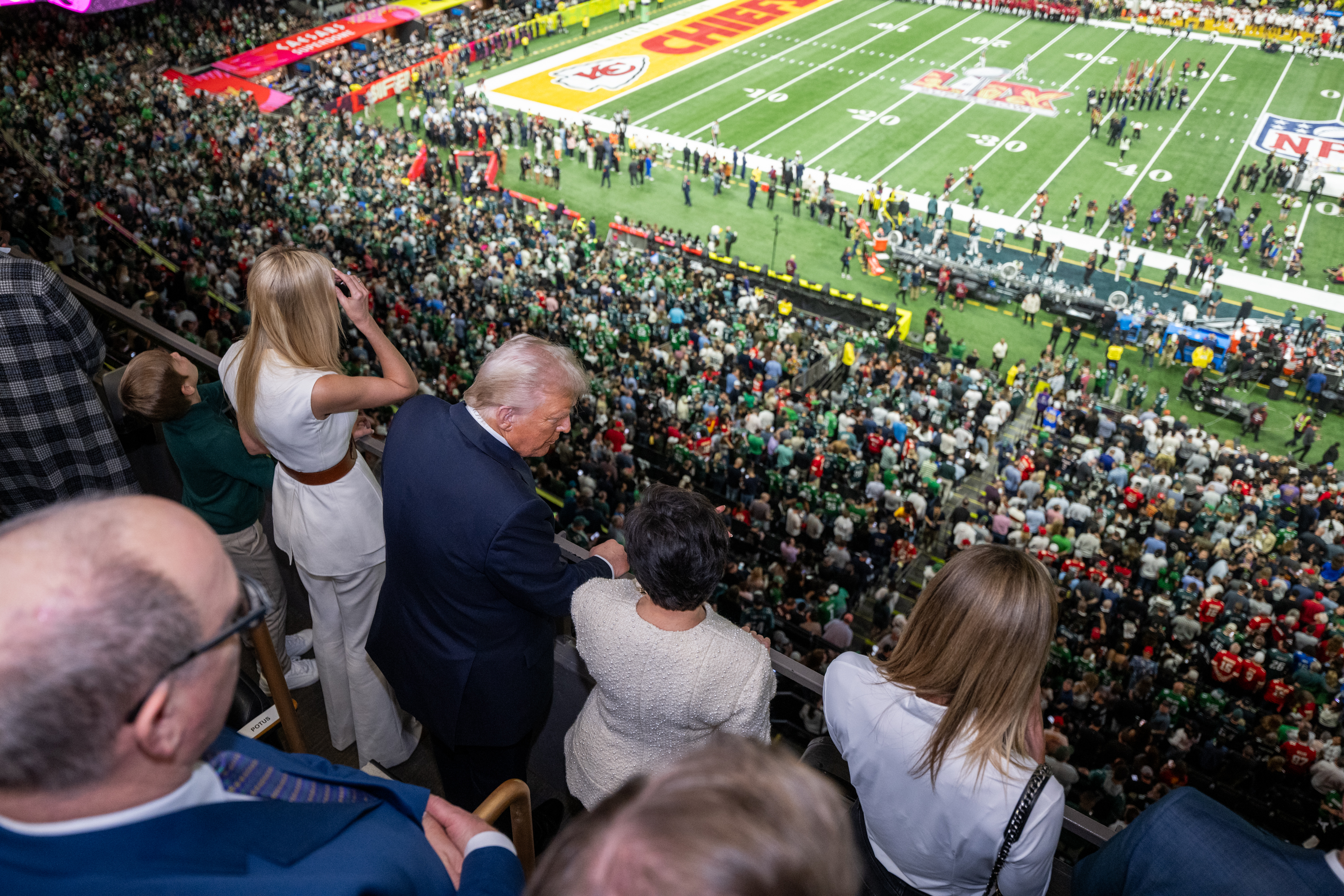
Trump attending Super Bowl LIX at Caesars Superdome in New Orleans

During his career as a businessman and politician, Donald Trump has had a noted relationship with the sport of American football, both at the professional and collegiate levels. Since the 1980s, he has had a strained relationship with the National Football League (NFL), the largest professional American football and sports league in the world. A 2018 article in Business Insider labeled Trump's relationship with the league "The Pigskin War", calling the NFL "his oldest rival". That same year, sportswriter Adam Schefter of ESPN stated that Trump has "his own little vendetta against the NFL", while Ed Malyon, the sports editor of The Independent, stated in 2019 that, "Trump has long waged war against the NFL".

Starting in the 1980s, Trump has tried on numerous occasions to become an owner of an NFL team including attempts to purchase the then-Baltimore Colts, New England Patriots, and Buffalo Bills, though he has never succeeded in his bids. In the mid-1980s, Trump became the team owner of the New Jersey Generals in the rival United States Football League (USFL) and led the league in a lawsuit against the NFL to attempt to force a merger. The USFL won a pyrrhic victory in the lawsuit, though without a merger or a substantial financial victory. Trump's actions have been widely seen as a major factor in the dissolution of the USFL shortly thereafter. During his first presidency, Trump called for a boycott of the NFL over the U.S. national anthem kneeling protests that many players were participating in, with some analysts viewing Trump's comments as part of his continued feud with the NFL.

As president, Trump attended several high-profile college football games, primarily in the Southern United States, where he was often well received by attendees. Nicholas Sarantakes, a historian from the Naval War College, compared Trump's fandom of the sport and his use of attending games as a form of political theatre to fellow president Richard Nixon's. According to a 2018 article in The Hill, Trump favored college athletics during his time in office due to his high-profile feud with athletes and associates in professional sports leagues such as the NFL and the NBA. In 2025, Trump became the first sitting U.S. President to attend a Super Bowl game during Super Bowl LIX.

== Professional gridiron football ==
=== Attempted purchase of the Baltimore Colts ===
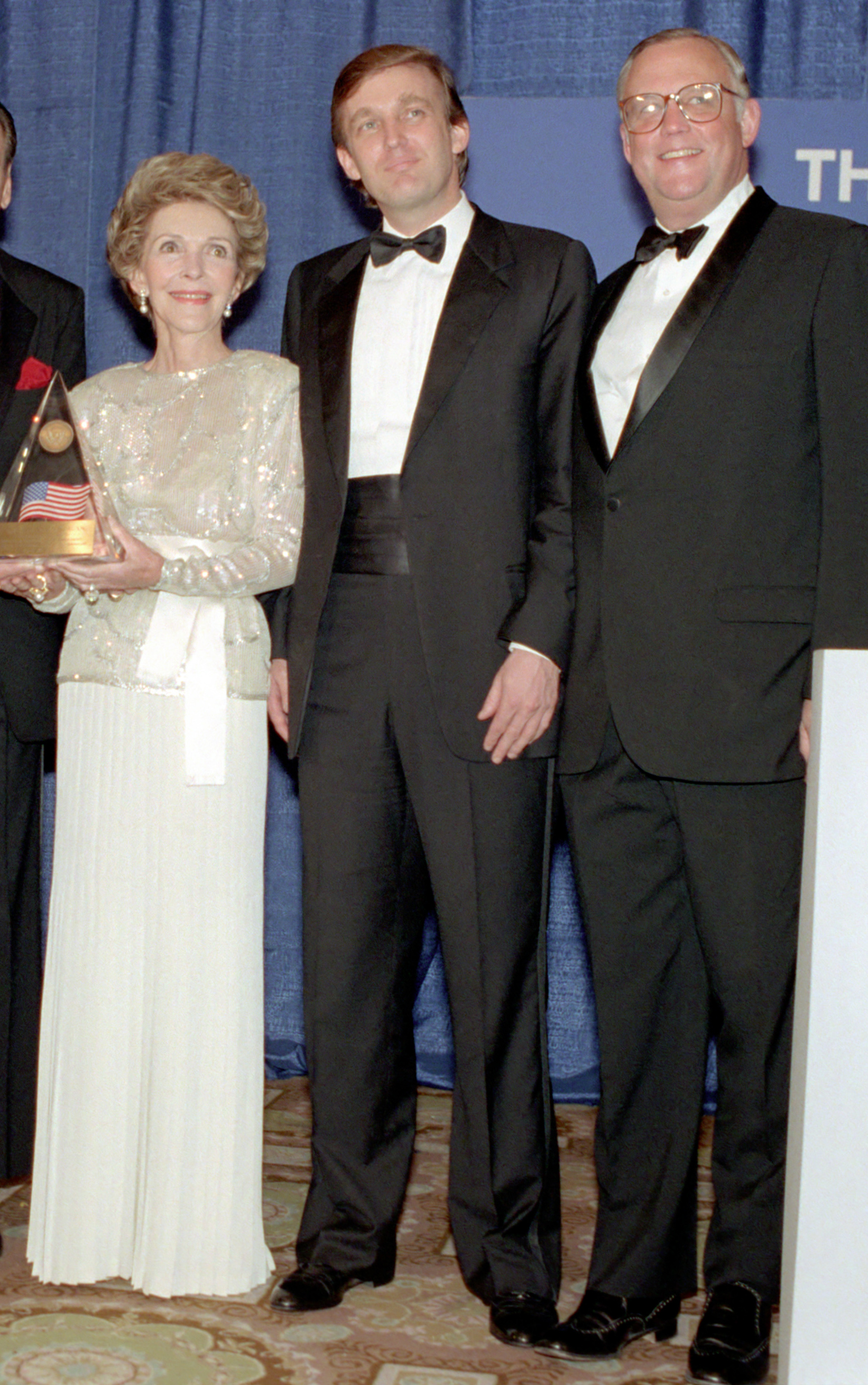
Trump and George Allen (right) were part of a group that sought to purchase the Baltimore Colts in 1981.

Trump's first attempt to purchase a team in the National Football League (NFL) occurred in 1981 when he sought ownership of the Baltimore Colts. At the time, team owner Robert Irsay had stated that he was considering either relocating the team to another city or selling it. Trump led a group that offered Irsay $50 million (equivalent to $177 million in 2025) for the franchise, though the offer was ultimately rejected. According to The Evening Sun, the group had consisted of six members, including Trump, with former Washington Redskins coach George Allen as the "front man". Allen's son (also named George) confirmed the involvement of both his father and Trump in the attempted purchase, saying, "I think my father may be involved because he is the one with the football wherewithal. Trump may want a team and the money to do it, and George Allen has the knowledge on how to do it". However, Trump denied any involvement in the purchase, telling the Sun that, "I have not given any offers for the team. Neither was I part of a group that did". However, multiple news sources maintain that Trump was involved in the attempted purchase, as does sportswriter Jeff Pearlman. Additionally, NFL Commissioner Pete Rozelle stated in 1986 that Trump had attempted to purchase the Colts. Trump denied this and instead stated that Rozelle had attempted to woo him into buying the team.

==== Later interest ====
In 1983, Trump again expressed interest in purchasing the Colts from Irsay, who was still considering relocating the team from Baltimore. In a 1986 court case, Irsay stated that he had told Trump, through an intermediary, that "it was a waste of time to try to buy the Colts. At least two other groups were trying to buy control of the Colts". Ultimately, Irsay remained the owner of the Colts and relocated the team in March 1984, after which they became the Indianapolis Colts.

=== Interest in purchasing the Dallas Cowboys ===
In 1984, Dallas Cowboys founder and owner Clint Murchison Jr. stated his intent to sell the team. Trump expressed interest in acquiring the team for $50 million (equivalent to $155 million in 2025), but ultimately declined. Explaining his rationale for not buying the team, Trump stated in an interview with Ira Berkow of The New York Times, "I feel sorry for the poor guy who is going to buy the Dallas Cowboys. It's a no-win situation for him, because if he wins, well, so what, they've won through the years, and if he loses, which seems likely because they're having troubles, he'll be known to the world as a loser". Additionally, Trump did not believe there was much room to generate profit given the price. Instead, Trump believed that buying a team in the newly founded United States Football League (USFL) would yield a much higher return on investment for a lower purchase cost. Several news sources have called Trump's decision to not buy the Cowboys for $50 million to be a business blunder, as the franchise would go on to be first on Forbes' list of the most valuable sports teams, with a 2024 valuation of $10.1 billion.

==== Later interest ====
In October 1988, The Boston Globe reported that Trump was again interested in purchasing the Cowboys and that reporters stated that former Cowboys player Roger Staubach might be involved with Trump's efforts. However, the Cowboys were ultimately purchased by Jerry Jones in 1989.

=== Purchase of the New Jersey Generals ===
==== USFL inaugural season ====
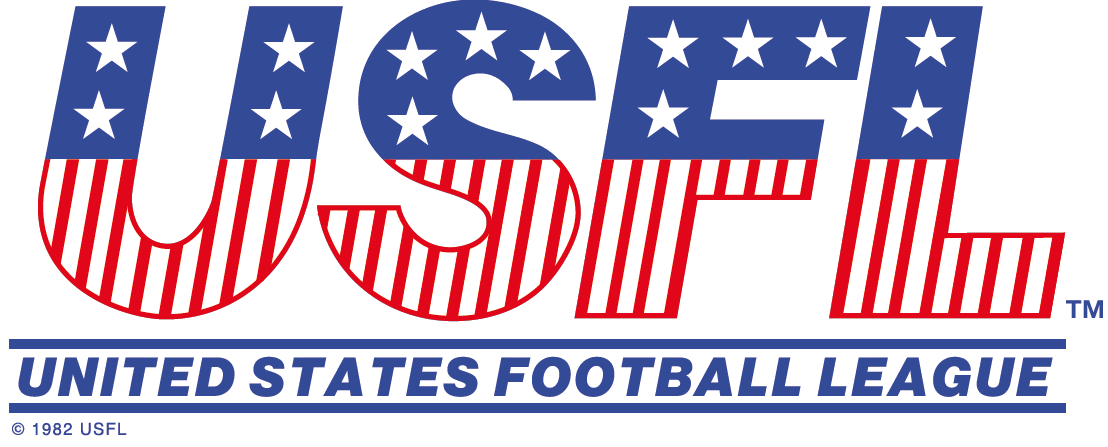
Logo of the United States Football League

In 1982, the USFL announced that it would begin play the following year, with games to take place in the spring and summer to avoid competing directly with the NFL, whose season ran through fall and winter. In the leadup to their first season, league executives were planning which cities would receive franchises and were adamant that at least one team be based in the New York metropolitan area. Trump expressed interest in being the owner of that franchise, but after some discussions, he declined, and instead the franchise, called the New Jersey Generals, came under the ownership of Oklahoma businessman J. Walter Duncan.

In the 1983 season, the Generals, under head coach Chuck Fairbanks and with Heisman Trophy-winning running back Herschel Walker on the team, performed poorly, ending the season with a 6–12 record. Additionally, Duncan was unhappy with the constant travel between Oklahoma and New York City, and so, following their inaugural season, he put the team up for sale. In 1983, Trump bought the team from Duncan for between $5 million and $10 million, (Note: Sources vary on how much Trump paid for the team. Trump stated that he paid $5 million for the team, and a 2016 article in the New York Daily News states that he paid between $5 million and $6 million for the team. However, in 2018, articles in both Business Insider and Paste stated that Trump had paid between $8 million and $9 million for the team. A 1984 article in The New York Times gives an estimate of approximately $9 million, a number also used in a 2020 article in The Daily Pennsylvanian. In 2018, an article on CNBC's website stated that he had "spent less than $10 million" for the team. That same year, an article on CBSSports.com gave the cost as $10 million. A 2018 article in The New York Times by sportswriter Jeff Pearlman states that Trump paid $10 million for the team. A former executive for the USFL has stated that the price for a new team was typically between $6 million and $9 million.) with Pearlman saying that the team at the time was valued at $8.5 million. According to Pearlman, Trump stated that there had been a bidding war for the team, which Pearlman says did not happen.

==== Generals under Trump ====
Prior to the 1984 season, Trump acquired a new head coach and new players for the Generals. On the field, he added three-time Pro Bowler Gary Barbaro and former NFL MVP Brian Sipe. At coaching, Trump attempted to lure Miami Dolphins head coach Don Shula with a salary of $1 million per year. Shula declined, with Trump stating that he had requested an apartment in Trump Tower as part of his contract, which Trump refused. Shula countered that he had lost interest after Trump had talked about the negotiations in a television interview that aired during a Dolphins game, and he didn't want the discussions to interfere with the team's season. Instead, Trump signed former New York Jets head coach Walt Michaels. In their first season under Trump's ownership, the Generals went 14–4 in the regular season and defeated eventual champions Philadelphia Stars twice, only to lose to them in the first round of the playoffs.

Following his purchase of the team, multiple individuals associated with the USFL expressed optimism that Trump would bring the league more attention and increase its value. Michael Tollin, who ran the USFL's highlight show, said, "As a new league we were just starving for attention, and he got us attention. I was as guilty as anyone. I featured him more prominently than any other owner. He was the equivalent of good copy — he was dazzling". A similar sentiment was expressed by Steve Ehrhart, an executive director for the league, who said, "He was able to generate so much publicity and respect for the league. I was very appreciative to that approach".

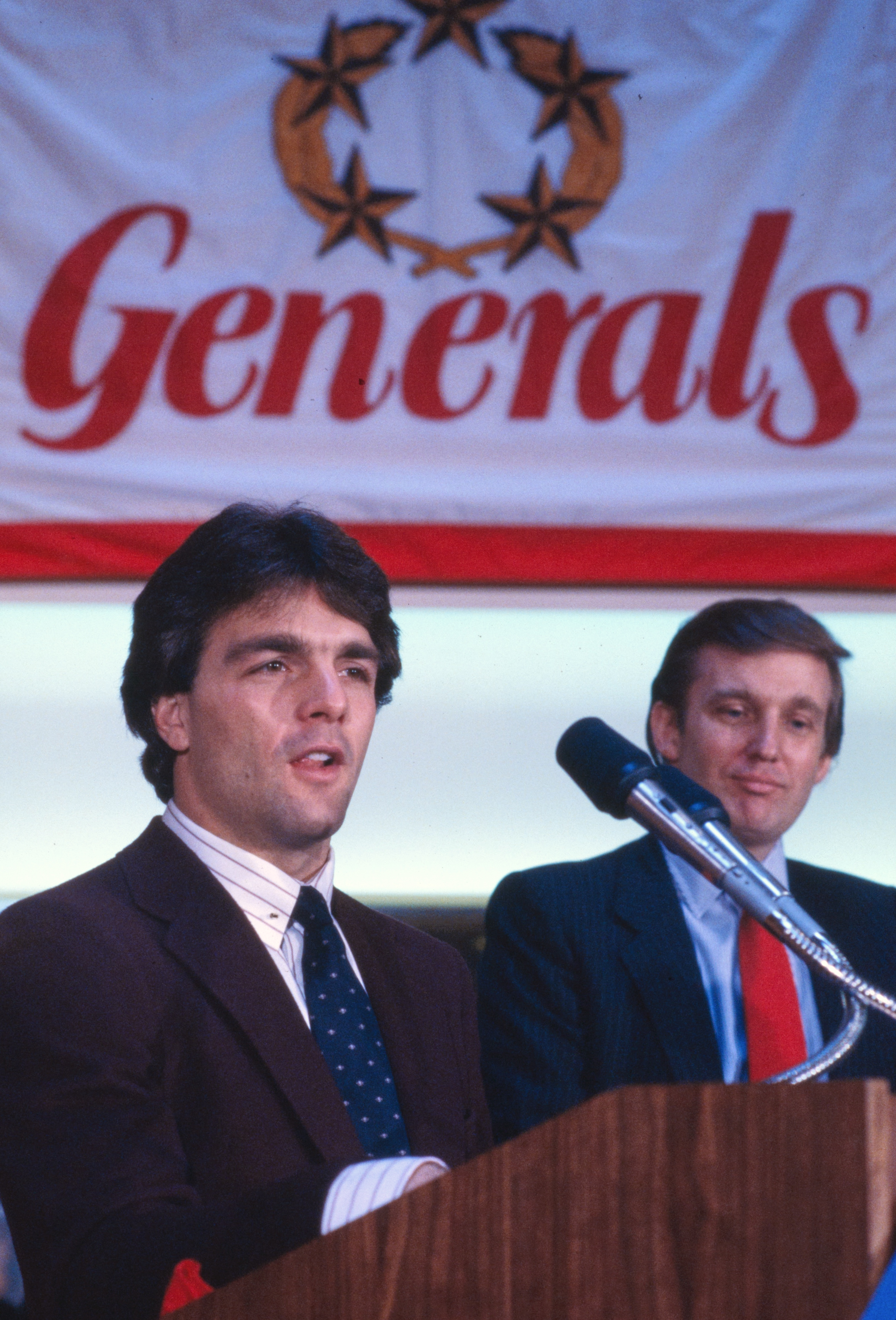
Doug Flutie (left) and Trump at a press conference in Trump Tower, 1985

Prior to the 1985 season, the Generals acquired Heisman Trophy-winning quarterback Doug Flutie, signing him to a multi-million-dollar multi-year contract. (Note: Sources vary on the details of the contract. In January 1985, the Associated Press stated that the contract was for $7 million over five years, while in April 1985, the United Press International stated that the contract was for $8.25 million over six years.) In April 1985, Trump, under his pseudonym of John Barron, told the United Press International that Flutie had been signed following a verbal agreement between Trump and the other team owners that he would be partially reimbursed for Flutie's contract. Trump stated, "People wanted me to get him for the good of the league. I told them I would sign him, but at some point I wanted partial reimbursement for the cost. From the standpoint of one team, it didn't make any economic sense to sign him. So I told them at some point I would ask for reimbursement". Additionally, Trump stated that he had written a letter to USFL commissioner Harry Usher requesting that the topic be addressed at a future meeting of the owners. Despite signing Flutie, the Generals posted a worse record than in the previous season, going 11–7 in the regular season and again losing in the first round of the playoffs to the Stars (who were now based out of Baltimore). Following the season, the New Jersey Generals merged with the Houston Gamblers, which added players Jim Kelly and Ricky Sanders onto the Generals' roster.

==== Decision to move to the fall ====
Shortly after becoming a team owner, Trump became opposed to the league's strategy of playing in the spring and pushed to move the league to the fall, where it would directly compete with the NFL. In a July 1984 interview with ABC News, he said, "If God wanted football in the spring, he wouldn't have created baseball". Trump believed that the move to the fall would lead to the league becoming as valuable as the NFL or would result in a merger between the NFL and USFL. Several executives in the USFL, including Tampa Bay Bandits' owner John F. Bassett, rejected Trump's proposal, believing that directly competing with the NFL would hurt the league. However, in mid-1986, the team owners voted 12–2 to move to the fall.

==== Lawsuit against the NFL ====
"His entire goal was to get him an NFL team. He didn't care how he got it. ... His goal was to get in the NFL. If it took a merger, so be it. If it took the entire USFL collapsing and he gets an [NFL] team, that's fine too"

— Jeff Pearlman, speaking to Newsweek in 2017 about Trump's goal as a USFL team owner

In addition to moving to the fall, the league decided to initiate a $1.7 billion antitrust lawsuit against the NFL. According to the USFL, the NFL had acted monopolistically in convincing the three major American television channels to not broadcast USFL games. The executives hoped that the lawsuit would result in either a forced merger, a large payout, or the voiding of the NFL's television contracts. Multiple sources state that Trump's intent with the lawsuit was to force a merger that would have resulted in him owning an NFL franchise. The trial took place in the United States District Court for the Southern District of New York, with Trump bringing in Harvey Myerson as the lead lawyer for the USFL and Roy Cohn as a consultant. In interviews with reporters, Trump stated that if the USFL did not win the case, the Generals would not play in the upcoming season. The trial received national attention, and Trump testified on June 23. At one point during his testimony, the legal team for the NFL stated that Trump had paid bussers and waiters to spy on NFL owners while they were staying at his hotels, which he denied.

During the trial, Trump stated that in March 1984, he had met with Rozelle at The Pierre hotel and, during the meeting, Rozelle tried to talk Trump out of moving the USFL to the fall, offering him an NFL franchise if he cooperated. However, Rozelle denied making this offer. Rozelle stated that Trump had been the one who set up the meeting and rented the space at The Pierre and from meeting notes showed that Trump had requested an NFL expansion team in New York City, with plans to sell off the Generals. Leslie Schupak, a person who was present at the meeting, later told Pearlman that Rozelle had told Trump, "As long as I or my heirs are involved in the NFL, you will never be a franchise owner in the league".

==== Aftermath ====
The trial lasted for 42 days, with the jury returning a verdict on July 29. The jury ruled against the NFL, although they also stated that the USFL's financial difficulties had not been caused by the NFL and awarded the USFL damages of only $1, which was tripled to $3 because it was from an antitrust case. At Myerson's advice, the league decided not to host a 1986 season as they appealed the case. However, just six days after the trial concluded, the USFL folded. Four years later, the Supreme Court of the United States allowed the ruling to stand and, with including interest, the NFL paid the USFL $3.76 in damages. A 2014 article in The Washington Post stated that, following the lawsuit, "Trump was effectively blackballed" from NFL team ownership.

In 2009, Tollin produced a documentary film for ESPN's 30 for 30 series called Small Potatoes: Who Killed the USFL?, which recounted the history of the USFL and included interviews from numerous individuals who had been involved in the league, including Trump. As part of the documentary, Tollin tried to answer the question of why the USFL failed and concludes that Trump's actions had a negative effect that led to the league shutting down. Trump was highly critical of the documentary, calling it "third rate" and calling Tollin "a loser" and "a sad guy". Pearlman was similarly critical of Trump's actions as an owner in the USFL in his 2018 book Football for a Buck: The Crazy Rise and Crazier Demise of the USFL, citing his involvement as ultimately detrimental to the survival of the league. Trump, on the other hand, says that his involvement in the league helped to keep it in existence for longer than it would have been otherwise and that it additionally boosted his own image. Concerning his social status before the USFL and the impact it had, Trump said, "I was well known, but not really well known. After taxes, I would say I lost $3 million. And I got a billion dollars of free publicity".

=== Attempted purchase of the New England Patriots ===
On February 16, 1988, Billy Sullivan, owner of the New England Patriots, announced that Trump was in discussions to purchase the team from him. Sullivan had been experiencing financial difficulties through the 1980s and Trump was one of several high-profile individuals who were in talks to purchase the team from him, which also included businessmen Jeffrey Chodorow, Robert Kraft, and St. Louis Mayor Vincent C. Schoemehl, among others. Trump had been given first chance to bid on the team. However, thirteen days after the announcement was made, Trump pulled out of the discussions, stating that the deal would have resulted in him also acquiring $104 million in debt from the team and the stadium. According to Sports Illustrated, Rozelle was also against Trump buying the team due to Trump's involvement in the USFL lawsuit several years before and his ownership of casinos in Atlantic City, New Jersey. According to The Boston Globe, acquiring the team would have cost Trump approximately $80 million. The same day that Trump pulled out, former United States Postmaster General Preston Robert Tisch began to negotiate with Sullivan about purchasing the team. Ultimately, Sullivan sold the team to businessman Victor Kiam.

=== Attempted purchase of the Buffalo Bills ===
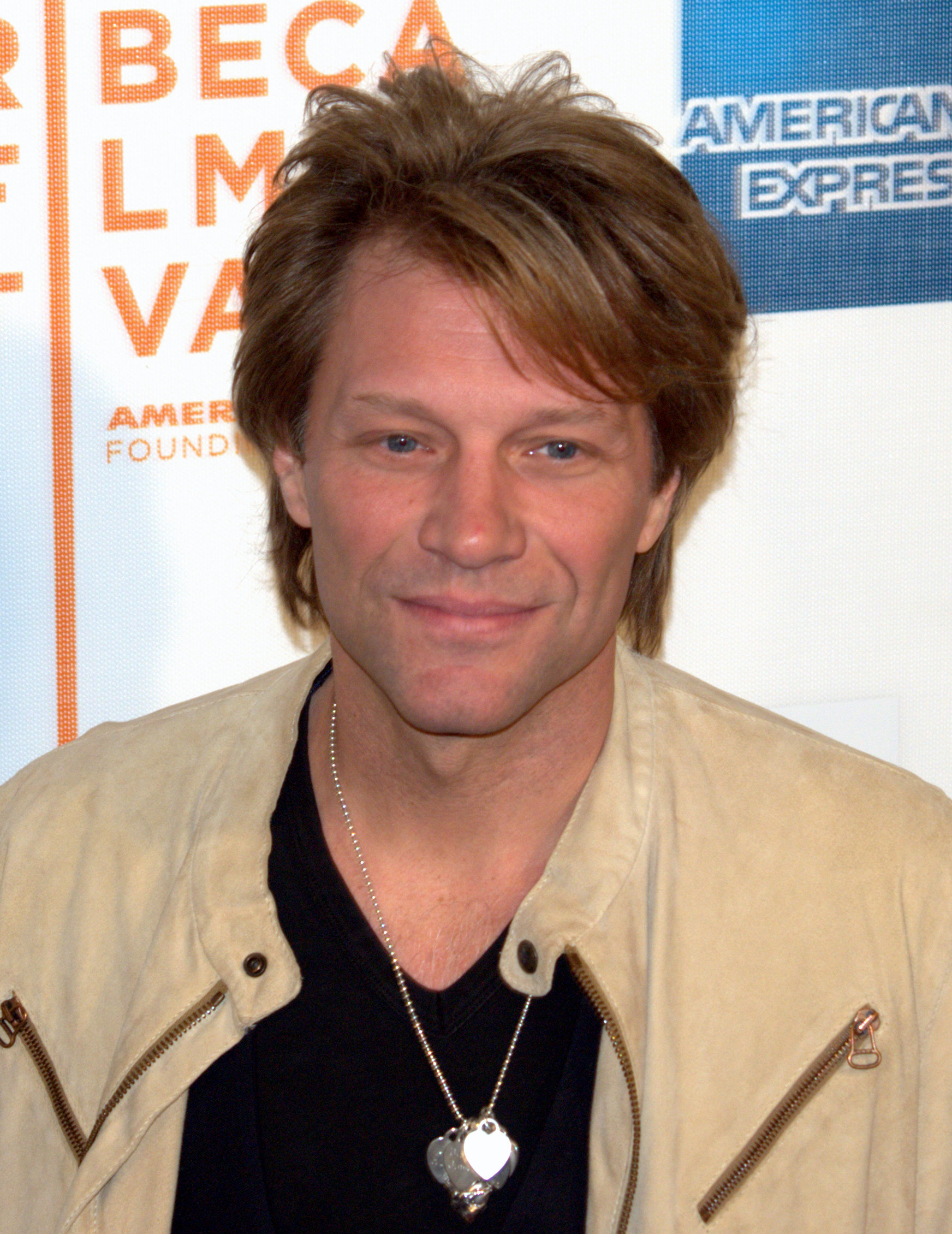
Trump employed a public opinion campaign against Jon Bon Jovi during his attempted purchase of the Buffalo Bills in 2014.

In March 2014, Ralph Wilson, the owner of the Buffalo Bills football team, died. Following this, the team was put up for sale and Trump made an effort to purchase them. Speaking to The Buffalo News in April, he said, "I'm going to give [buying the Bills] a heavy shot. I would love to do it, and if I can do it I'm keeping it in Buffalo". However, musician Jon Bon Jovi, who had formerly been a part owner of the Arena Football League's Philadelphia Soul, was considered the frontrunner to purchase the team, alongside a group of investors from Toronto. To help his chances of purchasing the team, Trump employed Michael Caputo, a political operative for the Republican Party, to organize a fan group called the "12th Man Thunder". The group spread rumors that Bon Jovi was planning to relocate the team to Canada and circulated a petition calling for any future owner to agree to keep the team in Buffalo. The group additionally set up "Bon Jovi Free Zones" in local restaurants and bars where music from Bon Jovi was not allowed. Caputo later stated, "We could be as insulting as we wanted to be", while Bon Jovi later told radio host Howard Stern that the move showed Trump to be an "evil genius". The group received widespread media attention, including an article in the magazine New York titled, "Jon Bon Jovi is the Most Hated Man in Buffalo". However, according to a 2018 article in Business Insider, the value that this campaign brought to Trump's attempted purchase is unclear, as Wilson's trust was expected to accept the highest bid regardless of the intent of the individual making the bid.

At the time, the Bills were valued at about $870 million and Trump's bid was for around $1 billion. (Note: Sources differ on the amount bid by Trump. In 2017, sportswriter Jeff Pearlman stated that Trump's bid had been for less than $1 billion, and in an interview with Newsweek that same year, he stated that the amount was for $900 million. However, a 2018 article in Business Insider stated that his bid had been estimated between $1.0 billion and $1.1 billion. A 2018 article in The Washington Post stated that Trump had attempted to bypass the NFL bidding process by offering $1 billion in cash. Trump made a similar statement in a 2015 interview with Sports Illustrated, where he said, "I bid a billion dollars, all cash on the table".) Meanwhile, Terry Pegula, a businessman in the natural gas industry and owner of the National Hockey League's Buffalo Sabres, placed a bid of $1.4 billion, acquiring the team. In a September 2015 interview with Sports Illustrated, Trump stated, "He [owner Terry Pegula] bought it for a billion-two, I believe, although they say it was a billion-four. I think he got it for a billion‑two". According to sportswriter Mike Freeman, a source from the NFL stated that other team owners were skeptical that Trump had the money needed to purchase the team, and a 2019 article in the Toronto Sun reported that, while Trump had made a nonbinding offer for the team in June 2014, he had not placed a final binding offer by the September 2014 deadline set by the existing owners, despite telling the press at the time that he had. On October 10, 2014, the Bills held a press conference to announce Pegula as the new owner.

During the announcement of Pegula as the new owner, Trump, then in Manhattan, tweeted, "The only reason I bid on @buffalobills was to make sure they stayed in Buffalo, where they belong. Mission accomplished." and "Wow. @nfl ratings are down big league. Glad I didn't get the Bills. Rather be lucky than good." In a 2015 interview with Sports Illustrated, which took place during his presidential campaign, Trump said, "I'm glad [I didn't get the team], because if I bought the Buffalo Bills, I probably would not be [running for president], which is much more important". Speaking to The Buffalo News shortly before the New York Republican presidential primary in April 2016, Trump expressed a similar attitude, saying, "I bid on that team half-heartedly because I really wanted to do this (run for president). I could not have done that (own the team) and this, because it would have been too much".

==== Claim that Trump inflated his net worth ====
In February 2019, Michael Cohen, who had served as an attorney for Trump, testified before the United States Congress that in 2014, Trump had inflated his net worth in order to help secure a loan from Deutsche Bank that would have helped in his efforts to buy the Bills. Cohen alleged that Trump had engaged in creative accounting, saying, "It was my experience that Mr. Trump inflated his total assets when it served his purposes, such as trying to be listed among the wealthiest people in Forbes. And he deflated his assets to reduce his real estate taxes". As part of his testimony, Cohen submitted three years of Trump's financial information, from 2011 to 2013, that was presented to Deutsche Bank, which showed Trump's net worth nearly double to $8.6 billion in the third year, with $4 billion in added assets being labeled "brand value". This "brand value", which was not defined in the documents, only appears in the third year.

=== Player protests ===
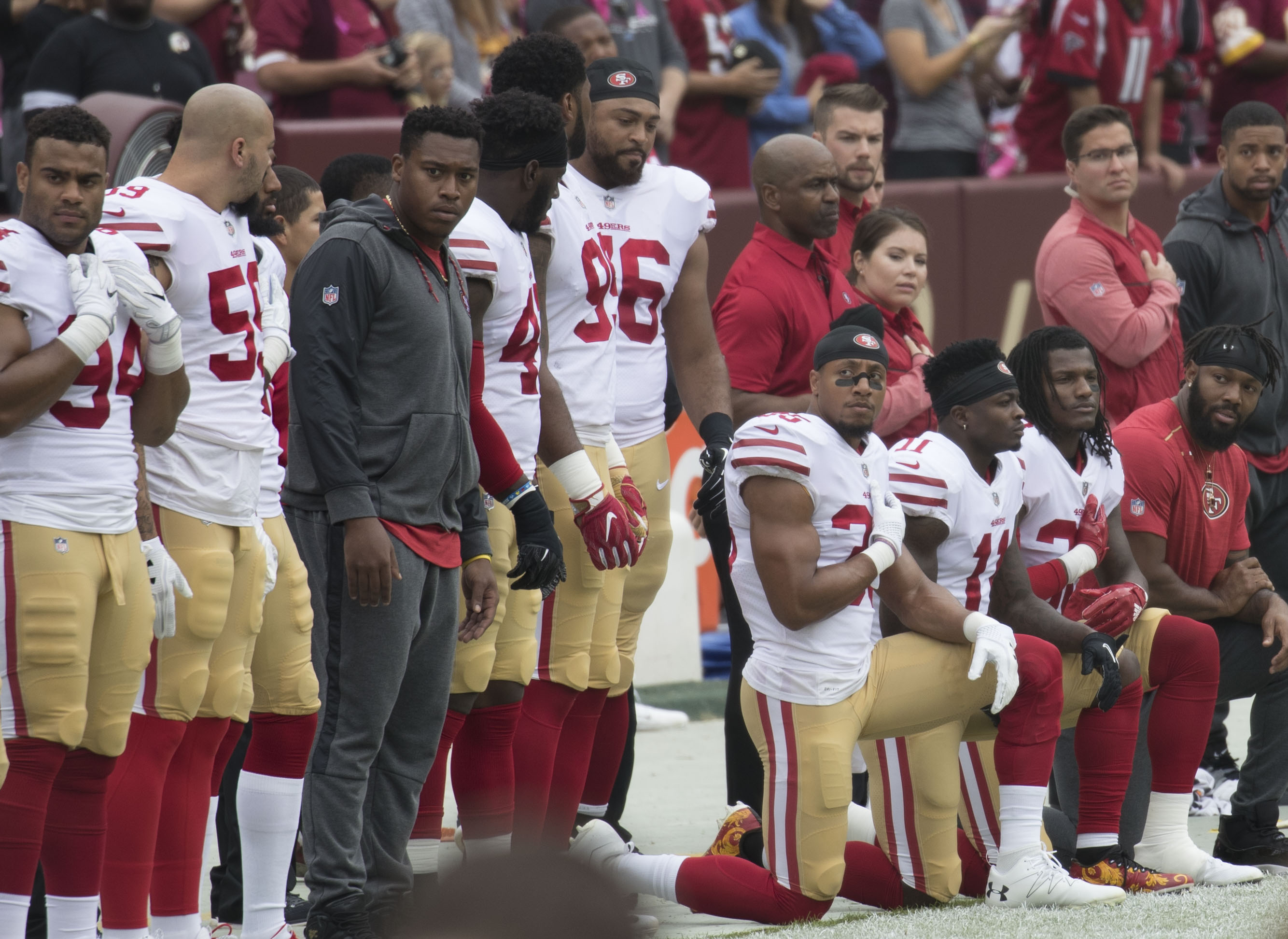
NFL players taking the knee prior to a game in October 2017

In August 2016, Colin Kaepernick, the quarterback for the San Francisco 49ers, refused to stand during the playing of the national anthem, which traditionally occurs before the beginning of NFL games, as a form of protest against racial inequality and police violence in the United States. Following this, other NFL players began to follow suit and either sat or knelt during the national anthem. On September 22, 2017, during a campaign rally for United States Senate candidate Luther Strange in Huntsville, Alabama, Trump criticized the protests and said that team owners should fire players who do not stand during the national anthem, saying, "Wouldn't you love to see one of these NFL owners, when somebody disrespects our flag, you'd say, 'Get that son of a bitch off the field right now. Out! He's fired' ". He also called for fans to boycott the NFL until the league addressed the protests.

The following day, NFL Commissioner Roger Goodell issued a statement in response that was critical of what Trump had said. Following his statements, the number of athletes who protested during national anthems increased substantially and included athletes outside of the NFL, including players from Major League Baseball and the National Basketball Association. Several news sources considered Trump's comments to be racially charged against the primarily African American athletes who were protesting. The comments were seen as elevating the protests from a small issue within the NFL to a part of the larger culture war between liberals and conservatives in the United States. Additionally, multiple commentators saw the attacks by Trump as a sort of retribution against the NFL as part of Trump's feud with the league, stemming in part from his inability to become a team owner. In a 2018 article for Business Insider, Schefter stated that some team owners believed Trump's targeting of the NFL was due to his belief that Goodell had played a role in his failed bid to purchase the Bills in 2014. Through late 2017, Trump continued to criticize the NFL, with Business Insider reporting that Trump tweeted about the NFL 37 times in one month, equating to about 12 percent of all of his tweets during that time. Broadcast journalist Shepard Smith of Fox News called the issue "the red meat of all red meat" for Trump's voter base and stated that Trump had reframed the protests away from the intent of the protestors.

In October 2017, team owners held a meeting wherein they discussed Trump's comments, with several owners, such as Robert Kraft (New England Patriots) and Jeffrey Lurie (Philadelphia Eagles), making statements that were critical of the president, with Kraft stating, "we have a president who will use that as fodder to do his mission that I don't feel is in the best interests of America. It's divisive and it's horrible". That same month, in what several commentators called a political stunt, Trump's vice president, Mike Pence, attended an NFL game and left shortly after several players protested. In June 2018, Trump disinvited the Philadelphia Eagles, who had won Super Bowl LII earlier that year, from visiting the White House, which was a traditional honor for championship collegiate and professional sports teams in the United States. The disinvitation came after many of the Eagles players stated their intention not to show up, with Trump stating that "only a small number of players" were expected to attend.

== College football ==
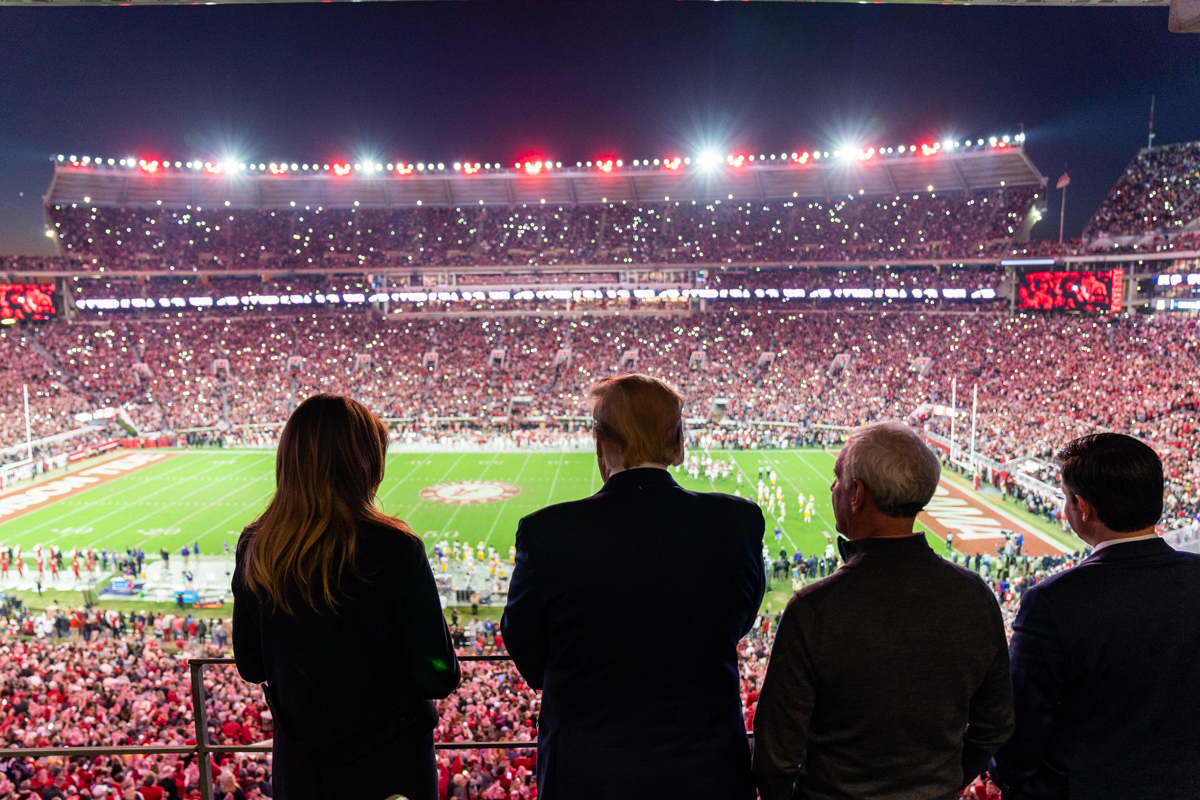
Trump (second from left) attending the 2019 LSU vs. Alabama Game of the Century

Trump is a noted fan of college football, with historian and professor Nicholas Sarantakes of the Naval War College comparing Trump's fandom and attendance of games as a form of political theatre to that of former president Richard Nixon's. Similar to Nixon, Sarantakes says, President Trump regularly attended games that included two teams from the Southern United States, an area that includes a large number of Trump's supporters. For instance, during one game that pitted teams from the southern states of Alabama and Georgia, White House Press Secretary Sarah Huckabee Sanders said both teams were "from two great states, both in the heart of Trump country". Some of the games he attended as president included the 2018 College Football Playoff National Championship in Atlanta, the 2019 LSU vs. Alabama Game of the Century in Tuscaloosa, Alabama, the 2019 and 2025 Army–Navy Games in Philadelphia and Baltimore, and the 2020 College Football Playoff National Championship in New Orleans. In the runup to the 2024 Republican Party presidential primaries, Trump attended several major rivalry games in the early primary states of Iowa (Iowa–Iowa State football rivalry) and South Carolina (the Palmetto Bowl).

Unlike with professional sports, Trump's relationship with college football during his presidency was relatively free from major controversy, with journalist Kevin Freking of the Associated Press saying, "college football has managed to avoid similar political controversies" in other sports. Prior to his attendance of the 2018 championship game, an article in The Hill said, "Trump and members of his administration have favored college-level athletics amid Trump's feuds with top athletes in both the NFL and the NBA". In most of the games he attended, he was well received by the attendees and often cheered and given loud chants of approval, though protests against Trump occurred at several of the games, such as the 2018 championship game.

== See also ==
- Sportswashing

== Video ==
- Small Potatoes: Who Killed the USFL? Michael Tollin, producer. ESPN 30-for-30 documentary, 2008.
