= -washing =

Suffix in the English language

The -washing suffix is used in various fields to discuss an individual's or organization's claimed promotion of pro-social values without putting those values into practice, or to distract from other harmful practices. It originates from the concept of whitewash paint; by the 17th century "whitewashing" had become a term suggesting an effort to give a particular appearance and to conceal negative aspects. The origin of "washing" as a suffix gained popularity in 1986 when Jay Westerveld coined the term "greenwashing" to criticize false corporate promotion of an eco-friendly image. The suffix was subsequently expanded to discuss a broader range of deceptive practices by corporations and other institutions.

== List ==
- AI washing – Marketing tactic
- Artwashing – Use of art in gentrification
- Bluewashing – Deceptive marketing over social practices
- Farmwashing – Deceptive farm-related marketing practices
- Greenwashing – Misleading environmental marketing claims
- Humanewashing – Misleading animal welfare claims
- Openwashing – Term to describe presenting something as open
- Pinkwashing (breast cancer) – Form of cause marketing that uses a range of pink ribbon logos
- Pinkwashing (LGBTQ) – Promotional use of LGBTQ rights; also known as rainbow-washing
- Purplewashing – Use of feminist aesthetics to promote organisations
- Redwashing – Adopting inauthentic left-wing rhetoric for gain
- Sanewashing – Downplaying the radical aspects of a person or idea
- Sportswashing – Using sports to improve reputations
- Well-being washing – Public policy framework
- Whitewashing (communications) – Sanitizing and hiding of undesirable qualities
- Whitewashing in film – Controversial casting practice in the film industry
