= Reputation laundering =

Use of positive actions to conceal unethical behavior

Reputation laundering occurs when a person or an organization conceals unethical, corrupt, or criminal behavior or other forms of controversy by performing highly visible positive actions with the intent to improve their reputation and obscure their history.

Reputation laundering can include gestures such as donating to charities, sponsoring sports teams, or joining prominent associations.

== Origin of the term ==
One of the first uses of the phrase "reputation laundering" was in 1996, in the book The United Nations and Transnational Organized Crime, which defined it as "the process of acquiring respectability in a new environment".

An early use of the phrase in mass media was in 2010, in a Guardian article headlined "PR firms make London world capital of reputation laundering", a report which focused on the use of public relations (PR) firms by heads of state (including Saudi Arabia, Rwanda, Kazakhstan, and Sri Lanka) to obscure human rights abuses and corruption.

The phrase was in common use by 2016 when it was used by Transparency International in their report "Paradise Lost: Ending the UK's role as a safe haven for corrupt individuals, their allies and assets". In that report, they defined reputation laundering as "the process of concealing the corrupt actions, past or present, of an individual, government or corporate entity, and presenting their character and behaviour in a positive light."

The phrase "reputation laundering" is a play on the older phrase "money laundering".

== Activities associated with reputation laundering ==
Reputation laundering includes activities such as:

- Using public relations companies
- Developing political connections to influence governments
- Hiring law firms to combat allegations related to past unethical conduct
- Donating to cultural, charitable, and educational organizations
- Sending children to elite schools
- Investing in prestigious sports teams
- Sponsoring major sporting or entertainment events
- Buying highly visible luxury real estate
- Hiring consultants to enhance their image
- Establishing partnerships with museums or universities

== Public relations firms ==
Reputation laundering activities are sometimes delegated to professional public relations (PR) firms. Techniques employed by PR firms on behalf of the purportedly corrupt or criminal customers include fake social media accounts, blogs by fake personalities, or partisan op-eds.

Before it was forced to close, the British public relations firm Bell Pottinger was noted for using PR techniques for reputation laundering, supporting clients such as Alexander Lukashenko, Bahrain, and the Pinochet Foundation.

Public relations firms Havas, Publicis, and Qorvis were hired by Saudi Arabia to perform reputation laundering after 9/11 and the Assassination of Jamal Khashoggi.

== Notable examples ==
=== Sports ===
Involvement in professional sports, by sponsorship or ownership, is a prominent activity used for reputation laundering. Examples include the 2022 FIFA World Cup in Qatar, Formula 1 motor races in the Middle East, ownership of Chelsea F.C. by Roman Abramovich, and ownership of the Newcastle United football club by Saudi Arabian investors.

=== Charity ===
Reputation laundering often involves charitable donations from the persons attempting to improve their reputation. One study found that Russian oligarchs had donated between $372 million and $435 million to charitable institutions in the United States. Charities and non-profits that received funds, according to a database compiled by David Szakonyi and Casey Michel include MIT, Brandeis University, Mayo Clinic, John F. Kennedy Center for the Performing Arts, New York University, Brookings Institution, Harvard University, and the New York Museum of Modern Art.

The Sackler family is particularly notable for its charitable donations that aim to repair their reputation, which was heavily damaged by their role in the opioid crisis. Since 2009, the family has donated over £170m to art institutions in the United Kingdom. The family's philanthropy has been characterized as "reputation laundering" from profits acquired from the selling of opiates. The Sackler family name, as used in institutions which the family have donated to, saw increased scrutiny in the late 2010s over the family's association with OxyContin. David Crow, writing in the Financial Times, described the family name as "tainted" (cf. Tainted donors). In March 2019, the National Portrait Gallery and the Tate galleries announced that they would not accept further donations from the family. This came after the American photographer Nan Goldin threatened to withdraw a planned retrospective of her work in the National Portrait Gallery if the gallery accepted a £1 million donation from a Sackler fund. In June 2019, NYU Langone Medical Center announced they will no longer be accepting donations from the Sacklers, and have since changed the name of the Sackler Institute of Graduate Biomedical Sciences to the Vilcek Institute of Graduate Biomedical Sciences. Later in 2019, the American Museum of Natural History, and the Solomon R. Guggenheim Museum and Metropolitan Museum of Art in New York, each announced they will not accept future donations from any Sacklers that were involved in Purdue Pharma. In 2022, the British Museum announced that it would rename the Raymond and Beverly Sackler Rooms and the Raymond and Beverly Sackler Wing, as part of "development of the new masterplan", and that it "made this decision together through collaborative discussions" with the Sackler Foundation. Prior to the collapse of his cryptocurrency exchange, FTX, entrepreneur Sam Bankman-Fried is not known to have laundered, but is alleged to have used (among other means) "a value system of utilitarian idealism ... not orientated toward money"—for example promising to give away 99 percent of his fortune—which led to investors letting "down their due diligence guard."

=== Collaborating with media ===
Alex Shephard, writing in the New Republic, asserts that general Mark Milley—chairman of the Joint Chiefs of Staff—engaged in self-beneficial reputation laundering when he acted as a primary source for news media, providing media with inside accounts of events in the Trump White House. Milley's intention, according to some analysts, was to prompt major media outlets to rehabilitate his reputation (tainted by the association with the Trump administration) and in exchange, Milley provided insider information to the media.

Arwa Mahdawi, columnist for The Guardian, characterized Rudy Giuliani's appearance on The Masked Singer as reputation laundering.

=== Russian oligarchs ===
The United Kingdom government generated a report in 2020, analyzing the activities of Russian oligarchs in the United Kingdom. The report states that the oligarchs had been "extending patronage and building influence across a wide sphere of the British establishment" and had employed public relations firms that were "willing beneficiaries, contributing to a ‘reputation laundering' process".

A notable example of Russian oligarchs participating in reputation laundering is Viatcheslav Moshe Kantor, who donated £9 million to King Edward VII's Hospital, a facility used by the UK royal family and patronized by the queen. The donation came under scrutiny after Kantor was placed under sanctions during the 2022 invasion of Ukraine, and the hospital removed Kantor's name from a wing of the hospital.

=== Angolese kleptocrats ===
According to the National Endowment for Democracy, kleptocrats from former Portuguese colony Angola used Portugal as a base to engage in reputation laundering. In particular, Isabel dos Santos, the billionaire daughter of Angola’s president, was alleged to engage in reputation laundering. Examples of reputation laundering by Angolese aristocrats included participation in high-profile social events, and promoting philanthropic endeavors.

=== Louvre Abu Dhabi ===
According to the National Endowment for Democracy, aristocrats of United Arab Emirates engaged in reputation laundering when they established a partnership with France's Louvre museum, and created the Louvre Abu Dhabi.

=== Saudi Arabia ===
The public relations firm Qorvis was hired by Saudi Arabia to improve its image in the wake of the September 11 attacks, paying the company $14.7 million between March and September 2002. Qorvis engaged in a PR frenzy that publicized the "9/11 Commission finding that there was 'no evidence that the Saudi government as an institution or senior Saudi officials individually funded Al Qaeda, while omitting the report's conclusion that 'Saudi Arabia has been a problematic ally in combating Islamic extremism.'" Petruzzello told The Washington Post that the work was not about "lobbying" but "educating" the public and policy makers.

Qorvis also had lead role in shaping media coverage of the widely criticized Saudi-led attack on Yemen of 2015. This included the creation of the website operationrenewalofhope.com and helping Saudi officials gain access to US media. One example of the latter is a Newsweek article in which the Saudi foreign minister claims that, far from "supporting violent extremism", his country has actually shown "leadership in combating terrorism".

Qorvis has also been employed by Saudi Arabia to repair its image and reputation following the Kingdom's assassination of journalist Jamal Khashoggi, receiving $18.8 million from October 2018 through July 2019 and signing three additional contracts with the Kingdom in spring 2019.

== See also ==
- -washing
- Corporate sociopolitical activism
- Ethics of philanthropy#Tainted donors]
- Money laundering
- Reputation management
