= Greenhushing =

Under-reporting of corporate sustainability initiatives

Greenhushing (sometimes called brownwashing or greenblushing) is the deliberate practice of under-reporting or withholding communication about an organization's corporate sustainability or environmental initiatives. Unlike greenwashing, in which firms exaggerate or fabricate environmental claims, greenhushing occurs when organizations implement genuine sustainability measures but choose not to disclose them publicly.

Companies may engage in greenhushing to protect legitimacy, avoid accusations of greenwashing, manage political risks, or limit scrutiny of their operations.

== Definition ==
Scholars define greenhushing as a form of "communication decoupling" in which the alignment between sustainability actions and disclosure is broken. Whereas greenwashing involves making environmental claims not matched by practice, greenhushing involves genuine practices not matched by claims.

== Causes ==
Research identifies several drivers of greenhushing:

- Reputation management — avoiding accusations of hypocrisy or greenwashing by critics.
- Regulatory and political uncertainty — especially amid ESG backlash in the United States, where more than 40 anti-ESG laws have been enacted since 2021.
- Consumer skepticism — fear of the "green stigma," where eco-labeled products are seen as lower quality.
- Industry dynamics — reluctance to raise benchmarks for entire sectors by publicizing advanced practices.
- Altruistic or intrinsic motives — firms may act for social benefit without seeking recognition.

== Effects ==
Studies suggest that greenhushing can have negative consequences:

- Loss of competitive advantages such as product differentiation or regulatory goodwill.
- Reduced transparency and information asymmetry for investors and consumers.

A study from the Journal of Advertising Research found that lower sustainability levels are less transparent, thus providing hardly any signals to stakeholders.

- Slowed industry-wide sustainability progress due to lack of shared best practices.

== Examples ==
Documented cases include:

- Tourism (UK) — rural businesses in the Peak District reported only 30% of their sustainability actions online, rarely mentioning climate change.
- Hospitality (Europe) — hotels in Germany, Austria, and Switzerland that greenhushed were perceived less favorably by guests than those communicating openly.
- Volunteer tourism (Indonesia) — operators in Yogyakarta found greenhushing more trustworthy among tourists compared to greenwashing.
- Meat industry (Italy) — small and medium-sized enterprises engaged in sustainability practices but avoided formal reporting to reduce scrutiny.
- Financial stability (China) — heavily polluting A-share listed companies implemented emission reduction strategies but deliberately avoided publicizing their environmental efforts because silence helped prevent their stock prices from crashing.

== Academic perspectives ==
Academics view greenhushing as a strategic response to institutional complexity. It has been described as:

- A form of institutional maintenance work, preserving legitimacy by limiting exposure.
- Institutional repair work, where firms reduce transparency to protect sustainability practices amid ESG backlash.

== Social Media and Greenhushing ==
Social media plays a role in how industries engage in greenhushing. A 2025 study analyzed the social media activity of UK hotels to uncover subtle greenhushing tactics. They discovered that “only 1.5% of Facebook posts and 1.8% of Instagram posts” addressed sustainability. They also reported lower engagement with sustainability posts compared to non-sustainability posts, suggesting that engagement level reflects user feedback on sustainability initiatives by these hotels.

Another study utilizing large-scale observational data from X showed a similar result. It was found that corporate sustainability communications on social media are associated with an 29.11% decrease in engagement volume across companies’ regular communications.

== See also ==
- Corporate social responsibility
- Environmental, social, and governance
- Green marketing
- Greenwashing
