= Greenlash =

Backlash against green politics

Greenlash (a portmanteau of "green" and "backlash") is a political term used to describe a backlash against the environmental movement and green politics. Although the term may be framed as a broad opposition against green policies in general, it often refers specifically to policies with perceived individual economic consequences.

== History ==
The term was popularised by Nathalie Tocci.

In March 2023, the Farmer–Citizen Movement finished as the largest party in the 2023 Dutch provincial elections campaigning against new limits on nitrogen emissions. In May 2023, governor of Florida Ron DeSantis banned government officials from promoting environmental, social, and governance goals. That month, French president Emmanuel Macron and Belgian prime minister Alexander De Croo called for a temporary pause in new green initiatives at the European level. Expansion of the London Ultra Low Emission Zone in August 2023, provoked a campaign of vandalism.

In February 2024, president of the European Commission Ursula von der Leyen announced that the commission would shelve a proposed policy to reduce pesticide use in half by 2030. In April 2024, Maroš Šefčovič, Executive Vice-president of the European Commission for the European Green Deal, said that "from the recent farmer protests to the rise in support for populism cultivating a resistance to climate policies, we can see signs of wariness among our citizens."

The Financial Times labelled greenlash as one of its "Year in a Word" articles in 2024.

== Analysis ==
Elisabetta Cornago of the Centre for European Reform has stated that there are four broad types of policies that can trigger greenlash: policies that affect cost of living, policies banning carbon-intensive technologies that limit consumer choice, policies forcing "greening of existing assets," and policies that directly affect special interest groups like farmers. Greenlash may be driven by conspiracy theories and distrust.

Guillaume Chapron of the Swedish University of Agricultural Sciences has stated that "the speed at which EU and national politicians abandoned green policies reflects the strong penetration of industrial agriculture into decision spheres." Nathalie Tocci has suggested that far-right political parties in Europe have changed their rhetoric surrounding the climate crisis as part of the greenlash, saying that they are "no longer openly climate crisis deniers," but instead "denounce the inequalities and the harm caused to industry they say are exacerbated by climate policies."

== Responses ==
Mikael Leyi, secretary general of Solidar, has stated that "rather than focusing solely on abstract emissions targets, we should underscore the local, immediate and long-term benefits of sustainable policies" to counter greenlash.

== See also ==
- Greenwashing
- Backlash (sociology)
