= John G. Matsusaka =

Economist, political scientist, author

- Occupations: Economist and political scientist, academic, author

Academic background
- Education: B.A., Economics; M.A., Economics; Ph.D., Economics
- Alma mater: University of Washington; University of Chicago
- Website: https://www.johnmatsusaka.com/

John G. Matsusaka is an economist, political scientist, author, and academic. He is the Charles F. Sexton Chair in American Enterprise, Professor of Finance and Business Economics, Business and Law, and Political Science, at the University of Southern California, and the Executive Director at the Initiative and Referendum Institute at the University of Southern California.

Matsusaka has contributed to the fields of direct democracy, political economy, government finance, corporate finance, and corporate governance, with publications spanning economics, finance, law, and political science. He is the author of two books, For the Many or the Few: The Initiative, Public Policy, and American Democracy and Let the People Rule: How Direct Democracy Can Meet the Populist Challenge, and provides commentary for print media including New York Times, Wall Street Journal, Washington Post, Los Angeles Times, Sacramento Bee, Bloomberg News, Financial Times, USA Today, The Huffington Post, Politico, and The Hill, and for television and radio media, including NPR, CBS, CNN, CNBC, BBC, and CTV (Canada). He has also consulted for the White House Council of Economic Advisors and is the recipient of Merton Miller Prize for the most significant article by the Journal of Business, the Duncan Black Prize for best article in Public Choice.

Matsusaka serves as an associate editor for the Journal of Political Institutions and Political Economy and is a member of the editorial boards of Public Choice and ProMarket Blog.

== Education ==
Matsusaka received his bachelor's degree in economics from the University of Washington. He received his master's degree and Ph.D. in economics from the University of Chicago.

== Career ==
For most of his career, Matsusaka has been a professor at the University of Southern California (USC), where he is Professor of Finance and Business Economics in the Marshall School of Business, Professor of Business and Law in the Gould School of Law, and Professor of Political Science in the Department of Political Science and International Relations. Since 2009 he has held the Charles F. Sexton Chair in American Enterprise at USC.

Matsusaka also serves as executive director of the Initiative and Referendum Institute at USC, which he has led since 2004. Prior to that, he was a director of IRI starting in 1998.

Matsusaka served as vice dean for faculty and academic affairs in the USC Marshall School of Business from 2007 to 2013. He served as interim vice provost for faculty at USC from 2019 to 2020. He was elected to the executive board of the Academic Senate in 2022.

== Media ==
Matsusaka has appeared in podcasts, written opinion pieces, and offered commentary for various media outlets, including the New York Times, The Wall Street Journal, The Washington Post, Los Angeles Times, Sacramento Bee, USA Today, Bloomberg News, The Financial Times, CNN, and NPR. His book, Let the People Rule: How Direct Democracy Can Meet the Populist Challenge, was referenced in a 2020 Tribune India piece that discussed the flaws and challenges within the United States' democracy.

=== Works ===
Matsusaka's first book, For the Many or the Few: The Initiative, Public Policy, and American Democracy, published by the University of Chicago Press in 2004, shows empirically that voter initiatives lead to majority rule and do not empower narrow special interests. In her review for The Journal of Politics, Caroline Tolbert noted that the book offers valuable insights into American democratic institutions by examining ballot initiatives on public policy. His second book, Let the People Rule: How Direct Democracy Can Meet the Populist Challenge, published by Princeton University Press in 2022, explores the populist pressures that are challenging democracies across the world, and proposes solutions based on greater use of direct democracy.

== Research ==
Matsusaka has authored scholarly articles and books focusing on direct democracy, political economy, corporate governance, and corporate finance. His political economy research encompasses topics such as tax policy, voter turnout, and representation as well as the role of initiatives and referendums in American politics. His corporate finance and corporate governance research encompasses mergers and acquisitions, divestitures, capital budgeting, shareholder proposals, and shareholder democracy.

=== Direct democracy ===
Much of Matsusaka's research focuses on the political phenomenon of direct democracy, evaluating both its promises and potential pitfalls. His most cited findings are that initiatives resulted in state taxes and spending, and that initiatives tend to align policies with the preferences of the majority, rather than empower narrow special interests. He has produced a series of papers showing how direct democracy affects the tax and spending policies, social policies, the executive branch, election laws, union wages, and corporations. His article in the Journal of Political Economy (1995) showed for the first time that states with initiatives adopt different fiscal policies, specifically lower taxes and spending and less redistribution, in the postwar period. A follow up paper in The Journal of Law and Economics (2000) found that initiative states actually spent more than noninitiative states in the early 20th century, showing that initiative effects vary over time. His Journal of Public Economics article (2002) with Lars Feld, studied Swiss cantons, and found that requiring voter approval for new spending programs (mandatory referendums) resulted in significantly less government spending. His article in Public Choice (2018) tested for the importance of the order propositions are listed on the ballot, and using data from California 1958–2014 and Texas 1986 showed that propositions listed at the top of the ballot do not enjoy a significant advantage over those at the bottom. His most recent article in The Journal of Law and Economics (2023) shows that businesses and unions have usually been harmed rather that hurt by democracy.

=== Finance and corporate governance ===
Matsusaka's work in finance and corporate governance has focused on mergers and acquisitions, corporate diversification, and corporate governance. His study in The Rand Journal of Economics (1993) analyzed the stock market's response to acquisition announcements during the conglomerate merger wave of the late 1960s, finding that investors valued the creation of conglomerate corporations, contrary to the then-prevailing wisdom that conglomerates were inefficient. His Journal of Business article (2001) developed a dynamic theory of corporate diversification as a search process for new opportunities, which explained why diversified firms might trade at discounts compared to single-segment firms even though their strategies are efficient. The article received the Merton Miller Prize for best paper in the journal. His 2002 study in the Journal of Financial Intermediation with Vikram Nanda presented a theory of organization based on the benefits and costs associated with internal capital markets. His article in Journal of Financial Economics (2010) with Ran Duchin and Oguzhan Ozbas estimates the effect of independent boards of directors on a firm's performance, finding that independent directors improve performance as long as information costs are not too high. The paper introduced the idea of using changes imposed by the Sarbanes-Oxley Act to identify the effects of governance on performance. His article in the Review of Financial Studies (2019), with Oguzhan Ozbas and Irene Yi, shows that union shareholders use shareholder proposals opportunistically to influence collective bargaining outcomes. His most recent research focuses on shareholder democracy, seeking to understand when it can work and when it fails. Among the topics investigated are shareholder proposals, shareholder voting, and proxy advice.

=== Political economy, voter turnout, and representation ===
Matsusaka's research in political economy, other than that related to direct democracy, has covered voter turnout, tax and spending policy, representation, and government responsiveness. In two empirical studies with Thomas W. Gilligan, he provided some of the first evidence that larger legislatures tended to spend more due to a "fiscal commons" problem. In a series of articles on voter turnout published in Public Choice, some with Filip Palda, he examined the validity of the rational choice model, and has extended the model theoretically to incorporate limited information. His 2010 article in the Quarterly Journal of Political Science was one of the first to provide statistical evidence that state policies quite often do not reflect the preference of a majority of citizens. Most recently, his article in the Journal of Comparative Economics (2023) with Ekkehard Kohler and Yanhui Wu, reported the results of a field experiment gauging the responsiveness of low-level bureaucrats to citizen requests for information in China, Germany, and the United States.

== Awards and honors ==
- 2001 – Merton Miller Prize, Journal of Business
- 2016 – Duncan Black Prize, Public Choice

== Bibliography ==
=== Books ===
- For the Many or the Few: The Initiative, Public Policy, and American Democracy (2008) ISBN 978-0226510828
- Let the People Rule: How Direct Democracy Can Meet the Populist Challenge (2020) ISBN 978-0691199726

=== Selected articles ===
- Matsusaka, J. G. (1993). Takeover motives during the conglomerate merger wave. The RAND Journal of Economics, 357–379.
- Matsusaka, J. G. (1995). Fiscal effects of the voter initiative: Evidence from the last 30 years. Journal of political Economy, 103(3), 587–623.
- Matsusaka, J. G. (2001). Corporate diversification, value maximization, and organizational capabilities. The Journal of Business, 74(3), 409–431.
- Matsusaka, J. G. (2005). Direct democracy works. Journal of Economic perspectives, 19(2), 185–206.
- Duchin, R., Matsusaka, J. G., & Ozbas, O. (2010). When are outside directors effective?. Journal of financial economics, 96(2), 195–214.
