= Sin industry =

Legal commercial activities often considered to be immoral or unethical

Sin industries are commercial activities which, while legal, are often considered to be immoral, unethical or harmful. They include industries such as the alcohol, tobacco, weapons, gambling and sex industries. The term is used within the investment industry and stocks in such companies are known as sin stocks.

Investing in sin stocks can be viewed as the opposite strategy to investment based on environmental, social, and governance (ESG) principles. There is some evidence that sin stocks may outperform stocks in other types of companies; however, these results have been attributed to statistical biases, rather than any inherent advantage of 'sin'. Recent evidence also suggests that the magnitude of the sin-stock premium may vary across religious contexts, with stronger abnormal returns reported in countries where Abrahamic religious norms are more prevalent and weaker or negative effects in atheist and non-Abrahamic settings. Seemingly paradoxically, companies in 'sin' sectors may have higher ratings in the social aspects of ESG than other comparable companies.

== See also ==
- Contrarian investing
- Investment strategy
- Reputational damage
