= Jay Westerveld =

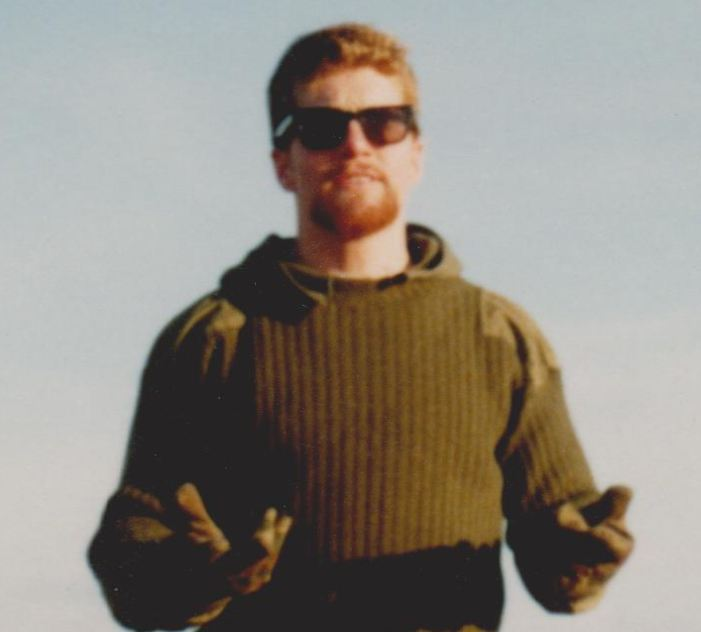
- Jay Westerveld

Jay Westerveld (frequently misspelled Westervelt and Westerveldt) is a field biologist and researcher of habitats associated with endangered species including the clam shrimp, bog turtle, Atlantic Coast leopard frog and the Eastern cricket frog. Westerveld coined the term "greenwashing".

== Career ==
In 1986, Westerveld coined the term "greenwash" in an essay examining practices of the hotel industry.

In 2009, Westerveld described a new population of rare clam shrimp, the fourth population recorded in New York state out of approximately a dozen worldwide. He was also responsible for locating the habitat of additional members of a recently discovered species of frog.

Between 2008 and 2010, Westerveld opposed construction on the Glenmere mansion restoration project. Westerveld writes that the Glenmere Lake hosts New York's largest population of the endangered Northern Cricket Frog. In 2010, the New York State Department of Environmental Conservation halted the construction when it became apparent that the developers were operating without the required environmental permits and paperwork. The mansion's developers were fined and cited by the New York Department of Environmental Conservation for violations of having proper paperwork in regard to the impact of construction on the endangered Northern Cricket Frog. Subsequent studies found no frog habitats on the property and the Mansion and grounds were restored.
