= Workiva =

American software company

Workiva Inc.
- Type: Public
- Traded as: NYSE: WK (Class A); Russell 2000 Component
- Industry: Cloud computing; Computer software; Enterprise software
- Founded: 2008
- Headquarters: Ames, Iowa, US
- Key people: Julie Iskow (President & CEO); Jill Klindt (CFO); Brandon Ziegler (Legal)
- Services: Cloud computing
- Revenue: ▲$739m (2024)
- Net income: ▲ -$55m (2024)
- Total assets: ▲$1.4b (2024)
- Total equity: ▲ -$41.7m (2024)
- Number of employees: ▲2,828 (2024)
- Website: www.workiva.com

Workiva, Inc. is a global software-as-a-service (SaaS) company. It provides a cloud-based connected and reporting compliance platform that enables the use of connected data and automation of reporting across finance, accounting, risk, and compliance.

== History ==
=== Early history ===
==== 2008 - 2014 ====
In August 2008, Workiva Inc. was formed as WebFilings LLC in California by Jerry Behar and a team of five other entrepreneurs.

Martin Vanderploeg was a co-founder of EAI and served as CTO and Executive Vice President until they were acquired in 2000 by UGS Corp, and is now a division of Siemens, the German technology multinational.

The Workiva Platform is a cloud-based enterprise software-as-a-service platform that enables companies to collect, manage, report and analyse critical business data in real time. Wdesk also allows companies to manage and file financial and compliance documents to regulatory agencies.

Workiva integrates information from disparate content formats, including spreadsheets, presentation documents, emails and other unstructured data, into a single cloud-based report.

In July 2014, the company changed its name to Workiva LLC.

=== Recent history ===
==== 2014 - 2019 ====
The company went public in December 2014 and with an IPO on the New York Stock Exchange (NYSE: WK).

Deloitte's 2015 Technology Fast 500 survey of fastest growing technology companies in America Workiva ranked fiftieth among all software companies. In the DevOps Excellence Awards 2019, Workiva won Best Software-Defined Product.

In May 2019, Workiva opened offices in Frankfurt, Germany, and Paris, France. The company also has offices in Amsterdam and London, 12 U.S. cities, and two Canadian cities.

Workiva’s product Wdata allows users to connect large datasets of information to the Workiva platform. It was designed to improve the usefulness of Wdesk. Wdata connects data from enterprise resource planning, governance risk and compliance platforms, and other third-party, on-premise systems and cloud applications.

In September, Workiva updated the Wdata platform to include automatic updates, approval workflows, finance and accounting connectors, risk and control integration, and improved controlled access tools. The company also integrated its platforms with BlackLine, a producer of financial close software. The integration allows accountants to connect and transfer data between the two companies. Later in September, Workiva established a partnership with FloQast, a financial close management software company. The two offer a reporting and compliance solution for private companies, as well as for companies to use before and after they issue an initial public offering of stock.

==== 2020 - 2025 ====
In April 2020, Workiva launched W for ESEF. It is a solution to help European companies comply with the European Securities and Markets Authority (ESMA) requirements for European Single Electronic Format (ESEF) reporting. W for ESEF was made available in 23 European languages. Companies can use the solution to build reports, tag data, and compile the final ESEF submission package.

In November 2020, Workiva appointed COO Julie Iskow to the board. She was named one of the 50 most powerful women in tech in 2019.

In May, the company updated its cloud platform to help companies with Environmental, Social and Corporate Governance (ESG) reporting.

In July 2021, the company became the first SaaS company to enter the United Nations’ Global Compact CFO Taskforce. A few months later, in August 2021, Workiva made its first acquisition when it acquired OneCloud, which provides integration platform as a service software.

In December 2021, Workiva acquired AuditNet, a global audit content and services provider.

In February 2023, Workiva announced that President and Chief Operating Officer Julie Iskow would succeed Marty Vanderploeg as CEO, starting April 1.

In June 2024, Workiva acquired Sustain.Life, a carbon accounting software startup, to enhance its sustainability reporting capabilities.

In September 2025, the company launched an agentic AI platform, Workiva AI.

== Applications ==
Workiva's first SaaS product was SEC reporting software designed to enable corporations to automate their SEC filings by using a proprietary system of document tags and linking. The platform also enabled companies to file electronically directly with the SEC, using the business mark-up language XBRL (Extensible Business Reporting Language), required by the SEC. A customer of Workiva's was the first company to file Inline XBRL with the SEC.

The company has since expanded to include other corporate financial and compliance reporting functions, including:

- Sarbanes–Oxley reporting and Recovery and Resolution Plans (RRP) - WDesk integrates documentation required for financial statements, risk assessment and forecasts required by the Sarbanes–Oxley Act into a single view.
- SEC and ESEF Filing - including EDGAR HTML conversion and XBRL mapping, creating and filing documentation for IPOs, S-1s, 10Ks, 10-Qs, 20-Fs for SEC, as well as the reports needed to meet Investor Relations, mutual fund and European Single Electronic Format reporting in line with the European Securities and Markets Authority ESMA.
- CAFR and State and Local Reporting - used by municipal securities issuers or agents for preparing documentation for Continuing Disclosures to the Municipal Securities Rulemaking Board and documentation required of state and local education departments to meet mandated guidelines.
- ESG, Sustainability and Corporate Social Responsibility (CSR) - WDesk supports most global reporting frameworks that track CSR including Global Responsibility Index, the Carbon Disclosure Project and the Dow Jones Sustainability Indices.
- Internal Reporting - these tasks include compiling management reports, risk assessments, board reports, among others.

Workiva's reporting software was created for executives that want to integrate data from different systems, and desire software that updates automatically.

European companies use Wdesk to comply with European Securities and Markets Authority’s reporting mandates.

Global Legal Entity Identifier (GLEIF) deployed the Workiva platform to create their annual report which was then showcased by ESMA as a paragon for European Single Electronic Format (ESEF)-compliance reporting.

In September 2021, Workiva formed a partnership with Wilson Sonsini (WSGR), a premier legal firm, to automate the generation of the SEC Form S-1. The new application is known as the WS-1 and helps reduce the time needed to prepare IPO statements.
