= Backlash (sociology) =

Strong adverse reaction to an idea, action, or object

A backlash is a strong negative or hostile reaction to a particular idea, action, trend, or social change. It often arises when individuals or groups perceive a threat to their values, status, or power. In sociopolitical contexts, particularly within identity politics in the Western world, the term is frequently used to describe reactions against efforts to advance the rights or visibility of marginalized groups.

Backlashes can manifest as public opposition, policy reversals, or cultural resistance, and are often viewed as attempts to restore a previous social or political order. Scholars sometimes interpret backlash not as a denial of change, but as a response driven by perceived loss, resentment, or fear of displacement.

== Historical Western examples ==
- 13th Amendment — Jim Crow Laws were racial backlash in response to the amendment to the United States constitution.
- Civil rights — Voting restrictions implemented.
- Women's Movement — Backlash centered on infertility issues, women's "biological clock" and shortage of men.

== Contemporary Western examples ==
- Me Too Movement — Impacted women in the workforce. Men were more reluctant to hire women deemed attractive, more reluctant to have one-on-one meetings with women, and had greater fears of being unfairly accused. In addition to this, 56% of women surveyed predicted that men would continue to harass them but would be more cautious to avoid being caught. Backlash of date-rape prevalent with misleading language used in media. In 1987 it was called an "epidemic" and in 1993, "rape hype"; terms that were exaggerated and victim oriented.
- Abortion — Defund Planned Parenthood Act
  - "This bill temporarily restricts federal funding for Planned Parenthood Federation of America, Inc. Specifically, the bill prohibits, for a one-year period, the availability of federal funds for any purpose to this entity, or any of its affiliates or clinics, unless they certify that the affiliates and clinics will not perform, and will not provide any funds to any other entity that performs, an abortion during such period. This restriction does not apply in cases of rape or incest or where a physical condition endangers a woman's life unless an abortion is performed.
- LGBT backlash — Bathroom bills and medical bans are proposed to restrict the rights of transgender youth and adults. Arguments center around fair play in sports and sexual harassment in bathrooms.
- Black Lives Matter — White Lives Matter, and All Lives Matter campaigns created in response.
- Bikelash — A colloquial term about the social and political resistance to the creation of urban infrastructure intended to accommodate safer cycling, seemingly at the expense of the use of automobiles.

== See also ==
- EDSA III
- Estallido social
- Feminazi
- Straight pride
- White backlash
- Yellow vests movement
- Blue Lives Matter
- Angry young man (South Korea)
- Anger
- Reactionary
- Greenlash
