= Regulation of ESG rating in the European Union =

First regulation of ESG rating in the EU

Regulation 2023/0177 (COD)
- European Union regulation
- Title: Regulation of the European Parliament and of the Council on the transparency and integrity of Environmental, Social and Governance (ESG) rating activities
- Made by: European Parliament & Council of the EU
- Made under: Art.114

History
- Date made: 2023-06-13
- Entry into force: —

Regulation of ESG rating in the European Union is a proposed European Union regulation on environmental, social, and corporate governance (ESG) rating activities' transparency and integrity to improve clarity in the EU's ESG rating processes. The regulation was first designed after 2020 and an amended draft was published in 2023.

The focus for the proposed regulation is on transparency rather than a uniform methodology of ESG rating providers (ERP). It details a set of definitions on the ESG rating key players, necessary disclosures and requirements for third country ERP and a supervision framework under ESMA's umbrella, which is set to become the sole ESG rating supervisor in the EU.

Following the ordinary legislative procedure with the Council of the European Union and its preparatory bodies, an amended version of the proposal was published on July 14, 2023. This revised proposal was subsequently presented to the European Parliament for its first reading. Its adoption, in its current form or with minimal amendments, is anticipated to be a crucial step in sustainable finance regulation in the EU and worldwide.

== History ==
The European Union's planned a comprehensive approach, comprising regulations, directives, and proposals aligned with the 2020 Green Deal package and the EU Sustainable Finance Action Plan.

Between 2018 and 2022, the European commission accumulates a total of 574 in-force legislations regarding ESG. This proposal of regulation pushes forward problematic on ESG rating reliability and their safeguards.

Among this package of initiatives, the EU taxonomy regulation and its delegated acts aims to classify sectors and activities on their greenness and whether they are "Taxonomy-aligned", "Taxonomy-eligible" or have a "transition exposure"( Allessi & Battiston, 2023). It depends thus on 2 axis: the level of transparency and disclosure of information, and the adequacy of the per se disclosed content to sustainable indicators updated through delegated acts.

To enhance disclosures the Non-Financial Reporting Directive (NFRD) was revised by the Corporate sustainability reporting directive (CSRD) in January 2023. This amendment expanded the scope of non-financial reporting to encompass nearly all companies, with a few exceptions, and introduced more detailed disclosure requirements.

In February 2023, the Sustainable Finance Disclosure Regulation (SFRD) pushes through this momentum and applies filters onto to all financial market participants (FMP) as well as their financial products as to categorize them as "Light Green" if they are broadly ESG-related (article 8) or "Dark Green" (article 9) if they are fully committed to sustainability matters.

In the same line, since November 2023, the EU green bond standards regulation (EuGBS) adds up and guarantees that the profits made on green bonds sells are effectively directed towards "taxonomy-aligned activities" and ESMA's oversight.

Under the current system, self-regulated and based on voluntary disclosure, the information produced by companies and ratings firms is often incomplete and inconsistent. The SFDR and NFDR/CSRD aim to gear toward more compulsoriness. When ESG disclosure become mandatory, standards become clearer, and reporting becomes more consistent and comparable.

The incoming regulation on the transparency and integrity of ESG rating activities (proposal in June 2023; adoption by mid-2024) is now willing to enhance transparency, integrity, quality and independence of ESG Rating providers (ERP) and supervise their activities.

It aims to shackle potential greenwashing linked to these infomediaries.

== Content ==
In the proposal, a special part should be regulated for the extension of the regulation to third-country providers in the EU. Secondly, it should outline conditions for ESG ratings in the EU. The new regulation should prescribe ESMA to maintain an approved ESG rating providers register. It should outline the ESMA's supervisory powers and cooperation with national authorities. Final articles should grant the Commission authority for delegated acts as it was the case for the EU taxonomy.

=== Scope ===
The current Proposal does not distinguish between public and private companies that can provide ESG ratings.

Regarding the global aspect of the ESG rating activities, the regulation will apply for both EU and non-EU companies with a relative ease on small and medium undertakings largely represented by EU raters. It is expected that the regulation obligations will have an impact on small providers with some administrative burden and costs of organizational changes, but on the other hand notable benefit for the small providers should be better visibility and reputation gain.

EU central banks are exempted and the ECB favorably welcomed this exclusion as to create its own ESG ratings awaiting for private ERP to be more reliable.

It won't neither apply to non-lucrative ESG rating issuers such as the Carbon Disclosure Project (CDP) as these are highly trusted into giving more accurate data than lucrative issuers.

=== Defining the basics ===
Finding a clear definition of ESG rating is challenging. Recent efforts to define the concept stemmed from EU financial supervisors or official texts from institutions that failed to find a consensus yet. ESMA (2021), in its letter to the European Commission, proposed the following broad definition when introducing their suggestion of a regulation on ESG rating activities :

"ESG rating means an opinion regarding an entity, issuer, or debt security's impact on or exposure to ESG factors, alignment with international climatic agreements or sustainability characteristics, issued using a defined ranking system of rating categories."

The current proposal for a regulation on the transparency and integrity of ESG rating activities (2023), at the core of this article, builds upon that pushing forward in its definition as following:

"An opinion, a score or a combination of both, regarding an entity, a financial instrument, a financial product, or an undertaking's ESG profile or characteristics or exposure to ESG risks or the impact on people, society and the environment, that are based on an established methodology and defined ranking system of rating categories and that are provided to third parties, irrespective of whether such ESG rating is explicitly labelled as 'rating' or 'ESG score". (article 3, Proposal on the transparency and integrity of Environmental, Social and Governance (ESG) rating activities regulation).

Both sources corroborate that ESG ratings assess the environmental, social, and governance characteristics, exposures to ESG risks or the impact on the environment and society in general of an entity, a financial instrument or a financial product, through a set of methodologies that can nevertheless differ. Thus, the regulation acknowledges and maintains the diversity of opinions and flexibility of ESG ratings, rather than a harmonizing measurement.

This contrast on the basic definitions highlights the difficulty surrounding the regulation of ESG rating providers and is still subject to thorough discussions by the European Parliament and the Council

Adopting clear definitions are key to regulation of the ESG ecosystem thus the need to define an ESG rating provider, the requirements needed to be met in this regard, the enforceability measures of this regulatory framework and the compliance supervision handed to ESMA.

=== ESMA's supervision ===
According to the Commission proposal, conducting ESG ratings will require legal entities to apply for authorization to the European Securities and Markets (ESMA).

Apart from granting authorisation to provide ESG ratings in the EU, the proposal confers supervisory powers to ESMA. In order to carry out its supervisory competence, ESMA may require relevant persons to provide all information necessary to carry out its supervisory duties. The proposal defines the scope of the relevant persons rather broadly, including:

- ESG rating providers.
- Persons involved in ESG rating activities.
- Rated entities, third parties to whom the ESG rating providers have outsourced operational functions or activities.
- Persons otherwise closely and substantially related or connected to ESG rating providers or ESG rating activities.

The relevant persons are obliged to provide the requested information.

ESMA may also conduct necessary investigations of relevant persons. The right to carry out general investigations includes:

- Examination of records, data, procedures, and any other material relevant to the execution of its tasks.
- Obtaining certified copies of or extracts from such records, data, procedures, and other material.
- Requesting relevant persons or their representatives or staff to provide explanations on facts or documents related to the subject matter and purpose of the inspection, including interviews (with consent of such person).
- Requesting records of phone and data traffic.

In order to carry out its duties, ESMA may conduct on-site inspections at the business premises of the relevant legal persons, possibly also without prior announcement.

Administrative sanctions and other administrative measures

According to the proposal, ESMA has the competence to take supervisory measures where it finds that an ESG rating provider has not complied with its obligations. These include:

- Withdrawal of the authorisation of the ESG rating provider.
- Temporary prohibition of the ESG rating provider from providing ESG ratings, until the infringement has ceased.
- Suspension of the use of the ESG ratings provided by the ESG rating provider, until the infringement has ceased.
- Requesting the ESG rating provider to end the infringement.
- Imposing fines.
- Issuing public notices.

When taking the supervisory measures, ESMA shall consider the nature and seriousness of the infringement. The measures must be in any case effective, proportionate, and dissuasive.

The proposal introduces periodic penalty payments as an instrument to compel ESG ratings providers or the relevant persons to comply with previously issued decisions, requests for information, or investigation and inspections.

The proposal also grants a right to review by the Court of Justice where ESMA has imposed a fine or a periodic penalty payment. The Court shall have competence to review such decision and may annul, reduce, or increase the fine or periodic penalty payment.

=== Third countries ERP in the EU ===
ESG rating provider comes from a third country, it will have to fulfil the following requirements, once it has informed ESMA of its intention to conduct ESG rating activities in the EU. The conditions are as follows :

- Provide a legal representative and indicating the name of the competent authority responsible for the supervision of the Non-EU ERP. This way keeping track of the market and coordinating global policies are facilitated.
- The European Commission needs to adopt an equivalence decision for the third country authority or delegate to ESMA authorization on a case-by-case basis.
- A cooperation arrangement with the competent authorities of the third country is found. This might foster international cooperation and information exchange for better future planning.
- Other ERP can be endorsed by previously authorized members.

When authorized, the information on the identity of ESG rating providers that have received authorization, recognition or that complied to the proposed Equivalence Regulation will be available in the European Single Access Point (ESAP).

=== Quality, integrity, independence, and transparency ===
Studies like Miller's (2002) or Kuncoro's (2011) confirms that transparency has a great impact on companies, investors, creditors, and information intermediaries in the capital market, specifically helping to reduce information asymmetry. In this regard, the proposal requires ESG rating providers to:

- Provide proof of knowledge and past expertise in ESG rating.
- Publish on ERP websites methodologies, models and assumptions essential to guide the investors' decisional process.
- Gather information on the European Single Access point.
- Commit to record at least 5 years of ESG activities.

The integrity of ESG, on ESMA's surveillance, require the EU agency's tasks are not hampered by any mean and therefore the future Eu ERP would be asked to:

- Put on place complaint handling mechanisms.
- Not outsource as it impairs the judgement of ESMA and can threaten the report quality.
- None of the rating agency can undergo consulting, investments, Audit, Banking, reinsurance, credit rating activities nor elaborations of green benchmarks.
