= GRESB =

ESG benchmark

- Type: Private company
- Industry: Environmental economics
- Founded: 2009; 17 years ago
- Founders: Group of pension funds and Maastricht University
- Headquarters: Amsterdam, Netherlands
- Area served: Worldwide
- Products: Sustainability assessments
- Owner: GRESB not-for-profit foundation
- Website: www.gresb.com

GRESB is a Netherlands-based company that operates an annual sustainability assessment for standing real estate investments, real estate projects in development, infrastructure funds, and infrastructure assets. From these assessments, it provides standardized and validated environmental, social, and governance (ESG) data and benchmarks for the real assets investment community. Some academic research papers have demonstrated that GRESB participation is a predicator of fund-level financial returns.

== History and organizational structure ==
GRESB was established in 2009 as a collaboration between a group of pension funds and Maastricht University to assess the sustainability of real estate fund managers, later expanding into infrastructure. In 2014 the company was acquired by GBCI and then sold in 2020 through a management buyout in conjunction with Summit Partners. In 2024, General Atlantic acquired a majority stake in GRESB.

Today, GRESB is a certified B Corp with an associated but independent not-for-profit foundation that owns and governs the ESG standards upon which the GRESB assessments are based.

== Assessment structure and impact ==
The annual results and benchmarks from GRESB's real estate and infrastructure assessments are used by fund managers to better understand their portfolio's relative performance against peers and by investors looking for standardized disclosures into a fund or firm's ESG strategies and performance. Recent scholarship suggests that over the past few years there has been significant adoption of and reporting to GRESB within the real estate industry and that GRESB participation and performance are both significant predicators of cross-sectoral fund returns. The relationship between GRESB, its foundation, and the industry representatives that sit on the foundation's board has been criticized as allowing investors too much freedom to set the standards that funds are evaluated against.

== Indices ==
The GRESB Global Sustainable Index was launched in 2006, while the iEdge-UOB APAC Green REIT index was launched in 2021.
