= Shareholder democracy =

Corporate governance concept

Shareholder democracy is a concept relating to the governance structure of modern corporations. In this structure, shareholders bear ultimate controlling authority over the corporation, as they are the owners and may exercise control within their economic rights. Although shareholders own the corporation, they generally take a passive interest in managing the day-to-day operations of the company. Shareholders who are interested in actively influencing corporate affairs are called activist shareholders.

In the American system of corporate governance, shareholders typically elect the company's board of directors on an annual basis. These directors bear a fiduciary responsibility to the shareholders and must represent the interests of the shareholders (as opposed to the interests of themselves or any third parties) when making decisions. In turn, the board may select the individual executives and officers who operate the company, and they may also act on behalf of the corporation when establishing company policy for products, services, wages, and labor relations. This structure is akin to the political model of representative democracy, whereby citizens may elect political representatives to serve in public office. Similarly, the directors and shareholders face the principal-agent problem, where the directors may fail to properly represent the interests of the shareholders and may be in violation of their legal fiduciary obligations. Passive shareholders may disengage from the shareholder democracy model, a phenomenon known as shareholder apathy.

== Origins ==
One of the earliest uses of the term shareholder democracy is noted in Volume V of William Meade Fletcher's Cyclopedia of the Law of Private Corporations from 1931. The term was also used multiple times during a 1955 U.S. Senate Hearing on Stock Market Study. Usage of the term has increased tremendously from 1928, when it first came into use.

Perhaps the greatest proponents of shareholder democracy were Lewis and John Gilbert, two of the earliest activist shareholders in modern finance. The Gilbert brothers are credited with two key features of modern shareholder rights: 1) the ability to ratify the appointment of outside auditors and 2) the right to submit shareholder proposals that would be put to a vote at shareholder meetings. These rights came as a result of the brothers' campaign against Transamerica Corporation in 1946, which led to SEC rulings in their favor that were later upheld by the U.S. Court of Appeals.

Commenting on the 1947 case SEC v. Transamerica, Lewis Gilbert wrote, "A corporation is run for the benefit of its shareholders and not that of its management." To some extent, Gilbert's conception of the corporation is resembles that of noted economist Milton Friedman, in what has come to be known as the Friedman doctrine or shareholder theory. In 1956, Lewis Gilbert published a book on his experiences and views titled Dividends and Democracy.

Professor of History Colleen Dunlavy writes about the history of corporate governance in an article From Citizens to Plutocrats: Nineteenth-century Shareholder Voting Rights and Theories of the Corporation. Dunlavy notes that corporations were originally governed on the basis of the one-vote-per-shareholder rule, similar to an egalitarian democracy. She identifies a change from this original principle to the modern one-vote-per-share rule, which more closely resembles a plutocracy. Dunlavy claims this transition occurred throughout the mid-19th century and was a distinctly American phenomenon. She notes that as a result of corporations inherently being market institutions, "In theory, a shareholder's voting power is in proportion to her property rights in the corporation; the larger her stake, the greater her influence."

== Modern Application ==
In a 2019 New York Times article titled How Shareholder Democracy Failed the People, Andrew Ross Sorkin writes about how shareholder primacy in company decision-making has led to a general disregard for stakeholders and other important interests.

In November 2021, the Securities and Exchange Commission (SEC) provided new guidelines that made it easier for shareholders to submit proposals on environmental and social issues. The moves were made in accordance with a renewed emphasis on the concept of shareholder democracy by the new Chair Gary Gensler.

On November 17, 2021, the SEC adopted new rules for universal proxy cards in contested director elections. The new rules give shareholders who are voting by proxy the ability to vote for any combination of candidates being nominated to the board, as opposed to having to choose from either the list provided by the company or by proxy solicitations. Commenting on the new rules, SEC Chairman Gary Gensler noted that, "These amendments address concerns that shareholders voting by proxy cannot vote for a mix of dissident and registrant nominees in an election contest, as they could if voted in person. Today's amendments will put these candidates on the same ballot. They will put investors voting in person and by proxy on equal footing. This is an important aspect of shareholder democracy."
