= Greenwashing =

Deceptive marketing about environmentalism

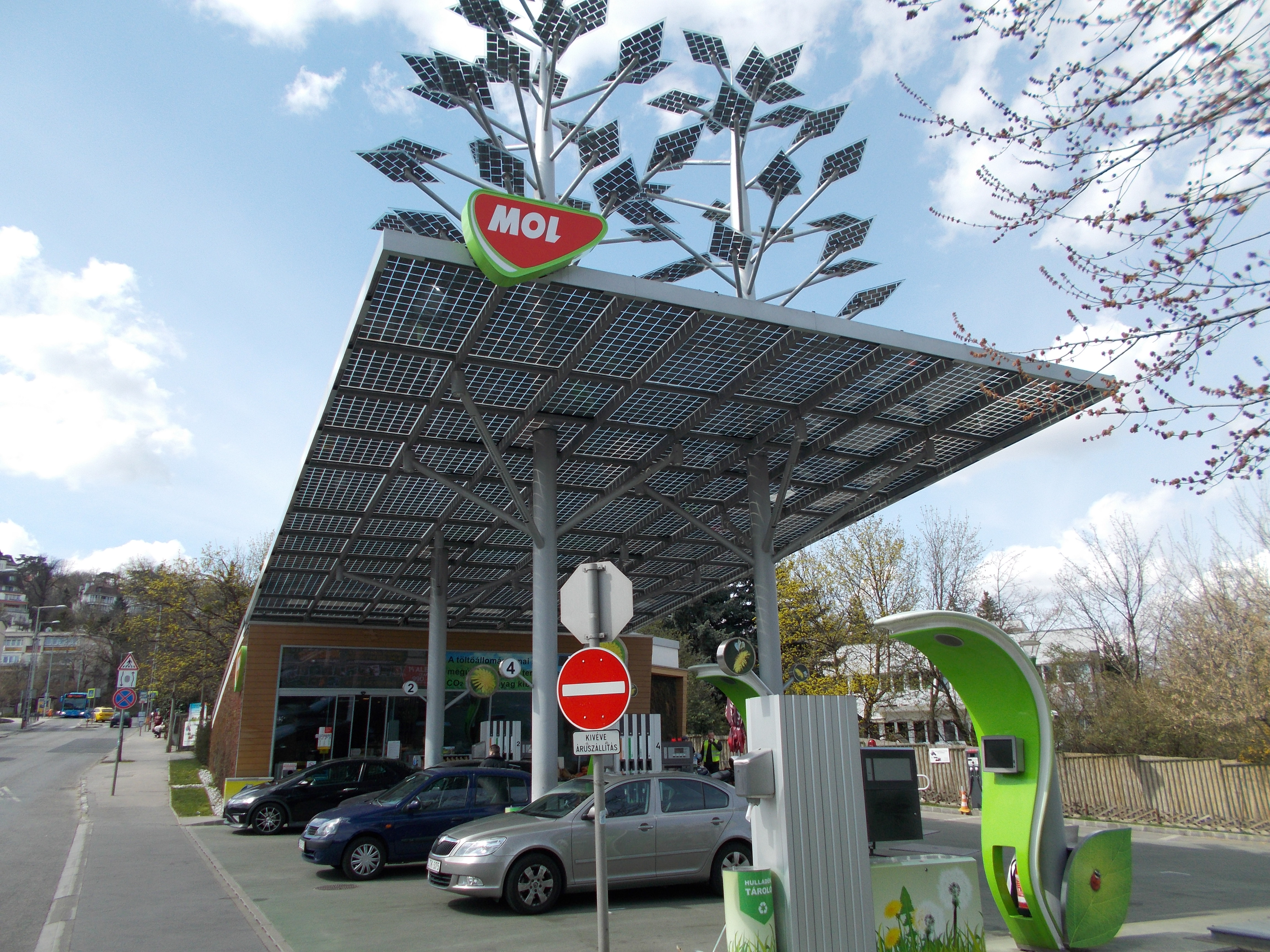
Solar-powered petrol station in Budapest, Hungary. The usage of renewables in this fuel station improves the image of an otherwise environmentally destructive industry.

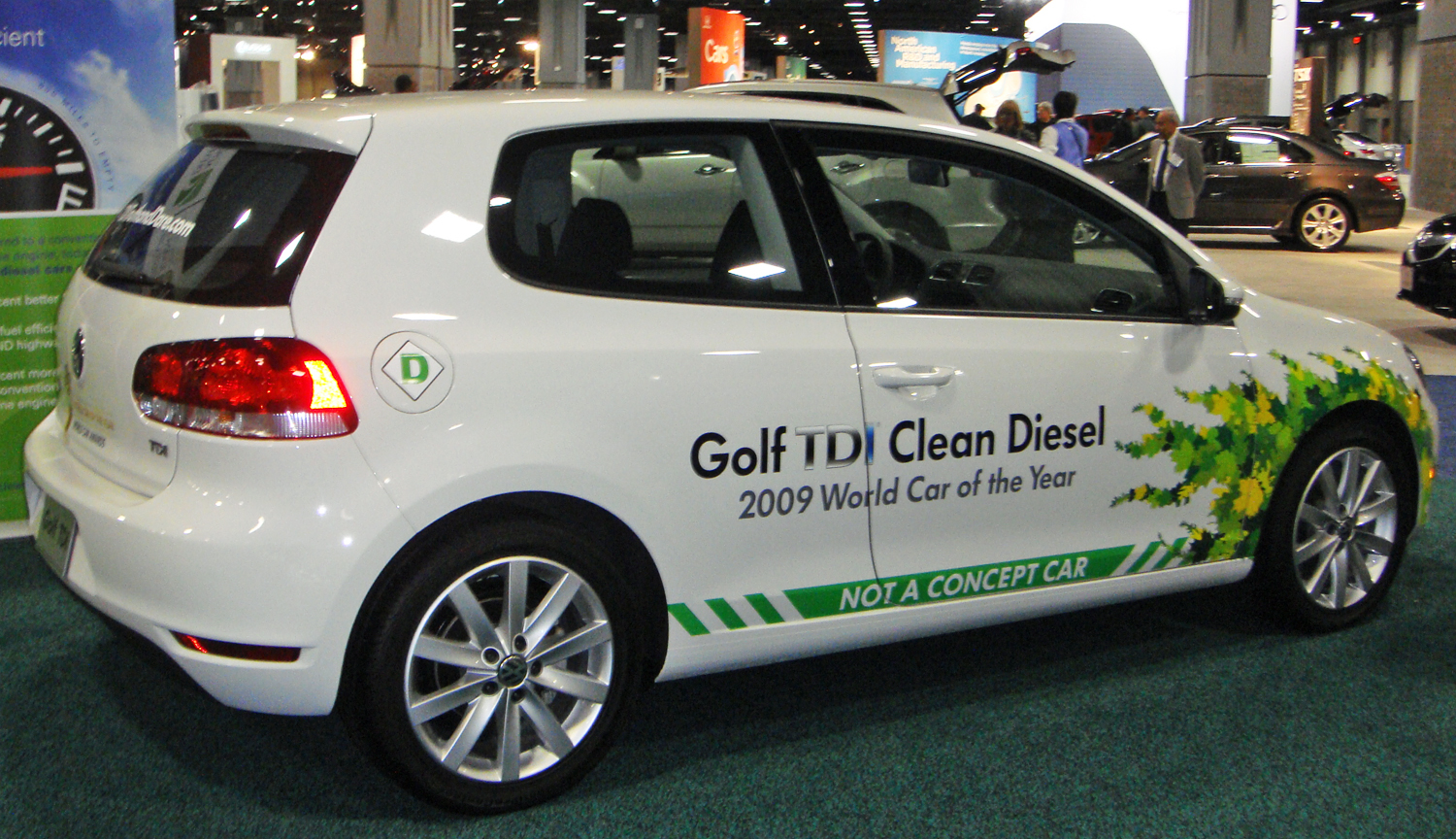
A Volkswagen Golf TDI in 2010, featuring the phrase "clean diesel" (a type of fuel, also known as ultra-low-sulfur diesel). The company later faced scrutiny and conviction due to an emissions scandal.

Greenwashing, or Green Sheen, is any advertisement or PR campaign designed to deceive the public into thinking an organization's products, goals, or policies are environmentally friendly. The term is a compound of 'Green' and 'Whitewashing'.

Firms engage in greenwashing for three primary reasons: to gain legitimacy among people concerned for the environment, to project an image of environmental responsibility or broader sustainability to the wider public, and to distance themselves from their environmental lapses or those of their suppliers.

Since there is no universally agreed definition of greenwashing, determining whether a given instance is or isn't greenwashing can be challenging for consumers and regulatory bodies. The term is subjective, and depends on interpreting an action as genuine or purely concerned with boosting an organization's image.

A common rule of thumb for determining if an organization is greenwashing is whether an organization spends significantly more resources on advertising a 'green' image than actually doing environmentally sound practices.

== Occurrence ==
Many corporations use greenwashing to improve public opinion of their brands, and to capitalize on consumers' environmental guilt. Corporations with complex structures can further obscure the bigger picture of their operations, and allow for more clever ways to cover up unsustainable corporate agendas and policies.

Critics of the practice suggest that the rise of greenwashing, combined with ineffective regulation and lack of its actual enforcement, contributes to consumer skepticism of all green claims and diminishes the power of consumer choice to influence companies toward greener manufacturing processes and business operations. Highly public accusations of greenwashing have contributed to the term's increasing use.

Moreover, the act of greenwashing directly undermines "green trust" in consumers, which also harms the credibility and profitability of the company making a real effort to be green. Green marketing, when legitimate, can serve as a competitive advantage. But its misuse as greenwashing can lead to the company being perceived as morally irresponsible, damaging its reputation.

Greenwashing has recently increased to artificially meet consumer demand for environmentally-friendly goods and services. New regulations, laws, and guidelines put forward by organizations such as the Committee of Advertising Practice in the UK aim to discourage companies from using greenwashing to deceive consumers. At the same time, activists have been increasingly inclined to accuse companies of greenwashing, with inconsistent standards as to what activities merit such an accusation.

== Characteristics ==
Activities deemed to be characteristic of greenwashing can vary by time and place, product, and the opinions or expectations of the person making the determination.

According to the United Nations, greenwashing can present itself in many ways, such as claiming that the company will achieve future environment milestones while not putting sufficient plans in place to do so, being intentionally vague about operations or using vague claims that cannot be specifically proven (like saying they are "environmentally friendly" or "green"), saying that a product does not contain harmful materials or use harmful practices that they would not use anyways, highlighting one thing the company does well regarding the environment while not doing anything else, and promoting products that meet regulatory minimums as if peer products do not.

Additionally, TerraChoice, an environmental consulting division of UL, described the "seven sins of greenwashing" in 2007 to "help consumers identify products that made misleading environmental claims":

- "Hidden Trade-off", which claims a product is "green" based on an unreasonably narrow set of attributes without attention to other critical environmental issues.
- "No proof", a claim that cannot be substantiated by easily accessible information or a reliable third-party certification.
- "Vagueness" is a poorly defined or broad claim that the consumer will likely misunderstand, such as 'all-natural.'
- "Worshipping False Labels", which is a claim that, through words or images, gives the impression of a third-party endorsement where none exists.
- "Irrelevance", which is a claim that may be truthful but unimportant or unhelpful to consumers seeking environmentally preferable products.
- "Lesser of Two Evils", a claim that may be true within the product category, but risks distracting consumers from the more significant environmental impact of the category.
- "Fibbing", which is a claim that is simply false.

Considering these ways of identifying greenwashing, TerraChoice noted that by 2010, approximately 95% of consumer products in the U.S. claiming to be green were discovered to commit at least one of these sins.

The characteristics and concept of greenwashing are vaguely defined, and some only consider environmental claims, while others also factor in deception regarding corporate social responsibility (CSR). Additionally, scholars make a distinction between an object's attributes view, which focuses on whether a product's environmental claims align with its features, and the process attribute view, which examines whether the firm's environmental efforts match its promotional efforts.

== Types of greenwashing ==
Greenwashing can take different forms, which change depending on where and how the environmental misconduct or environmental claim occurs within an organization or its supply chain. These types change how stakeholders blame, judge, and decide whether to support or even invest in a firm.

The first type is direct greenwashing, which occurs when a firm's own processes are inconsistent with its environmental claims and lead to blaming the entire company and having low intention to invest.

The second type is indirect greenwashing, which happens when a supplier makes false environmental claims, thus the company it supplies is also negatively impacted and is blamed even though the company itself did not commit any misconduct.

The third type is vicarious greenwashing, which occurs when a "green" company partners with a non-environmentally friendly supplier. In this case the company is held liable for the supplier's misconduct because of its stated commitment to sustainability.

Additionally, some scholars argue that the more internal and intentional the greenwashing, the more blame and less investment the company receives.

Greenwashing can also take different forms depending on whether it is on a firm-level or a product-level.

"Product-level greenwashing" mainly focuses on the products or services provided by the company. On this level, "claim greenwashing" occurs when there is a use of misleading statements about the environmental benefits and vague, unverified, and false certifications such as "eco-friendly". Moreover, "executional greenwashing" happens when companies rely on visuals and symbols, such as green colors and nature imagery, that connect to sustainability and mislead consumers into believing that a product is more ecological than it is. These tactics, which are also known as the "sins of greenwashing", tend to hide the negative impacts and diminish the consumer trust.

On the other hand, "firm-level greenwashing" happens at the organizational level, for example when a firm uses advertising and campaigns to promote sustainability while still having operations that damage the environment. This misleads the reputation and image of corporate responsibility, which confuses consumers through both words and imagery, leading to marketing deception on authentic environmental efforts.

More generally, and in the physical world, the term "beauty strip" is used pejoratively to describe the practice of hiding unsightly logging, mining and other extractive land uses with a "beauty strip" of trees or other tall vegetation, perhaps even required by government to maintain community aesthetics.

== History ==
The origins of greenwashing can be traced to several different moments. For example, Keep America Beautiful was a campaign founded by beverage manufacturers and others in 1953. The campaign focused on recycling and littering, diverting attention away from corporate responsibility to protect the environment. The objective was to forestall the regulation of disposable containers, such as the one established by Vermont.

In the mid-1960s, the environmental movement gained momentum, particularly after the publication of the landmark Silent Spring by Rachel Carson. The book marked a turning point in environmental awareness and inspired citizen action. It prompted many companies to seek a new, cleaner or greener image through advertising, although others, like E. Bruce Harrison, known as the father of modern greenwashing, sought to defame Carson and disparage the message of her book. Jerry Mander, a former Madison Avenue advertising executive, called this new form of advertising "ecopornography."

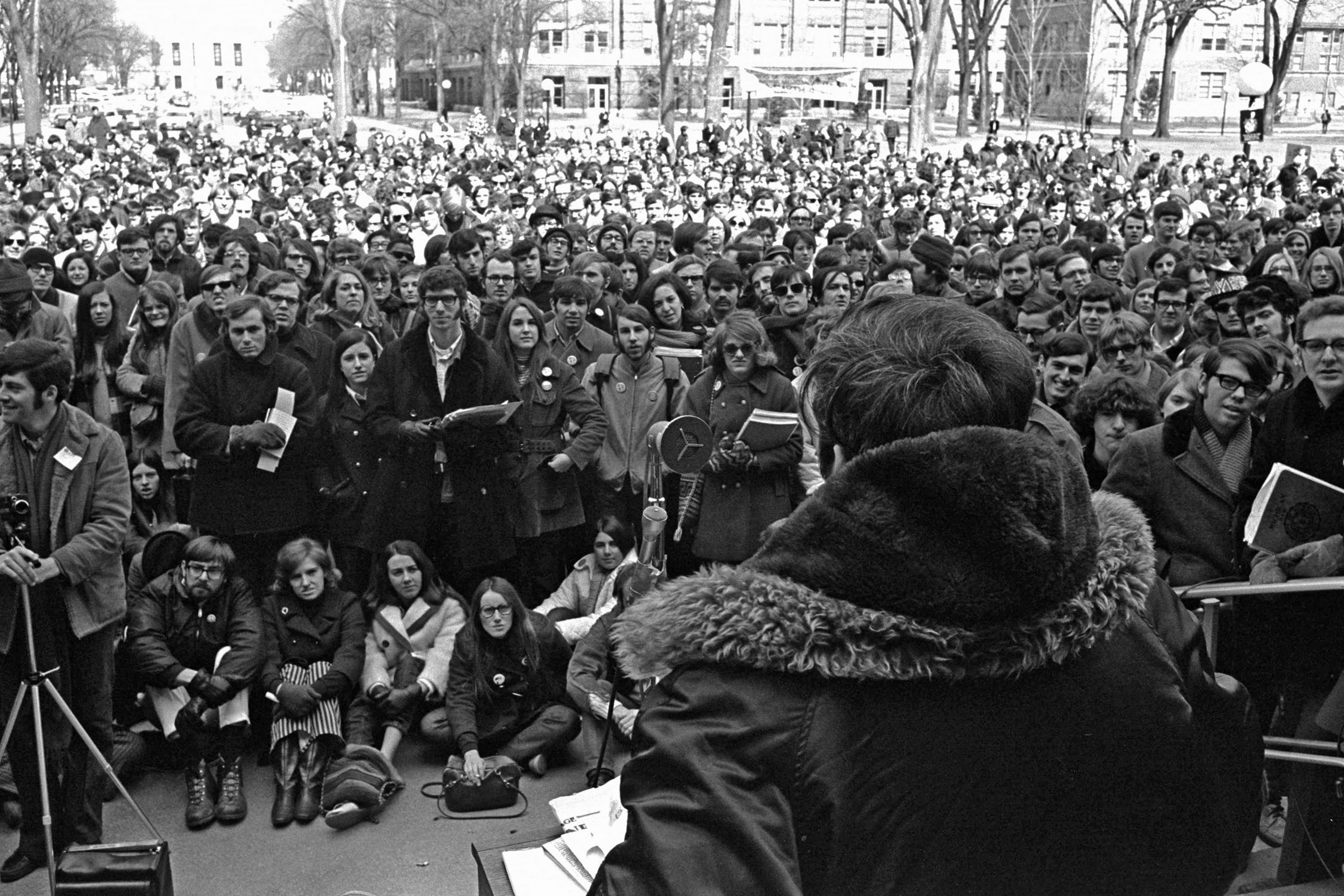
Earth Day 1970

The first Earth Day was held on 22 April 1970. Most companies did not actively participate in the initial Earth Day events because environmental issues were not a major corporate priority, and there was a sense of skepticism or resistance to the movement's message. Nevertheless, some industries began to advertise themselves as environmentally friendly. For example, public utilities were estimated to have spent around $300 million advertising themselves as clean and green companies, which was eight times what they spent on pollution reduction research.

The term "greenwashing" was coined by New York environmentalist Jay Westerveld in a 1986 essay about the hotel industry's hypocritical practice of placing notices in bedrooms promoting the reuse of towels to "save the environment". He noted that these institutions often made little or no effort toward reducing energy waste, although towel reuse saved them laundry costs. He concluded that the fundamental objective was most frequently increased profit. He labeled this and other profitable-but-ineffective "environmentally-conscientious" acts as "greenwashing", introducing properly the term as the act of a company appearing more environmentally friendly than it actually is, often through selective disclosure, misleading advertising, or exaggerated claims.

In 1991, a study published in the "Journal of Public Policy and Marketing" (American Marketing Association) found that 58% of environmental ads had at least one deceptive claim. Another study found that 77% of people said a company's environmental reputation affected whether they would buy its products. One-fourth of all household products marketed around Earth Day advertised themselves as being green and environmentally friendly. In 1998, the Federal Trade Commission created the "Green Guidelines", which defined terms used in environmental marketing. The following year, the FTC ruled that the Nuclear Energy Institute's claims of environmental cleanliness were invalid. However, the FTC took no action regarding the ads because they fell outside the agency's jurisdiction. This caused the FTC to realize they needed new, clear, enforceable standards. In 1999, the word "greenwashing" was added to the "Oxford English Dictionary."

Days before the 1992 Earth Summit in Rio de Janeiro, Greenpeace released The Greenpeace Book on Greenwash, which described the corporate takeover of the UN conference and provided case studies of the contrast between corporate polluters and their rhetoric. Third World Network published an expanded version of that report, "Greenwash: The Reality Behind Corporate Environmentalism", in 1996.

In 2002, during the World Summit on Sustainable Development in Johannesburg, the Greenwashing Academy hosted the Greenwash Academy Awards. The ceremony awarded companies like BP, ExxonMobil, and even the U.S. Government for their elaborate greenwashing ads and support for greenwashing. A 2020 European Union study found that over 50% of examined environmental claims in the EU were vague, misleading, or unfounded, while 40% of them were unsubstantiated.

Many companies have committed to reducing their greenhouse gas emissions to net zero after the Paris Agreement was signed in 2015. A net zero emissions level means that any emissions given off by a company would be offset by carbon sequestrators in the natural world (also known as carbon sinks). However, companies are not actually cutting emissions, but are creating unfeasible plans and attempting to improve other things rather than their emissions. Therefore, most companies are not actually upholding their agreements and ultimately continue not to cause any positive change.

== Examples ==
=== Social media and influencers ===
- In February 2022, the UK's Advertising Standards Authority (ASA) upheld complaints about Innocent Drinks advertisements on YouTube, television and video-on-demand services. It found that they misleadingly suggested that buying the drinks would benefit the environment. Innocent said the campaign encouraged environmental action and recycling, but the ASA found insufficient evidence of a positive environmental impact across the products' lifecycles.
- In August 2023, DeSmog reported that Canadian Instagram influencers had promoted Shell's "Drive Carbon Neutral" carbon-offsetting programme. Gregory Trencher, an associate professor at Kyoto University, described these promotions as part of a broader greenwashing strategy portraying Shell as a leader in the energy transition. Shell defended its marketing, saying that informing customers about its low-carbon products and investments was a legitimate activity.

=== Fashion industry ===
- Kimberly-Clark's claim of "Pure and Natural" diapers in green packaging. The product uses organic cotton on the outside but utilizes the same petrochemical gel inside as before. Pampers also claims that "Dry Max" diapers reduce landfills by decreasing the amount of paper fluff in the diaper, but also a way to trim product and to save money in producing Pampers.
- In January 2020, the Fur Free Alliance noted that the "WelFur" label, which advocated for animal welfare on fur farms, is run by the fur industry and is aimed at European fur farms.
- Clothing company H&M came under fire for greenwashing their manufacturing practices as a result of a report published by Quartz News. Despite H&M adopting initiatives such as "H&M Conscious" to promote eco-friendly clothes, the Norwegian Consumer Agency debunked their claims as false and illegal due to the corporation's lack of concrete action.

=== Food industry ===
- In 2009, McDonald's changed the color of its European logos from yellow-and-red to yellow-and-green; a spokesman explained that the change was "to clarify [their] responsibility for the preservation of natural resources". In October 2021 McDonald's was accused of greenwashing after announcing its pledge to reach net-zero emissions by 2050.
- In 2018, in response to increased calls to ban plastic straws, Starbucks introduced a lid with a built-in drinking straw that contained more plastic by weight than the old straw and lid together (though it can be recycled, unlike its predecessor).
- In 2020, Coca-Cola was found to be the world's number one plastic polluter by Break Free From Plastic. However, the company continues to say that it is making headway in lessening plastic waste. They say they have a commitment to "get every bottle back by 2030" despite being the biggest plastic polluter for several years in a row. They were sued by the Earth Island Institute in 2021 for their false claims.
- In 2026, a third-party lab test found that linoleic acid made up roughly 23% of the fat in Vital Farms' eggs, higher than in eggs of forage-raised hens. Vital Farms faced allegations of greenwashing and consumer backlash over the feed practices.

=== Automobile industry ===
- The UK Advertising Standards Authority upheld complaints against major vehicle manufacturers, including Suzuki, SEAT, Toyota, and Lexus who made false claims about their vehicles.
- Volkswagen fitted their cars with a "defeat device" that activated only when a car's emissions were being tested to reduce polluting emissions. In normal use, by contrast, the cars were emitting 40 times the allowed rate of nitrogen oxide. Forbes estimates that this scandal cost Volkswagen US$35.4 billion. Other automakers also cheated on emissions systems.
- In November 2020, Aston Martin, Bosch, and other brands were discovered to have funded a report which downplayed electric vehicles' environmental benefits with misleading information about the CO_{2} emissions produced during the manufacture of electric cars, in response to the UK announcing that it would ban the sale of vehicles with internal combustion engines by 2030. The greenwashing scandal became known as Astongate, given the relationship between the British automotive manufacturer and Clarendon Communications, a shell company posing as a public relations agency which was set up to promote the report, and which was registered to James Michael Stephens, the Director of Global Government & Corporate Affairs at Aston Martin Lagonda Ltd.
- Calling the next provisionally approved European emission standards for light and medium vehicles "Euro 7" instead of "Euro 6f" could be considered greenwashing because of unchanged pollutant limits.
- Calling start-stop systems "micro" hybrid.
- "Mild" or "smart" hybrids.
- Calling hybrid vehicles "self-charging" or "..., driven by electric."
- The fleet of PHEVs underperforms on emissions reductions. However, they would have more potential if properly used.
- Fuel cell vehicles powered by non-green hydrogen.

=== Transport industry ===
- In February 2020, the UK's Advertising Standards Authority banned Ryanair advertisements claiming that it was Europe's lowest-emissions airline. The ASA found that the basis of the comparison was insufficiently explained and substantiated; evidence submitted by Ryanair included a 2011 ranking used to support claims made in 2019.
- In 2024, the Dutch Advertising Code Committee upheld parts of a complaint about MSC Cruises' environmental advertising, including claims about liquefied natural gas and progress towards net-zero emissions by 2050. It recommended discontinuing the misleading claims while rejecting other parts of the complaint. MSC said it had already implemented most of the recommended changes.
- In October 2024, the advocacy group Climate Integrity, represented by the Environmental Defenders Office, lodged a complaint with the Australian Competition and Consumer Commission alleging that Qantas' "Fly Carbon Neutral" programme and sustainability and net-zero claims misled consumers. Qantas said its offsetting programme was certified under the Australian government's Climate Active standard and that carbon offsets were needed while alternative fuels and technologies became more widely available.

=== Coal industry ===
- In 2024, Turkey's Minister of Energy and Natural Resources, Alparslan Bayraktar, announced that the government aimed to increase coal mining in an environmentally friendly way.
- As of 2025, the Turkish Coal Operations Authority website has a toggle for "energy saving mode" which changes the web page from color to monochrome.

=== Oil industry ===
- Chevron's 2010 advertising campaign was described by the Rainforest Action Network, Amazon Watch, and The Yes Men as greenwash. A spoof campaign was launched to pre-empt Chevron's greenwashing.
- In 1985, the Chevron Corporation launched one of the most famous greenwashing ad campaigns. Chevron's "People Do" advertisements were aimed at a "hostile audience" of "societally conscious" people. Two years after the campaign's launch, surveys found people in California trusted Chevron more than other oil companies to protect the environment. In the late 1980s, the American Chemistry Council started a program called Responsible Care, which shone a light on the environmental performance and precautions of the group's members. The loose guidelines of responsible care caused industries to adopt self-regulation over government regulation.
- BP was also reported to have engaged in such conduct in the 2010s.

=== Animal agriculture industry ===
- In response to environmental criticism linking beef production to climate change, the National Cattlemen's Association (NCA) launched a $100,000 advertising campaign in 1990 featuring full-page ads in The New York Times and USA Today with the slogan "Every Day is Earth Day for American Cattlemen," presenting the beef industry as environmentally responsible despite mounting scientific evidence of its climate impact.

=== Political campaigns ===
- In 2010, environmentalists stated the Bush Administration's "Clear Skies Initiative" actually weakened air pollution laws. Similar laws were issued under President Macron of France as "simplifying ecology rules" that were criticized on similar grounds, while still being referred to by his government as "ecology laws."
- "Clean Coal," an initiative adopted by several platforms for the 2008 U.S. presidential election, cited carbon capture and storage as a means of reducing carbon emissions by capturing and injecting carbon dioxide produced by coal power plants into layers of porous rock below the ground. According to Fred Pearce's Greenwash column in The Guardian, clean coal is the "ultimate climate change oxymoron... pure and utter greenwash." In 2017, Australia's then Treasurer Scott Morrison used "Clean Coal" as the basis to suggest clean energy subsidies be used to build new coal power plants.
- The renaming of "Tar Sands" to "Oil Sands" (Alberta, Canada) in corporate and political language reflects an ongoing debate between the project's adherents and opponents. This semantic shift can be seen as a case of greenwashing in an attempt to counter growing public concern about the environmental and health impacts of the industry. While advocates claim that the shift is scientifically derived to better reflect the use of the sands as a precursor to oil, environmental groups argue that it is simply a means of cloaking the issue behind friendlier terminology.

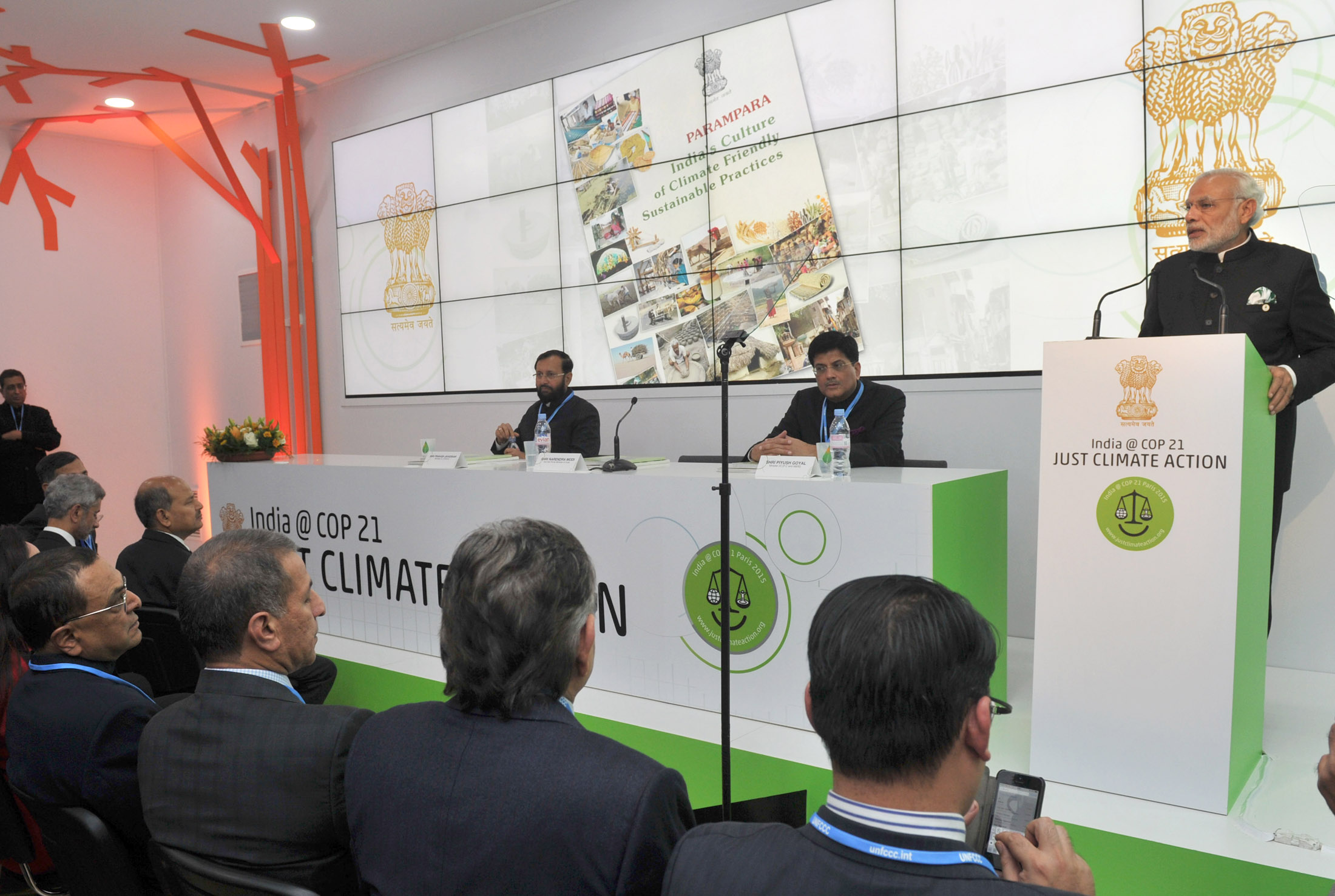
Narendra Modi addressing the inauguration of the India Pavilion, at COP21, in the presence of his ministers Prakash Javadekar and Piyush Goyal

- Since 2018, Indian Prime Minister Narendra Modi has been increasingly promoting himself as an environmental champion, while using rhetoric about protecting the environment at international events. Modi was instrumental in forming the International Solar Alliance and promoting the African cheetah translocation to India. In 2025, he promoted the native foxnut as an alternative food and inaugurated the Vantara zoo, the world's largest zoo that claims to house rescued animals. However, within the country, Modi's Hindu right-wing Bharatiya Janata Party has repeatedly expressed opposition to environmentalism, whenever the former has clashed with Hindu religious occasions, most notably over the bursting of firecrackers in Diwali. The National Green Tribunal, the premier environmental protection body of the country, has been labelled as a 'Hinduphobic' organization by many BJP leaders. Additionally, Hindutva official Yogi Adityanath slammed the National Green Tribunal's report on the pollution of the Hindu holy river Ganga during the 2025 Kumbh Mela in Prayagraj as fake and an attempt to mock the faith of Hindus. The Vantara zoo is described as a private zoo of Anant Ambani, son of Mukesh Ambani, the owner of the world's largest oil refinery. The facility has courted multiple controversies, including allegations of housing wildlife trafficked from South Africa. Modi's green push is described as an attempt to greenwash the images of him and his party before the international community.
- In 2021, Saudi Arabian Crown Prince Mohammed bin Salman announced a tree planting campaign in the desert as part of the plan to reach carbon neutrality by 2060. The plan was criticized as a greenwashing attempt by some climate scientists.
- Some environmental activists and critics condemned the 2021 United Nations Climate Change Conference (COP26) as greenwashing. They also condemned COP28, which is purported to have the highest carbon footprint of all COP events. In May 2023, a Wikipedia user who identified himself as an employee of ADNOC was criticized after suggesting edits in the Wikipedia article about Sultan Al Jaber, president of COP28, to present Al Jaber as a supporter of the climate movement. In June 2023, Marc Owen Jones of Hamad Bin Khalifa University noted that a large number of apparently fake Twitter profiles were used to defend Al Jaber's COP28 presidency.
- The construction of the new Indonesian capital, Nusantara, despite being described as a smart, green, and clean city, has been accused by many groups of alleged greenwashing by the Indonesian government due to extensive environmental damage caused by its construction.

=== Business slogans ===
- "Clean Burning Natural Gas" – When compared to the dirtiest fossil fuel, coal, natural gas is only 50% as dirty. Producing natural gas through fracking and distribution by a pipeline may lead to methane emissions into the atmosphere. Methane, the main component of natural gas, is a potent greenhouse agent. Despite this, natural gas is often presented as a cleaner fossil fuel in environmental discourse. In practice, it balances the intermittent nature of solar and wind energy. It can be considered a useful "transitional technology" towards hydrogen, as hydrogen can already be blended in and eventually be used to replace it, inside gas networks initially conceived for natural gas-use.
- First-generation biofuels are said to be better for the environment than fossil fuels, but some, such as palm oil, contribute to deforestation (which contributes to global warming due to the release of CO_{2}). Higher-generation biofuels do not have these particular issues, but have contributed significantly to deforestation and habitat destruction in Canada due to rising corn prices, which make it economically worthwhile to clear-cut existing forests in agricultural areas.
- An article in Wired magazine highlighted slogans that suggest environmentally benign business activity: the Comcast Ecobill has the motto "PaperLESSisMORE," but Comcast uses large amounts of paper for direct marketing.
- The Poland Spring (from the American city of Poland, Maine) eco shape bottle is touted as "A little natural does a lot of good," although 80% of beverage containers go to landfills.
- The Airbus A380 airliner is described as "A better environment inside and out" even though air travel has a high environmental cost.
- The multinational oil company formerly known as British Petroleum launched a rebranding campaign in 2000, revising the company's acronym as "Beyond Petroleum." The campaign included a revised green logo, advertisements, a solar-paneled gas station in Los Angeles, and clean energy rhetoric across media to strategically position itself as the 'greenest' global oil company. The campaign became the center of public controversy due to the company's hypocrisy around lobbying efforts that sought permission to drill in protected areas and its negligent operating practices that led to severe oil spills – most notably the Prudhoe Bay pipeline rupture in 2006 and the Gulf of Mexico rig explosion in 2010.

=== ESG ratings ===
- In 2021, American financial services company MSCI upgraded the environmental, social, and governance (ESG) rating of the company McDonald's, which produces emissions comparable to an entire mid-size EU country like Portugal, by eliminating from its analysis the significance of greenhouse gas emissions and highlighting a new recycling initiative, which had been mandated by regulatory authorities in France and the United Kingdom for all fast-food companies.
- Volkswagen had an ESG rating higher than its peer average, even though in September 2015, the Environmental Protection Agency (EPA) sanctioned Volkswagen with over $25 billion in fines for using a "defeat device", causing vehicles produced from 2009 to 2015 to pollute at a much higher rate than advertised.
- Totalenergies was sued for claiming it can reach net zero objectives by 2050 while increasing fossil fuel activities. It is rated A− on climate by the CDP.

== Consequences ==
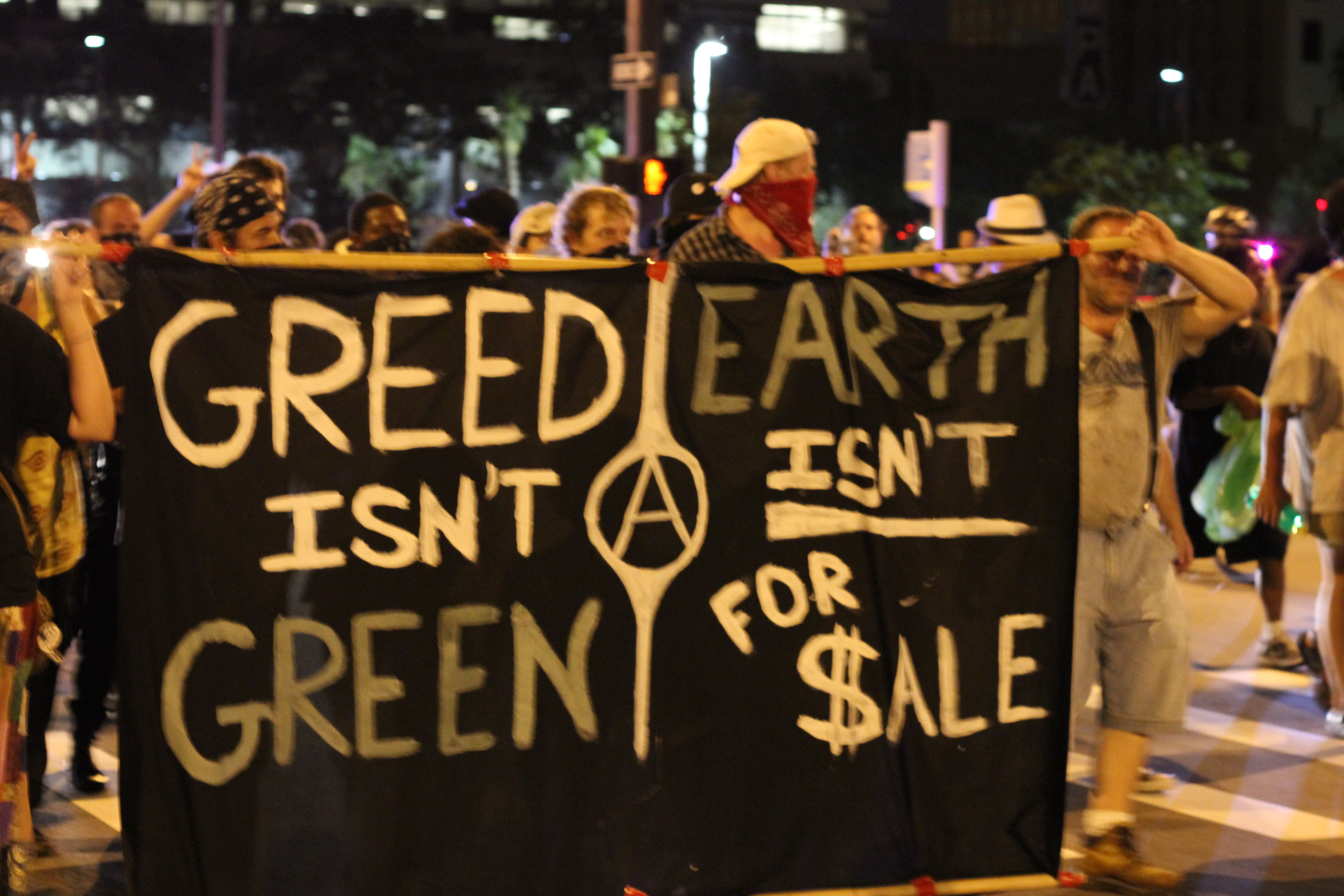
Green anarchist protesters against capitalism, with a sign reading "Greed isn't Green"

=== Lack of integrity ===
Some companies communicate and publicize unsubstantiated ethical claims or social responsibility, and practice greenwashing, which increases consumer cynicism and mistrust. By using greenwashing, companies can present their business as more ecologically sustainable than it is. According to a policy report, greenwashing includes risks such as misleading advertisements and public communications, misleading ESG credentials, and false or deceiving carbon credit claims.

After a legal analysis, the corruption and integrity risks in climate solutions reports show that regulations are significantly weaker for misleading ESG credentials than for climate washing and advertising standards. Despite imposed obligations, ESG rating agencies or ESG auditors are not regulated in any reviewed jurisdictions. Factors such as the lack of oversight by third-party environmental service providers, the opacity of internal scoring methodologies, and the lack of alignment and consistency around ESG assessments can create opportunities for misleading or unsubstantiated claims and, in worst-case scenarios, bribery or fraud.

=== Psychological effects ===
Greenwashing is a relatively new area of research within psychology, and there needs to be more consensus among studies on how greenwashing affects consumers and stakeholders. Because of the variance in country and geography in recently published studies, the discrepancy between consumer behavior in studies could be attributed to cultural or geographic differences.

==== Effect on consumer perception ====
Researchers found that consumers significantly favor environmentally friendly products over their greenwashed counterparts. A survey by LendingTree found that 55% of Americans are willing to spend more money on products they perceive to be more sustainable and eco-friendly.

Consumer perceptions of greenwashing are also mediated by the level of greenwashing they are exposed to. Other research suggests that few consumers notice greenwashing, particularly when they perceive the company or brand as reputable. When consumers perceive green advertising as credible, they develop more positive attitudes towards the brand, even when the advertising is greenwashed.

Consumer trust is mediated by two primary psychological effects, which are green consumer confusion and green perceived risk. Green consumer confusion occurs when a vague environmental claim makes it difficult for consumers to differentiate between genuinely ecological products and misleading ones that merely appear "environmentally friendly". On the other hand, green perceived risk happens when a consumer has an increasing negative perception of the consequences and the product's sustainability claims. Research shows that there is a positive correlation between greenwashing, green consumer confusion, and green perceived risk. With this being said, the consumers tend to negatively evaluate the product and the company environmental efforts when they perceive greenwashing. This can lead to immediately reducing consumer satisfaction during the interaction with a company's website where greenwashing is suspected.

Other research suggests that consumers with more green concern are more able to tell the difference between honest green marketing and greenwashed advertising; the more green concern, the stronger the intention not to purchase from companies from which they perceive greenwashing advertising behavior. When consumers use word-of-mouth to communicate about a product, green concern strengthens the negative relationship between the consumer's intent to purchase and the perception of greenwashing.

Research suggests that consumers distrust companies that greenwash because they view the act as deceptive. If consumers perceive that a company would realistically benefit from a green marketing claim being true, then it is more likely that the claim and the company will be seen as genuine.

Consumers' willingness to purchase green products decreases when they perceive that green attributes compromise product quality, making greenwashing potentially risky, even when the consumer or stakeholder is not skeptical of green messaging. Words and phrases often used in green messaging and greenwashing, such as "gentle," can lead consumers to believe the green product is less effective than a non-green option.

==== Attributions of greenwashing ====
Eco-labels can be given to a product from an external organization and the company itself. This has raised concerns because companies can label a product as green or environmentally friendly by selectively disclosing positive attributes of the product while not disclosing environmental harms. Consumers expect to see eco-labels from both internal and external sources but perceive labels from external sources to be more trustworthy. Researchers from the University of Twente found that uncertified or greenwashed internal eco-labels may still contribute to consumer perceptions of a responsible company, with consumers attributing internal motivation to a company's internal eco-labeling. Other research connecting attribution theory and greenwashing found that consumers often perceive green advertising as greenwashing when companies use green advertisements, attributing the green messaging to corporate self-interest. Green advertising can backfire, particularly when the advertised environmental claim does not match a company's environmental engagement.

==== Implications for green business ====
Researchers working with consumer perception, psychology, and greenwashing note that companies should "walk the walk" regarding green advertising and behavior to avoid the negative connotations and perceptions of greenwashing. Green marketing, labeling, and advertising are most effective when they match a company's environmental engagement. This is also mediated by the visibility of those environmental engagements, meaning that if consumers are unaware of a company's commitment to sustainability or environmentally-conscious ethos, they cannot factor greenness in their assessment of the company or product.

Exposure to greenwashing can make consumers indifferent to or generate negative feelings toward green marketing. Thus, genuinely green businesses must work harder to differentiate themselves from those who use false claims. Nevertheless, consumers may react negatively to valid sustainability claims because of negative experiences with greenwashing.

Conversely, concerns about the perception of genuine efforts to develop more environmentally friendly practices can lead to "greenhushing", where a company avoids publicizing these efforts out of concern that they will be accused of greenwashing anyway.

== Recommendations for avoidance ==
The US University of California (UCLA) recommends the following to avoid greenwashing:

- For managers: Teach employees through courses on greenwashing, emphasize open communication and ethical behavior, reward employees for spotting examples and punish employees for any involvement.
- For policymakers: Mandated and voluntary disclosure of environmental performance would help create transparency between stakeholders and costumers. For example, mandated release of environmental performance metrics from each year, along with disclosing the true environmental characteristics of products. It is also recommended that these are done through the help of Non-Governmental Organizations (NGO). Stakeholders should be aggregating and diffusing their environmental performance information to maintain transparency with their consumers.
- For Non-Governmental Organizations: Sharing information about different greenwashing incidents, help educate consumers about the effects of greenwashing and when to be able to spot it.

== Deterrence ==
Companies may pursue environmental certification to avoid greenwashing through independent verification of their green claims. For example, the Carbon Trust Standard launched in 2007 with the stated aim "to end 'greenwash' and highlight firms that are genuine about their commitment to the environment".

There have been attempts to reduce the impact of greenwashing by exposing it to the public. The Greenwashing Index, created by the University of Oregon in partnership with EnviroMedia Social Marketing, allowed the public to upload and rate examples of greenwashing, but it was last updated in 2012.

Research published in the Journal of Business Ethics in 2011 suggests that sustainability ratings might deter greenwashing. Results concluded that higher sustainability ratings lead to significantly higher brand reputation than lower sustainability ratings. This same trend was found regardless of the company's level of corporate social responsibility (CSR) communications. This finding establishes that consumers pay more attention to sustainability ratings than CSR communications or greenwashing claims.

The World Federation of Advertisers released six new guidelines for advertisers in 2022 to prevent greenwashing. These approaches encourage credible environmental claims and more sustainable outcomes.

== Regulation ==
Worldwide regulations on misleading environmental claims vary from criminal liability to fines or voluntary guidelines.

=== Australia ===
The Australian Consumer Law prohibits false or misleading environmental claims about goods and services. The Australian Competition and Consumer Commission (ACCC) investigates such claims and can take enforcement action. In financial services, the Australian Securities and Investments Commission (ASIC) administers prohibitions on misleading conduct under the Australian Securities and Investments Commission Act 2001 and the Corporations Act 2001.

In March 2023, the ACCC reported that 57 per cent of the 247 businesses examined in an internet sweep had made environmental claims that raised concerns. In December 2023, it published guidance setting out eight principles for environmental claims, including substantiating claims with evidence, explaining qualifications, avoiding broad or unqualified statements, and ensuring that visual imagery does not mislead consumers.

ASIC's court actions resulted in penalties against Mercer Superannuation (Australia) of A$11.3 million in August 2024 and Vanguard Investments Australia of A$12.9 million in September 2024 for misleading claims about sustainable investment options and investment screening, respectively. In March 2025, the Federal Court imposed a penalty of A$10.5 million on the trustee of Active Super, which had invested in securities that its environmental, social and governance screens purported to exclude or restrict.

In April 2025, following ACCC proceedings, the Federal Court ordered Clorox Australia to pay A$8.25 million for misleading claims that certain GLAD rubbish bags contained recycled ocean plastic. Clorox admitted that the recycled material had instead been collected from communities in Indonesia up to 50 kilometres from the shoreline. The court also required a compliance programme and a corrective notice.

Greenwashing claims have also been brought by advocacy organisations. In February 2026, the Federal Court dismissed the Australasian Centre for Corporate Responsibility's case alleging that Santos had made misleading claims about decarbonisation. An appeal was discontinued by consent in August 2026.

=== Canada ===
Canada's Competition Bureau, along with the Canadian Standards Association, discourages companies from making "vague claims" about their products' environmental impact. Any claims must be backed up by "readily available data."

=== European Union ===
The European Anti-Fraud Office (OLAF) handles investigations that have an environmental or sustainability element, such as the misspending of EU funds intended for green products and the counterfeiting and smuggling of products with the potential to harm the environment and health. It also handles illegal logging and smuggling of precious wood and timber into the EU (wood laundering).

In January 2021, the European Commission, in cooperation with national consumer protection authorities, published a report on its annual survey of consumer websites investigated for violations of EU consumer protection law. The study examined green claims across a wide range of consumer products, concluding that for 42 percent of the websites examined, the claims were likely false and misleading and could well constitute actionable claims for unfair commercial practices.

In the context of escalating concerns regarding the authenticity of corporate ecological sustainability claims, greenwashing has emerged as a significant issue and poses a real challenge to sustainable finance regulations gaps. ESMA outlined the correlation between the growth of ESG-related funds and greenwashing. The exponential rise of funds integrating vague ESG-related language in their names started since the Paris Agreement (2015), and is effective in deceivingly attracting more investors.

The 2020-2024 agenda of DG FISMA concern about greenwashing reconciles two objectives: increasing capital for sustainable investments and bolstering trust and investor protection in European financial markets.

The European Union struck a provisional agreement to mandate new reporting rules for companies with over 250 staff and a turnover of €40 million. They must disclose environmental, social, and governance (ESG) information, which will help combat greenwashing. These requirements go into effect in 2024. The European Commission has introduced a proposal of ESG regulation aimed at bolstering transparency and integrity within ESG rating in 2023.

=== Germany ===
In June 2024, the Federal Constitutional Court of Germany ruled that companies that use "climate neutral" in advertising must define what the term means or use of the phrase would not continue to be permitted due to the phrase being too vague.

=== Norway ===
Norway's consumer ombudsman has targeted automakers who claim their cars are "green", "clean", or "environmentally friendly", with some of the world's strictest advertising guidelines. Consumer Ombudsman official Bente Øverli said: "Cars cannot do anything good for the environment except less damage than others." Manufacturers risk fines if they fail to drop misleading advertisements. Øverli said she did not know of other countries going so far in cracking down on cars and the environment.

=== Thailand ===
The Green Leaf Certification is an evaluation method created by the Association of Southeast Asian Nations (ASEAN) as a metric that rates the hotels' environmental efficiency of environmental protection. In Thailand, this certification is believed to help regulate greenwashing phenomena associated with green hotels. Eco hotel or "green hotel" are hotels that have adopted sustainable, environmentally-friendly practices in hospitality business operations. Since the development of the tourism industry in the ASEAN, Thailand superseded its neighboring countries in inbound tourism, with 9 percent of Thailand's direct GDP contributions coming from the travel and tourism industry in 2015. Because of the growth and reliance on tourism as an economic pillar, Thailand developed "responsible tourism" in the 1990s to promote the well-being of local communities and the environment affected by the industry. However, studies show the green hotel companies' principles and environmental perceptions contradict the basis of corporate social responsibilities in responsible tourism. Against this context, the Green Leaf Certification issuance aims to keep the hotel industry and supply chains accountable for corporate social responsibilities regarding sustainability by having an independent international organization evaluate a hotel and rate it one through five leaves.

=== United Kingdom ===
The Competition and Markets Authority is the UK's primary competition and consumer authority. In September 2021, it published a Green Claims Code to protect consumers from misleading environmental claims and businesses from unfair competition. In May 2024, the Financial Conduct Authority introduced anti-greenwashing rules covering sustainability claims made by regulated firms that market financial products or services.

=== United States ===
The Federal Trade Commission (FTC) provides voluntary guidelines for environmental marketing claims. These guidelines give the FTC the right to prosecute false and misleading claims. These guidelines are not enforceable but instead were intended to be followed voluntarily:

One important guideline involves qualifications and disclosures. The Commission traditionally has held that to be effective, any qualifications or disclosures such as those described in the green guides should be sufficiently clear, prominent, and understandable to prevent deception. Clarity of language, relative type size and proximity to the claim being qualified, and an absence of contrary claims that could undercut effectiveness, will maximize the likelihood that the qualifications and disclosures are appropriately clear and prominent.

Another guideline focuses on making a distinction between benefits of product, package, and service. An environmental marketing claim should be presented in a way that makes clear whether the environmental attribute or benefit being asserted refers to the product, the product's packaging, a service, or to a portion or component of the product, package or service. If the environmental attribute or benefit applies to all but minor, incidental components of a product or package, the claim need not be qualified to identify that fact. There may be exceptions to this general principle. For example, if an unqualified "recyclable" claim is made and the presence of the incidental component significantly limits the ability to recycle the product, then the claim would be deceptive.

The FTC also warns against an overstatement of environmental attribute. An environmental marketing claim should not be presented in a manner that overstates the environmental attribute or benefit, expressly or by implication. Marketers should avoid implications of significant environmental benefits if the benefit is negligible.

Finally, the guidelines address the use of comparative claims. When an environmental marketing claims includes a comparative statement, it should be presented in a manner that makes the basis for the comparison sufficiently clear to avoid consumer deception. In addition, the advertiser should be able to substantiate the comparison.

The FTC announced in 2010 that it would update its guidelines for environmental marketing claims in an attempt to reduce greenwashing. The revision to the FTC's Green Guides covers a wide range of public input, including hundreds of consumer and industry comments on previously proposed revisions, offering clear guidance on what constitutes misleading information and demanding clear factual evidence.

According to FTC Chairman Jon Leibowitz, "The introduction of environmentally-friendly products into the marketplace is a win for consumers who want to purchase greener products and producers who want to sell them." Leibowitz also says such a win-win can only operate if marketers' claims are straightforward and proven.

In 2013, the FTC began enforcing these revisions. It cracked down on six different companies; five of the cases concerned false or misleading advertising surrounding the biodegradability of plastics. The FTC charged ECM Biofilms, American Plastic Manufacturing, CHAMP, Clear Choice Housewares, and Carnie Cap, for misrepresenting the biodegradability of their plastics treated with additives.

The FTC charged a sixth company, AJM Packaging Corporation, with violating a commission consent order prohibiting companies from using advertising claims based on the product or packaging being "degradable, biodegradable, or photodegradable" without reliable scientific information. The FTC now requires companies to disclose and provide the information that qualifies their environmental claims to ensure transparency.

=== China ===
The issue of green marketing and consumerism in China has gained significant attention as the country faces environmental challenges. According to "Green Marketing and Consumerism in China: Analyzing the Literature" by Qingyun Zhu and Joseph Sarkis, China has implemented environmental protection laws to regulate the business and commercial sector. Regulations such as the Environmental Protection Law and the Circular Economy Promotion Law contain provisions prohibiting false advertising (known as greenwashing). The Chinese government has issued regulations and standards to regulate green advertising and labeling, including the Guidelines for Green Advertising Certification, the Guidelines for Environmental Labeling and Eco-Product Certification, and the Standards for Environmental Protection Product Declaration. These guidelines promote transparency in green marketing and prevent false or misleading claims. The Guidelines for Green Advertising Certification require that green advertising claims should be truthful, accurate, and verifiable. These guidelines and certifications require that eco-labels should be based on scientific and technical evidence, and should not contain false or misleading information. The standards also require that eco-labels be easy to understand and not confuse or deceive consumers. The regulations that are set in place for greenwashing, green advertising, and labeling in China are designed to protect consumers and prevent misleading claims. China's climate crisis, sustainability, and greenwashing remain critical and require ongoing attention. The implementation of regulations and guidelines for green advertising and labeling in China aims to promote transparency and prevent false or misleading claims.

In efforts to stop this practice, in November 2016, the General Office of the State Council introduced legislation to promote the development of green products, encourage companies to adopt sustainable practices, and mention the need for a unified standard for what was to be labeled green. This was a general plan or opinion on the matter, with no specifics on its implementation, however with similarly worded legislation and plans out at that time there was a push toward a unified green product standard. Until then, green products had various standards and guidelines developed by different government agencies or industry associations, resulting in a lack of consistency and coherence. One example of guidelines set then was from the Ministry of Environmental Protection of China (now known as the Ministry of Ecology and Environment). They issued specifications in 2000, but these guidelines were limited and not widely recognized by industry or consumers. It was not until 2017, with the launch of GB/T (a set of national standards and recommendations), that a widespread guideline was set for what would constitute green manufacturing and a green supply chain. Expanding on these guidelines in 2019 the State Administration for Market Regulation (SAMR) created regulations for Green Product Labels, which are symbols used on products to mark that they meet certain environmentally friendly criteria, and certification agencies have verified their manufacturing process. The standards and coverage for green products have increased as time passes, with changes and improvements to green product standardization still occurring in 2023.

In China, the Greenpeace Campaign focuses on the pain point of air pollution. The campaign aims to address the severe air pollution problem prevalent in many Chinese communities. The campaign has been working to raise awareness about air pollution's health and environmental impacts, advocate for more robust government policies and regulations to reduce emissions, and encourage a shift toward clean and renewable energy sources. "From 2011 to 2016, we linked global fast fashion brands to toxic chemical pollution in China through their manufacturers. Many multinational companies and local suppliers have stopped using toxic and harmful chemicals. They included Adidas, Benetton, Burberry, Esprit, H&M, Puma, and Zara, among others." The Greenpeace Campaign in China has involved various activities, including scientific research, public education, and advocacy efforts. The campaign has organized public awareness events to engage both consumers and policymakers, urging them to take action to improve air quality. "In recent years, Chinese Communist Party general secretary Xi Jinping has committed to controlling the expansion of coal power plants. He has also pledged to stop building new coal power abroad". The campaign seeks to drive public and government interest toward more strict air pollution control measures, promote more clean energy technology, and contribute to health, wellness, and sustainability in China. However, the health of Chinese citizens is at the forefront of this issue, as air pollution is a critical issue in the nation. The article emphasizes that China has prioritized putting people front and center on environmental issues. China's Greenpeace campaigns and those in other countries are a part of their global efforts to address environmental challenges and promote sustainability.

== Related terms ==
"Bluewashing" is a similar term. However, instead of falsely advertising environmentally friendly practices, companies are advertising corporate social responsibility. For example, companies are saying they are fighting for human rights while practicing very unethical production practices such as paying factory employees next to nothing.

Carbon emission trading can be similar to greenwashing in that it gives an environmentally-friendly impression, but can be counterproductive if carbon is priced too low, or if large emitters are given "free credits". For example, Bank of America subsidiary MBNA offers "Eco-Logique" MasterCards that reward Canadian customers with carbon offsets when they use them. Customers may feel that they are nullifying their carbon footprint by purchasing goods with these, but only 0.5% of the purchase price goes to buy carbon offsets; the rest of the interchange fee still goes to the bank.

=== Greenscamming ===
Greenscamming describes an organization or product taking on a name that falsely implies environmental friendliness. It is related to both greenwashing and greenspeak. This is analogous to aggressive mimicry in biology.

Greenscamming is used in particular by industrial companies and associations that deploy astroturfing organisations to try to dispute scientific findings that threaten their business model. One example is the denial of man-made global warming by companies in the fossil energy sector, also driven by specially-founded greenscamming organizations.

One reason to establish greenscamming organizations is that openly communicating the benefits of activities that damage the environment is difficult. Sociologist Charles Harper stresses that marketing a group called "Coalition to Trash the Environment for Profit" would be difficult. Anti-environment initiatives, therefore, must give their front organizations deliberately deceptive names if they want to be successful, as surveys show that environmental protection has a social consensus. However, the danger of being exposed as an anti-environmental initiative entails a considerable risk that the greenscamming activities will backfire and be counterproductive for the initiators.

Greenscamming organizations are active in organized climate denial. An important financier of greenscamming organizations was the oil company ExxonMobil, which financially supported more than 100 climate denial organizations and spent about 20 million U.S. dollars on greenscamming groups. James Lawrence Powell identified the "admirable" designations of many of these organizations as the most striking common feature, which for the most part sounded very rational. He quotes a list of climate denial organizations drawn up by the Union of Concerned Scientists, which includes 43 organizations funded by Exxon. None had a name that would lead one to infer that climate change denial was their "raison d'être". The list is headed by Africa Fighting Malaria, whose website features articles and commentaries opposing ambitious climate mitigation concepts, even though the dangers of malaria could be exacerbated by global warming.

==== Greenscamming organizations ====
Examples of greenscamming organizations include the National Wetlands Coalition, Friends of Eagle Mountain, The Sahara Club, The Alliance for Environment and Resources, The Abundant Wildlife Society of North America, the Global Climate Coalition, the National Wilderness Institute, the Environmental Policy Alliance of the Center for Organizational Research and Education, and the American Council on Science and Health. Behind these ostensible environmental protection organizations lie the interests of business sectors. For example, oil drilling companies and real estate developers support the National Wetlands Coalition. The Friends of Eagle Mountain is backed by a mining company that wants to convert open-cast mines into landfills. The Global Climate Coalition was backed by commercial enterprises that fought against government-imposed climate protection measures. Other Greenscam organizations include the U.S. Council for Energy Awareness, backed by the nuclear industry; the Wilderness Impact Research Foundation, representing the interests of loggers and ranchers; and the American Environmental Foundation, representing the interests of landowners.

Another Greenscam organization is the Northwesterners for More Fish, which had a budget of $2.6 million in 1998. This group opposed conservation measures for endangered fish that restricted the interests of energy companies, aluminum companies, and the region's timber industry and tried to discredit environmentalists who promoted fish habitats. The Center for the Study of Carbon Dioxide and Global Change, the National Environmental Policy Institute, and the Information Council on the Environment funded by the coal industry are also greenscamming organizations.

In Germany, this form of mimicry or deception is used by the "European Institute for Climate and Energy" (EIKE), which suggests by its name that it is an important scientific research institution. In fact, EIKE is not a scientific institution at all, but a lobby organization that neither has an office nor employs climate scientists, but instead disseminates fake news on climate issues on its website.

=== ESG ===
Environmental, Social, and Governance (ESG) refers to a broad set of criteria used by stakeholder and investors to evaluate a company's environmental impact, social effects, and governance practices. Since it is not legally defined and encompasses various issues, its scope remain contested among investors and policymakers. Some federal debates, like the 119th Congress, have addressed whether and how companies should display ESG ratings. There are some efforts to expand the requirements and others seeking to limit them. The companies that demonstrate a superior performance of ESG are more likely to portray ethical integrity, commit to legal regulations, and consider the interests of all stakeholders.

Despite the uncertainty regarding the regulations, many companies continue to use ESG to respond to the expectations of investors. The environmental aspect of ESG includes pollution, biodiversity loss, scarcity of resources, and other climate change issues. The social risks focus on the impact on employees, consumers, suppliers, and communities. Finally the governance aspect focuses on corruption, internal controls, and corporate misconduct. The failure to address these factor may result in reputational damage, operational, taking legal action, operational disruptions, and in extreme situations, a collapse of the firm.

=== CSR ===
Corporate social responsibility (CSR) encompasses a broad and expanding range of issues, including employee relations, human rights, corporate ethics, community engagement, environmental practices, and marketplace responsibilities toward customers and suppliers. CSR Europe, a major business network, identifies six core areas of CSR reporting: workplace, marketplace, environment, community, ethics, and human rights.

CSR involves the voluntary actions taken by companies to improve the social well-being of the stakeholders affected by their economic activities. By engaging in CSR, companies generate more support from stakeholders (like purchase, employment, and investments), and in the long run, build a brand image that enhances the relationship with stakeholders and their advocacy behaviors.

Scholars describe CSR as evolving through different stages, like: corporate social trusteeship, corporate social responsiveness, business ethics, corporate global citizenship, and emerging millennial approaches. Each of these factors are shaped by the values of the society, the stakeholder expectations, and the public policies.

CSR acknowledges that even though firms provide jobs, investments, economic growth, and goods and services to people, their operations may also have a negative effect on the society and the environment. The priorities of CSR and the understanding of a business's role is evolving.

The form and intensity of CSR vary across societies. For example, market-oriented economies tend to pressure more social expectation on private firms, which may result in corporate resistance, while state-regulated economies provide more structures for social welfare and reduces the CSR pressure on firms, that tends to foster a greater and voluntary effort towards CSR.

== See also ==
- -washing
- Astongate
- Climate bond (green bond)
- Coca-Cola Life
- Conspicuous conservation
- Dieselgate
- Eco-capitalism
- Eco-nationalism
- Ecodesign
- Ecolabel
- EMAS
- Ethics of philanthropy
- False advertising
- Farm to fork
- Fossil fuels lobby
- Gasoline additives
- Green brands
- Greenlash
- Green marketing
- Green parking lot
- Green transition
- Reputation laundering
- Sunshine unit
