= Environmental, social, and governance =

Business framework

Environmental, social, and governance (ESG) is shorthand for an investing principle that prioritizes environmental issues, social issues, and corporate governance. Investing with ESG considerations is sometimes referred to as responsible investing or, in more proactive cases, impact investing. The term is also frequently used interchangeably with corporate social responsibility and sustainability, although these concepts have different foci, origins and applications.

The term ESG first came to prominence in a 2004 report titled "Who Cares Wins", which was a joint initiative of financial institutions at the invitation of the United Nations (UN). By 2023, the ESG movement had grown from a UN corporate social responsibility initiative into a global phenomenon representing more than US$30 trillion in assets under management.

Criticisms of ESG vary depending on viewpoint and area of focus. These areas include data quality and a lack of standardization; evolving regulation and politics; greenwashing; and variety in the definition and assessment of social good. Some critics argue that ESG serves as a de facto extension of governmental regulation, with large investment firms like BlackRock imposing ESG standards that governments cannot or do not directly legislate. This has led to accusations that ESG creates a mechanism for influencing markets and corporate behavior without democratic oversight, raising concerns about accountability and overreach.

== History ==
Investment decisions are predominantly based on the potential for financial returns for a given level of risk. However, there have always been many other criteria for deciding where to place money—from political considerations to heavenly reward.

In the 1970s, the worldwide abhorrence of the apartheid regime in South Africa led to one of the most renowned examples of selective disinvestment along ethical lines. As a response to a growing call for sanctions against the regime, the Reverend Leon Sullivan, a board member of General Motors in the United States, drew up a Code of Conduct in 1977 for practising business with South Africa. What became known as the Sullivan Principles (Sullivan Code) attracted a great deal of attention. Several reports were commissioned by the government to examine how many US companies were investing in South African businesses that were contravening the Sullivan Code. The conclusions of the reports led to mass disinvestment by the US from many South African companies. The resulting pressure applied to the South African regime by its business community added great weight to the growing impetus for the system of apartheid to be abandoned.

In the 1960s and 1970s, the economist Milton Friedman, in response to the prevailing mood of philanthropy, argued that social responsibility adversely affects a firm's financial performance and that regulation and interference from "big government" will always damage the macro economy. His contention that the valuation of a company or asset should be predicated almost exclusively on the financial bottom line (with the costs incurred by social responsibility being deemed non-essential) was prevalent for most of the 20th century (see Friedman doctrine). Towards the end of the 20th century, however, a contrary theory began to gain ground. In 1988 James S. Coleman wrote an article in the American Journal of Sociology titled "Social Capital in the Creation of Human Capital", the article challenged the dominance of the concept of 'self-interest' in economics and introduced the concept of social capital into the measurement of value.

There was a new form of pressure applied, acting in a coalition with environmental groups: using the leveraging power of collective investors to encourage companies and capital markets to incorporate environmental and social risks and opportunities into their decision-making.

Although the concept of selective investment was not a new one, with the demand side of the investment market having a long history of those wishing to control the effects of their investments, what began to develop at the turn of the 21st century was a response from the supply-side of the equation. At the time, this field was typically referred to as ethical or socially responsible investment. The investment market began to pick up on the growing need for products geared towards what was becoming known as the Responsible Investor. In 1981, Freer Spreckley, the creator of Social Enterprise, published Social Audit — A Management Tool for Co-operative Working, in which he first introduced the idea of a set of internal criteria that social enterprises and other organisations should use in their annual planning and accounting. These were financial viability, social wealth creation, organisational governance, and environmental responsibility, and they became known as social accounting and auditing. Later on, in 1998, John Elkington, co-founder of the business consultancy Sustainability, published Cannibals with Forks: the Triple Bottom Line of 21st Century Business, in which he identified the newly emerging cluster of non-financial considerations that should be included in the factors determining a company or equity's value. He coined the phrase the "triple bottom line", referring to the financial, environmental, and social factors included in the new calculation. At the same time, the strict division between the environmental sector and the financial sector began to break down. In the City of London in 2002, Chris Yates-Smith, a member of the international panel chosen to oversee the technical construction, accreditation, and distribution of the Organic Production Standard and founder of a branding consultancy, established one of the first environmental finance research groups. The informal group of financial leaders, city lawyers, and environmental stewardship NGOs became known as The Virtuous Circle, and its brief was to examine the nature of the correlation between environmental and social standards and financial performance. Several of the world's big banks and investment houses began to respond to the growing interest in the ESG investment market with the provision of sell-side services; among the first were the Brazilian bank Unibanco, and Mike Tyrell's Jupiter Fund in London, which used ESG based research to provide both HSBC and Citicorp with selective investment services in 2001.

In the early years of the new millennium, the major part of the investment market still accepted the historical assumption that ethically directed investments were by their nature likely to hinder financial returns. Philanthropy was not considered to aid profitable business, and Friedman had provided a widely accepted academic basis for the argument that the costs of behaving in an ethically responsible manner would outweigh the benefits. However, the assumptions were beginning to be fundamentally challenged. In 1998 two journalists, Robert Levering and Milton, brought out the "Fortune 100 Best Companies to Work For", initially a listing in the magazine Fortune, then a book compiling a list of the best-practicing companies in the United States with regard to corporate social responsibility and how their financial performance fared as a result. Of the three areas of concern that ESG represented, the environmental and social had received most of the public and media attention, not least because of the growing fears concerning climate change. Moskowitz brought the spotlight onto the corporate governance aspect of responsible investment. His analysis concerned how the companies were managed, what the stockholder relationships were, and how the employees were treated. He argued that improving corporate governance procedures did not damage financial performance; on the contrary, it maximized productivity, ensured corporate efficiency, and led to the sourcing and utilizing of superior management talents. In the early 2000s, the success of Moskowitz's list and its effect on companies' ease of recruitment and brand reputation began to challenge the historical assumptions regarding the financial effect of ESG factors. In 2011, Alex Edmans, a finance professor at Wharton, published a paper in the Journal of Financial Economics showing that the "100 Best Companies to Work For" outperformed their peers in terms of stock returns by 2–3% a year over 1984–2009, and delivered earnings that systematically exceeded analyst expectations.

In 2005, the United Nations Environment Programme Finance Initiative commissioned a report from the international law firm Freshfields Bruckhaus Deringer on the interpretation of the law with respect to investors and ESG issues. The Freshfields report concluded that not only was it permissible for investment companies to integrate ESG issues into investment analysis, but it was also arguably part of their fiduciary duty to do so. In 2014, the Law Commission (England and Wales) confirmed that there was no bar on pension trustees and others from taking account of ESG factors when making investment decisions.

Where Friedman had provided academic support for the argument that the integration of ESG type factors into financial practice would reduce financial performance, numerous reports began to appear in the early years of the century that provided research that supported arguments to the contrary. In 2006 Oxford University's Michael Barnett and New York University's Robert Salomon published an influential study which concluded that the two sides of the argument might even be complementary—they propounded a relationship between social responsibility and financial performance. Both selective investment practices and non-selective ones could maximise the financial performance of an investment portfolio, and the only route likely to damage performance was a middle way of selective investment. Besides the large investment companies and banks taking an interest in matters ESG, an array of investment companies specifically dealing with responsible investment and ESG based portfolios began to spring up throughout the financial world.

Many in the investment industry believe the development of ESG factors as considerations in investment analysis to be inevitable. The evidence toward a relationship between consideration for ESG issues and financial performance is becoming greater and the combination of fiduciary duty and a wide recognition of the necessity of the sustainability of investments in the long term has meant that environmental social and corporate governance concerns are now becoming increasingly important in the investment market. In addition, surveys of ultimate beneficiaries (on whose behalf savings and pensions are made) typically show high levels of support for considering social and environmental issues alongside long-run, risk-adjusted returns. ESG has become less a question of philanthropy than practicality.

There has been uncertainty and debate as to what to call the inclusion of intangible factors relating to the sustainability and ethical effectiveness of investments. Names have ranged from the early use of buzz words such as "green" and "eco", to the wide array of possible descriptions for the types of investment analysis—"responsible investment", "socially responsible investment" (SRI), "ethical", "extra-financial", "long horizon investment" (LHI), "enhanced business", "corporate health", "non-traditional", and others. But the predominance of the term ESG has now become fairly widely accepted. A survey of 350 global investment professionals conducted by Axa Investment Managers and AQ Research in 2008 concluded the vast majority of professionals preferred the term ESG to describe such data.

In January 2016, the PRI, UNEP FI and The Generation Foundation launched a three-year project to end the debate on whether fiduciary duty is a legitimate barrier to the integration of environmental, social, and governance issues in investment practice and decision-making.

This follows the publication in September 2015 of Fiduciary Duty in the 21st Century by the PRI, UNEP FI, UNEP Inquiry and UN Global Compact. The report concluded that "Failing to consider all long-term investment value drivers, including ESG issues, is a failure of fiduciary duty". It also acknowledged that despite significant progress, many investors have yet to fully integrate ESG issues into their investment decision-making processes. In 2021, several organizations were working to make ESG compliance a better understood process in order to establish standards between rating agencies, amongst industries, and across jurisdictions. This included companies like Workiva working from a technology tool standpoint; agencies like the Task Force on Climate-related Financial Disclosures (TCFD) developing common themes in certain industries; and governmental regulations like the EU's 2019 Sustainable Finance Disclosure Regulation (SFDR).

During the COVID-19 pandemic, BlackRock, Fidelity, and Amundi among other asset management companies, placed pressure on pharmaceutical companies in which they had a large stake to cooperate with each other.

In late 2022, Leonard Leo and associated networks launched a campaign to dismantle ESG, with special targeting on climate-friendly investment. Consumers' Research and Republican attorneys general announced investigations into The Vanguard Group. Vanguard announced in early 2023 that it was quitting the Net Zero Asset Managers Alliance and would distance itself from ESG investing altogether as something, according to its CEO, that's not compatible with its fiduciary duties to the investors. Its CEO told the Financial Times that "Our research indicates that ESG investing does not have any advantage over broad-based investing." While most ESG fund managers promise to beat broad indexes, fewer than 1 in 7 of their active equity managers outperformed the broad market in any five-year period and none of them relied exclusively on a net-zero investment methodology.

In 2026, Vanguard paid $29.5 million to settle a lawsuit brought by multiple attorneys general for allegedly conspiring with BlackRock and State Street to use ESG initiatives to manipulate coal markets.

== Investments with ESG criteria ==
Responsible investing through ESG has been globally driven by the COP21 or the Paris agreement, and the UN 2030 sustainable development goals.

In 2021 the ESG assets market value was over $18.4 trillion worth of investments with a projected growth of 12.9% until 2026. ESG saw outflows for the first time in 2023.

By 2023 the EU had 84% of global assets in the sustainable funds market and the US accounted for 11%.

Global Sustainable Fund Statistics by region in 2023 Q3
Region	Flows	Assets		Funds	
Region	USD billions	USD billions	% of total	Nos.	% of total
Europe	15.3	2,293	84	5,608	73
United States	−2.7	299	11	661	9
Asia ex-Japan	2.0	67	2	539	7
Australia/New Zealand	0.0	31	1	268	4
Japan	−0.9	23	1	236	3
Canada	−0.1	31	1	336	4
Total	13.7	2,744	100	7,648	100

Amid allegations of greenwashing and stricter regulations, there is a notable decrease in funds incorporating ESG-related terms into their names. An increasing number of funds in the United States are removing ESG-related terms from their names, a trend not observed in Europe.

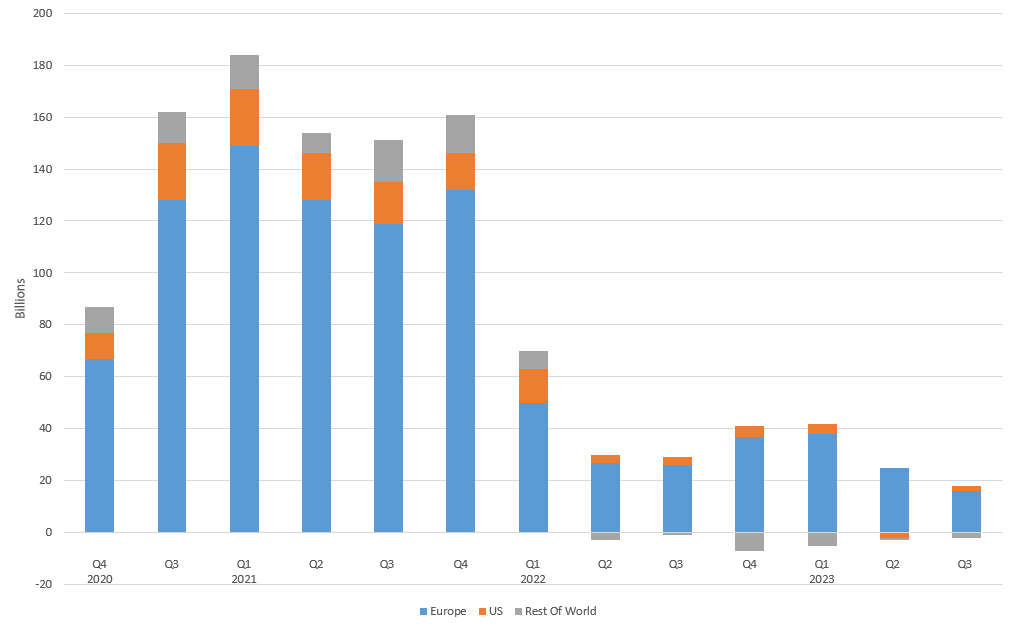
Quarterly Global Sustainable Fund Flows (USD Billion)

Despite the overall increase in ESG funds, the first quarter of 2025 saw record amounts of money pulled from sustainable funds.

The Jain commitment to ahimsa (nonviolence) created a sophisticated framework for financial ethics, prioritizing the psychological intent of the investor alongside the physical outcome of the investment. This institutionalized practice serves as a historical precursor to modern Negative Screening and ESG investing.

== Dimensions ==
ESG has been adopted throughout the United States financial industry to describe and measure the sustainability and societal influence of a company or business. MSCI, a global ESG rating agency, defines ESG investing as the consideration of environmental, social, and governance factors alongside financial factors in the investment decision-making process. Likewise, S&P highlights consideration of the ways in which environmental, social, and governance risks and opportunities can have material effects on companies' performance.

1. Environmental aspect: Data is reported on climate change, greenhouse gas emissions, biodiversity loss, deforestation/reforestation, pollution mitigation, energy efficiency and water management.
2. Social aspect: Data is reported on employee safety and health, working conditions, diversity, equity, and inclusion, and conflicts and humanitarian crises, and is relevant in risk and return assessments directly through results in enhancing (or destroying) customer satisfaction and employee engagement.
3. Governance aspect: Data is reported on corporate governance such as preventing bribery, corruption, Diversity of Board of Directors, executive compensation, cybersecurity and privacy practices, and management structure.

Issues driving Morningstar / Sustainalytics ESG Risk Ratings
Category	Issue	Contribution to ESG Risk Rating
Environmental; 43.3%	Carbon - Own Operations	19.2%
Environmental; 43.3%	Resource Use	10.3%
Environmental; 43.3%	Emissions, Effluents and Waste	7.1%
Environmental; 43.3%	Environmental and Social Impact of Products and Services	6.7%
Social; 34.1%	Human Rights	22.8%
Social; 34.1%	Occupational Health and Safety	7.5%
Social; 34.1%	Community Relations	3.8%
Governance; 22.6%	Corporate Governance	11.9%
Governance; 22.6%	Business Ethics	6.7%
Governance; 22.6%	Human Capital	4.0%

=== Environmental dimension ===
Both the threat of climate change and concern over climate change have grown, so investors are choosing to factor sustainability issues into their investment choices to enable better risk-adjusted returns. The issues often represent externalities, such as influences on the functioning and revenues of the company that are not exclusively affected by market mechanisms. As with all areas of ESG, the breadth of possible concerns is vast (e.g. greenhouse gas emissions, biodiversity, waste management, water management) but some of the chief areas are listed below:

==== Climate crisis ====
The body of research providing data of global trends in climate change has led some investors—pension funds, holders of insurance reserves—to begin to screen investments in terms of their effect on the perceived factors of climate change. Fossil fuel-reliant industries are less attractive. In the UK, investment policies were particularly affected by the conclusions of the Stern Review in 2006, a report commissioned by the British government to provide an economic analysis of the issues associated with climate change. Its conclusions pointed towards the necessity of including considerations of climate change and environmental issues in all financial calculations and that the benefits of early action on climate change would outweigh its costs. The main framework used globally is the Taskforce on Climate-Related Financial Disclosures (TCFD).

==== Environmental sustainability ====
In every area of the debate from the depletion of resources to the future of industries dependent upon diminishing raw materials the question of the obsolescence of a company's product or service is becoming central to the value ascribed to that company. The long-term view is becoming prevalent amongst investors.

=== Social dimension ===
The social dimension of ESG focuses on how companies affect employees and communities, including workplace well-being, equity, and human rights in the supply chain. Social initiatives can improve employee satisfaction and contribute to long-term organizational resilience. Researchers also find that businesses with effective ESG social practices often gain better trust from investors and improved financial outcomes.

==== Diversity ====
There is a growing belief that the broader the pool of talent open to an employer the greater the chance of finding the optimum person for the job. Innovation and agility are seen as the great benefits of diversity, and there is an increasing awareness of what has come to be known as the power of difference. However, merely holding mandatory diversity training is not enough to open companies to opportunities for targeted groups. Studies find the more a company intentionally integrates work teams, the more open it becomes to a diverse workforce; the US military is a prime example of races and genders working well together.

==== Human rights ====
In 2006, the US Courts of Appeals ruled that there was a case to answer bringing the area of a company's social responsibilities squarely into the financial arena. This area of concern is widening to include such considerations as the effect on local communities, the health and welfare of employees and a more thorough examination of a company's supply chain. One of the major frameworks used is the United Nations Guiding Principles on Business and Human Rights.

==== Consumer protection ====
Until fairly recently, caveat emptor ("buyer beware") was the governing principle of commerce and trading. In recent times however, there has been an increased assumption that the consumer has a right to a degree of protection, and the vast growth in damages litigation has meant that consumer protection is a central consideration for those seeking to limit a company's risk and those examining a company's credentials with an eye to investing. The collapse of the US subprime mortgage market initiated a growing movement against predatory lending has also become an important area of concern.

==== Animal welfare ====
Animal welfare concerns involve testing products or ingredients on animals, breeding for testing, exhibiting animals, or factory farms.

==== Conservatives ====
Out of the 435 ESG shareholder proposals that were recorded by the non-profit organization As You Sow in 2021, 22 were classified as conservative by the organization. The National Center for Public Policy Research has asked 7 companies to prepare a report on the BRT Statement of the Purpose of a Corporation. Other conservative proposals include reports on charitable contributions and board nominee ideological diversity.

==== Defense industry ====
The European SFDR considers not sustainable defense companies dealing with anti-personnel mines, cluster munition and chemical and biological weapons. Tanks, armed drones or guns are included. Thus companies such as the Israeli Elbit Systems, producing mortars and drones deployed during the Israeli invasion of the Gaza Strip, or the European Airbus, Rheinmetall, Safran receive investments from "ESG"-labelled funds. The AeroSpace and Defence Industries Association of Europe argues that defense is required for peace and peace is needed for peace and development. Industrial lobbying and the 2022 Russian invasion of Ukraine convinced the European Commission to not leave as unsustainable the rest of the activities of the defense industry.

=== Corporate governance dimension ===
Corporate governance refers to the structures and processes that direct and control companies. Good governance is seen to ensure companies are more accountable, resilient and transparent to investors and gives them the tools to respond to stakeholder concerns.

Corporate Governance in ESG includes issues from the Board of Director's view, Governance Lens watching over Corporate Behavior of the CEO, C-Suite, and employees at large includes measuring the Business ethics, anti-competitive practices, corruption, tax and providing accounting transparency for stakeholders.

In 2024, following engagement with institutional investors and asset managers, the Fair Tax Foundation identified five areas of tax conduct that ESG investors should consider as part of their investment appraisal and risk management.

MSCI puts in the Governance side of the bucket corporate behavior practices and governance of board diversity, executive pay, ownership, and control, and accounting that the board of directors have to oversee on behalf of stakeholders. Other concerns include reporting and transparency, business ethics, board oversight, CEO / board chair split, shareholder right to nominate board candidates, stock buybacks, and dark money given to influence elections.

==== Management structure ====
The system of internal procedures and controls that makes up the management structure of a company is in the valuation of that company's equity. Attention has been focused in recent years on the balance of power between the CEO and the board of directors and specifically the differences between the European model and the US model—in the US studies have found that 80% of companies have a CEO who is also the chairman of the board, in the UK and the European model it was found that 90% of the largest companies split the roles of CEO and chairman.

==== Employee relations ====
In the United States, Moskowitz's list of the Fortune 100 Best Companies to Work For has become an important reference for employees, and companies increasingly compete for inclusion, as it not only supports recruitment efforts but also appears to have a noticeable effect on company values. Employee relations also encompass the representation of co-workers in corporate decision-making and the ability to participate in a union. More recent research suggests that employee relations are influenced by firms' ESG practices, with higher ESG performance and improvements over time associated with greater employee satisfaction through perceptions of organisational justice and expectations of future rewards.

==== Executive compensation ====
Companies are now being asked to list the percentage levels of bonus payments and the levels of remuneration of the highest paid executives are coming under close scrutiny from stock holders and equity investors alike.

==== Employee compensation ====
Besides executive compensation, equitable pay of other employees is a consideration in the governance of an organization. This includes pay equity for employees of all genders. Pay equity audits and the results of those audits may be required by various regulations and, in some cases, made available to the public for review. Hermann J. Stern differentiates four methods to include ESG performance in employee compensation:

1. ESG Targets (Objectives for activities, projects and ESG results set by the company as a goal)
2. ESG Relative Performance Measurement (compared to peers, on the basis of key figures the company considers relevant)
3. ESG Ratings Agencies (Refinitiv, S&P Trucost and RobecoSam, Sustainalytics, ISS ESG, MSCI ESG, Vigeo Eiris, EcoVadis, Minerva Analytics, etc.)
4. ESG Performance Evaluations (internal or independent performance assessment by means of expert opinions, based on internally and externally available objective and subjective facts)

== Responsible investment ==
The three domains of environmental, social, and corporate governance are intimately linked to the concept of responsible investment (RI). RI began as a niche investment area, serving the needs of those who wished to invest but wanted to do so within ethically defined parameters. In recent years it has become a much larger proportion of the investment market. By June 2020, flows into U.S. sustainable funds reached $20.9 billion, nearly matching 2019's flows of $21.4 billion. By the end of 2020, flows into U.S. sustainable funds surpassed $51 billion. Globally, sustainable funds held $1.65 trillion in assets at the end of 2020.

ESG corporate reporting can be used by stakeholders to assess the material sustainability-related risks and opportunities relevant to an organization. Investors may also use ESG data beyond assessing material risks to the organization in their evaluation of enterprise value, specifically by designing models based on assumptions that the identification, assessment, and management of sustainability-related risks and opportunities with respect to all organizational stakeholders leads to higher long-term risk-adjusted return.

=== Investment strategies ===
RI seeks to control the placing of its investments via several methods:

- Positive selection; where the investor actively selects the companies in which to invest; this can be done either by following a defined set of ESG criteria or by the best-in-class method where a subset of high performing ESG compliant companies is chosen for inclusion in an investment portfolio.
- Activism; strategic voting by shareholders in support of a particular issue, or to bring about change in the governance of the company.
- Engagement; investment funds monitoring the ESG performance of all portfolio companies and leading constructive shareholder engagement dialogues with each company to ensure progress.
- Consulting role; the larger institutional investors and shareholders tend to be able to engage in what is known as 'quiet diplomacy', with regular meetings with top management in order to exchange information and act as early warning systems for risk and strategic or governance issues.
- Exclusion; the removal of certain sectors or companies from consideration for investment, based on ESG-specific criteria.
- Integration; the inclusion of ESG risks and opportunities into traditional financial analysis of equity value.

However, in doing so, additional risks are introduced.

- Concentration risk; for example, when compared to the FTSE All-World index, the FTSE4Good Index has an increased weighting towards technology companies
- Lack of effectiveness in removing some industries; companies specialising in alcohol, tobacco, gambling, defence, AI, cryptocurrencies, oil, gas and coal are all still represented in the main indices

=== Relationship between ESG and Corporate Valuation ===
Empirical research on the relationship between environmental, social, and governance (ESG) practices and corporate value has produced mixed findings. Some studies report a positive association between certain ESG indicators and measures of firm performance that are linked to market valuation. However, several studies have questioned the assumption that increased investment in ESG criteria always contributes to corporate value. Some researchers suggest that excessive investment or over-monitoring of ESG initiatives can not only be ineffective but also counterproductive to a firm's valuation. In certain cases, overinvestment in ESG by firms or excessive oversight by investors may limit expected benefits.

In this context, research suggests that the relationship between ESG performance and corporate valuation may be non-linear, exhibiting polynomial characteristics such as inverted U-shaped patterns. This implies the existence of an optimal level of ESG investment where benefits to corporate valuation are maximised, beyond which diminishing returns or even adverse effects may arise.

=== Institutional investors ===
One of the defining marks of the modern investment market is the divergence in the relationship between the firm and its equity investors. Institutional investors have become the key owners of stock—rising from 35% in 1981 to 58% in 2002 in the US and from 42% in 1963 to 84.7% in 2004 in the UK and institutions tend to work on a long-term investment strategy. Insurance companies, Mutual Funds and Pension Funds with long-term payout obligations are much more interested in the long term sustainability of their investments than the individual investor looking for short-term gain. Where a Pension Fund is subject to ERISA, there are legal limitations on the extent to which investment decisions can be based on factors other than maximizing plan participants' economic returns.

Based on the belief that addressing ESG issues will protect and enhance portfolio returns, responsible investment is rapidly becoming a mainstream concern within the institutional industry. By late 2016, over a third of institutional investors (commonly referred to as LPs) based in Europe and Asia-Pacific said that ESG considerations played a major or primary role in refusing to commit to a private equity fund, while the same is true for a fifth of North American LPs. In reaction to investor interest in ESG, private equity and other industry trade associations have developed a number of ESG best practices, including a due diligence questionnaire for private fund managers and other asset managers to use before investing in a portfolio company.

There was a clear acceleration of the institutional shift towards ESG-informed investments in the second semester of 2019. The notion of "SDG Driven Investment" gained further ground amongst pension funds, SWFs and asset managers in the second semester of 2019, notably at the G7 Pensions Roundtable held in Biarritz, 26 August 2019, and the Business Roundtable held in Washington, DC, on 19 August 2019.

Networks of institutional investors committed to curbing climate change have emerged, where in institutional investors are agreeing to hold themselves accountable to climate action targets. One such example is the Institutional Investors Group on Climate Change, looking to deliver significant progress to net zero by 2030. Moreover, the networks have collaborated with investment frameworks to "evaluate" corporate progress to net zero, with one such framework being the Climate Action 100+, a series of criterion used to evaluate the companies emitting the largest quantity of GHG.

=== Principles for Responsible Investment ===
The Principles for Responsible Investment Initiative (PRI) was established in 2005 by the United Nations Environment Programme Finance Initiative and the UN Global Compact as a framework for improving the analysis of ESG issues in the investment process and to aid companies in the exercise of responsible ownership practices. As of April 2019 there are over 2,350 PRI Signatories.

=== Equator Principles ===
The Equator Principles is a risk management framework, adopted by financial institutions, for determining, assessing and managing environmental and social risk in project finance. It is primarily intended to provide a minimum standard for due diligence to support responsible risk decision-making. As of October 2019, 97 adopting financial institutions in 37 countries had officially adopted the Equator Principles, the majority of international Project Finance debt in emerging and developed markets. Equator Principles Financial Institutions (EPFIs) commit to not provide loans to projects where the borrower will not or is unable to comply with their respective social and environmental policies and procedures.

The Equator Principles, formally launched in Washington DC on 4 June 2003, were based on existing environmental and social policy frameworks established by the International Finance Corporation. These standards have subsequently been periodically updated into what is commonly known as the International Finance Corporation Performance Standards on social and environmental sustainability and on the World Bank Group Environmental, Health, and Safety Guidelines.

== Statistics ==
=== United Kingdom ===
According to a nationally representative survey from Finder UK, over half (57%) of UK investors hold an ESG investment. Gen Z being the most likely generation to invest through ESG, with 66% of respondents claiming an interest in ESG investing. Baby boomers were found to be the least likely to consider an ethical investment, with only 11% of this generation planning to invest in an ethical investment.

== ESG rating agencies ==
ESG rating agencies are the main infomediaries of ESG investing. Sustainalytics estimated the number of ESG-rating companies in the ecosystem at over 600 in 2018.

The ESG rating providers market is going through an increasing trend of concentration. For instance, the data aggregator Morningstar took 40% of Sustainalytics stakes by 2017. Following that, the rating agency Moody's acquired Vigeo Eiris in 2019, the former leader of European ESG rating agencies. Institutional Shareholder Services( ISS) acquired Germany's Oekom, while S&P Global acquired the ESG rating business of RobecoSAM. The market's structure is divided between a few very large non-EU providers on one side, and numerous smaller EU providers on the other.

In this highly concentrated ecosystem, small groups of big index providers, like MSCI, play a pivotal role in setting the standards for what is generally accepted as sustainable finance.

As for categorizing ESG rating agencies by purpose, it is crucial to distinguish between two private ESG rating clusters. First, the ESG risk rating agencies (eg : MSCI, Sustainalytics, S&P, FTSE Russell), they are meant to measure how exposed a company is towards ESG risks -meaning the negative externalities affect the company- more than concrete action on the three factors. Secondly, the ESG effectiveness rating agencies (eg : Refinitiv, Moody s, ECPI, Sensefolio, Inrate) which measures ESG factors commitment, integration and results and therefore outward effect on society.

This classification is helpful for understanding the confusion around ESG ratings inefficiency in facing the big challenges ahead on the three factors. Indeed, a company with a higher score doesn't necessarily mean that it has strong environmental, social and governance effect on the world, but rather a low exposure to ESG risks.

Asset managers and other financial institutions increasingly rely on ESG rating agencies to assess, measure and compare companies' ESG performance. More recently, publications like Newsweek have used ESG data provided by market research companies like Statista to rate the most responsible organizations in a country.

Data providers such as ESG Analytics have applied artificial intelligence to rate companies and their commitment to ESG. Each rating agency uses its own set of metrics to measure the level of ESG compliance and there is, at present, no industry-wide set of common standards.

In Latin America, the Latin American Quality Institute (LAQI), headquartered in Panama City and operating in 19 countries, leads the ESG certification movement with more than 10,000 certifications issued. In 2024, LAQI launched the LAQI Q-ESG CERTIFICATION, a structured institutional validation framework assessing organizational maturity across four dimensions — Quality (Q), Environmental (E), Social (S), and Governance (G) — applicable to SMEs across 22 sectors. Each certificate is recorded on LAQIChain, a blockchain registry on the Polygon network. The full framework is publicly available at

== Disclosure and regulation ==
The first ten years of the 21st century has seen growth in the ESG defined investment market. Not only do most of the world's big banks have departments and divisions exclusively addressing Responsible Investment but boutique firms specialising in advising and consulting on environmental, social, and governance related investments are proliferating. One of the major aspects of the ESG side of the insurance market which leads to this tendency to proliferation is the essentially subjective nature of the information on which investment selection can be made. By definition ESG data is qualitative; it is non-financial and not readily quantifiable in monetary terms. The investment market has long dealt with these intangibles—such variables as goodwill have been widely accepted as contributing to a company's value. But the ESG intangibles are not only highly subjective they are also particularly difficult to quantify and more importantly verify. A lack of clear standards and transparent monitoring has led to fears that ESG avowals mainly serve purposes of greenwashing and other company public relations objectives, while distracting from more substantive initiatives to improve environment and society.

One of the major issues in the ESG area is disclosure. Environmental risks created by business activities have actual or potential negative effects on air, land, water, ecosystems, and human health. The information on which an investor makes their decisions on a financial level is fairly simply gathered. The company's accounts can be examined, and although the accounting practices of corporate business are coming increasingly into disrepute after a spate of recent financial scandals, the figures are for the most part externally verifiable. With ESG considerations, the practice has been for the company under examination to provide its own figures and disclosures. These have seldom been externally verified and the lack of universal standards and regulation in the areas of environmental and social practice mean that the measurement of such statistics is subjective to say the least.

One of the solutions put forward to the inherent subjectivity of ESG data is the provision of universally accepted standards for the measurement of ESG factors. Such organizations as the ISO (International Organization for Standardization) provide highly researched and widely accepted standards for many of the areas covered. Some investment consultancies, such as Probus-Sigma have created methodologies for calculating the ratings for an ESG based Ratings Index that is both based on ISO standards and externally verified, but the formalization of the acceptance of such standards as the basis for calculating and verifying ESG disclosures is by no means universal.

The corporate governance side of the matter has received rather more in the way of regulation and standardization as there is a longer history of regulation in this area. In 1992 the London Stock Exchange and the Financial Reporting Commission set up the Cadbury Commission to investigate the series of governance failures that had plagued the City of London such as the bankruptcies of BCCI, Polly Peck, and Robert Maxwell's Mirror Group. The conclusions that the commission reached were compiled in 2003 into the Combined Code on Corporate Governance which has been widely accepted (if patchily applied) by the financial world as a benchmark for good governance practices.

In an interview with Yahoo! Finance Francis Menassa (JAR Capital) says, that "the EU's 2014 Non-Financial Reporting Directive will apply to every country on a national level to implement and requires large companies to disclose non-financial and diversity information. This also includes providing information on how they operate and manage social and environmental challenges. The aim is to help investors, consumers, policy makers, and other stakeholders to evaluate the non-financial performance of large companies. Ultimately, the Directive encourages European companies to develop a responsible approach to business".

One of the key areas of concern in the discussion as to the reliability of ESG disclosures is the establishment of credible ratings for companies as to ESG performance. The world's financial markets have all leapt to provide ESG relevant ratings indexes, the Dow Jones Sustainability Index, the FTSE4Good Index (which is co-owned by the London Stock Exchange and Financial Times), Bloomberg ESG data, the MSCI ESG Indices and the GRESB benchmarks.

European regulators have introduced concrete rules to deal with the problem of greenwashing. These include a package of legislative measures arising from the European Commission's Action Plan on Sustainable Finance.

In March 2021, the U.S. Securities and Exchange Commission (SEC) announced that examination of regulatory compliance related to disclosures for ESG would be an area of focus for the agency in 2021. In the same month, the Employee Benefits Security Administration (EBSA) of the U.S. Labor Department announced that it would review and not enforce a Trump administration final rule for fiduciaries in proxy voting under the Employee Retirement Income Security Act of 1974 (ERISA) to consider pecuniary interests only and not ESG factors in investments for 401(k)s pursuant to Executive Order 13990. In remarks made by video conference to the European Parliament Committee on Economic and Monetary Affairs in September 2021, SEC Chair Gary Gensler stated that the agency was preparing recommendations for new disclosure requirements for ESG investment funds. In October 2021, EBSA proposed reversing the Trump administration ERISA final rule for fiduciaries in proxy voting on ESG investments for 401(k)s.

In November 2021, the SEC rescinded a Trump administration rule issued in 2017 that permitted company managers to exclude ESG proposals from shareholders in annual proxy statements. In May 2022, the SEC proposed two rules changes to ESG investment fund qualifications to prevent greenwashing marketing practices and to increase disclosure requirements for achieving ESG effects. In October 2022, the SEC announced that it would re-open the public comment window for the ESG disclosure rules proposal due to a technical error with the SEC public comment internet submission form. In November 2022, EBSA announced a final rule removing the Trump administration pecuniary interest only requirement for fiduciaries in proxy voting under ERISA when considering ESG investments for 401(k)s. In March 2023, in the first veto of his administration, U.S. President Joe Biden rejected a bill passed by the 118th United States Congress on party-line votes to overturn the EBSA ERISA 401(k) fiduciary proxy voting rule for ESG investments finalized the previous November.

=== Reporting ===
Under ESG reporting, organizations are required to present data from financial and non-financial sources that shows they are meeting the standards of agencies such as the Sustainability Accounting Standards Board, the Global Reporting Initiative, and the Task Force on Climate-related Financial Disclosures. Data must also be made available to rating agencies and shareholders.

ESG reporting, which stands for Environmental, Social, and Governance reporting, is when a company shares information about its effect on the environment, society, and how it is governed. This kind of reporting is usually done on a voluntary basis, meaning companies choose to do it to be open and share important information with their stakeholders, including investors.

However, in some places like India and certain regions, there are rules that make ESG reporting a requirement for specific types of companies. For example, in India, there is a regulatory requirement called BRSR (Business Responsibility and Sustainability Reporting) that makes ESG reporting mandatory for the top 1000 companies based on their market value on the stock exchange. They have to provide this report to ensure transparency and disclosure regarding their sustainability and responsibility practices.

=== Litigation and oversight ===
The Kentucky Bankers Association of 150 banks doing business in Kentucky is suing Kentucky Attorney General Daniel Cameron over his investigating banks' ESG practices, such as commitments to combat climate change. In November 2022, the Kentucky Bankers Association sued Cameron in Franklin Circuit Court; Cameron had the case removed to the US District Court for the Eastern District of Kentucky before Judge Gregory Van Tatenhove, for whom Cameron was previously a law clerk. The association said Cameron has displayed "amazing and disturbing broad overreach" by overstepping his legal authority, and did not have authority to demand detailed information from banks as part of an investigation into their environmental lending practices, which it said was a big government intrusion on private businesses that could create "an ongoing state surveillance system."

In March 2021, the SEC also announced the creation of a task force to pursue enforcement cases against investment fund managers and public companies for deceptive marketing for ESG investment funds. In August 2021, the SEC and the Eastern New York U.S. Attorney's Office were reportedly investigating the DWS Group (the asset management division of Deutsche Bank) after its former chief sustainability officer leaked internal emails and company presentations to The Wall Street Journal that showed that the company had overstated its ESG investment efforts. In December 2021, the U.S. Justice Department informed Deutsche Bank that it may have violated its deferred prosecution agreement from the previous January for failing to inform prosecutors of their former chief sustainability officer's internal complaint about the DWS Group's overstating of its ESG investment efforts.

In March 2022, Deutsche Bank agreed to extend the term of an external compliance monitor until February 2023 from its 2015 settlement with the Justice Department to address its failure to disclose the internal ESG complaint from its former chief sustainability officer the previous August. In June 2023, the EU commission issued an ESG ratings regulation proposal to guarantee their integrity and transparency.

In June 2022, the SEC was reportedly investigating the ESG investment funds of Goldman Sachs for potential greenwashing. In November 2022, Goldman Sachs agreed to pay $4 million to settle the SEC investigation of the company's ESG funds for greenwashing without admitting or denying guilt of the SEC's allegations. In February 2023, the SEC Division of Examinations announced that oversight of ESG investment funds would be among six top priorities for the agency in 2023.

== Research findings ==
According to a 2021 study done by the NYU Stern Center for Sustainable Business, which looked at over 1,000 studies, "studies use different scores for different companies by different data providers."

Gallup finds that 28% of U.S. employees strongly agree with the statement, "My organization makes a positive impact on people and the planet."

Research shows that such intangible assets comprise an increasing percentage of future enterprise value.

A study published by the European Securities and Markets Authority has also found that "ESG generally improves returns and cuts client costs over time". Analysis over a five-year period showed stock funds weighted towards ESG scores generally performed higher: an increase in annual average return of 1.59% in European markets, 1.02% in Asia-Pacific markets, and 0.13-0.17% in North American and global markets.

In January 2023, a Rasmussen opinion poll in the U.S. reported that the proportion of Americans who considered the promotion of "causes like diversity and environmentalism" to be the most important aim for companies was 9%. 69% said that the focus should be on "providing quality goods and services," and 13% on "increasing profit". A poll by PricewaterhouseCoopers found that "83% of consumers think companies should be actively shaping ESG best practices", with 76% of consumers saying they would "discontinue relations with companies that treat employees, communities and the environment poorly".

=== Compromises in real-world useability ===
ESG guidelines among western European arms manufacturers have been criticised for compromising on practical battlefield durability over environmentally-friendly manufacturing practices. During the Russo-Ukrainian War, military weaponry and equipment supplied to the Armed Forces of Ukraine by western European countries containing electronic components with cable insulation made from corn fibre in place of synthetic insulators have succumbed to malfunction due to damage caused by rodents.

== See also ==
- Diversity, equity, and inclusion – Organizational frameworks and programs
- Equator Principles – Risk management framework
- Environmental full-cost accounting – Cost accounting method
- Environmental impact assessment – Assessment of the environmental consequences of a decision before action
- Exchange-traded fund – Investment fund traded on stock exchanges
- International Organization for Standardization – International standards development organization
- Sin industry – Legal commercial activities often considered to be immoral or unethical
- UN Sustainable Development Goals – United Nations goals for people for 2030
- Sustainable finance – Finance with an environmental objective
- Sustainability reporting – Reporting about ESG sustainability
- United Kingdom company law – Law that regulates corporations formed under the Companies Act 2006
- United States corporate law
