= 2001–02 Wrexham F.C. season =

Welsh football club season

Wrexham
2001–02 season
- Second Division: 23rd
- FA Cup: First Round
- League Cup: First Round
- League Trophy: Second Round
Home colours

The 2001–02 season saw Wrexham compete in Second Division where they finished in 23rd position with 43 points and were relegated to the Third Division.

== Final league table ==
Pos	Team	Pld	W	D	L	GF	GA	GD	Pts	Promotion or relegation
20	Northampton Town	46	14	7	25	54	79	−25	49	
21	Bournemouth (R)	46	10	14	22	56	71	−15	44	Relegation to Football League Third Division
22	Bury (R)	46	11	11	24	43	75	−32	44	Relegation to Football League Third Division
23	Wrexham (R)	46	11	10	25	56	89	−33	43	Relegation to Football League Third Division
24	Cambridge United (R)	46	7	13	26	47	93	−46	34	Relegation to Football League Third Division

Rules for classification: In the Football League goals scored (GF) takes precedence over goal difference (GD).
(R) Relegated

== Results ==
Wrexham's score comes first

=== Legend ===
Win	Draw	Loss

=== Football League Second Division ===
Match	Date	Opponent	Venue	Result	Attendance	Scorers
1	11 August 2001	Oldham Athletic	H	3–3	4,881	Lawrence, Edwards, Faulconbridge
2	18 August 2001	Wycombe Wanderers	A	2–5	5,425	Faulconbridge, Chalk
3	25 August 2001	Colchester United	H	1–1	2,952	Edwards
4	8 September 2001	Notts County	A	2–2	4,776	Faulconbridge, Trundle
5	11 September 2001	Bury	H	1–0	2,470	Trundle
6	14 September 2001	Brighton & Hove Albion	H	1–2	3,434	Thomas
7	18 September 2001	Chesterfield	A	2–3	3,538	Roberts, Ferguson
8	21 September 2001	Tranmere Rovers	A	0–5	10,285	
9	25 September 2001	Port Vale	H	1–3	3,091	Faulconbridge
10	29 September 2001	Peterborough United	H	1–2	2,640	Faulconbridge
11	13 October 2001	Queens Park Rangers	H	1–0	4,474	Blackwood
12	20 October 2001	Wigan Athletic	A	3–2	5,979	Hill, Sam, Faulconbridge
13	23 October 2001	Blackpool	H	1–1	5,640	Trundle
14	27 October 2001	Huddersfield Town	A	1–5	9,888	Chalk
15	4 November 2001	Cardiff City	H	1–3	5,832	Edwards
16	6 November 2001	Reading	A	0–2	8,081	
17	10 November 2001	Bournemouth	A	0–3	5,031	
18	20 November 2001	Cambridge United	A	2–0	2,648	Ferguson, Faulconbridge
19	24 November 2001	Stoke City	H	0–1	5,477	
20	27 November 2001	Swindon Town	A	1–3	4,127	Faulconbridge
21	1 December 2001	Northampton Town	H	3–2	2,708	Carey, Chalk, Ferguson
22	8 December 2001	Bristol City	H	0–2	3,091	
23	15 December 2001	Brentford	A	0–3	5,326	
24	22 December 2001	Bristol City	A	0–1	12,137	
25	26 December 2001	Notts County	H	2–1	3,707	Trundle, Phillips
26	29 December 2001	Reading	H	0–2	3,885	
27	5 January 2002	Colchester United	A	1–2	2,835	Thomas
28	12 January 2002	Wycombe Wanderers	H	0–0	2,752	
29	19 January 2002	Oldham Athletic	A	1–3	5,451	Morrell
30	26 January 2002	Swindon Town	H	2–2	2,879	Faulconbridge, Carey
31	29 January 2002	Bury	A	2–2	2,732	Sam (2)
32	2 February 2002	Peterborough United	A	3–2	4,675	Faulconbridge, Blackwood, Sam
33	9 February 2002	Wigan Athletic	H	2–0	4,135	Faulconbridge, Lawrence
34	16 February 2002	Queens Park Rangers	A	1–2	9,706	Thomas
35	23 February 2002	Brighton & Hove Albion	A	0–0	6,649	
36	26 February 2002	Tranmere Rovers	H	1–1	5,702	Trundle
37	2 March 2002	Chesterfield	H	0–1	3,328	
38	5 March 2002	Port Vale	A	3–1	4,436	Trundle (2), Edwards
39	9 March 2002	Brentford	H	0–3	3,343	
40	16 March 2002	Northampton Town	A	1–4	5,029	Trundle
41	22 March 2002	Cardiff City	A	2–3	15,702	Faulconbridge, Sam
42	30 March 2002	Huddersfield Town	H	1–1	4,448	Faulconbridge
43	1 April 2002	Blackpool	A	0–3	7,066	
44	6 April 2002	Cambridge United	H	5–0	2,581	Jones (5)
45	13 April 2002	Stoke City	A	0–1	14,298	
46	20 April 2002	Bournemouth	H	2–1	4,200	Edwards, Morrell

=== FA Cup ===
Match	Date	Opponent	Venue	Result	Attendance	Scorers
R1	18 November 2001	Hereford United	A	0–1	4,109	

=== Football League Cup ===
Match	Date	Opponent	Venue	Result	Attendance	Scorers
R1	21 August 2001	Hull City	H	2–3	1,761	Faulconbridge, Russell

=== Football League Trophy ===
Match	Date	Opponent	Venue	Result	Attendance	Scorers
R1	16 October 2001	Wigan Athletic	H	5–1	1,550	Thomas, Trundle (2), Morrell
R2	30 October 2001	Huddersfield Town	H	0–1	1,725	

== Squad statistics ==
No.	Pos.	Name	League		FA Cup		League Cup		Other		Total	
No.	Pos.	Name	Apps	Goals	Apps	Goals	Apps	Goals	Apps	Goals	Apps	Goals
1	GK	(Norway) Marius Røvde	12	0	0	0	0	0	0	0	12	0
2	DF	(Scotland) Willie Miller	5	0	0	0	0	0	1	0	6	0
3	DF	(Northern Ireland) Shaun Holmes	39(1)	0	1	0	1	0	1	0	42(1)	0
4	MF	(England) Martyn Chalk	17(6)	3	1	0	1	0	1	0	20(6)	3
5	DF	(Republic of Ireland) Brian Carey	16(2)	2	0	0	1	0	1	0	18(2)	2
6	DF	(Trinidad and Tobago) Dennis Lawrence	29(3)	2	0(1)	0	1	0	0	0	30(4)	2
7	MF	(Trinidad and Tobago) Carlos Edwards	10(15)	5	0	0	0(1)	0	0	0	10(16)	5
8	FW	(England) Craig Faulconbridge	36(1)	13	1	0	1	1	2	0	40(1)	14
9	FW	(Wales) Lee Trundle	30(6)	8	0	0	0	0	1(1)	2	31(7)	10
10	MF	(Scotland) Darren Ferguson	37(1)	3	1	0	1	0	2	0	41(1)	3
11	MF	(England) Kevin Russell	8(2)	0	0	0	0(1)	1	1	0	9(3)	1
12	MF	(England) Paul Barrett	10(5)	0	0	0	0	0	0(1)	0	10(6)	0
13	GK	(Wales) Dave Walsh	7(2)	0	0	0	0	0	1	0	8(2)	0
14	MF	(England) Robin Gibson	11(7)	0	1	0	0	0	0	0	12(7)	0
15	MF	(Wales) Stephen Roberts	24	1	1	0	0	0	2	0	27	1
16	MF	(Wales) Wayne Phillips	27	1	0	0	0	0	0	0	27	1
17	FW	(England) Andy Morrell	13(11)	2	0(1)	0	0	0	0(2)	2	13(16)	4
18	FW	(Republic of Ireland) Dave Warren	5	0	0	0	1	0	0	0	6	0
19	MF	(England) Steve Thomas	30(8)	3	0	0	1	0	2	1	33(8)	3
20	MF	(England) Michael Blackwood	21(10)	2	1	0	1	0	1	0	24(10)	2
21	GK	(England) Kristian Rogers	27	0	1	0	1	0	1	0	30	0
22	MF	(Wales) Mark Evans	0(4)	0	0	0	0	0	0	0	0(4)	0
23	FW	(Trinidad and Tobago) Hector Sam	15(14)	5	1	0	1	0	2	0	19(14)	5
24	DF	(England) Adrian Moody	0(1)	0	0	0	0	0	0	0	0(1)	0
25	DF	(England) Keith Hill	12	1	1	0	0	0	2	0	15	1
26	MF	(Northern Ireland) Jim Whitley	34	0	1	0	0	0	2	0	37	0
27	MF	(England) Kevin Sharp	12(3)	0	0	0	0	0	0	0	12(3)	0
28	DF	(England) Dan Bennett	5(1)	0	0	0	0	0	0	0	5(1)	0
31	DF	(England) Shaun Pejic	11(1)	0	0	0	0	0	0	0	11(1)	0
40	DF	(Wales) Craig Morgan	0(2)	0	0	0	0	0	0	0	0(2)	0
44	FW	(Wales) Lee Jones	3(1)	5	0	0	0	0	0	0	3(1)	5
