= 2002–03 Wrexham F.C. season =

Welsh football club season

- Manager: (England) Denis Smith
- Stadium: Racecourse Ground
- Third Division: 3rd (promoted)
- FA Cup: First round
- League Cup: Second round
- Football League Trophy: Northern quarter-finals
- Top goalscorer: Andy Morrell (34)
- Highest home attendance: 9,960 v Cambridge United
- Lowest home attendance: 2,968
- Average home league attendance: 4,263
Home colours

During the 2002–03 English football season, Wrexham competed in the Football League Third Division.

== Season summary ==
Wrexham finished third in the Third Division and thus gained automatic promotion to the Second Division.

== First-team squad ==
Squad at end of season

Note: Flags indicate national team as defined under FIFA eligibility rules; some limited exceptions apply. Players may hold more than one non-FIFA nationality.

No.	Pos.	Nation	Player
1	GK	WAL	Andy Dibble
2	MF	NIR	Jim Whitley
3	DF	NIR	Shaun Holmes
4	DF	WAL	Stephen Roberts
5	DF	IRL	Brian Carey
6	DF	TRI	Dennis Lawrence
7	MF	TRI	Carlos Edwards
8	FW	WAL	Lee Jones
9	FW	ENG	Lee Trundle
10	MF	SCO	Darren Ferguson
11	FW	ENG	Andy Morrell
12	MF	ENG	Paul Barrett
13	GK	ENG	Kristian Rogers

No.	Pos.	Nation	Player
14	DF	ENG	Paul Edwards
15	DF	SGP	Daniel Bennett
16	MF	WAL	Wayne Phillips
17	FW	ENG	Kevin Russell
18	DF	WAL	Shaun Pejic
19	FW	ENG	Steve Thomas
21	GK	WAL	Paul Whitfield
23	FW	TRI	Hector Sam
24	DF	WAL	Craig Morgan
25	MF	ENG	Mark Jones
26	DF	WAL	Simon Spender
29	DF	ENG	Scott Green

=== Left club during season ===
Note: Flags indicate national team as defined under FIFA eligibility rules; some limited exceptions apply. Players may hold more than one non-FIFA nationality.

No. / Pos. / Nation / Player; 20 / MF / ENG / Mark Evans (to Colwyn Bay)	No. / Pos. / Nation / Player; 22 / MF / WAL / Luke Campbell (to Colwyn Bay)

== League table ==
Pos	Team	Pld	W	D	L	GF	GA	GD	Pts	Promotion or relegation
1	Rushden & Diamonds (C, P)	46	24	15	7	73	47	+26	87	Promotion to Football League Second Division
2	Hartlepool United (P)	46	24	13	9	71	51	+20	85	Promotion to Football League Second Division
3	Wrexham (P)	46	23	15	8	84	50	+34	84	Promotion to Football League Second Division
4	Bournemouth (O, P)	46	20	14	12	60	48	+12	74	Qualification for the Third Division play-offs
5	Scunthorpe United	46	19	15	12	68	49	+19	72	Qualification for the Third Division play-offs

Rules for classification: In the Football League goals scored (GF) takes precedence over goal difference (GD).
(C) Champions; (O) Play-off winners; (P) Promoted

Leading goalscorer: Andy Morrell (Wrexham), 34
