= Wrexham A.F.C. league record by opponent =

Welsh football club statistics

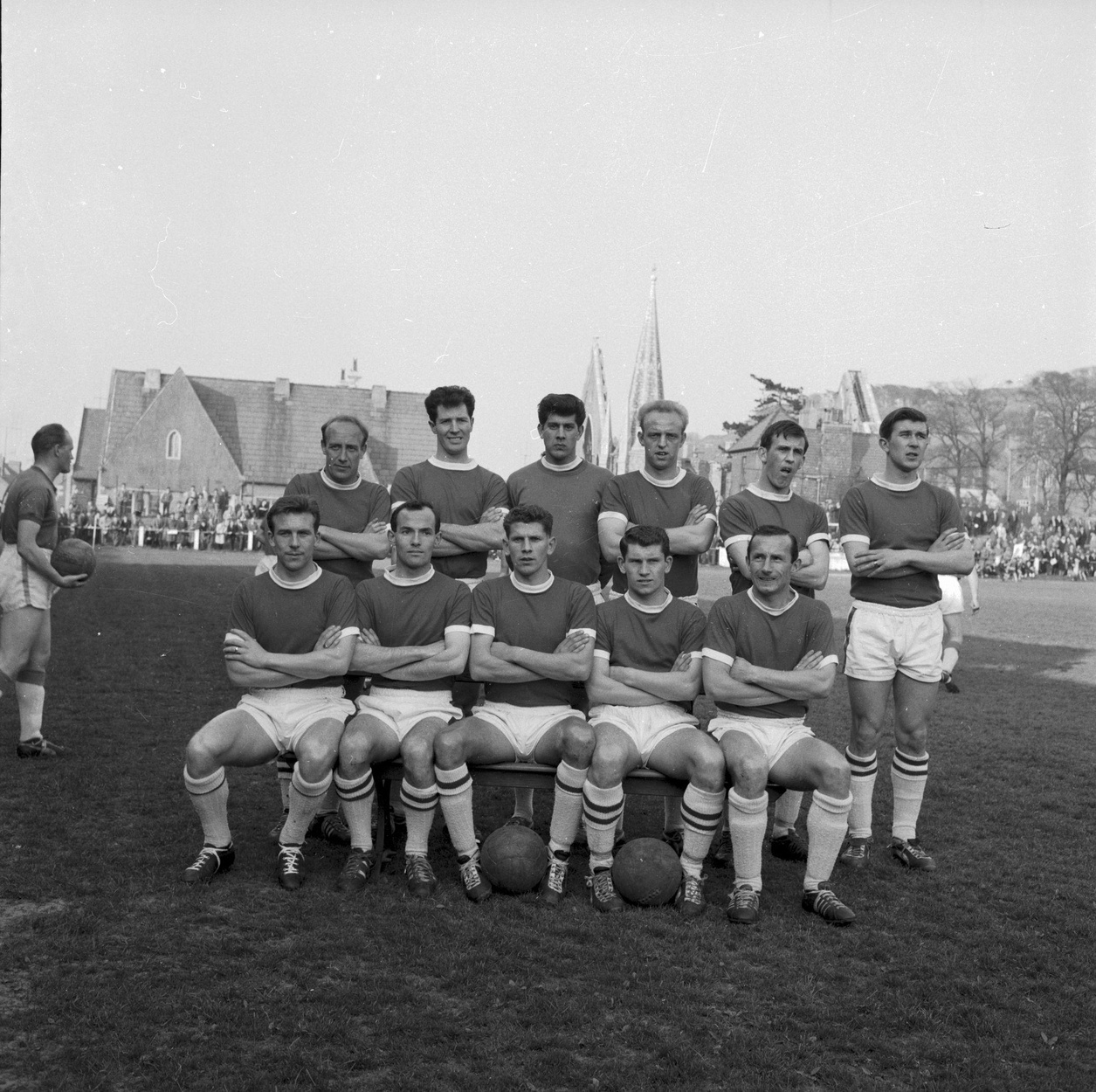
Wrexham A.F.C. was founded in 1864, but did not play league football until the 1890–91 season, when they joined The Combination. The team pictured above won promotion to the Third Division of the Football League in 1961–62.

Wrexham Association Football Club is a Welsh professional association football club based in Wrexham, Clwyd. Founded in 1864, it is the oldest club in Wales and the third-oldest professional association football team in the world.

Wrexham first played league football in the 1890–91 season, as co-founding members of the second incarnation of the Combination. The club played in the Welsh Senior League between 1894 and 1896, winning the title during both seasons, before returning to the Combination and winning the league four times in nine years. Wrexham played in the Birmingham & District League either side of the First World War, before being elected to the Football League in the 1921–22 season as co-founding members of the new Third Division North. The club remained in the Football League for over 80 years, winning a single Third Division title in 1977–78, before facing relegation to the Conference (later the National League) in 2007–08. After 15 years in non-league football, Wrexham achieved three consecutive promotions during the 2022–23, 2023–24 and 2024–25 seasons, and will play in the Championship in 2025–26.

Wrexham's men's first team have competed in a number of regionally and nationally contested leagues. Their record against each club faced in these competitions is listed below. The club's first league match was against Gorton Villa, their first Football League match was against Hartlepools United, and they met their 208th and most recent different league opponent, Dorking Wanderers, for the first time in the 2022–23 season. The team that Wrexham have met most often in league competition is Tranmere Rovers, who they first played in the 1897–98 Combination season; the 51 victories from 124 meetings is the joint-highest in the club's history, tied with Rochdale who they have beaten 51 times in 112 meetings. The club has drawn the most times in the league with Barrow — 35 times in 91 meetings — and lost the most times in the league against Chesterfield and Stockport County — 53 times in 116 and 115 meetings, respectively.

== Table key ==
- The table below includes results of matches played by Wrexham in the Combination, the Welsh Senior League, the Birmingham & District League, the Football League and the National League. Matches from the abandoned 1939–40 season are excluded, as are those played during the various wartime competitions.
- The name used for each opponent is that which they had when Wrexham most recently played a league match against them. Results against each opponent include results against that club under any former name.
- The columns headed "First" and "Last" contain the first and most recent seasons in which Wrexham played league matches against each opponent.
- † Clubs with this background and symbol in the "Opponent" column are Wrexham's divisional rivals in the current season.
- ‡ Clubs with this background and symbol in the "Opponent" column are defunct.

== League record ==
Results current as of 25 May 2025

Wrexham A.F.C. league record by opponent
Opponent	Pld	W	D	L	Pld	W	D	L	Pld	W	D	L	Win%	First	Last	Notes
Opponent	Home				Away				Total				Win%	First	Last	Notes
Aberystwyth Town	1	1	0	0	1	1	0	0	2	2	0	0	100.00	1899–1900	1899–1900	
Accrington Stanley	36	24	5	7	36	10	6	20	72	34	11	27	47.22	1921–22	2023–24	
AFC Bournemouth	21	11	3	7	21	7	4	10	42	18	7	17	42.86	1958–59	2004–05	
AFC Fylde	3	0	2	1	3	0	0	3	6	0	2	4	0.00	2017–18	2019–20	
AFC Telford United	3	2	0	1	3	3	0	0	6	5	0	1	83.33	2011–12	2014–15	
AFC Wimbledon	3	2	0	1	3	1	2	0	6	3	2	1	50.00	2009–10	2023–24	
Aldershot ‡	17	13	4	0	17	3	3	11	34	16	7	11	47.06	1960–61	1990–91	
Aldershot Town	10	7	1	2	10	3	2	5	20	10	3	7	50.00	2013–14	2022–23	
Alfreton Town	4	1	1	2	4	3	0	1	8	4	1	3	50.00	2011–12	2014–15	
Altrincham	8	4	1	3	8	5	3	0	16	9	4	3	56.25	2008–09	2022–23	
Ashington	8	5	2	1	8	1	5	2	16	6	7	3	37.50	1921–22	1928–29	
Aston Villa	12	4	2	6	12	2	0	10	24	6	2	16	25.00	1905–06	1971–72	
Bangor City ‡	7	7	0	0	7	2	2	3	14	9	2	3	64.29	1898–99	1904–05	
Barnet	13	7	3	3	12	6	3	3	25	13	6	6	52.00	1991–92	2022–23	
Barnsley	17	13	4	0	17	0	4	13	34	13	8	13	38.24	1932–33	2024–25	
Barton Rovers	1	1	0	0	1	1	0	0	2	2	0	0	100.00	1896–97	1896–97	
Barrow	46	25	16	5	45	9	19	17	91	34	35	22	37.36	1921–22	2023–24	
Bath City	2	2	0	0	2	2	0	0	4	4	0	0	100.00	2010–11	2011–12	
Birkenhead ‡	6	5	1	0	6	2	1	3	12	7	2	3	58.33	1899–1900	1904–05	
Birmingham City †	15	9	4	2	15	2	3	10	30	11	7	12	36.67	1905–06	2024–25	
Blackburn Rovers †	7	2	4	1	7	1	5	1	14	3	9	2	21.43	1971–72	1981–82	
Blackpool	15	3	5	7	15	3	3	9	30	6	8	16	20.00	1983–84	2024–25	
Bolton Wanderers	6	1	1	4	6	1	2	3	12	2	3	7	16.67	1971–72	2024–25	
Boreham Wood	7	6	0	1	8	5	3	0	15	11	3	1	73.33	2015–16	2022–23	
Boston United	3	2	1	0	3	0	1	2	6	2	2	2	33.33	2002–03	2006–07	
Bradford (Park Avenue)	22	16	3	3	22	8	3	11	44	24	6	14	54.55	1922–23	1969–70	
Bradford City	34	16	8	10	34	5	8	21	68	21	16	31	30.88	1927–28	2023–24	
Braintree Town	7	3	1	3	7	3	1	3	14	6	2	6	42.86	2011–12	2018–19	
Brentford	20	7	4	9	20	3	5	12	40	10	9	21	25.00	1958–59	2007–08	
Brierley Hill Alliance ‡	12	9	2	1	12	2	2	8	24	11	4	9	45.83	1905–06	1920–21	
Brighton & Hove Albion	14	4	5	5	14	2	4	8	28	6	9	13	21.43	1962–63	2003–04	
Bristol City †	12	5	3	4	12	2	1	9	24	7	4	13	29.17	1962–63	2004–05	
Bristol Rovers	23	14	6	3	23	4	4	15	46	18	10	18	39.13	1962–63	2024–25	
Bromley	8	7	1	0	8	2	3	3	16	9	4	3	56.25	2015–16	2022–23	
Broughton United ‡	2	2	0	0	2	2	0	0	4	4	0	0	100.00	1903–04	1904–05	
Brymbo Institute ‡	2	1	1	0	2	0	1	1	4	1	2	1	25.00	1894–95	1895–96	
Buckley ‡	1	1	0	0	1	1	0	0	2	2	0	0	100.00	1900–01	1900–01	
Burnley	15	4	4	7	15	4	3	8	30	8	7	15	26.67	1978–79	1999–2000	
Burton Albion	2	1	0	1	2	1	0	1	4	2	0	2	50.00	2008–09	2024–25	
Burton Swifts ‡	1	1	0	0	1	0	0	1	2	1	0	1	50.00	1890–91	1890–91	
Burton United ‡	3	3	0	0	3	2	0	1	6	5	0	1	83.33	1907–08	1909–10	
Bury	19	11	7	1	19	9	4	6	38	20	11	7	52.63	1957–58	2007–08	
Buxton	6	3	1	2	6	1	1	4	12	4	2	6	33.33	1891–92	1898–99	
Caergwrle	1	1	0	0	1	1	0	0	2	2	0	0	100.00	1894–95	1894–95	
Cambridge United	24	13	9	2	24	8	6	10	48	21	15	12	43.75	1973–74	2024–25	
Cardiff City †	15	6	2	7	15	2	4	9	30	8	6	16	26.67	1975–76	2001–02	
Carlisle United	37	28	7	2	37	11	10	16	74	39	17	18	52.70	1928–29	2005–06	
Charlton Athletic †	7	4	2	1	7	1	4	2	14	5	6	3	35.71	1972–73	2024–25	
Chelsea	3	2	0	1	3	0	1	2	6	2	1	3	33.33	1979–80	1981–82	
Cheltenham Town	2	2	0	0	2	0	1	1	4	2	1	1	50.00	2005–06	2015–16	
Chester	5	3	1	1	5	1	2	2	10	4	3	3	40.00	2013–14	2017–18	
Chester City ‡	49	24	12	13	49	14	11	24	98	38	23	37	38.78	1890–91	2009–10	
Chesterfield	58	25	17	16	58	11	10	37	116	36	27	53	31.03	1921–22	2022–23	
Chirk AAA	12	6	3	3	12	2	2	8	24	8	5	11	33.33	1891–92	1904–05	
Chorley	1	1	0	0	1	1	0	0	2	2	0	0	100.00	2019–20	2019–20	
Colchester United	26	12	7	7	26	8	8	10	52	20	15	17	38.46	1958–59	2023–24	
Coventry City †	12	7	1	4	12	2	2	8	24	9	3	12	37.50	1905–06	1963–64	
Crawley Town	5	3	1	1	5	2	0	3	10	5	1	4	50.00	2008–09	2024–25	
Crewe Alexandra	58	32	14	12	58	11	17	30	116	43	31	42	37.07	1896–97	2023–24	
Crystal Palace	8	0	3	5	8	0	1	7	16	0	4	12	0.00	1960–61	1981–82	
Dagenham & Redbridge	8	3	3	2	8	3	1	4	16	6	4	6	37.50	2007–08	2022–23	
Darlaston Town (1874)	6	4	2	0	6	3	1	2	12	7	3	2	58.33	1911–12	1920–21	
Darlington	47	30	11	6	47	8	14	25	94	38	25	31	40.43	1921–22	2011–12	
Dartford	3	0	1	2	3	2	0	1	6	2	1	3	33.33	2012–13	2014–15	
Denton ‡	2	1	0	1	2	0	1	1	4	1	1	2	25.00	1890–91	1891–92	
Derby County †	4	1	2	1	4	1	0	3	8	2	2	4	25.00	1955–56	1981–82	
Doncaster Rovers	34	15	9	10	34	3	15	16	68	18	24	26	26.47	1923–24	2023–24	
Dorking Wanderers	1	1	0	0	1	1	0	0	2	2	0	0	100.00	2022–23	2022–23	
Dover Athletic	6	1	3	2	7	2	1	4	13	3	4	6	23.08	2014–15	2021–22	
Dresden United ‡	2	1	1	0	2	0	1	1	4	1	2	1	25.00	1892–93	1893–94	
Druids ‡	6	5	0	1	6	4	1	1	12	9	1	2	75.00	1894–95	1904–05	
Dudley Town	10	6	4	0	10	0	4	6	20	6	8	6	30.00	1905–06	1914–15	
Durham City	7	6	1	0	7	0	1	6	14	6	2	6	42.86	1921–22	1927–28	
Eastbourne Borough	3	3	0	0	3	0	0	3	6	3	0	3	50.00	2008–09	2010–11	
Eastleigh	9	5	3	1	9	4	5	0	18	9	8	1	50.00	2014–15	2022–23	
Ebbsfleet United	7	6	1	0	7	2	1	4	14	8	2	4	57.14	2008–09	2019–20	
Everton	6	2	2	2	6	0	0	6	12	2	2	8	16.67	1891–92	1898–99	
Exeter City	17	8	7	2	17	4	5	8	34	12	12	10	35.29	1960–61	2024–25	
FC Halifax Town	9	4	5	0	8	2	2	4	17	6	7	4	35.29	2013–14	2022–23	
Fleetwood Town	2	1	1	0	2	0	1	1	4	1	2	1	25.00	2010–11	2011–12	
Forest Green Rovers	10	6	3	1	10	3	4	3	20	9	7	4	45.00	2008–09	2023–24	
Fulham	6	1	3	2	6	2	2	2	12	3	5	4	25.00	1970–71	1998–99	
Garston Copper Works ‡	2	2	0	0	2	0	2	0	4	2	2	0	50.00	1897–98	1898–99	
Gateshead	11	6	2	3	11	5	3	3	22	11	5	6	50.00	2009–10	2022–23	
Gateshead ‡	23	13	3	7	23	3	9	11	46	16	12	18	34.78	1928–29	1957–58	
Gillingham	17	11	4	2	17	5	4	8	34	16	8	10	47.06	1960–61	2023–24	
Gorton Villa ‡	3	1	1	1	3	1	0	2	6	2	1	3	33.33	1890–91	1892–93	
Grays Athletic	2	2	0	0	2	1	0	1	4	3	0	1	75.00	2008–09	2009–10	
Grimsby Town	35	18	8	9	35	8	7	20	70	26	15	29	37.14	1921–22	2023–24	
Guiseley	3	1	2	0	3	2	0	1	6	3	2	1	50.00	2015–16	2017–18	
Halesowen Town	5	5	0	0	5	1	0	4	10	6	0	4	60.00	1906–07	1910–11	
Halifax Town ‡	54	31	13	10	54	12	14	28	108	43	27	38	39.81	1921–22	1992–93	
Harrogate Town	3	1	2	0	3	1	2	0	6	2	4	0	33.33	2018–19	2023–24	
Hartlepool United	53	33	10	10	54	15	9	30	107	48	19	40	44.86	1921–22	2020–21	
Havant & Waterlooville	1	1	0	0	1	1	0	0	2	2	0	0	100.00	2018–19	2018–19	
Hayes & Yeading United	3	1	0	2	3	3	0	0	6	4	0	2	66.67	2009–10	2011–12	
Hednesford Town	2	2	0	0	2	0	0	2	4	2	0	2	50.00	1919–20	1920–21	
Hereford United ‡	18	7	6	5	18	3	5	10	36	10	11	15	27.78	1973–74	2013–14	
Histon	3	2	1	0	3	0	2	1	6	2	3	1	33.33	2008–09	2010–11	
Huddersfield Town	8	2	4	2	8	2	1	5	16	4	5	7	25.00	1973–74	2024–25	
Hudson's Athletic ‡	1	1	0	0	1	1	0	0	2	2	0	0	100.00	1900–01	1900–01	
Hull City †	19	13	3	3	19	4	4	11	38	17	7	14	44.74	1930–31	2004–05	
Hyde ‡	1	1	0	0	1	0	1	0	2	1	1	0	50.00	1890–91	1890–91	
Hyde United	2	1	1	0	2	1	0	1	4	2	1	1	50.00	2012–13	2013–14	
Kettering Town	4	3	0	1	4	1	2	1	8	4	2	2	50.00	2008–09	2011–12	
Kidderminster Harriers	21	9	6	6	21	8	2	11	42	17	8	17	40.48	1905–06	2015–16	
King's Lynn Town	2	2	0	0	2	2	0	0	4	4	0	0	100.00	2020–21	2021–22	
Leek ‡	4	2	1	1	4	2	1	1	8	4	2	2	50.00	1890–91	1893–94	
Leicester City †	3	0	2	1	3	0	1	2	6	0	3	3	0.00	1978–79	1981–82	
Lewes	1	1	0	0	1	1	0	0	2	2	0	0	100.00	2008–09	2008–09	
Leyton Orient	16	6	4	6	16	5	6	5	32	11	10	11	34.38	1978–79	2024–25	
Lincoln City	48	23	12	13	48	11	14	23	96	34	26	36	35.42	1921–22	2024–25	
Liverpool	1	0	0	1	1	0	0	1	2	0	0	2	0.00	1898–99	1898–99	
Llandudno Swifts ‡	1	1	0	0	1	1	0	0	2	2	0	0	100.00	1898–99	1898–99	
Luton Town	20	14	4	2	20	4	5	11	40	18	9	13	45.00	1963–64	2013–14	
Macclesfield Town ‡	16	6	5	5	16	3	2	11	32	9	7	16	28.13	1890–91	2017–18	
Maidenhead United	6	3	2	1	6	2	2	2	12	5	4	3	41.67	2017–18	2022–23	
Maidstone United	7	4	2	1	7	3	2	2	14	7	4	3	50.00	1989–90	2022–23	
Manchester City	1	0	0	1	1	0	1	0	2	0	1	1	0.00	1998–99	1998–99	
Mansfield Town	39	22	10	7	39	9	9	21	78	31	19	28	39.74	1932–33	2024–25	
Middleton ‡	1	1	0	0	1	0	1	0	2	1	1	0	50.00	1896–97	1896–97	
Middlewich Athletic ‡	3	3	0	0	3	2	0	1	6	5	0	1	83.33	1902–03	1904–05	
Millwall †	13	5	6	2	13	4	5	4	26	9	11	6	34.62	1960–61	2000–01	
Milton Keynes Dons	4	1	1	2	4	0	1	3	8	1	2	5	12.50	2004–05	2023–24	
Mold Red Stars ‡	1	1	0	0	1	1	0	0	2	2	0	0	100.00	1894–95	1894–95	
Morecambe	2	2	0	0	2	1	1	0	4	3	1	0	75.00	2007–08	2023–24	
Nantwich Town	6	6	0	0	6	2	0	4	12	8	0	4	66.67	1892–93	1904–05	
Nelson	9	7	2	0	9	2	0	7	18	9	2	7	50.00	1921–22	1930–31	
New Brighton ‡	21	10	6	5	21	4	8	9	42	14	14	14	33.33	1923–24	1950–51	
Newcastle United	4	2	2	0	4	1	0	3	8	3	2	3	37.50	1978–79	1981–82	
Newport County	14	8	4	2	14	3	4	7	28	11	8	9	39.29	1958–59	2023–24	
Newton-le-Willows ‡	3	3	0	0	3	1	1	1	6	4	1	1	66.67	1900–01	1902–03	
Newtown	1	1	0	0	1	0	1	0	2	1	1	0	50.00	1899–1900	1899–1900	
North Ferriby United ‡	1	1	0	0	1	0	1	0	2	1	1	0	50.00	2016–17	2016–17	
Northampton Town	17	8	2	7	17	8	5	4	34	16	7	11	47.06	1960–61	2024–25	
Northwich Victoria	5	3	2	0	5	2	1	2	10	5	3	2	50.00	1890–91	2008–09	
Norwich City †	3	0	0	3	3	0	1	2	6	0	1	5	0.00	1958–59	1981–82	
Notts County	28	16	7	5	29	3	9	17	57	19	16	22	33.33	1958–59	2023–24	
Nuneaton Town	5	5	0	0	5	1	2	2	10	6	2	2	60.00	1919–20	2014–15	
Oldham Athletic	34	15	11	8	34	11	9	14	68	26	20	22	38.24	1935–36	2022–23	
Oswestry Town ‡	7	7	0	0	7	5	2	0	14	12	2	0	85.71	1898–99	1904–05	
Oxford United †	12	6	5	1	12	4	3	5	24	10	8	6	41.67	1964–65	2009–10	
Peterborough United	28	10	11	7	28	7	6	15	56	17	17	22	30.36	1960–61	2024–25	
Plymouth Argyle	13	5	4	4	13	5	4	4	26	10	8	8	38.46	1958–59	2003–04	
Port Sunlight ‡	1	1	0	0	1	1	0	0	2	2	0	0	100.00	1904–05	1904–05	
Port Vale	32	15	11	6	32	7	8	17	64	22	19	23	34.38	1901–02	2004–05	
Portsmouth †	3	2	0	1	3	2	0	1	6	4	0	2	66.67	1976–77	1982–83	
Preston North End †	15	5	7	3	15	3	2	10	30	8	9	13	26.67	1970–71	1999–2000	
Queens Park Rangers †	9	3	2	4	9	2	2	5	18	5	4	9	27.78	1958–59	2003–04	
Reading	14	7	1	6	14	2	2	10	28	9	3	16	32.14	1958–59	2024–25	
Rhos ‡	2	2	0	0	2	2	0	0	4	4	0	0	100.00	1894–95	1895–96	
Rhostyllen Victoria ‡	2	2	0	0	2	2	0	0	4	4	0	0	100.00	1894–95	1895–96	
Rhyl ‡	7	6	0	1	7	3	1	3	14	9	1	4	64.29	1898–99	1904–05	
Rochdale	56	37	11	8	56	14	11	31	112	51	22	39	45.54	1921–22	2007–08	
Rock Ferry ‡	2	1	1	0	2	0	1	1	4	1	2	1	25.00	1896–97	1897–98	
Rotherham County ‡	2	2	0	0	2	1	0	1	4	3	0	1	75.00	1923–24	1924–25	
Rotherham United	35	21	6	8	35	10	10	15	70	31	16	23	44.29	1925–26	2024–25	
Rushden & Diamonds ‡	6	2	2	2	6	2	4	0	12	4	6	2	33.33	2002–03	2010–11	
Salford City	2	2	0	0	2	0	0	2	4	2	0	2	50.00	2018–19	2023–24	
Salisbury City ‡	3	0	2	1	3	1	1	1	6	1	3	2	16.67	2008–09	2013–14	
Scarborough ‡	6	3	0	3	6	2	1	3	12	5	1	6	41.67	1987–88	1992–93	
Scunthorpe United	23	13	3	7	23	4	7	12	46	17	10	19	36.96	1950–51	2022–23	
Sheffield United †	2	2	0	0	2	0	1	1	4	2	1	1	50.00	1978–79	1982–83	
Sheffield Wednesday †	7	2	2	3	7	2	0	5	14	4	2	8	28.57	1975–76	2004–05	
Shrewsbury Town	35	19	6	10	35	14	5	16	70	33	11	26	47.14	1905–06	2024–25	
Solihull Moors	7	6	1	0	7	2	2	3	14	8	3	3	57.14	2016–17	2022–23	
South Liverpool ‡	1	1	0	0	1	1	0	0	2	2	0	0	100.00	1898–99	1898–99	
Southampton †	2	1	0	1	2	1	0	1	4	2	0	2	50.00	1958–59	1959–60	
Southend United	21	13	6	2	21	5	8	8	42	18	14	10	42.86	1958–59	2022–23	
Southport	43	27	11	5	43	12	12	19	86	39	23	24	45.35	1921–22	2016–17	
Stafford Rangers	7	6	1	0	7	2	1	4	14	8	2	4	57.14	1905–06	1911–12	
Stalybridge Celtic	2	2	0	0	2	0	0	2	4	2	0	2	50.00	1921–22	1922–23	
Stevenage	3	1	0	2	3	1	1	1	6	2	1	3	33.33	2008–09	2024–25	
Stockport County	58	30	9	19	57	12	11	34	115	42	20	53	36.52	1891–92	2024–25	
Stoke City †	22	8	1	13	22	4	3	15	44	12	4	28	27.27	1891–92	2001–02	
Stourbridge	12	10	1	1	12	3	2	7	24	13	3	8	54.17	1905–06	1920–21	
Sunderland	2	0	0	2	2	0	1	1	4	0	1	3	0.00	1978–79	1979–80	
Sutton United	6	4	2	0	6	1	2	3	12	5	4	3	41.67	2016–17	2023–24	
Swansea City †	15	10	4	1	15	5	3	7	30	15	7	8	50.00	1967–68	2002–03	
Swindon Town	17	8	5	4	17	4	3	10	34	12	8	14	35.29	1958–59	2023–24	
Tamworth	5	3	2	0	5	2	2	1	10	5	4	1	50.00	2009–10	2013–14	
Telford United ‡	11	9	2	0	11	1	4	6	22	10	6	6	45.45	1901–02	1920–21	
Torquay United	25	13	7	5	26	6	7	13	51	19	14	18	37.25	1964–65	2022–23	
Tranmere Rovers	62	31	18	13	62	20	10	32	124	51	28	45	41.13	1897–98	2023–24	
Walsall	44	27	11	6	44	11	11	22	88	38	22	28	43.18	1905–06	2023–24	
Warrington ‡	1	1	0	0	1	1	0	0	2	2	0	0	100.00	1900–01	1900–01	
Watford †	10	6	2	2	10	1	2	7	20	7	4	9	35.00	1962–63	1997–98	
Wealdstone	3	2	1	0	3	1	1	1	6	3	2	1	50.00	2020–21	2022–23	
Wednesbury Old Athletic ‡	7	7	0	0	7	2	3	2	14	9	3	2	64.29	1910–11	1920–21	
Welling United	3	3	0	0	3	1	1	1	6	4	1	1	66.67	2013–14	2015–16	
West Bromwich Albion †	12	7	1	4	12	2	4	6	24	9	5	10	37.50	1905–06	1920–21	
West Ham United	3	2	1	0	3	0	1	2	6	2	2	2	33.33	1978–79	1980–81	
Westminster Rovers ‡	2	2	0	0	2	1	1	0	4	3	1	0	75.00	1894–95	1895–96	
Weymouth	3	3	0	0	3	3	0	0	6	6	0	0	100.00	2008–09	2021–22	
Whitchurch ‡	1	1	0	0	1	1	0	0	2	2	0	0	100.00	1904–05	1904–05	
White Star Wanderers ‡	4	2	2	0	4	0	2	2	8	2	4	2	25.00	1897–98	1902–03	
Wigan Athletic	7	2	3	2	7	2	3	2	14	4	6	4	28.57	1982–83	2024–25	
Wigan Borough ‡	10	8	1	1	10	0	4	6	20	8	5	7	40.00	1921–22	1931–32	
Willenhall Swifts ‡	6	4	2	0	6	2	1	3	12	6	3	3	50.00	1911–12	1920–21	
Winsford United	2	1	1	0	2	1	0	1	4	2	1	1	50.00	1902–03	1903–04	
Witton Albion	3	3	0	0	3	3	0	0	6	6	0	0	100.00	1901–02	1903–04	
Woking	11	7	2	2	11	3	4	4	22	10	6	6	45.45	2008–09	2022–23	
Wolverhampton Wanderers	15	10	4	1	15	4	2	9	30	14	6	10	46.67	1905–06	1987–88	
Worcester City	12	9	2	1	12	4	1	7	24	13	3	8	54.17	1905–06	1920–21	
Workington	12	7	3	2	12	1	2	9	24	8	5	11	33.33	1951–52	1969–70	
Wycombe Wanderers	13	6	4	3	13	2	6	5	26	8	10	8	30.77	1994–95	2024–25	
Yeovil Town	4	2	1	1	4	2	1	1	8	4	2	2	50.00	2019–20	2022–23	
York City	53	28	17	8	53	8	17	28	106	36	34	36	33.96	1929–30	2022–23	
