= Carlos Edwards =

Trinidad and Tobago footballer

Carlos Edwards CM
- Edwards in 2016

Personal information
- Full name: Akenhaton Carlos Edwards
- Date of birth: 24 October 1978 (age 48)
- Place of birth: Diego Martin, Trinidad and Tobago
- Height: 5 ft 11 in (1.80 m)
- Positions: Winger; right-back

Team information
- Current team: Lakenheath

Senior career*
| Years | Team | Apps | (Gls) |
| 1996–1998 | Patna United | | |
| 1998 | Queen's Park CC | | |
| 1999–2000 | Defence Force | | |
| 2000–2005 | Wrexham | 166 | (23) |
| 2005–2007 | Luton Town | 68 | (8) |
| 2007–2009 | Sunderland | 50 | (5) |
| 2008 | → Wolverhampton Wanderers (loan) | 6 | (0) |
| 2009–2014 | Ipswich Town | 176 | (9) |
| 2014 | → Millwall (loan) | 8 | (1) |
| 2014–2016 | Millwall | 23 | (0) |
| 2016–2017 | Ma Pau Stars | | |
| 2017 | Central FC | 0 | (0) |
| 2017–2020 | Woodbridge Town | 80 | (32) |
| 2020–2023 | Bury Town | 44 | (2) |
| 2023–2025 | Hadleigh United | 33 | (7) |
| 2025– | Lakenheath | 8 | (1) |

International career^{‡}
| 1999–2017 | Trinidad and Tobago | 92 | (4) |

Managerial career
- 2019–2020: Woodbridge Town
- * Club domestic league appearances and goals as of 18:00, 2 December 2025 (UTC) ‡ National team caps and goals as of 17:32, 2 February 2020 (UTC)

Akenhaton Carlos Edwards (born 24 October 1978) is a Trinidadian football player and coach who plays as a winger or right-back for Eastern Counties League Premier Division club Lakenheath.

He started his footballing career in Trinidad and Tobago before moving to Wrexham in 2000 for whom he made over 150 appearances. He went on to play for Luton Town, Sunderland, Wolverhampton Wanderers, Ipswich Town and Millwall.

Edwards also made over 90 appearances for the Trinidad and Tobago national football team, scoring four goals. As a member of the squad that competed at the 2006 FIFA World Cup in Germany, he was awarded the Chaconia Medal (Gold Class), the second highest state decoration of Trinidad and Tobago.

== Club career ==
Edwards, a right-winger also adept at right-back, started his professional career at Defence Force in his native Trinidad and Tobago, where he had attended the same school (St Anthony's College in Westmoorings) as future team-mate Kenwyne Jones.

=== Wrexham ===
Edwards was later signed by Wrexham for £250,000 in 2000, along with Dennis Lawrence and Hector Sam, after a trial.

Edwards helped the club win promotion to the Second Division in 2002–03, scoring 10 goals and winning Wrexham's Player of the Year award and being selected for the PFA Third Division Team of the Year along the way. He then added a further five goals the following season as the club finished mid-table, with Edwards again voted into the PFA Team of the Year.

However, Edwards suffered a knee injury while on international duty in 2004 that put him on the sidelines for most of the 2004–05 season. The campaign ended in relegation for the club but he won his first silverware in English football in the form of the 2005 Football League Trophy.

=== Luton Town ===
With his Wrexham contract having expired, Edwards joined Championship side Luton Town in 2005 in a three-year deal on a Bosman transfer. At Luton, he became popular with the fans with his flair and ability, winning the Young Members Player of the Season award in his first season with the club.

=== Sunderland ===
Edwards' form attracted a £1.5 million bid from Sunderland whom he joined on 2 January 2007, signing a three-and-a-half-year contract. Edwards began his Sunderland career brightly and scored five times in the remainder of the campaign. It was his 80th-minute winner against Burnley that confirmed Sunderland's promotion to the Premier League, after Derby County failed to beat Crystal Palace the following day.

Edwards' first season in the top flight was ruined by injury problems though. He suffered a hamstring injury in only the second game and after returning, had a leg fracture that again put him on the sidelines. He managed to return for the final months of the campaign that saw Sunderland retain their Premier League status.

After a spree of summer signings left Edwards largely out of contention at his parent club, he joined Championship side Wolverhampton Wanderers on 2 October 2008 on a three-month loan. However, he was recalled early by the Black Cats on 20 November after six appearances for Wolves.

=== Ipswich Town ===
On 1 September 2009, Edwards and Grant Leadbitter signed for Ipswich Town for a combined fee of £4 million. He scored his first goal for Ipswich in a 1–0 win at Sheffield Wednesday on 20 February 2010. He quickly became a key player at Ipswich, making 30 appearances during his first season at the club.

He scored his first goal of the 2010–11 season on 21 August, scoring the winning goal in a 2–1 away win over Crystal Palace. Edwards played purely as a right winger under Roy Keane but switched to right-back when Paul Jewell became manager in January 2011. He scored the winning goal in a 3–2 win over Doncaster Rovers on 22 January. He only missed one league game during the 2010–11, while also playing a key role as Ipswich made the semi-final of the League Cup, starting in the 1–0 win over Arsenal in the first-leg at Portman Road, while also starting in the second-leg at the Emirates Stadium as Ipswich exited the cup after a 3–0 loss.

He continued to be a regular starter in the 2011–12 season. Edwards became Ipswich captain in March 2012. He started all but one league game during the season, with his performances earning him the Players' Player of the Year award for the 2011–12 season.

He kept his place as captain the following season, playing a key part in the first-team during the 2012–13 season as Ipswich recovered from a poor start to the season resulting in the sacking of manager Paul Jewell, to pick-up in the second half of the season following the arrival of new manager Mick McCarthy. He scored late winners in 1–0 wins over Bolton Wanderers and Derby County. He made 46 appearances in all competitions during the season.

Edwards featured less regularly during the 2013–14 season, scoring once in 18 appearances up until January.

=== Millwall ===
On 27 March 2014, Edwards joined fellow Championship side Millwall on loan until 3 May 2014. His first goal for Millwall on 8 April, netting the winning goal in a 1–0 away win over Wigan Athletic at the DW Stadium. He made 8 appearances during his loan spell at Millwall.

On 21 May 2014, Edwards joined Millwall permanently on a free transfer, signing a contract until June 2015. The veteran started the 2014–15 season in the first-team. On 22 September 2014, he suffered a serious knee injury during Millwall's 0–0 draw against Nottingham Forest ruling him out for the rest of the 2014–2015 campaign.

On 24 August 2015, Edwards re-joined Millwall on a short-term deal until January 2016, following his earlier release from the club. He made 22 appearances during the season, helping Millwall reach the 2016 Football League One play-off final, starting at right-back as Millwall lost out 1–3 to Barnsley.

=== Ma Pau ===
In October 2016, Edwards joined Ma Pau Stars.

=== Central FC ===
Edwards joined Central FC in May 2017 for the Caribbean Cup on a three-week contract.

=== Woodbridge Town ===
In December 2017, Edwards returned to Suffolk to play for non-League club Woodbridge Town. He was appointed joint manager of the club in April 2019. In January 2020, he signed dual registration terms with Bury Town, allowing him to play for Bury when Woodbridge were not playing.

=== Bury Town ===
In September 2020, it was announced Edwards had joined Isthmian League side Bury Town full time for the 2020–21 season after leaving his position at Woodbridge Town.

=== Hadleigh United ===
In June 2023, it was announced that Carlos Edwards would become Hadleigh United’s first signing of the summer after leaving Bury Town. During his time at Hadleigh, Edwards made 36 appearances in all competitions, scoring seven goals.

=== Lakenheath ===
Prior to the 2025–26 season, Edwards signed for Lakenheath.

== International career ==
Edwards made his international debut for the Trinidad and Tobago national team on 5 June 1999 against Grenada in the 1999 Caribbean Cup, despite never having appeared at any youth level for his country before.

After winning that tournament, Edwards went on to become an established international and was part of the team that reached the World Cup Finals for the first time in the country's history and was duly selected for the squad for the 2006 World Cup in Germany. He played every minute of their participation during the competition, against Sweden, England and Paraguay, respectively.

== Personal life ==
Edwards' full name contains the name of Eighteenth Dynasty Ancient Egyptian ruler Akhenaten.

== Career statistics ==
=== Club ===
As of match played 29 May 2016

Appearances and goals by club, season and competition
| Club | Season | League | | | FA Cup | | League Cup | | Other | | Total | |
| Club | Season | Division | Apps | Goals | Apps | Goals | Apps | Goals | Apps | Goals | Apps | Goals |
|---|---|---|---|---|---|---|---|---|---|---|---|---|
| Wrexham | 2000–01 | Second Division | 36 | 4 | 1 | 0 | 2 | 0 | 0 | 0 | 39 | 4 |
| Wrexham | 2001–02 | Second Division | 26 | 5 | 0 | 0 | 1 | 0 | 0 | 0 | 27 | 5 |
| Wrexham | 2002–03 | Third Division | 44 | 8 | 1 | 0 | 2 | 1 | 2 (Note: Appearance(s) in Football League Trophy) | 1 | 49 | 10 |
| Wrexham | 2003–04 | Second Division | 42 | 5 | 1 | 0 | 1 | 0 | 1 | 0 | 45 | 5 |
| Wrexham | 2004–05 | League One | 18 | 1 | 0 | 0 | 0 | 0 | 3 | 0 | 21 | 1 |
| Wrexham | Total | | 166 | 23 | 3 | 0 | 6 | 1 | 6 | 1 | 181 | 25 |
| Luton Town | 2005–06 | Championship | 42 | 2 | 1 | 0 | 2 | 0 | — | | 45 | 2 |
| Luton Town | 2006–07 | Championship | 26 | 6 | 0 | 0 | 3 | 0 | — | | 29 | 6 |
| Luton Town | Total | | 68 | 8 | 1 | 0 | 5 | 0 | — | | 74 | 8 |
| Sunderland | 2006–07 | Championship | 15 | 5 | 1 | 0 | 0 | 0 | — | | 16 | 5 |
| Sunderland | 2007–08 | Premier League | 13 | 0 | 0 | 0 | 0 | 0 | — | | 13 | 0 |
| Sunderland | 2008–09 | Premier League | 22 | 0 | 3 | 0 | 1 | 0 | — | | 26 | 0 |
| Sunderland | 2009–10 | Premier League | 0 | 0 | 0 | 0 | 1 | 0 | — | | 1 | 0 |
| Sunderland | Total | | 50 | 5 | 4 | 0 | 2 | 0 | — | | 56 | 5 |
| Wolverhampton Wanderers (loan) | 2008–09 | Championship | 6 | 0 | 0 | 0 | 0 | 0 | — | | 6 | 0 |
| Wolverhampton Wanderers (loan) | Total | | 6 | 0 | 0 | 0 | 0 | 0 | — | | 6 | 0 |
| Ipswich Town | 2009–10 | Championship | 28 | 2 | 2 | 0 | 0 | 0 | — | | 30 | 2 |
| Ipswich Town | 2010–11 | Championship | 45 | 3 | 1 | 0 | 5 | 1 | — | | 51 | 4 |
| Ipswich Town | 2011–12 | Championship | 45 | 0 | 1 | 0 | 0 | 0 | — | | 46 | 0 |
| Ipswich Town | 2012–13 | Championship | 43 | 3 | 1 | 0 | 2 | 0 | — | | 46 | 3 |
| Ipswich Town | 2013–14 | Championship | 15 | 1 | 2 | 0 | 1 | 0 | — | | 18 | 1 |
| Ipswich Town | Total | | 176 | 9 | 7 | 0 | 8 | 1 | — | | 191 | 10 |
| Millwall | 2013–14 | Championship | 8 | 1 | 0 | 0 | 0 | 0 | — | | 8 | 1 |
| Millwall | 2014–15 | Championship | 8 | 0 | 0 | 0 | 0 | 0 | — | | 8 | 0 |
| Millwall | 2015–16 | League One | 15 | 0 | 1 | 0 | 0 | 0 | 6 (Note: Three appearances in Football League Trophy, three appearances in League One play-offs) | 0 | 22 | 0 |
| Millwall | Total | | 31 | 2 | 0 | 0 | 0 | 0 | 6 | 0 | 38 | 1 |
| Career total | | | 497 | 46 | 16 | 0 | 21 | 2 | 12 | 1 | 546 | 49 |

=== International ===
Appearances and goals by national team and year
| National team | Year | Apps | Goals |
|---|---|---|---|
Trinidad and Tobago
| Trinidad and Tobago | 1999 | 1 | 0 |
| Trinidad and Tobago | 2000 | 12 | 0 |
| Trinidad and Tobago | 2001 | 6 | 0 |
| Trinidad and Tobago | 2003 | 8 | 0 |
| Trinidad and Tobago | 2004 | 5 | 0 |
| Trinidad and Tobago | 2005 | 13 | 1 |
| Trinidad and Tobago | 2006 | 11 | 0 |
| Trinidad and Tobago | 2008 | 11 | 1 |
| Trinidad and Tobago | 2009 | 10 | 2 |
| Trinidad and Tobago | 2011 | 4 | 0 |
| Trinidad and Tobago | 2013 | 6 | 0 |
| Trinidad and Tobago | 2016 | 2 | 0 |
| Trinidad and Tobago | 2017 | 7 | 0 |
| Total | | 92 | 4 |

Scores and results list Trinidad and Tobago's goal tally first, score column indicates score after each Edwards goal.

List of international goals scored by Carlos Edwards
| No. | Date | Venue | Opponent | Score | Result | Competition |
|---|---|---|---|---|---|---|
| 1 | 26 March 2005 | Estadio Mateo Flores, Guatemala City, Guatemala | Guatemala | 1–2 | 1–5 | 2006 FIFA World Cup qualification |
| 2 | 3 September 2008 | Hasely Crawford Stadium, Port of Spain, Trinidad and Tobago | Guyana | 1–0 | 3–0 | Friendly |
| 3 | 11 February 2009 | Estadio Cuscatlán, San Salvador, El Salvador | El Salvador | 1–0 | 2–2 | 2010 FIFA World Cup qualification |
| 4 | 6 June 2009 | Dwight Yorke Stadium, Scarborough, Trinidad and Tobago | Costa Rica | 1–0 | 2–3 | 2010 FIFA World Cup qualification |

== Honours ==
Wrexham

- FAW Premier Cup: 2000–01, 2002–03, 2003–04
- Football League Third Division promoted: 2002–03
- Football League Trophy: 2004–05

Sunderland

- Football League Championship: 2006–07

Trinidad and Tobago

- Caribbean Cup: 1999, 2001

Individual

- Wrexham Player of the Year: 2002–03
- PFA Team of the Year: 2002–03 Third Division, 2003–04 Second Division, 2006–07 Championship
- Ipswich Town Players' Player of the Year: 2011–12

Medals

- Chaconia Medal Gold Class: 2006
