= Shaun Pejic =

British footballer

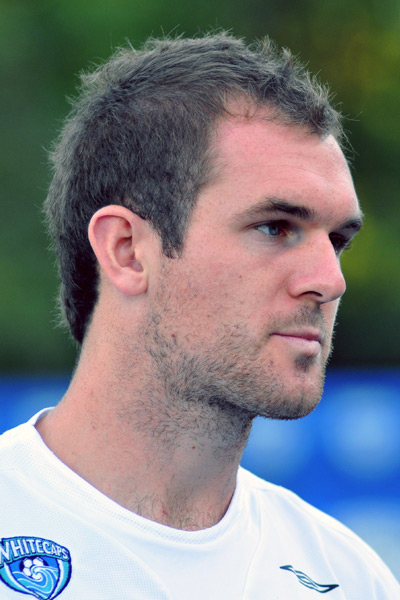
- Pejic with Vancouver Whitecaps in 2009

Personal information
- Full name: Shaun Melvyn Pejic
- Date of birth: 16 November 1982 (age 43)
- Place of birth: Hereford, England
- Height: 6 ft 1 in (1.85 m)
- Position: Defender

Youth career
- –2000: Wrexham

Senior career*
Years	Team	Apps	(Gls)
2000–2009	Wrexham	175	(0)
2009	York City	15	(0)
2009	Vancouver Whitecaps	9	(0)
2010	Crystal Palace Baltimore	19	(2)
2011	Barrow	0	(0)
2011–2012	Bangor City	11	(1)
Total		229	(3)

International career
2003	Wales U20	1	(0)
2002–2003	Wales U21	6	(0)
- * Club domestic league appearances and goals

Shaun Melvyn Pejic (born 16 November 1982) is a former professional footballer who played as a defender. He played club football in England, Wales, Canada and the United States and represented Wales at under-20 and under-21 levels. He works as a FIFA gameplay producer for EA Sports.

== Club career ==
=== Wrexham ===
Born in Hereford, Herefordshire, Pejic began his career with Wrexham at the age of 14, before training on a Youth Training Scheme and signing a professional contract on 9 August 2002. He made his first-team debut in a 1–1 draw away to Port Vale in April 2001. He broke into the first-team squad in February 2002, making 12 appearances for Wrexham in the remainder of the 2001–02 season. He made 32 appearances in the 2002–03 season, helping Wrexham to promotion to the Second Division and to win the FAW Premier Cup. A hairline fracture of his leg ended his 2003–04 season early after he had made 23 appearances. He signed a new two-year contract in May 2004.

Pejic impressed in a 3–2 win away to Notts County in a Football League Trophy match in September 2004, leading manager Denis Smith to say of him, "Our young central three haven't played together much, but Pejic was immense again, his defensive header in the last minute was worth a goal. He's come on again this season – that's good as we are expecting boys to do men's jobs." It was in this match that Pejic scored his only goal for the club. He featured for Wrexham in the 2005 Football League Trophy Final on 10 April 2005, after coming on as a substitute for Stephen Roberts on 14 minutes, which finished in a 2–0 victory over Southend United after extra time. He made 44 appearances in 2004–05, which saw Wrexham go into administration and relegated to League Two. Pejic missed four months of 2005–06 after tearing cruciate knee ligaments in August 2005 but returned in January 2006, helping Wrexham to the final of the FAW Premier Cup for the second year in succession. He agreed to a one-year extension to his contract in June 2006.

Pejic formed a good partnership at centre back with Steve Evans in 2006–07 with manager Denis Smith saying after beating Scunthorpe United in December 2006, "Scunthorpe have got two of the best strikers outside the Championship and my two centre-backs kept them quiet, they are starting to perform consistently as a pair, so that's good." He made 37 appearances as Wrexham avoided relegation to the Conference Premier on the final day of the season and signed a new two-year contract a month later. He made 22 appearances in 2007–08 as Wrexham were relegated to the Conference Premier. Pejic stayed at the club but rarely featured during the first half of the season and was released, along with Steve Evans, on 2 February 2009.

=== Later career ===
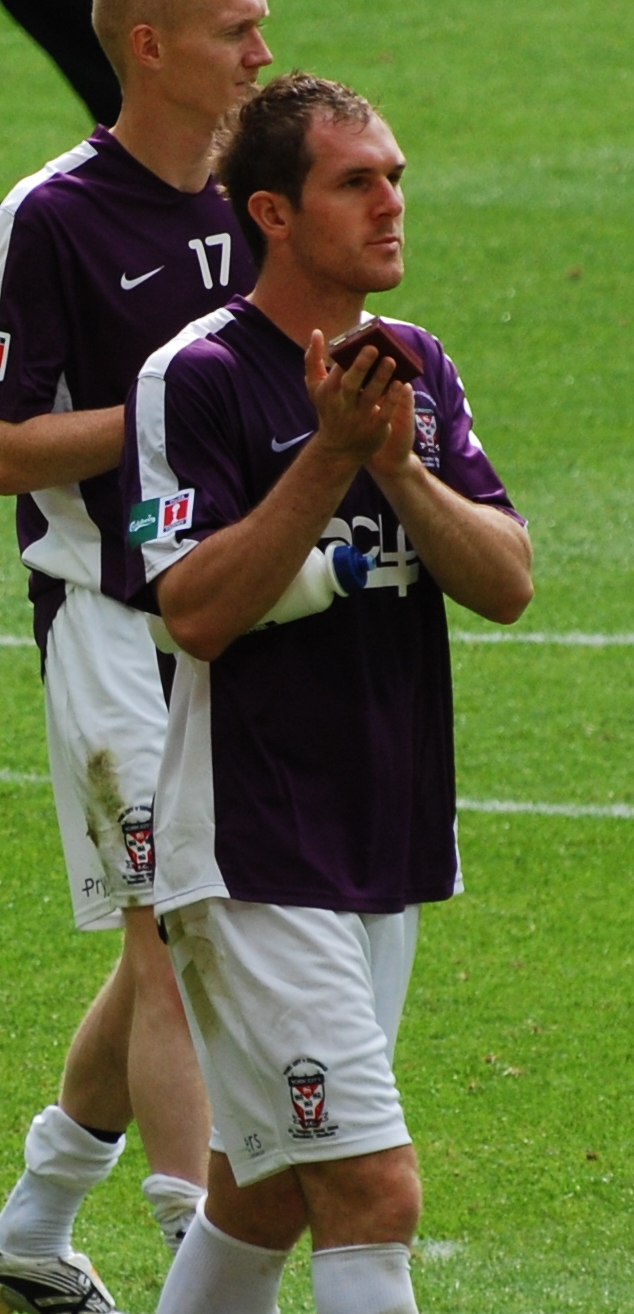
Pejic after playing for York City in the 2009 FA Trophy Final

Pejic went on trial at Conference Premier club York City in February 2009, playing in a reserve-team match against Grimsby Town. On 20 February 2009, he signed for the club on a contract until the end of 2008–09. His debut came in a 2–0 victory over Havant & Waterlooville in the fourth round of the FA Trophy on 21 February 2009. There were teams in the United States interested in signing Pejic at the end of the season, but he said "I'm keeping my options open and anything could happen yet." He started in the 2009 FA Trophy Final at Wembley Stadium on 9 May 2009, which York lost 2–0 to Stevenage Borough. Following the end of the season, during which he made 19 appearances for York, he entered negotiations with the club over a new contract.

He was eventually released by York and he was approached by clubs in Greece and the United States, before signing for USL First Division club Vancouver Whitecaps on 12 August 2009 for the rest of the 2009 season, with an option to play for the 2010 season. He joined USSF Division 2 Professional League club Crystal Palace Baltimore on 9 February 2010. After the 2010 season, Palace announced that the team would be on hiatus. Pejic returned to England in the summer of 2011, and following a trial with Barrow, he signed for the Conference Premier club on a short-term contract on 1 August. He was released just a week later.

In August 2011, he joined Welsh Premier League club Bangor City but left by mutual consent in January 2012 to move to Canada.

== International career ==
Born in England, he is eligible to play for Wales through a Welsh grandmother and was called into the Wales national under-21 team for a training session in March 2002. He made his debut in a 2–1 away defeat to Finland on 6 September 2002. He gained one cap for the under-20 team (2003) and six caps for the under-21 team (2002 to 2003).

== Career statistics ==
Appearances and goals by club, season and competition
Club	Season	League			National Cup		League Cup		Other		Total	
Club	Season	Division	Apps	Goals	Apps	Goals	Apps	Goals	Apps	Goals	Apps	Goals
Wrexham	2000–01	Second Division	1	0	0	0	0	0	0	0	1	0
Wrexham	2001–02	Second Division	12	0	0	0	0	0	0	0	12	0
Wrexham	2002–03	Third Division	27	0	1	0	2	0	2 (Note: Appearance(s) in Football League Trophy)	0	32	0
Wrexham	2003–04	Second Division	21	0	0	0	1	0	1	0	23	0
Wrexham	2004–05	League One	35	0	2	0	2	0	5	1	44	1
Wrexham	2005–06	League Two	26	0	0	0	1	0	0	0	27	0
Wrexham	2006–07	League Two	33	0	3	0	1	0	0	0	37	0
Wrexham	2007–08	League Two	19	0	1	0	2	0	0	0	22	0
Wrexham	2008–09	Conference Premier	1	0	0	0	—		0	0	1	0
Wrexham	Total		175	0	7	0	9	0	8	1	199	1
York City	2008–09	Conference Premier	15	0	—		—		4 (Note: Appearances in FA Trophy)	0	19	0
Vancouver Whitecaps	2009	USL First Division	9	0	—		—		6 (Note: Appearances in USL First Division play-offs)	0	15	0
Crystal Palace Baltimore	2010	USSF Division 2 Professional League	19	2	0	0	—		—		19	2
Bangor City	2011–12	Welsh Premier League	11	1	0	0	—		—		11	1
Career total			229	3	7	0	9	0	18	1	263	4

== Honours ==
Wrexham

- Football League Trophy: 2004–05
