= Mark Evans =

Mark Evans may refer to:

== Film and television ==
- Mark Evans (actor) (born 1985), Welsh actor
- Mark Evans Austad (1917–1988), a.k.a. Mark Evans, American radio and television commentator and diplomat
- Mark Evans (TV presenter), British television presenter and veterinary surgeon

== Sports ==
- Mark Evans (footballer, born 1970), English professional footballer who played for Bradford City and Scarborough as a goalkeeper
- Mark Evans (footballer, born 1982), English professional footballer who played for Wrexham as a defender
- Mark Evans (rower) (born 1957), Canadian rower
- Mark Evans (rugby union), English rugby player
- Mark Evans (soccer) (born 1962), American soccer defender
- Mark Evans II (born 1999), American football player

== Other people ==
- Mark Evans (comedian) (born 1973), British comedian and comedy writer
- Mark Evans (musician) (born 1956), Australian bass guitar player with AC/DC and other Australian rock bands
- Mark Evans (general) (born 1953), general in the Australian Army
- Mark Evans (explorer) (born 1961), British explorer and author

== Fictional characters ==
- Mark Evans, the protagonist of the 1993 film The Good Son
- Mark Evans (Japanese: Mamoru Endō), the protagonist of association football video games and anime series Inazuma Eleven

== See also ==
- Marc Evans (born 1960), Welsh film director
- Marcus Evans (disambiguation)
