= Hector Sam =

Trinidadian footballer (born 1978)

Personal information
- Full name: Hector McLeod Sam
- Date of birth: 25 February 1978 (age 48)
- Place of birth: Mount Hope, Trinidad and Tobago
- Height: 5 ft 10 in (1.78 m)
- Position: Forward

Youth career
- 1995: Superstar Rangers

Senior career*
Years	Team	Apps	(Gls)
1996–2000	San Juan Jabloteh		
2000–2005	Wrexham	150	(35)
2005–2006	Port Vale	4	(0)
2006–2007	Walsall	42	(7)
2007–2008	Notts County	20	(1)
2009–2011	San Juan Jabloteh	?	(7)
2011–2012	St. Ann's Rangers	8	(3)
2012–2014	Central	14	(1)
2014–2015	Police FC	18	(1)
2015	Saddle Hill Hotspur	?	(18)
Total		216	(43)

International career
1999–2005	Trinidad and Tobago	20	(2)
- * Club domestic league appearances and goals

Hector McLeod Sam (born 25 February 1978) is a Trinidadian former international football striker.

He spent eight years as a professional player in the English Football League, most significantly playing a total of 176 games for Welsh club Wrexham between 2000 and 2005, helping them to league and cup success. After spending a season on the sidelines at Port Vale following a broken leg, he signed with Walsall in 2006. Following the club's relegation, he switched to Notts County before leaving the professional game in 2008. On either side of his adventures in the UK, he played for his hometown club San Juan Jabloteh.

He scored two goals in twenty appearances in a six-year international career, helping his country qualify for the 2006 FIFA World Cup.

== Club career ==
Growing up with Marvin Andrews in San Juan, Sam attended Queen's Royal College in Trinidad for a short stint, before beginning his career at Port of Spain based San Juan Jabloteh. He moved to the United Kingdom to play for Welsh club Wrexham in the summer of 2000. There, he teamed up with fellow Trini internationals Carlos Edwards and later Dennis Lawrence.

He made his Football League debut on 12 August 2000, playing a Second Division game at the Racecourse Ground against Bristol City, which finished in a 2–0 win for the visitors. Seven days later, he scored his first goal for the club during a visit to Gigg Lane; Sam scored the second goal in a 4–1 hammering of Bury. He then went on to strike five times in his next five games, putting one past Wigan Athletic, Rotherham United and Colchester United, as well as a brace past Oldham Athletic. However, he failed to score in the rest of his 16 games that season. The young international made 33 appearances in 2001–02. He scored five league goals, one each away at Wigan, Peterborough United, Cardiff City, as well as a brace upon his return to Gigg Lane. His exploits were not enough to save the club from relegation to the Third Division.

Wrexham went straight back up in 2002–03, Sam making 32 appearances and scoring another five goals. His goals came against Oxford United, Macclesfield Town, Swansea City, Hartlepool United and Carlisle United. He was transfer listed by manager Denis Smith in May 2003, despite penning a two-year deal two months previous. The 2003–04 season was one of Sam's strongest. He scored twelve times in 41 games, managing to score twice in one game on two occasions – against Blackpool and Luton Town. In January 2004 Rotherham United manager Ronnie Moore expressed an interest in signing him, though nothing came of it. In 2004–05, he again scored twelve times, though this was not enough to save Wrexham from the drop – thanks to them being deducted ten points for entering administration. His first competitive hat-trick in the English game came on 10 August at Boundary Park, as he scored all of Wrexham's goals in a 3–2 win over Oldham. He also picked up his first sending off, seeing red against Huddersfield Town on 27 November at the Galpharm Stadium, he received the red just three minutes after replacing Juan Ugarte (the sending over was later overturned upon appeal). In March 2005, he scored his seventh career goal against Oldham, though he accepted he was now a 'super-sub' at Wrexham. He scored a club record 14 goals from the bench. His twelve goals earned the club eleven points, they would have been saved if it were not for administration. He was an unused substitute in the club's 2005 Football League Trophy success. At the end of the season he signed for Port Vale, who themselves had narrowly avoided relegation.

After three appearances in August 2005 he broke his leg after a foul from Rotherham United's Shaun Barker. He had to wait until April 2006 to take to the field again. The injury limited him to just five appearances in 2005–06, and at the end of the campaign he dropped down to League Two to sign with Vale's West Midlands rivals Walsall. He made scored seven goals in a massive 47 appearances in 2006–07, as the club went up as champions. Despite this, he was let go at the end of the season. He was subsequently signed by Notts County in May 2007. County had a disappointing 2007–08, finishing just six points off relegated Mansfield Town – and eight points ahead of his old club Wrexham. He made 24 appearances before being dropped in January, scoring just two goals; one against Hereford United and the other against Histon in the FA Cup. He left the club by mutual agreement in March 2008.

Returning to his homeland, in January 2009 he re-joined old club San Juan Jabloteh, signing in time for the start of the 2009 season. Jabloteh finished the campaign as runners-up to Joe Public. A disappointing sixth-place finish followed this in 2010–11. He later joined St. Ann's Rangers and then Central, who finished fifth in 2012–13 and 2013–14 under the management of Terry Fenwick. He later played for Police FC and Saddle Hill Hotspur.

== International career ==
Sam was named as a backup player for the Trinidad and Tobago national team in the 2006 World Cup. He might have made the final cut if he was not recovering from a broken leg. He made his debut for the "Soca Warriors" in 1999. He earned a total of twenty caps in a six-year stint, scoring two goals.

=== International goals ===
Scores and results list Trinidad and Tobago's goal tally first.

#	Date	Venue	Opponent	Result	Competition
1	31 May 2003	Moi International Sports Centre, Nairobi	Kenya	1–1	Friendly
2	17 November 2004	Hasely Crawford Stadium, Trinidad and Tobago	Saint Vincent and the Grenadines	2–1	2006 FIFA World Cup qualifier

== Career statistics ==
=== Club statistics ===
Appearances and goals by club, season and competition
Club	Season	League			FA Cup		League Cup		Other		Total	
Club	Season	Division	Apps	Goals	Apps	Goals	Apps	Goals	Apps	Goals	Apps	Goals
San Juan Jabloteh	2000	TT Pro League	38	31								
Wrexham	2000–01	Second Division	20	6	1	0	1	0	1 (Note: Appearance(s) in the EFL Trophy.)	0	23	6
Wrexham	2001–02	Second Division	29	5	1	0	1	0	2	0	33	5
Wrexham	2002–03	Third Division	26	5	1	0	2	0	3	0	32	5
Wrexham	2003–04	Second Division	37	10	1	0	1	0	2	2	41	12
Wrexham	2004–05	League One	38	9	2	1	2	1	5	1	47	12
Wrexham	Total		150	35	6	1	7	1	13	3	176	40
Port Vale	2005–06	League One	4	0	0	0	1	0	0	0	5	0
Walsall	2006–07	League Two	42	7	2	0	2	0	1	0	47	7
Notts County	2007–08	League Two	20	1	2	1	1	0	1	0	24	2
Career total (Note: Statistics outside England incomplete.)			254	74	10	2	11	1	15	3	290	80

=== International statistics ===
Trinidad and Tobago national team
Year	Apps	Goals
1999	3	0
2000	7	0
2003	4	1
2004	2	1
2005	4	0
Total	20	2

== Honours ==
San Juan Jabloteh

- Trinidad and Tobago Cup: 1998, 2011
- Trinidad and Tobago League Cup: 1999

Wrexham

- Football League Third Division third-place promotion: 2002–03
- Football League Trophy: 2004–05
- FAW Premier Cup: 2001, 2003, 2004; runner-up: 2005

Walsall

- Football League Two: 2006–07
