= Darren Ferguson =

Scottish footballer and manager (born 1972)

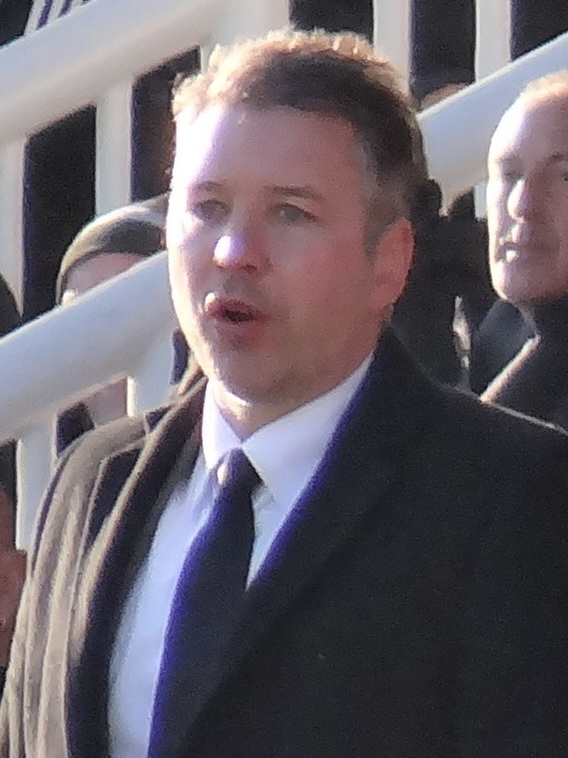
- Ferguson managing Peterborough United in 2013

Personal information
- Full name: Darren Ferguson
- Date of birth: 9 February 1972 (age 54)
- Place of birth: Glasgow, Scotland
- Height: 5 ft 10 in (1.78 m)
- Position: Midfielder

Youth career
- Manchester United

Senior career*
Years	Team	Apps	(Gls)
1990–1994	Manchester United	28	(0)
1994–1999	Wolverhampton Wanderers	117	(4)
1999	Sparta Rotterdam	14	(1)
1999–2007	Wrexham	310	(51)
2007–2008	Peterborough United	0	(0)
Total		469	(56)

International career
1992–1993	Scotland U21	5	(0)

Managerial career
- 2007–2009: Peterborough United
- 2010: Preston North End
- 2011–2015: Peterborough United
- 2015–2018: Doncaster Rovers
- 2019–2022: Peterborough United
- 2023–2025: Peterborough United
- * Club domestic league appearances and goals

Darren Ferguson (born 9 February 1972) is a Scottish professional football manager and former player, who was last the manager of EFL League One club Peterborough United, in his fourth stint as manager of the club. In between his stints with Peterborough, he also managed Preston North End and Doncaster Rovers.

As a player, Ferguson was managed at Manchester United by his father, Sir Alex Ferguson. He won a Premier League title and the FA Charity Shield in 1993 with the club before going on to spend most of his career at Wolverhampton Wanderers and Wrexham in the lower divisions of English football.

Ferguson's first managerial appointment was as player-manager of League Two Peterborough United in January 2007. After two successive promotions, and guiding the club to the second tier of English football for the first time in 17 seasons, Ferguson was relieved of his duties on 9 November 2009, with Peterborough United at the foot of The Championship.

Ferguson was appointed Preston North End manager on 6 January 2010. He was dismissed on 29 December 2010 after a string of poor results. On 12 January 2011, he was again appointed as the manager of Peterborough, where he took the club to the League One play-off final at Old Trafford, and in this match won promotion to the Football League Championship, the club's third promotion in four years, with a 3–0 victory over Huddersfield Town. Peterborough spent two seasons in the Championship after winning promotion. On 4 May 2013, Ferguson's side were relegated to League One after losing to Crystal Palace 3–2 on the final match of the season.

== Playing career ==
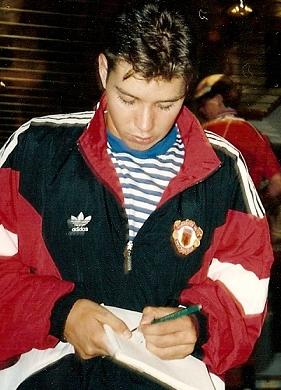
Ferguson played for Manchester United under his father, Alex, from 1990 to 1994.

Ferguson was born in Glasgow. He is the son of former Manchester United manager Sir Alex Ferguson. He has two siblings: a twin brother, Jason, and an elder brother, Mark.

His father brought him through the youth ranks at Manchester United, giving him his first team debut in 1990. Ferguson played in United's first 15 games of the new Premier League in 1992–93 during the absence of the injured Bryan Robson, and although he did not start a league game after November, he played enough games to qualify for a title winner's medal at the end of the season (which, at the time, was a minimum of 10 matches).

However, his first-team chances were very limited in 1993–94 and he was transferred to Wolverhampton Wanderers for £250,000. His final season at Old Trafford brought just five first team appearances, and with the introduction of squad numbers in the Premier League that campaign he had been issued with the number 18 shirt which would next be worn by Simon Davies.

He spent five years at Wolves, during which they qualified for the Division One play-offs twice and finished in the top 10 on four occasions, but never gained promotion to the Premier League. He left Wolves in 1999 to sign for Dutch side Sparta Rotterdam, but only made 14 appearances.

Between 1999 and 2007 he played for Wrexham making 310 appearances, scoring 51 goals. Ferguson captained them to win promotion to Division Two in 2002–03. He also led the club to its first national trophy (in English football), the Football League Trophy, scoring the second goal himself in a 2–0 win over Southend United in 2004–05.

== Managerial career ==
In 2001, 29-year-old Ferguson was linked with the management post at Wrexham, following the departure of Brian Flynn. At the time, he assisted caretaker manager Joey Jones. After manager Denis Smith was sacked in January 2007, Ferguson was again touted as a candidate, having by now played well over 300 games for the club, but coach Brian Carey was appointed instead.

There were suggestions that Ferguson and Carey had clashed, as Ferguson had expected to be appointed. Carey, who had left Ferguson on the substitutes bench for his first game, denied this. The pair had argued a year previously, following a defeat to Leyton Orient. Ferguson later stated he was disappointed not to be considered for the management position, and stated the club would have done better under him than they did under Carey.

=== Peterborough United ===
Shortly after his father celebrated 20 years as manager of Manchester United, Ferguson followed him into football management. In January 2007 he left Wrexham to become player-manager of fellow League Two side Peterborough United. Previous manager Keith Alexander had been sacked after a run of six straight defeats. He led the club to a 10th-placed finish in his first season of management. In his first full season of management, he took Posh to second place in League Two, gaining promotion. He was named League Two manager of the month for March 2008, after Peterborough won six games out of eight in the month.

In his second full season, 2008–09, he led Posh go to second place and automatic promotion to the Championship. He also won the League One Manager of the Month award for March 2009, following six straight wins. Ferguson left Peterborough in November 2009, by mutual consent, with the club bottom of the table.

=== Preston North End ===
In January 2010, Ferguson signed as manager of Preston North End. His first game at home as a manager was an FA Cup match against Chelsea on 23 January 2010 which his side lost 2–0. On 14 September 2010, Ferguson was charged with misconduct by the FA after his behaviour in the tunnel towards the referee after a 4–3 Championship defeat by Burnley.

During a disappointing period as manager of Preston, in a spell which lasted less than a year, Ferguson had a comeback win in September 2010 when his Preston side beat Leeds United 6–4 after being 4–1 down at Elland Road. After the match Ferguson said: "I have never been involved in such an amazing game."

After 49 games in charge, winning 13, drawing 12 and losing 24 games, he was sacked as manager on 29 December 2010, with Preston North End bottom of the Championship.

Following his sacking by Preston, his father Sir Alex Ferguson immediately recalled all three Manchester United players on loan at Preston; Joshua King, Ritchie De Laet, and Matty James. In addition, the Stoke City manager Tony Pulis recalled the two Stoke players on loan at Preston; Danny Pugh and Michael Tonge. This meant that in a single week, Preston had lost five key first-team players, effectively sealing the team's relegation.

=== Return to Peterborough United ===
In January 2011, Gary Johnson left his job as manager at Peterborough United, with the club several points adrift of the playoff places. On 12 January 2011, Ferguson was re-appointed as manager at Peterborough on a four-and-a-half-year contract. His first match ended up in a defeat away to league leaders Brighton & Hove Albion, but the following week, in his first game at London Road since his return, Peterborough beat Hartlepool United 4–0.

The club ultimately finished fourth in League One, and after beating Milton Keynes Dons 4–3 on aggregate, reached the play-off final at Old Trafford against Huddersfield Town. Peterborough went on to defeat Huddersfield 3–0 to clinch a return to the Championship, just one year after they had been relegated. By the end of the season, Peterborough had become the top-scoring side in the whole country, with 106 goals in total.

Peterborough spent two seasons in the Championship after winning promotion, before being relegated back to League One after losing to Crystal Palace 3–2 on the final day of the season. Peterborough had led the match with seven minutes remaining, but went on to lose in the final minute; a draw would have been enough to keep Peterborough in the Championship. Their total of 54 points during that season is to date the highest amount accrued by a relegated side in Championship history. On 21 February 2015, following a 3–0 away defeat at Milton Keynes Dons which left the team 15th in the League One table, Ferguson left Peterborough United by mutual consent.

=== Doncaster Rovers ===
Ferguson was appointed manager of League One club Doncaster Rovers on 16 October 2015. They were relegated at the end of the 2015–16 season, but a third-place finish in their only season in League Two saw the club win promotion back to League One in May 2017. Ferguson resigned from his role as manager on 4 June 2018, after guiding Rovers to 15th-placed finish in their first season back in League One.

=== Second return to Peterborough United ===
Ferguson was appointed as manager of League One club Peterborough United on 26 January 2019 for the third time with a deal agreed until the end of season after the dismissal of Steve Evans, with Gavin Strachan as his assistant. In May 2021, after missing out on the previous season's play-offs due to the season being curtailed by the COVID-19 pandemic, Ferguson successfully guided Peterborough to promotion to the Championship.

On 20 February 2022, the following day from a last-minute 1–0 defeat to relegation rivals Derby County that left Peterborough in 23rd position, five points from safety, it was announced that Ferguson had resigned during a phone call to joint-owner Darragh MacAnthony.

=== Third return to Peterborough United ===
On 4 January 2023, after the dismissal of Grant McCann with Cliff Byrne as his assistant, Ferguson returned for his fourth stint as manager to Peterborough United on a contract until the end of the season with the club sitting in eighth position in League One. They ended in sixth, and a place in the play-offs. In the play-off semi-final, Peterborough were defeated on penalties by Sheffield Wednesday despite winning the first leg 4–0. At the end of the 2022–23 season, Ferguson signed a new three-year contract.

In the 2023–24 season, Ferguson won his second EFL Trophy title, defeating Wycombe Wanderers in the final at Wembley. In the league, Peterborough finished fourth but lost the League One play-off semi-final to Oxford United.

In the 2024–25 season, Peterborough failed to get promotion, but they became the first team to retain the EFL Trophy, beating Birmingham City in the final.

On 25 October 2025, Ferguson was sacked following a 2–1 home defeat to Blackpool that left the Posh bottom of the league with just ten points from thirteen matches.

== Personal life ==
In June 2003, Ferguson married Nadine Metcalfe.

On 23 October 2007, he was arrested on suspicion of assaulting his estranged wife on the driveway of his father's home in Wilmslow, Cheshire. He was released on bail. He appeared at Macclesfield Magistrates' Court on 23 January 2008, and was charged with common assault, to which he pleaded not guilty. On 10 April 2008, he changed his plea to guilty and was fined £1,500 and ordered to pay £200 in court costs.

== Managerial statistics ==
As of match played 25 October 2025

Managerial record by team and tenure
Team	From	To	Record					Ref.
Team	From	To	P	W	D	L	Win %	Ref.
Peterborough United	20 January 2007	9 November 2009	145	73	32	40	50.34	
Preston North End	6 January 2010	29 December 2010	49	13	11	25	26.53	
Peterborough United	12 January 2011	21 February 2015	222	88	41	93	39.64	
Doncaster Rovers	16 October 2015	4 June 2018	145	55	41	49	37.93	
Peterborough United	26 January 2019	20 February 2022	150	66	30	54	44.00	
Peterborough United	4 January 2023	25 October 2025	161	73	32	56	45.34	
Total			872	368	187	317	42.20	—

== Honours ==
=== As a player ===
Manchester United

- Premier League: 1992–93
- FA Charity Shield: 1993

Wrexham

- FAW Premier Cup: 1999–2000, 2000–01, 2002–03, 2003–04; runner-up: 2004–05, 2005–06
- Football League Trophy: 2004–05

=== As a manager ===
Peterborough United

- Football League Trophy / EFL Trophy: 2013–14, 2023–24, 2024–25
- Football League One / EFL League One second-place promotion: 2008–09, 2020–21
- Football League One play-offs: 2011
- Football League Two second-place promotion: 2007–08

Doncaster Rovers

- EFL League Two third-place promotion: 2016–17

Individual

- LMA Manager of the Year: 2009 League One
- Football League One / EFL League One Manager of the Month: March 2009, February 2011, April 2014, August 2014, October 2019, October 2020, February 2021
- Football League Two / EFL League Two Manager of the Month: March 2008, January 2017
- EFL Manager of the Season: 2016–17
