= Paul Whitfield =

Welsh footballer

Personal information
- Date of birth: 6 May 1982 (age 44)
- Place of birth: St. Asaph, Wales
- Height: 1.83 m (6 ft 0 in)
- Position: Goalkeeper

Youth career
- –2000: Wrexham

Senior career*
Years	Team	Apps	(Gls)
2000–2004	Wrexham	11	(0)
2000	→ The New Saints (loan)		
2001	→ Connah's Quay Nomads (loan)		
2002	→ Newtown (loan)		
2004	Bangor City		
2004	Buckley Town		
2004–2005	Airbus UK		
2005–2007	Rhyl		
2007–2008	Cammell Laird		
- Llangefni Town
2009–2012	Llandudno		
2013–	Rhyl		
- Caernarfon Town
- Llandudno Albion
2021–2022	Llandudno		

International career
2001–2003	Wales U21	1	(0)
- * Club domestic league appearances and goals

Paul Whitfield (born 6 May 1982) is a Welsh footballer who played as a goalkeeper. He made appearances in the English Football League with Wrexham, and was part of their promotion-winning 2002–03 season from the Football League Third Division. He is now goalkeeping coach for the under-18 and under-23 teams at Swansea City.

== Career ==
Whitfield started at Wrexham, coming through the youth team. His run with the team however was plagued by injury, needing an operation for a cartilage in his right leg from an injury sustained in the warm-up for a game against Kidderminster Harriers.

During his time with club he spent time on loan at The New Saints during the 2000–01 season and travelled with the club to Estonia for a Uefa Champions League match against FC Levadia Tallinn. He also spent additional loan spells at both Connah's Quay Nomads and Newtown.

Whilst at Wrexham, Whitfield would earn a Wales under-21 cap against Azerbaijan. He was named as an unused substitute for another eight Wales under-21 games between 2001 and 2003.

After leaving Wrexham in 2004, Whitfield would play for various clubs in the Welsh Premier League including Bangor City, Airbus UK and Rhyl. He also played for Buckley Town. For the 2007–08 season he moved to Cammell Laird where he helped them win promotion to the Unibond Premier League. He returned to Wales playing for Llangefni Town and hometown club Llandudno, where in the first season he won the Welsh League Cup in the first season and narrowly missed out on promotion to the Welsh Premier League. In 2013 he re-joined former club Rhyl and later played for Caernarfon Town and Llandudno Albion, helping them reach the FAW Trophy final in the 2019–20 season, although the final was not played due to the Coronavirus pandemic. During the early part of the 2021–22 season he again played for Llandudno, playing the full-game in a Welsh Cup match against Llay Welfare.

== Coaching ==
Whitfield now works as a coach, having been named goalkeeping coach at Prestatyn Town in August 2017 and having been head coach at Rhyl FC's Academy. He has also worked with the Welsh FA's Under-19's Women's National team and been goalkeeping coach at The New Saints. He returned to Llandudno FC as goalkeeping coach in June 2020 and stayed with the club until January 2022.

Between November 2020 and January 2022 he was also an goalkeeping coach at Liverpool's academy. In January 2022 he joined Swansea City's coaching staff as a full-time goalkeeping coach for their under-18 and under-23 teams.

== Personal life ==
Whitfield is an Everton fan.

== Career statistics ==
Appearances and goals by club, season and competition
Club	Season	League			FA Cup		League Cup		Other		Total	
Club	Season	Division	Apps	Goals	Apps	Goals	Apps	Goals	Apps	Goals	Apps	Goals
Wrexham	2000–01	Second Division	0	0	0	0	0	0	0	0	0	0
Wrexham	2001–02	Second Division	0	0	0	0	0	0	0	0	0	0
Wrexham	2002–03	Third Division	8	0	1	0	1	0	3	0	13	0
Wrexham	2003–04	Second Division	3	0	0	0	0	0	2	0	5	0
Wrexham	Total		11	0	1	0	1	0	5	0	18	0
