= Shaun Holmes =

Northern Irish footballer

Personal information
- Date of birth: 27 December 1981 (age 44)
- Place of birth: Derry, Northern Ireland
- Position: Left back

Youth career
- 1997–1999: Manchester City

Senior career*
Years	Team	Apps	(Gls)
1999–2001	Manchester City	0	(0)
2001–2004	Wrexham	83	(2)
2004–2006	Glentoran		
2006	Derry City		
2007–2008	Finn Harps		
2009	Sligo Rovers	12	(1)
2009–2010	Institute	35	(0)

International career
- Northern Ireland U18
2000–2001	Northern Ireland U21	13	
2002	Northern Ireland	1	(0)
2003	Northern Ireland B	1	(0)
- * Club domestic league appearances and goals

Shaun Holmes (born 27 December 1980) is a Northern Irish footballer.

== Career ==
He had previously played for Derry City in the League of Ireland but was released by the club on 14 December 2006, as he was not seen as being a fundamental part of Pat Fenlon's (the new team-manager) plans. Paul Hegarty, the new manager at Finn Harps club acted quickly to snap up the free agent with whom he had worked at Derry City. Signed by Derry from Glentoran, he can operate in both a defensive and midfield role on the left side of the field.

Holmes, also formerly of Manchester City and Wrexham. On 17 August 2009 Institute signed the defender, who was recently released by Sligo Rovers.

== International career ==
Holmes has been capped by Northern Ireland at both full and under-21 levels. He won his first international cap in the 2002 World Cup Qualifiers.

== Honours ==
- FAW Premier Cup: 2
  - Wrexham - 2002-03, 2003-04
- Irish Premier League: 1
  - Glentoran - 2004-05
- Irish League Cup: 1
  - Glentoran - 2004-05
