= Marcus Evans (disambiguation) =

Marcus Evans is an English businessman, former chairman of Ipswich Town FC.

Marcus Evans may also refer to:

- Marcus C. Evans Jr., American politician
- Marcus Evans (basketball) (born 1996), American basketball player
- Marcus Evans (footballer) (1878–1955), Australian footballer
- Marcus S. Evans, American major-general
- Marcus Evans, British psychologist, former member of the Tavistock Clinic governance board - see NHS Gender Identity Development Service#Recent history

== See also ==
- Mark Evans (disambiguation)
