= Phillip Palethorpe =

English footballer (born 1986)

Philip Palethorpe
Personal information
- Date of birth: 17 September 1986 (age 40)
- Place of birth: Wirral, England
- Position: Goalkeeper

Team information
- Current team: Heswall (Goalkeeping Coach)

Youth career
- 2003–2006: Tranmere Rovers

Senior career*
Years	Team	Apps	(Gls)
2006–2008	Chester City	1	(0)
2007–2008	→ Tamworth (loan)	13	(0)
2008	Tranmere Rovers	0	(0)
2008–2010	Airbus UK Broughton	27	(0)
2010– 2011	Cammell Laird	0	(0)
- * Club domestic league appearances and goals as of 23 June 2009

Philip John Palethorpe (born 17 September 1986, in Wirral) is an English former professional footballer who is currently goalkeeping coach for Heswall. He previously had two spells at Tranmere Rovers and made a professional appearance for Chester City.

== Career ==
Palethorpe joined Chester from Tranmere early in 2006–07, having spent several years at Prenton Park without making a first–team appearance. He spent his first season with Chester as second–choice to ever–present goalkeeper John Danby, and then became third choice at the start of 2007–08 when Gavin Ward joined the club.

In November 2007, Palethorpe joined Tamworth in a two-month loan deal, allowing him to gain first–team experience in the Conference North. He returned to Chester two months later when Ward moved on to Wrexham and Palethorpe again became cover for Danby, finally making his Football League debut as a substitute when Danby was injured against Darlington on 22 March 2008. This proved to be his only appearance for the club, as he was released at the end of the season.

At the start of the following season, Palethorpe made a surprise return to Tranmere Rovers on a non-contract basis as emergency cover. By the end of August he had left and signed with Welsh club Airbus UK Broughton. He made 27 league appearances for the side before losing his place the following year to Kristian Rogers, eventually leading him to leave the club in January 2010 to sign for Cammell Laird.

Upon his departure from Cammell Laird, Palethorpe played for a number of amateur sides in Merseyside - including Matrix FC, Poulton Victoria & Wirral Radio FC. In 2022, he joined the coaching staff at Heswall F.C.
