= Gold Omotayo =

Swiss footballer and MMA fighter

Personal information
- Full name: Gold Ire Omotayo Agbomoagan
- Date of birth: 27 January 1994 (age 32)
- Place of birth: Zürich, Switzerland
- Position: Striker

Team information
- Current team: Eastbourne Borough
- Number: 9

Senior career*
Years	Team	Apps	(Gls)
2012–2014	FC Zürich	0	(0)
2014–2017	FC Schlieren		
2017	FC Wettswil-Bonstetten		
2017–2018	Whitehawk	16	(9)
2018–2019	Bury	13	(1)
2018	→ Maidstone United (loan)	5	(1)
2019–2020	Yeovil Town	14	(2)
2020	FC Halifax Town	4	(0)
2021	Gloucester City	1	(1)
2021	Wrexham	11	(3)
2021–2023	King's Lynn Town	79	(31)
2023	AFC Fylde	17	(3)
2023–2024	Kidderminster Harriers	18	(3)
2024–2026	King's Lynn Town	55	(13)
2026–	Eastbourne Borough	12	(0)
- * Club domestic league appearances and goals as of 23:03, 21 November 2026 (UTC)

Gold Ire Omotayo Agbomoagan (born 27 January 1994) is a Swiss professional footballer who plays as a striker for Isthmian League Premier Division club Eastbourne Borough. He has also competed in mixed martial arts.

== Career ==
Omotayo began his career in the youth team at FC Zürich as a goalkeeper, before dropping to regional football to play for FC Schlieren. In summer 2016, he moved to Wettswil-Bonstetten in the 1. Liga. He then moved to English non-league club Whitehawk in December 2017, signing a contract with the club in January 2018 after impressing in his first four games.

After scoring nine league goals in the second half of the 2017–18 season, Omotayo turned professional with Bury in July 2018, scoring the only goal of the game on his English Football League debut against Yeovil Town on 4 August 2018. On 5 October 2018, Bury loaned him to Maidstone United on a 35-day deal. Omotayo's first appearance after returning to Bury was as a substitute in the EFL Trophy match against Mansfield Town on 4 December 2018; Bury won 1–0.

On 25 August 2019, Omotayo signed for National League side Yeovil Town on a contract until the end of the 2019–20 season.

Omotayo signed for FC Halifax Town on a short-term deal on 3 October 2020, making his debut later that day. He left the club on 29 October 2020, having made five appearances in all competitions without scoring.

On 5 February 2021, Omotayo signed for National League North side Gloucester City after impressing on trial. He appeared in the only game between him signing for the club and the early curtailment of the season, a 1–1 draw against Chorley in which he scored a debut goal.

On 10 April 2021, Omotayo joined Wrexham on a non-contract basis, one of three signings for the club that day including Gloucester teammate Keanu Marsh-Brown.

After leaving Wrexham he signed for King's Lynn Town on 5 July 2021. He was named in the National League North Team of the Year for the 2022–23 season.

In June 2023, Omotayo signed for AFC Fylde on a two-year deal, the club that had beaten King's Lynn to the title in the previous season.

On 8 December 2023, Omotayo signed for divisional rivals Kidderminster Harriers on a contract until the end of the 2024–25 season, joining for an undisclosed fee.

In July 2024, Omotayo returned to National League North side King's Lynn Town.

In January 2026, Omotayo joined National League South side Eastbourne Borough.

== Personal life ==
Born in Switzerland, Omotayo is of Nigerian descent.

== Career statistics ==
As of match played 21 November 2026

Appearances and goals by club, season and competition
Club	Season	League			National Cup		League Cup		Other		Total	
Club	Season	Division	Apps	Goals	Apps	Goals	Apps	Goals	Apps	Goals	Apps	Goals
Whitehawk	2017–18	National League South	16	9	0	0	—		0	0	16	9
Bury	2018–19	League Two	13	1	0	0	1	0	3 (Note: Appearance(s) in EFL Trophy)	0	17	1
Maidstone United (loan)	2018–19	National League	5	1	0	0	—		0	0	5	1
Yeovil Town	2019–20	National League	14	2	2	0	—		1 (Note: Appearance(s) in FA Trophy)	0	17	2
FC Halifax Town	2020–21	National League	4	0	1	0	—		0	0	5	0
Gloucester City	2020–21	National League North	1	1	—		—		0	0	1	1
Wrexham	2020–21	National League	11	3	—		—		—		11	3
King's Lynn Town	2021–22	National League	38	10	2	1	—		2	0	42	11
King's Lynn Town	2022–23	National League North	40	21	6	4	—		2 (Note: One appearance in FA Trophy and one in National League North play-offs)	0	48	25
King's Lynn Town	Total		78	31	8	5	—		4	0	90	36
AFC Fylde	2023–24	National League	17	3	2	0	—		—		19	3
Kidderminster Harriers	2023–24	National League	18	3	—		—		3	0	21	3
King's Lynn Town	2024–25	National League North	36	10	4	0	—		1 (Note: Appearance(s) in National League North play-offs)	0	41	10
King's Lynn Town	2025–26	National League North	19	3	3	2	—		1	1	23	6
King's Lynn Town	Total		55	13	7	2	—		2	1	64	16
Eastbourne Borough	2025–26	National League South	6	0	0	0	—		1 (Note: Appearance(s) in Sussex Senior Cup)	0	7	0
Eastbourne Borough	2026–27	IL Premier Division	6	0	3	1	—		3 (Note: One appearance in FA Trophy, two appearances and three goal in Sussex Senior Cup)	3	12	4
Eastbourne Borough	Total		12	0	3	1	—		4	3	19	4
Career total			244	67	23	8	1	0	17	4	285	79

== Honours ==
Bury

- EFL League Two runner-up: 2018–19

Individual

- National League North Team of the Season: 2022–23

== Mixed martial arts ==
Omotayo had one mixed martial arts fight in September 2012.
