= Mark Evans (rugby union) =

English rugby union player

Mark Evans is a professional Rugby Union player who plays for Moseley Rugby Football Club. Currently Mark plays for Old Halesownians in National League 3. He has also represented the North Midlands, and in 2008 was selected for the England Counties squad to tour North America. When he is not playing he is a teacher at King Edwards Five Ways Secondary School.
