= 2020–21 Wrexham A.F.C. season =

Welsh football club season

Wrexham A.F.C.
2020–21 season
- Manager: Dean Keates
- Stadium: Racecourse Ground
- National League: 8th
- FA Cup: Fourth qualifying round
- FA Trophy: Third round proper
- Top goalscorer: Luke Young (11)
- Biggest win: 4-0 (vs Woking (A) on 17 April 2021, National League)
- Biggest defeat: 0-4 (vs Solihull Moors (A) on 24 October 2020, FA Cup)

The 2020–21 season of Wrexham A.F.C. was the football club's 156th season.

The season saw Ryan Reynolds and Rob McElhenney take over the club in November 2020, with the takeover being completed on 9 February 2021; the tail end of the season is documented in the first two episodes of the FX docu-series Welcome to Wrexham.

== First team squad ==
As of 30 June 2021

No.	Name	Nat.	Pos.	Date of birth (Age)	Signed from	Signed in
Goalkeepers
1	Rob Lainton	(England)	GK	12 October 1989 (aged 31)	(England) Port Vale	2018
21	Christian Dibble	(Wales)	GK	11 May 1994 (aged 27)	(England) Nuneaton Borough	2017
Defenders
2	Reece Hall-Johnson	(Jamaica)	DF	9 May 1995 (aged 26)	(England) Northampton Town	2020
3	Jamie Reckord	(England)	DF	9 March 1992 (aged 29)	(England) Solihull Moors	2020
4	Theo Vassell	(England)	DF	2 January 1997 (aged 24)	(England) Macclesfield Town	2020
5	Shaun Pearson	(England)	DF	28 April 1989 (aged 32)	(England) Grimsby Town	2017
16	Cameron Green	(England)	DF	24 April 1999 (aged 22)	Free agent	2021
22	Fiacre Kelleher	(Republic of Ireland)	DF	10 March 1996 (aged 25)	(England) Macclesfield Town	2020
26	Tyler French	(England)	DF	12 February 1999 (aged 22)	(England) Bradford City	2021
32	Max Cleworth	(England)	DF	9 August 2002 (aged 18)	Academy	2020
Midfielders
6	Jay Harris	(England)	MF	15 April 1987 (aged 34)	(England) Macclesfield Town	2020
8	Luke Young (captain)	(England)	MF	22 February 1993 (aged 28)	(England) Torquay United	2018
10	Devonte Redmond	(England)	MF	19 September 1996 (aged 24)	(England) Salford City	2019
12	Dan Jarvis	(England)	MF	17 January 1998 (aged 23)	Academy	2020
13	Mark Carrington	(England)	MF	15 April 1987 (aged 34)	(England) Bury	2013
14	Paul Rutherford	(England)	MF	10 July 1987 (aged 33)	(England) Southport	2016
15	James Horsfield	(England)	MF	21 September 1995 (aged 25)	(England) Scunthorpe United	2020
19	Keanu Marsh-Brown	(England) (Guyana)	MF	10 August 1992 (aged 28)	(England) Gloucester City	2021
25	Ryan Austin	(Wales)	MF	10 October 2002 (aged 18)	Academy	2020
29	Jordan Davies	(Wales)	MF	18 October 1998 (aged 22)	(England) Brighton & Hove Albion	2020
Forwards
9	Jordan Ponticelli	(England)	FW	10 September 1998 (aged 22)	(England) Coventry City	2020
11	Gold Omotayo	(Switzerland)	FW	27 January 1994 (aged 27)	(England) Gloucester City	2021
18	Chris Sang	(England)	FW	29 June 1999 (aged 22)	(England) Marshalls FC	2021
20	Dior Angus	(England)	FW	18 January 1994 (aged 27)	(England) Barrow	2021
27	Jake Bickerstaff	(England)	FW	11 September 2001 (aged 19)	Academy	2020
39	Kwame Thomas	(England)	FW	28 September 1995 (aged 25)	(England) Burton Albion	2020

== Transfers ==
=== In ===
Date	Pos.	Nat.	Name	From	Fee	Ref.
14 August 2020	DF	(England)	Jamie Reckord	(England) Solihull Moors	Free	
16 August 2020	MF	(England)	Elliott Durrell	(England) Altrincham	Free	
19 August 2020	FW	(England)	Jake Bickerstaff	Academy	Free	
19 August 2020	DF	(England)	Max Cleworth	Academy	Free	
19 August 2020	FW	(England)	Jordan Ponticelli	(England) Coventry City	Free	
24 August 2020	DF	(England)	Reece Hall-Johnson	(England) Northampton Town	Free	
25 August 2020	MF	(Wales)	Jordan Davies	(England) Brighton & Hove Albion	Free	
27 August 2020	DF	(England)	Theo Vassell	(England) Macclesfield Town	Free	
29 August 2020	FW	(England)	Kwame Thomas	(England) Burton Albion	Free	
10 September 2020	MF	(Guyana)	Anthony Jeffrey	(England) Dover Athletic	Free	
12 September 2020	DF	(Republic of Ireland)	Fiacre Kelleher	(England) Macclesfield Town	Free	
15 September 2020	MF	(England)	James Horsfield	(England) Scunthorpe United	Free	
1 February 2021	FW	(England)	Dior Angus	(England) Barrow	Free	
1 February 2021	DF	(England)	Tyler French	(England) Bradford City	Free	
10 April 2021	MF	(England)	Keanu Marsh-Brown	(England) Gloucester City	Free	
10 April 2021	FW	(Switzerland)	Gold Omotayo	(England) Gloucester City	Free	
10 April 2021	FW	(England)	Chris Sang	(England) Marshalls FC	Free	
12 April 2021	DF	(England)	Cameron Green	Free agent	Free	

=== Loaned in ===
Date	Pos.	Nat.	Name	From	Date until	Ref.
28 August 2020	FW	(Tanzania)	Adi Yussuf	(England) Blackpool	End of season	

=== Loaned out ===
Date	Pos.	Nat.	Name	To	Date until	Ref.
10 August 2020	FW	(England)	Bobby Grant	(England) Oldham Athletic	End of season	
31 January 2021	GK	(Poland)	Dawid Szczepaniak	(Wales) Cefn Druids	End of season	
1 February 2021	FW	(England)	Jake Bickerstaff	(Wales) Caernarfon Town	End of season	
1 February 2021	DF	(England)	Max Cleworth	(Wales) Caernarfon Town	End of season	

=== Released ===
Date	Pos.	Nat.	Name	Subsequent club	Join date	Ref.
30 June 2020	DF	(England)	Jazzi Barnum-Bobb	(England) Dartford	16 August 2020	
30 June 2020	FW	(England)	JJ Hooper	(England) Barnet	11 September 2020	
30 June 2020	MF	(England)	Davis Keillor-Dunn	(England) Oldham Athletic	11 August 2020	
30 June 2020	DF	(England)	James Jennings	(England) Stockport County	16 July 2020	
30 June 2020	DF	(England)	Jake Lawlor	(England) Harrogate Town	12 August 2020	
30 June 2020	FW	(Scotland)	Leighton McIntosh	(Scotland) Cove Rangers	10 August 2020	
30 June 2020	FW	(England)	Jason Oswell	(England) Telford United	1 July 2020	
30 June 2020	MF	(Wales)	Matt Sargent	(England) Salford City	29 August 2020	
30 June 2020	MF	(England)	Luke Summerfield	(England) FC Halifax Town	20 August 2020	
30 June 2020	DF	(England)	Doug Tharme	(England) Curzon Ashton	5 August 2020	
30 June 2020	MF	(England)	Jack Thorn	(Wales) Aberystwyth Town	25 September 2020	
30 June 2020	DF	(England)	Akil Wright	(England) York City	17 September 2020	
27 January 2021	MF	(Guyana)	Anthony Jeffrey	(England) Billericay Town	1 February 2022	
14 April 2021	MF	(England)	Elliott Durrell	(England) Telford United	29 June 2021	

== Competitions ==
=== Overall record ===
Competition	First match	Last match	Starting round	Final position	Record							
Competition	First match	Last match	Starting round	Final position	Pld	W	D	L	GF	GA	GD	Win %
National League	6 October 2020	29 May 2021	Matchday 1	8th	42	19	11	12	64	43	+21	45.24
FA Cup	24 October 2020	24 October 2020	Fourth qualifying round	Fourth qualifying round	1	0	0	1	0	4	−4	0.00
FA Trophy	9 December 2020	9 December 2020	Third round proper	Third round proper	1	0	0	1	0	0	+0	0.00
Total					44	19	11	14	64	47	+17	43.18

Last updated: 30 June 2021
Source: Competitions

=== National League ===
==== League table ====
Pos	Team	Pld	W	D	L	GF	GA	GD	Pts	Promotion, qualification or relegation
6	Chesterfield	42	21	6	15	60	43	+17	69	Qualification for the National League play-off quarter-finals
7	Bromley	42	19	12	11	63	53	+10	69	Qualification for the National League play-off quarter-finals
8	Wrexham	42	19	11	12	64	43	+21	68	
9	Eastleigh	42	18	12	12	49	40	+9	66	
10	FC Halifax Town	42	19	8	15	63	54	+9	65	

Source: National League official site
Rules for classification: 1) Points; 2) Goal difference; 3) Number of goals scored; 4) Number of matches won; 5) Head-to-head results

==== Matches ====
6 October 2020 1	Solihull Moors	1–0	Wrexham
19:00 BST		Report

10 October 2020 2	Yeovil Town	0–1	Wrexham
15:00 BST		Report

12 October 2020 3	Wrexham	0–1	Maidenhead
19:00 BST		Report

17 October 2020 4	Wealdstone	4–3	Wrexham
15:00 BST		Report

27 October 2020 5	Wrexham	0–0	Barnet
19:00 BST		Report

17 November 2020 6	Hartlepool	0–1	Wrexham
19:00 BST		Report

21 November 2020 7	Wrexham	1–0	Aldershot
15:00 BST		Report

24 November 2020 8	Wrexham	4–0	Sutton
19:00 BST		Report

28 November 2020 9	Bromley	1–1	Wrexham
15:00 BST		Report

1 December 2020 10	Wrexham	0–1	Altrincham
19:00 BST		Report

5 December 2020 11	Torquay United	3–1	Wrexham
15:00 BST		Report

15 December 2020 12	Weymouth	2–3	Wrexham
19:00 BST		Report

28 December 2020 13	Stockport County	2–0	Wrexham
15:00 BST		Report

16 January 2021 14	Wrexham	3–1	Dover
15:00 BST		Report

23 January 2021 15	Chesterfield	2–1	Wrexham
15:00 BST		Report

26 January 2021 16	Wrexham	0–0	FC Halifax Town
19:00 BST		Report

30 January 2021 17	King's Lynn	0–2	Wrexham
15:00 BST		Report

2 February 2021 18	Eastleigh	1–1	Wrexham
19:00 BST		Report

6 February 2021 19	Wrexham	2–2	Dagenham & Redbridge
15:00 BST		Report

9 February 2021 20	Altrincham	1–2	Wrexham
19:00 BST		Report

16 February 2021 21	Wrexham	2–0	Woking
19:00 BST		Report

20 February 2021 22	Aldershot	3–0	Wrexham
15:00 BST		Report

23 February 2021 23	Wrexham	0–0	Hartlepool
19:00 BST		Report

27 February 2021 24	Wrexham	4–1	Wealdstone
15:00 BST		Report

6 March 2021 25	Sutton	0–0	Wrexham
17:00 BST		Report

9 March 2021 26	Barnet	0–2	Wrexham
19:00 BST		Report

13 March 2021 27	Wrexham	2–0	Weymouth
15:00 BST		Report

16 March 2021 28	Wrexham	2–2	Eastleigh
19:00 BST		Report

27 March 2021 29	Wrexham	3–0	Bromley
15:00 BST		Report

2 April 2021 30	Notts County	1–0	Wrexham
12:00 BST		Report

5 April 2021 31	Wrexham	0–1	Torquay United
15:00 BST		Report

10 April 2021 32	Wrexham	0–3	Stockport County
15:00 BST		Report

13 April 2021 33	FC Halifax Town	0–4	Wrexham
19:00 BST		Report

17 April 2021 34	Woking	0–4	Wrexham
12:00 BST		Report

24 April 2021 35	Wrexham	0–0	Chesterfield
15:00 BST		Report

1 May 2021 36	Wrexham	2–1	Solihull Moors
15:00 BST		Report

3 May 2021 37	Maidenhead	2–2	Wrexham
15:00 BST		Report

8 May 2021 38	Wrexham	3–0	Yeovil Town
15:00 BST		Report

15 May 2021 39	Boreham Wood	2–3	Wrexham
15:00 BST		Report

18 May 2021 40	Wrexham	0–1	Notts County
19:00 BST		Report

22 May 2021 41	Wrexham	5–3	King's Lynn
15:00 BST		Report

29 May 2021 42	Dagenham & Redbridge	1–1	Wrexham
12:00 BST		Report

=== FA Cup ===
24 October 2020 Fourth qualifying round	Solihull Moors	4–0	Wrexham
		Report

=== FA Trophy ===
9 December 2020 Third round proper	Wrexham	0–0 (5–6 p)	Leamington
		Report
