= Craig Faulconbridge =

English footballer (born 1978)

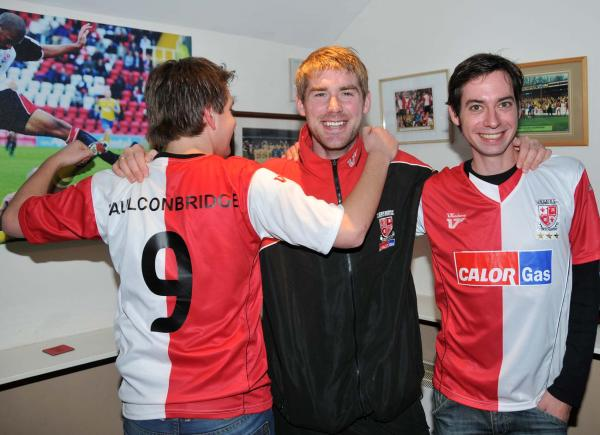
- Faulconbridge with Woking FC in 2011.

Personal information
- Full name: Craig Michael Faulconbridge
- Date of birth: 20 April 1978 (age 48)
- Place of birth: Nuneaton, England
- Height: 6 ft 1 in (1.85 m)
- Positions: Forward; defender

Youth career
- 19??–1998: Coventry City

Senior career*
Years	Team	Apps	(Gls)
1998–1999	Coventry City	0	(0)
1998	→ Dunfermline Athletic (loan)	7	(1)
1998	→ Dunfermline Athletic (loan)	6	(0)
1998–1999	→ Hull City (loan)	10	(0)
1999–2002	Wrexham	111	(31)
2002–2005	Wycombe Wanderers	58	(8)
2005–20??	Wingate & Finchley		
- Maidenhead United
20??–2009	Oxford City		
2009–2010	Carshalton Athletic		
2010–2011	Woking		
2011	→ Maidenhead United (loan)	11	(1)
2012–2013	Aylesbury	46	(6)
2013–2014	Chinnor		
2015–	Thame United		

Managerial career
- 2012–2013: Aylesbury
- Thame Rangers
- * Club domestic league appearances and goals as of 1 June 2014

Craig Michael Faulconbridge (born 20 April 1978) is an English professional footballer.

== Career ==
Born in Nuneaton, Faulconbridge played youth football with Coventry City, before playing league football for Dunfermline Athletic, Hull City, Wrexham and Wycombe Wanderers.

Faulconbridge notably scored a dramatic goal during the 1997–98 Scottish Premier Division season for Dunfermline against Celtic, a goal which denied Celtic the league championship that weekend. Celtic eventually clinched the championship, which denied Rangers a tenth successive championship, on the final day of the season by beating St Johnstone 2–0.

He later played non-league football with Wingate & Finchley, Maidenhead United, Oxford City, Carshalton Athletic and Woking, before joining Didcot Town as a player-coach in June 2011. He left in October 2011 after the resignation of Manager Francis Vines.

He signed for Aylesbury on 10 January 2012. After the conclusion of the season, Faulconbridge was confirmed as the new manager at Aylesbury, replacing Steve Smith. In June 2012, Faulconbridge confirmed his intentions to continue playing whilst managing.

Faulconbridge left Aylesbury in the autumn of 2013, replaced by former Slough Town manager Steve Bateman. He played for Chinnor during the 2014–15 season before joining Thame United, where he became a youth team coach and manager of Thame Rangers.
