= 2007–08 Football League Two =

Football League Two
- Season: 2007–08
- Promoted: Milton Keynes Dons (champions); Peterborough United (runners up); Hereford United; Stockport County (play-off winners)
- Relegated: Mansfield Town; Wrexham
- Goals: 1,427
- Average goals/game: 2.59
- Top goalscorer: Aaron McLean (29)
- Biggest home win: Peterborough United 8–2 Accrington Stanley (15 January 2008); Stockport County 6–0 Wycombe Wanderers (8 December 2007)
- Biggest away win: Bury 1–5 Milton Keynes Dons (2 February 2008)
- Highest scoring: Peterborough United 8–2 Accrington Stanley (15 January 2008)
- Longest winning run: Peterborough United (13)
- Longest unbeaten run: Milton Keynes Dons (23)
- Longest losing run: Lincoln City (11)
- Highest attendance: Milton Keynes Dons v Morecambe (17,250) (3 May 2008)
- Lowest attendance: Wrexham v Wycombe Wanderers (2,805) (7 November 2007)
- Average attendance: 4,346

The Football League 2007–08 (named Coca-Cola Football League for sponsorship reasons), was the sixteenth season under its current league division format. It began in August 2007 and concluded in May 2008, with the promotion play-off finals.

The Football League is contested through three Divisions. The third and final division of these is League Two. The winner and the runner up of League Two will be automatically promoted to the Football League One and they will be joined by the winner of the League Two playoff. The bottom four teams in the league will be relegated to the Conference.

Dagenham & Redbridge and Morecambe played at this level for the first time.

== Changes from last season ==
=== From League Two ===
Promoted to League One

- Walsall
- Hartlepool United
- Swindon Town
- Bristol Rovers

Relegated to Conference

- Boston United
- Torquay United

=== To League Two ===
Relegated from League One

- Chesterfield
- Bradford City
- Rotherham United
- Brentford

Promoted from Conference

- Dagenham & Redbridge
- Morecambe

== League table ==
Pos	Team	Pld	W	D	L	GF	GA	GD	Pts	Promotion or relegation
1	Milton Keynes Dons (C, P)	46	29	10	7	82	37	+45	97	Promotion to 2008–09 League One
2	Peterborough United (P)	46	28	8	10	84	43	+41	92	Promotion to 2008–09 League One
3	Hereford United (P)	46	26	10	10	72	41	+31	88	Promotion to 2008–09 League One
4	Stockport County (O, P)	46	24	10	12	72	54	+18	82	Qualification for League Two playoffs
5	Rochdale	46	23	11	12	77	54	+23	80	Qualification for League Two playoffs
6	Darlington	46	22	12	12	67	40	+27	78	Qualification for League Two playoffs
7	Wycombe Wanderers	46	22	12	12	56	42	+14	78	Qualification for League Two playoffs
8	Chesterfield	46	19	12	15	76	56	+20	69	
9	Rotherham United	46	21	11	14	62	58	+4	64 (Note: Rotherham United deducted 10 points for administration entrance.)	
10	Bradford City	46	17	11	18	63	61	+2	62	
11	Morecambe	46	16	12	18	59	63	−4	60	
12	Barnet	46	16	12	18	56	63	−7	60	
13	Bury	46	16	11	19	58	61	−3	59	
14	Brentford	46	17	8	21	52	70	−18	59	
15	Lincoln City	46	18	4	24	61	77	−16	58	
16	Grimsby Town	46	15	10	21	55	66	−11	55	
17	Accrington Stanley	46	16	3	27	49	83	−34	51	
18	Shrewsbury Town	46	12	14	20	56	65	−9	50	
19	Macclesfield Town	46	11	17	18	47	64	−17	50	
20	Dagenham & Redbridge	46	13	10	23	49	70	−21	49	
21	Notts County	46	10	18	18	37	53	−16	48	
22	Chester City	46	12	11	23	51	68	−17	47	
23	Mansfield Town (R)	46	11	9	26	48	68	−20	42	Relegation to 2008–09 Conference National
24	Wrexham (R)	46	10	10	26	38	70	−32	40	Relegation to 2008–09 Conference National

Updated to match(es) played on 3 May 2008. Source: The Football League
Rules for classification: 1) points; 2) goal difference; 3) number of goals scored.
(C) Champions; (O) Play-off winners; (P) Promoted; (R) Relegated

== Play-offs ==
Semifinals
4	Stockport County	1	1	2
7	Wycombe Wanderers	1	0	1
5	Rochdale	1	2(5)	3
6	Darlington	2	1(4)	3

Final
4	Stockport County	3
5	Rochdale	2

== Results ==
Home \ Away	ACC	BAR	BRA	BRE	BRY	CHE	CHF	D&R	DAR	GRI	HER	LIN	MAC	MAN	MKD	MOR	NTC	PET	ROC	ROT	SHR	STP	WRE	WYC
Accrington Stanley		0–2	0–2	1–0	0–2	3–3	2–1	1–0	0–3	4–1	0–2	0–3	3–2	1–0	0–1	3–2	0–2	0–2	1–2	0–1	1–2	0–2	0–2	0–2
Barnet	2–2		2–1	1–2	3–0	3–1	0–2	3–1	0–0	0–3	1–2	5–2	2–2	1–0	0–2	0–1	1–1	0–2	0–0	2–0	4–1	2–1	3–2	2–1
Bradford City	0–3	1–1		1–2	1–2	2–1	1–0	0–2	0–0	2–1	1–3	2–1	1–1	1–2	1–2	1–0	3–0	1–0	1–2	3–2	4–2	1–1	2–1	0–1
Brentford	3–1	2–1	2–2		1–4	3–0	2–1	2–3	0–2	0–1	0–3	1–0	1–0	1–1	0–3	0–1	0–0	1–2	0–2	1–1	1–1	1–3	2–0	1–3
Bury	2–1	3–0	2–2	1–2		0–2	0–1	0–2	1–2	1–1	0–1	1–1	1–0	2–0	1–5	2–1	2–1	2–0	1–1	3–0	1–1	2–3	0–1	2–2
Chester City	2–3	3–0	0–1	0–2	2–1		0–0	4–0	2–1	0–2	1–1	1–2	0–0	0–1	0–2	0–1	0–1	1–2	0–4	0–1	3–1	0–0	0–2	2–2
Chesterfield	4–2	0–1	1–1	1–0	3–1	1–1		1–1	1–1	1–2	4–0	4–1	2–2	2–0	1–2	2–2	1–1	1–2	3–4	0–2	4–1	1–1	2–1	2–0
Dagenham & Redbridge	1–3	1–1	1–4	1–2	1–1	6–2	0–3		0–3	0–0	1–0	1–0	0–1	2–0	0–1	2–0	1–1	2–3	1–1	0–2	1–1	0–1	3–0	2–2
Darlington	1–0	1–0	1–3	3–1	3–0	1–0	0–0	2–3		3–2	0–1	2–0	2–2	1–2	0–1	2–2	2–2	1–1	1–1	1–1	2–0	4–0	2–0	1–0
Grimsby Town	1–2	4–1	1–1	1–2	1–0	1–2	4–2	1–4	0–4		2–1	1–0	1–1	1–0	0–1	1–2	1–1	1–4	1–2	0–1	1–1	1–1	1–0	0–1
Hereford United	0–0	1–2	4–2	2–0	0–0	2–2	2–0	4–1	5–1	2–0		3–1	0–1	2–1	0–1	0–3	0–0	0–1	1–1	0–0	3–1	0–1	2–0	1–0
Lincoln City	2–0	4–1	1–2	3–1	1–1	0–1	2–4	2–0	0–4	1–2	2–1		3–1	1–2	1–2	1–1	2–1	1–1	2–1	1–3	0–4	0–1	2–4	1–0
Macclesfield Town	2–1	3–0	0–1	1–0	2–2	1–2	1–0	1–1	0–0	1–2	0–1	1–2		0–0	3–3	1–2	1–1	0–3	2–2	1–1	2–1	0–2	3–2	1–2
Mansfield Town	1–2	2–2	0–0	2–3	1–1	1–3	1–3	0–1	0–1	1–2	0–1	1–3	5–0		1–2	1–2	2–0	2–0	0–4	0–1	3–1	4–2	2–1	0–4
Milton Keynes Dons	5–0	0–1	2–1	1–1	1–2	1–0	1–2	4–0	1–0	2–0	0–0	4–0	1–1	1–0		1–1	3–0	1–1	0–1	1–1	3–0	0–2	4–1	2–2
Morecambe	0–1	0–0	2–1	3–1	2–1	5–3	1–1	1–0	0–3	0–4	0–3	1–2	0–1	3–1	0–1		1–1	3–2	1–1	5–1	1–1	2–0	2–2	0–1
Notts County	1–0	0–0	1–3	1–1	1–3	1–0	1–0	1–0	0–1	1–1	2–3	0–1	0–1	0–0	1–2	1–1		0–1	1–0	0–1	2–1	1–2	2–1	1–0
Peterborough United	8–2	1–0	2–1	7–0	1–0	1–0	2–3	3–1	0–2	2–1	1–1	4–0	0–1	2–1	1–2	1–1	0–0		3–0	3–1	2–1	0–1	0–0	2–1
Rochdale	4–1	3–0	2–1	1–1	1–2	1–2	0–1	1–0	3–1	3–1	2–4	0–2	1–1	1–0	3–2	1–0	4–2	0–2		4–1	1–1	1–2	0–0	0–1
Rotherham United	0–1	1–0	1–1	1–2	2–1	1–1	2–1	2–1	0–2	2–1	0–1	3–2	3–0	3–2	0–1	3–1	1–1	3–1	2–4		2–0	1–4	3–0	1–1
Shrewsbury Town	2–0	1–0	1–0	0–1	0–1	0–0	2–3	4–0	0–0	2–1	1–2	1–2	2–0	0–0	3–3	2–0	0–0	0–2	3–4	1–1		3–1	3–0	0–1
Stockport County	2–0	2–4	2–1	1–0	1–2	1–2	2–2	1–0	1–0	1–1	2–3	1–3	2–0	2–1	2–3	2–1	1–1	1–2	2–0	2–2	1–1		2–1	6–0
Wrexham	1–3	0–2	1–1	1–3	2–1	2–2	0–4	0–0	2–0	0–0	0–2	1–0	1–1	1–1	1–0	2–1	1–0	0–2	0–2	0–1	0–1	0–1		0–0
Wycombe Wanderers	0–1	0–0	2–1	1–0	1–0	1–0	1–0	0–1	2–0	3–0	2–2	1–0	2–1	1–2	1–1	2–0	3–1	2–2	0–1	1–0	1–1	0–0	2–1	

Source: The Football League
Legend: Blue = home team win; Yellow = draw; Red = away team win.

=== Top scorers ===
Pos	Player	Team	Goals
1	(England) Aaron McLean	Peterborough United	29
2	(England) Scott McGleish	Wycombe Wanderers	26
3	(England) Jack Lester	Chesterfield	24
4	(England) Michael Boulding	Mansfield Town	22
5	(England) Liam Dickinson	Stockport County	19
6	(England) Andy Bishop	Bury	17
7	(England) Glenn Poole	Brentford	14
7	(England) Peter Thorne	Bradford City	14
7	(England) Adam Le Fondre	Rochdale	14
7	(England) Ben Strevens	Dagenham & Redbridge	14

== Managers ==
Club	Manager
Accrington Stanley	John Coleman
Barnet	Paul Fairclough
Bradford City	Stuart McCall
Brentford	Terry Butcher
Bury	Chris Casper
Chester City	Bobby Williamson
Chesterfield	Lee Richardson
Dagenham & Redbridge	John Still
Darlington	Dave Penney
Grimsby Town	Alan Buckley
Hereford United	Graham Turner
Lincoln City	John Schofield
Macclesfield Town	Ian Brightwell
Mansfield Town	Bill Dearden
Milton Keynes Dons	Paul Ince
Morecambe	Sammy McIlroy
Notts County	Steve Thompson
Peterborough United	Darren Ferguson
Rochdale	Keith Hill
Rotherham United	Mark Robins
Shrewsbury Town	Gary Peters
Stockport County	Jim Gannon
Wrexham	Brian Carey
Wycombe Wanderers	Paul Lambert

== Stadia and locations ==
Locations of the League Two 2007–08 teams

Team	Stadium	Capacity
Darlington	The Darlington Arena	25,294
Bradford City	Valley Parade	25,136
Rotherham United	Don Valley Stadium	25,000
Milton Keynes Dons	stadium:mk	22,000
Notts County	Meadow Lane	19,588
Wrexham	Racecourse Ground	15,550
Peterborough United	London Road Stadium	15,460
Brentford	Griffin Park	12,763
Bury	Gigg Lane	11,840
Stockport County	Edgeley Park	10,651
Rochdale	Spotland Stadium	10,249
Lincoln City	Sincil Bank	10,127
Mansfield Town	Field Mill	10,000
Wycombe Wanderers	Adams Park	10,000
Shrewsbury Town	New Meadow	9,875
Grimsby Town	Blundell Park	9,106
Chesterfield	Saltergate	8,504
Hereford United	Edgar Street	7,100
Morecambe	Christie Park	6,400
Macclesfield Town	Moss Rose	6,335
Dagenham & Redbridge	Victoria Road	6,000
Barnet	Underhill Stadium	5,568
Chester	Deva Stadium	5,376
Accrington Stanley	Crown Ground	5,057

== Managerial changes ==
Team	Outgoing manager	Manner of departure	Date of vacancy	Replaced by	Date of appointment	Position in table
Lincoln City	John Schofield	Contract terminated	15 October 2007	Peter Jackson	30 October 2007	23rd
Notts County	Steve Thompson	Contract terminated	16 October 2007	Ian McParland	18 October 2007	19th
Wrexham	Brian Carey	Replaced	15 November 2007	Brian Little	15 November 2007	23rd
Brentford	Terry Butcher	Mutual consent	11 December 2007	Andy Scott	4 January 2008	19th
Bury	Chris Casper	Contract terminated	14 January 2008	Alan Knill	4 February 2008	19th
Macclesfield Town	Ian Brightwell	Mutual consent	27 February 2008	Keith Alexander	27 February 2008	22nd
Chester City	Bobby Williamson	Contract terminated	4 March 2008	Simon Davies	11 March 2008	17th
Shrewsbury Town	Gary Peters	Mutual consent	4 March 2008	Paul Simpson	12 March 2008	16th
Mansfield Town	Bill Dearden	Mutual consent	8 March 2008	Paul Holland	25 March 2008	23rd
Wycombe Wanderers	Paul Lambert	Mutual consent	20 May 2008	Peter Taylor	29 May 2008	7th
Milton Keynes Dons	Paul Ince	Mutual consent (hired by Blackburn Rovers)	22 June 2008	Roberto Di Matteo	2 July 2008	1st
