= Adrian Moody =

English footballer

Personal information
- Full name: Adrian Moody
- Date of birth: 29 September 1982 (age 44)
- Place of birth: Birkenhead, Merseyside, England
- Height: 1.83 m (6 ft 0 in)
- Position: Defender

Youth career
- Wrexham

Senior career*
Years	Team	Apps	(Gls)
1999–2002	Wrexham	4	(0)
2002–2003	Rhyl	10	(2)
2003–2006	Newtown	73	(2)
2006–2007	Rhyl	15	(1)
2009–2010	Prestatyn Town	8	(0)
- * Club domestic league appearances and goals as of 03:34, 19 February 2017 (UTC)

Adrian Moody (born 29 September 1982) is an English former footballer, who played as a defender. Whilst he mostly played in the Welsh Premier League, he made appearances in the English Football League with Wrexham.

== Career ==
After making his way up through Wrexham's Youth Team, Moody made his Wrexham debut at the age of 18 away at Reading. He would make a total of four League appearances for the club.

After leaving Wrexham, Moody would move to Welsh Premier League club Rhyl for a year, before then moving to fellow WPL club Newtown, where he spent three seasons.

In 2006, he resigned for Rhyl, spending a season there before taking a break from football. He returned in 2009 to spend a season at Prestatyn Town.
