= Waynne Phillips =

Welsh footballer

Personal information
- Full name: Waynne Phillips
- Date of birth: 15 December 1970 (age 55)
- Place of birth: Caernarfon, Wales
- Position: Midfielder

Team information
- Current team: Cefn Druids

Senior career*
Years	Team	Apps	(Gls)
1989–1998	Wrexham	207	(16)
1998	→ Stockport County (loan)	13	(0)
1998–1999	Stockport County	9	(0)
1999–2003	Wrexham	38	(2)
2003–2006	Caernarfon Town	69	(1)
2006–2010	Cefn Druids	92	(2)

Managerial career
- 2004: Caernarfon Town (caretaker)
- 2004–2006: Caernarfon Town
- 2007–2010: Cefn Druids
- * Club domestic league appearances and goals

Waynne Phillips (born 15 December 1970 in Caernarfon, Wales) is a Welsh former professional footballer who played as a midfielder for various teams in the Football League.

Phillips, a fluent Welsh speaker from Caernarfon, joined Wrexham as a YTS apprentice in 1988 making his debut for the first team when replacing Joey Jones in a Welsh Cup match against Rhyl in 1990.

== BBC Radio Cymru ==
Phillips occasionally works as a football commentator for BBC Radio Cymru.
