= 2003–04 FAW Premier Cup =

Tournament details
- Country: England; Wales
- Teams: 12

Final positions
- Champions: Wrexham
- Runners-up: Rhyl

Tournament statistics
- Matches played: 31
- Goals scored: 126 (4.06 per match)

The 2003–04 FAW Premier Cup was the seventh season of the tournament since its founding in 1997.

== Group A ==
Home	Score	Away
Total Network Solutions	3–3	Bangor City
Total Network Solutions	3–4	Caersws
Aberystwyth Town	4–1	Bangor City
Total Network Solutions	5–0	Aberystwyth Town
Caersws	1–6	Bangor City
Caersws	3–1	Aberystwyth Town
Aberystwyth Town	0–0	Total Network Solutions
Bangor City	1–3	Total Network Solutions
Aberystwyth Town	1–2	Caersws
Bangor City	5–5	Aberystwyth Town
Caersws	0–5	Total Network Solutions
Bangor City	8–1	Caersws

Team	Pld	W	D	L	GF	GA	GD	Pts
Total Network Solutions	6	3	2	1	19	8	+11	11
Caersws	6	3	0	3	11	24	−13	9
Bangor City	6	2	2	2	24	17	+7	8
Aberystwyth Town	6	1	2	3	11	16	−5	5

Source: Wales Cups 2003/04 from RSSSF

== Group B ==
Home	Score	Away
Connah's Quay Nomads	1–3	Rhyl
Rhyl	0–0	Afan Lido
Connah's Quay Nomads	1–1	Newport County
Connah's Quay Nomads	2–2	Afan Lido
Rhyl	1–0	Newport County
Newport County	2–0	Afan Lido
Rhyl	2–1	Connah's Quay Nomads
Afan Lido	2–5	Newport County
Newport County	1–1	Connah's Quay Nomads
Newport County	3–0	Rhyl
Afan Lido	0–1	Connah's Quay Nomads
Afan Lido	1–3	Rhyl

Team	Pld	W	D	L	GF	GA	GD	Pts
Rhyl	6	4	1	1	9	6	+3	13
Newport County	6	3	2	1	12	5	+7	11
Connah's Quay Nomads	6	1	3	2	7	9	−2	6
Afan Lido	6	0	2	4	5	13	−8	2

Source: Wales Cups 2003/04 from RSSSF

== Quarter finals ==
Home	Score	Away
Caersws	2–4	Swansea City
Newport County	0–1	Cardiff City
Rhyl	8–0	Barry Town
Total Network Solutions	0–2	Wrexham

== Semi finals ==
Home	Score	Away
Wrexham	2–2	Cardiff City
Rhyl	2–0	Swansea City

== Final ==
12 May 2004
19:45

Rhyl	1–4	Wrexham
Moran 75'	Report	Carey 30'; Barrett 48'; Sam 54', 63'

Belle Vue, Rhyl
