= Steve Thomas (footballer) =

Welsh footballer

Personal information
- Full name: Stephen Thomas
- Date of birth: 23 June 1979 (age 47)
- Place of birth: Hartlepool, England
- Height: 5 ft 10 in (1.78 m)
- Position: Midfielder

Youth career
- 1995-1997: Wrexham AFC Apprentice

Senior career*
Years	Team	Apps	(Gls)
1997–2004	Wrexham	146	(15)
2004–2006	Darlington	18	(0)
2006	York City	19	(1)
Total		183	(16)

International career
	Wales U21	10 Caps	
	Wales U18	11 caps	
Medal record
Welsh Youth Cup Winner 1995
FAW Premier Cup Winner 1999-00
FAW Premier Cup Winner 2000-01
League 1 Promotion Winner 2002-03
FAW Premier Cup Winner 2002-03
FAW Premier Cup Winner 2003-04
- * Club domestic league appearances and goals

Stephen Thomas (born 23 June 1979) is a former professional footballer who played in the Football League for Wrexham, Darlington and York City. Although Stephen was born in Hartlepool, England, he qualified to play for Wales through his grandfather. Stephen represented Wales at U18 and U21 international level. Stephen made his first team debut for Wrexham AFC in August 1997 in the Group B FAW Premier Cup v Newtown age 18 and his full league debut for Wrexham AFC against Stoke City on September 19th 1998. His first league goal was against Brighton & Hove Albion.

.Thomas was signed by York City in February 2006.

Last gasp Thomas sends Wrexham through - Wales Online

Wrexham 4 - 2 Barry Town | Thursday, May 10th, 2001 | Match Details (Wrexham AFC Archive)

Wrexham AFC v Manchester United | 2001

QPR v Wrexham - 2001/02

https://x.com/78spirit/status/1848665615000559627?s=46&t=kMDBqyKrpgxRCCSbidpcFw
