= Kristian Rogers =

English footballer

Personal information
- Date of birth: 2 October 1980 (age 46)
- Place of birth: Chester, England
- Position: Goalkeeper

Senior career*
| Years | Team | Apps | (Gls) |
| 1999–2003 | Wrexham | 57 | (0) |
| 2000–2001 | → Rushden & Diamonds (loan) | 6 | (0) |
| 2003–2004 | Sheffield United | 1 | (0) |
| 2004 | → Macclesfield Town (loan) | 0 | (0) |
| 2004–2005 | Worksop Town | 34 | (0) |
| 2005–2006 | Northwich Victoria | 47 | (0) |
| 2006–2009 | Port Talbot Town | 97 | (0) |
| 2009–2011 | Airbus UK Broughton | 45 | (0) |
| 2011–2012 | Port Talbot Town | 18 | (0) |
| 2012–2013 | Conwy United | | |
| 2013 | Afan Lido | 6 | (0) |
- * Club domestic league appearances and goals

Kristian Rogers (born 2 October 1980) is an English former footballer.

== Career ==
=== Wrexham ===
An England schoolboys international, Rogers began his career at Wrexham, making his professional debut at the end of the 1999–2000 season on 24 April 2000 in a 1–0 win over Colchester United. He remained as backup the following season, making a total of six appearances in all competitions for Wrexham as well as spending two months on loan at Conference National side Rushden & Diamonds, where he made two appearances as cover for the suspended Billy Turley, before taking over as the club's first choice goalkeeper for the majority of the 2001–02 season, which saw him handed a new one-year deal with the club.

The arrival of Andy Dibble at the Racecourse Ground in 2002 saw Rogers lose his place in the side and he found himself transfer listed when he also fell behind Paul Whitfield, which later lead to his departure from the club in May 2003.

=== Sheffield United ===
Rogers came close to signing for Swansea City, eventually joining Sheffield United. He made his debut for the Blades in a 2–0 defeat to Queens Park Rangers in the second round of the Football League Cup on 23 September 2003. However, the match was his only appearance for the club and, after spending time on loan with Division Three side Macclesfield Town without playing, he was released at the end of the 2003–04 season.

=== Northwich Victoria ===
Following his release, Rogers joined Conference North side Worksop Town on a non-contract basis. In March 2005, he moved to Conference National side Northwich Victoria, playing in the final seven league matches of the 2004–05 season as the club suffered relegation. He remained as Northwich's first choice goalkeeper for the 2005–06 season, missing just two league games as he helped the club win promotion back to the Conference National as Conference North champions.

=== Welsh Premier League ===
After leaving Northwich Victoria, Rogers joined Welsh Premier League club Port Talbot Town. At Victoria Road, he established himself as the number one goalkeeper, making 97 league appearances and helping the side to three consecutive top six finishes during a three-year spell. However, in August 2009, Port Talbot announced the signing of Rhyl goalkeeper Lee Kendall and, despite manager Mark Jones' hopes that he would remain at the club, Rogers instead opted to leave and sign with Airbus UK Broughton. On his departure, Port Talbot Town chairman Andrew Edwards described Rogers as being "without doubt one of the best goalkeepers in the Welsh Premier".

Rogers was chosen ahead of Phillip Palethorpe for the first team spot at Airbus, making his debut in a 2–2 draw with Llanelli in the opening game of the 2009–10 season.

In July 2011 he re-joined Port Talbot Town.

== Honours ==
Northwich Victoria

- Conference South Winner: 1

2005–06
