= Mark Evans (footballer, born 1982) =

English footballer

Personal information
- Date of birth: 16 September 1982 (age 44)
- Place of birth: Chester, England
- Position: Full back

Senior career*
Years	Team	Apps	(Gls)
2002–2003	Wrexham	5	(0)
- Caernarfon Town
Total		5	(0)
- * Club domestic league appearances and goals

Mark Evans (born 16 September 1982) is an English former professional footballer who played as a full back.

== Career ==
Born in Chester, Evans played for Wrexham and Caernarfon Town.
