= Stephen Roberts (footballer, born 1980) =

Welsh footballer

Steve Roberts
Personal information
- Full name: Stephen Wyn Roberts
- Date of birth: 24 February 1980 (age 46)
- Place of birth: Wrexham, Wales
- Height: 6 ft 0 in (1.83 m)
- Position: Defender

Senior career*
Years	Team	Apps	(Gls)
1998–2005	Wrexham	150	(6)
2005–2008	Doncaster Rovers	73	(1)
2008–2009	Walsall	16	(1)
Total		239	(8)

International career
1996	Wales U17	1	(0)
1996–1999	Wales U19	10	(0)
1999–2001	Wales U21	3	(0)
2005	Wales	1	(0)
- * Club domestic league appearances and goals

Stephen Wyn Roberts (born 24 February 1980) is a Welsh former professional footballer who most recently played for Walsall. He has also represented Wales at under-21 level.

== Career ==
Roberts began his career at hometown club Wrexham, where he took part in the club's Football League Trophy win in 2005, before eventually moving to Doncaster Rovers where he joined up with his brother Neil Roberts who eventually moved on to join Wrexham.

On 1 July 2008, Roberts opted to turn down a new one-year contract at Doncaster Rovers, to drop down to League One to play for Walsall on a two-year contract. He became the "Saddlers" first signing of the 2008 pre-season.

On 8 October 2009, Roberts announced his retirement from the game at the age of 29 due to a persistent back injury.

== Honours ==
Wrexham

- Football League Trophy: 2004–05
