= 2002–03 FAW Premier Cup =

Tournament details
- Country: England; Wales
- Teams: 12

Final positions
- Champions: Wrexham
- Runner-up: Newport County

The 2002–03 FAW Premier Cup was the sixth season of the tournament since its founding in 1997.

== Group A ==
Home	Score	Away
Caersws	2 - 4	Cwmbran Town
Cwmbran Town	1 - 2	Afan Lido
Rhyl	4 - 1	Cwmbran Town
Caersws	1 - 1	Rhyl
Rhyl	2 - 1	Afan Lido
Cwmbran Town	0 - 1	Caersws
Afan Lido	1 - 3	Rhyl
Caersws	2 - 3	Afan Lido
Cwmbran Town	3 - 2	Rhyl
Rhyl	1 - 1	Caersws
Afan Lido	1 - 0	Cwmbran Town
Afan Lido	2 - 1	Caersws

Team	Pld	W	D	L	GF	GA	GD	Pts
Afan Lido	6	4	0	2	10	9	+1	12
Rhyl	6	3	2	1	13	8	+5	11
Cwmbran Town	6	2	0	4	9	12	−3	6
Caersws	6	1	2	3	8	11	−3	5

== Group B ==
Home	Score	Away
Connah's Quay Nomads	1 - 1	Newport County
Connah's Quay Nomads	1 - 2	Bangor City
Bangor City	1 - 1	Total Network Solutions
Connah's Quay Nomads	1 - 3	Total Network Solutions
Newport County	1 - 0	Total Network Solutions
Newport County	1 - 1	Connah's Quay Nomads
Total Network Solutions	5 - 0	Bangor City
Total Network Solutions	3 - 0	Newport County
Newport County	1 - 1	Bangor City
Total Network Solutions	4 - 0	Connah's Quay Nomads
Bangor City	2 - 3	Connah's Quay Nomads
Bangor City	1 - 1	Newport County

Team	Pld	W	D	L	GF	GA	GD	Pts
Total Network Solutions	6	4	1	1	16	3	+13	13
Newport County	6	1	4	1	5	7	−2	7
Bangor City	6	1	3	2	7	12	−5	6
Connah's Quay Nomads	6	1	2	3	7	13	−6	5

== Quarter finals ==
Home	Score	Away
Afan Lido	0 - 4	Wrexham
Rhyl	1 - 1	Barry Town
Newport County	3 - 1	Swansea City
Total Network Solutions	1 - 3	Cardiff City

== Semi finals ==
Home	Score	Away
Newport County	0 - 0	Cardiff City
Wrexham	4 - 0	Rhyl

== Final ==
Home	Score	Away
Wrexham	6 - 1	Newport County
