= Brian Carey =

Irish footballer and manager

Personal information
- Full name: Brian Patrick Carey
- Date of birth: 31 May 1968 (age 58)
- Place of birth: Cork, Ireland
- Position: Centre-back

Youth career
- Greenwood
- Albert Rovers

Senior career*
| Years | Team | Apps | (Gls) |
| 1988–1989 | Cork City | 21 | (0) |
| 1989–1993 | Manchester United | 0 | (0) |
| 1991 | → Wrexham (loan) | 3 | (0) |
| 1991–1992 | → Wrexham (loan) | 13 | (1) |
| 1993–1996 | Leicester City | 58 | (1) |
| 1996–2005 | Wrexham | 288 | (15) |
| 2006–2007 | Wrexham | 0 | (0) |

International career
| 1992–1994 | Republic of Ireland | 3 | (0) |

Managerial career
- 2007: Wrexham
- 2008: Wrexham (caretaker)
- 2008–2011: Wrexham (assistant)
- 2011–2013: Doncaster Rovers (assistant)
- 2013: Wolverhampton Wanderers (assistant)
- 2015: Chesterfield (assistant)
- 2016: Blackburn Rovers (Coach)
- 2018: Tottenham Hotspur (Head of Recruitment)
- 2022–: Reading (Head of Recruitment)
- * Club domestic league appearances and goals

Brian Patrick Carey (born 31 May 1968) is an Irish former international footballer who played in the Football League for Leicester City as well as Wrexham, whom he also served as manager. Since his playing retirement he has worked as the Assistant Manager at Doncaster Rovers, Wolverhampton Wanderers and Chesterfield. He was the Lead Professional Development a Coach at Blackburn Rovers until May 2015. He is a UEFA A Licence Coach, holds a BSc in Sport Coaching and Exercise Science and he has represented Republic of Ireland at Senior International Level.

== Playing career ==
Carey started his football career with Greenwood FC in Togher, Cork. He also played for Albert Rovers. He later signed for Cork City where he made a number of appearances in the centre of defence in a season that ended in defeat in the 1989 FAI Cup Final.

After several impressive displays, Carey signed by Sir Alex Ferguson for Manchester United on 24 August 1989 and he stayed there for four years. During his time at Manchester United, Carey joined Wrexham on loan and played in the memorable FA Cup third round tie where they knocked out reigning league champions Arsenal 2–1 at the Racecourse Ground in January 1992. In November 1993, he was transferred to Leicester City and within three years had rejoined Wrexham on a permanent deal, having played 58 times in the league for the Foxes. The highlight of his time at Filbert Street came in the 1994 Division One playoff final, when he helped them beat local rivals Derby County 2–1 and win promotion at Wembley to the Premier League after seven years away from the top flight.

His time at the Racecourse Ground spanned nine years, where he was captain and virtually an ever-present under manager Brian Flynn. Following his retirement as a player through injury in July 2005, he remained at Wrexham as a coach.

== Management career ==
After the sacking of Wrexham manager Denis Smith in January 2007, Carey was promoted to take charge of the club on a temporary basis until the end of the season. At time the team were in severe danger of relegation to the Conference, but survived after 3–1 win against relegation rivals Boston United on the final day of the season.

After preserving the club's Football League status, Carey was offered the manager's role on a permanent basis, signing a two-year contract. After a poor start to the new season, however, he was replaced as manager by Brian Little, but remained on the club's staff mainly operating as a scout. Following Little's eventual departure in September 2008 soon after relegation to the Conference National, Carey and Martin Foyle briefly took over as caretaker managers.

When Dean Saunders was appointed Wrexham manager in October 2008, Carey was given the role of assistant manager. When Wrexham were top of the league Carey then followed Saunders when he moved to Doncaster Rovers of the Championship in September 2011 to again serve as his assistant manager. Here, the duo saw the club relegated to League One at the end of the season. The duo assembled their own team for the 2012–13 campaign and by January the team were top of the league.

Carey was again recruited by Saunders when he was offered the managerial job at Wolverhampton Wanderers in January 2013, but their stay with the club lasted only four months.

Carey was then appointed Professional Development Lead Phase Coach at Blackburn Rovers Academy where he worked for two years.

He was once again re-united with Dean Saunders after being appointed his assistant at Chesterfield in June 2015.

He later enjoyed two years as a coach at Blackburn Rovers before moving into recruitment with Tottenham Hotspur, initially being appointed as Senior Scout for the north-west of England, his net was widened to cover European football and he would soon become Head of Recruitment at White Hart Lane.

Brian left Spurs in April 2022, but was soon snapped up by Championship side Reading to work closely with Head of Football Operations, Mark Bowen, first team manager Paul Ince and Academy Manager Michael Gilkes in bringing the brightest talent to Reading.

"Brian is a man who has experienced it all in football – he has been a player, captain, a coach, an assistant manager, a manager and has recently excelled during four years spent as Head of Recruitment at Spurs," Bowen said.

"He proved the ideal candidate to help the owner, myself and the manager bring in players with ability but who also possess the right character and temperament for our club and have that hunger to succeed and the potential to improve. It is a real coup that we have managed to beat off competition to secure the services of a man with his wealth of experience and I'm delighted he has agreed to join us at Reading." https://www.readingfc.co.uk/news/2022/may/19/royals-appoint-brian-carey-as-director-of-recruitment/

== Managerial statistics ==
As of 27 September 2008.

| Team | Nat | From | To | Record | | | | |
| Team | Nat | From | To | G | W | L | D | Win % |
|---|---|---|---|---|---|---|---|---|
| Wrexham | (Wales) | 11 January 2007 | 15 November 2007 | 40 | 9 | 23 | 8 | 22.50 |
| Wrexham (caretaker) | (Wales) | 27 September 2008 | 2 October 2008 | 1 | 0 | 0 | 1 | 00.00 |

== Honours ==
Leicester City

- Football League First Division play-offs: 1994

Individual

- Denzil Haroun Reserve Team Player of the Year: 1991–92
