= Aaron James (English footballer) =

English footballer (born 2001)

Personal information
- Full name: Aaron Thomas James
- Date of birth: 30 June 2005 (age 21)
- Place of birth: Chester, England
- Position: Defender

Team information
- Current team: Wrexham
- Number: 34

Youth career
- Wrexham

Senior career*
| Years | Team | Apps | (Gls) |
| 2021– | Wrexham | 1 | (0) |
| 2025 | → Warrington Town (loan) | 17 | (1) |
- * Club domestic league appearances and goals

Aaron Thomas James (born 30 June 2005) is an English professional footballer who plays as a defender for EFL Championship side Wrexham.

== Youth career ==
James was a part of Wrexham's youth team, eventually becoming the youth team captain.

== Career ==
At the age of 16, James signed his first professional deal with Wrexham on 10 December 2021. On 13 January 2023, he made his first team debut in a FA Trophy 4th round match against Altrincham, a 2–2 draw which saw Wrexham being eliminated on penalties.

James made his league debut to cover for injuries to Anthony Forde and Jacob Mendy and a suspension to Ryan Barnett on 14 October 2023, in a 3–2 home win in EFL League Two against Salford City.

On 4 February 2025, it was announced that James would be loaned out to National League North team Warrington Town for the remainder of the 2024–25 season. At the end of the season Wrexham extended James contract for another season.

== Career statistics ==
As of match played 16 June 2025

Appearances and goals by club, season and competition
| Club | Season | League | | | FA Cup | | EFL Cup | | Other | | Total | |
| Club | Season | Division | Apps | Goals | Apps | Goals | Apps | Goals | Apps | Goals | Apps | Goals |
|---|---|---|---|---|---|---|---|---|---|---|---|---|
| Wrexham | 2022–23 | National League | 0 | 0 | 0 | 0 | — | | 1 (Note: Appearance in FA Trophy) | 0 | 1 | 0 |
| Wrexham | 2023–24 | League Two | 1 | 0 | 0 | 0 | 0 | 0 | 3 (Note: Appearance(s) in EFL Trophy) | 0 | 4 | 0 |
| Wrexham | 2024–25 | League One | 0 | 0 | 0 | 0 | 0 | 0 | 3 | 1 | 3 | 1 |
| Wrexham | Total | | 1 | 0 | 0 | 0 | 0 | 0 | 7 | 1 | 8 | 1 |
| Warrington Town (loan) | 2024–25 | National League North | 17 | 1 | 0 | 0 | 0 | 0 | 3 | 1 | 20 | 2 |
| Career total | | | 18 | 1 | 0 | 0 | 0 | 0 | 10 | 2 | 28 | 3 |

== Honours ==
Wrexham

- EFL League Two second-place promotion: 2023–24
