= 2024–25 Wrexham A.F.C. season =

Welsh football club season

Wrexham A.F.C.
2024–25 season
- Owner: Wrexham Holdings LLC (Ryan Reynolds and Rob McElhenney)
- Manager: Phil Parkinson
- Stadium: STōK Cae Ras
- League One: 2nd (promoted)
- FA Cup: First round
- EFL Cup: First round
- EFL Trophy: Semi-finals
- Top goalscorer: League: Steven Fletcher; Elliot Lee; Oliver Rathbone (8 each); All: Elliot Lee (9)
- Highest home attendance: 13,341 (7 September 2024 vs Shrewsbury Town)
- Lowest home attendance: 3,119 (10 December 2024 vs Crewe Alexandra)
- Average home league attendance: 12,781
- Biggest win: 3–0 (24 August 2024 vs Reading) (7 September 2024 vs Shrewsbury Town) (23 November 2024 vs Exeter City) (5 April 2025 vs Burton Albion) (26 April 2025 vs Charlton Athletic); 4–1 (5 October 2024 vs Northampton Town)
- Biggest defeat: 2–4 (13 August 2024 vs Sheffield United); 1–3 (16 September 2024 vs Birmingham City)
Home colours	Away colours	Third colours

The 2024–25 season was the 160th season in the history of Wrexham Association Football Club, and began with the five thousandth recorded league match for the club. This was their first season back in League One since 2004–05, following successive promotions from the National League two years earlier and League Two the previous season. In addition to the league, they competed in the FA Cup, EFL Cup and advanced to the semi-finals of the EFL Trophy.

On 26 April 2025, Wrexham beat Charlton Athletic 3–0 at home to seal 2nd place in the league and promotion to the EFL Championship, making Wrexham the first team in the history of English football to be promoted in three consecutive years within the top five divisions and marked their return to the 2nd tier for the first time since the 1981–82 season.

The season was chronicled in the fourth season of the documentary series Welcome to Wrexham.

== First-team squad ==
As of 30 June 2025

No.	Player	Nat.	Pos.	Date of birth (age)	Previous club	Signed on	Contract ends	Apps.	Goals
Goalkeepers
1	Arthur Okonkwo	(England)	GK	9 September 2001 (aged 23)	Arsenal	1 September 2023	30 June 2027	77	0
13	Callum Burton	(England)	GK	15 August 1996 (aged 28)	Plymouth Argyle	15 July 2024	30 June 2026	8	0
21	Mark Howard	(England)	GK	21 September 1986 (aged 38)	Carlisle United	5 July 2022	30 June 2025	60	0
31	Luke McNicholas	(Republic of Ireland)	GK	1 January 2000 (aged 25)	Sligo Rovers	23 January 2024	30 June 2026	3	0
32	Brad Foster	(England)	GK	5 October 2001 (aged 23)	West Bromwich Albion	7 December 2024	30 June 2025	1	0
41	Liam Hall	(England)	GK	18 December 2004 (aged 20)	Bradford (Park Avenue)	18 August 2023	30 June 2025	0	0
Defenders
3	Lewis Brunt	(England)	CB	6 November 2000 (aged 24)	Leicester City	2 July 2024	30 June 2027	29	1
4	Max Cleworth	(England)	CB	9 August 2002 (aged 22)	Academy	1 February 2021	30 June 2027	147	10
5	Eoghan O'Connell	(Republic of Ireland)	CB	13 August 1995 (aged 29)	Charlton Athletic	31 January 2023	30 June 2026	89	2
19	Jacob Mendy	(The Gambia)	LWB	27 December 1996 (aged 28)	Boreham Wood	1 August 2022	30 June 2026	77	6
24	Dan Scarr	(England)	DF	24 December 1994 (aged 30)	Plymouth Argyle	2 August 2024	30 June 2027	20	0
25	Will Boyle	(England)	CB	1 September 1995 (aged 29)	Huddersfield Town	13 July 2023	30 June 2026	31	6
29	Ryan Barnett	(England)	RWB	23 September 1999 (aged 25)	Solihull Moors	24 February 2023	30 June 2027	94	4
44	Harry Dean	(Wales)	CB	21 March 2006 (aged 19)	Academy	1 July 2024	30 June 2025	0	0
Midfielders
6	Thomas O'Connor	(Republic of Ireland)	DM	21 April 1999 (aged 26)	Burton Albion	31 January 2022	30 June 2027	115	8
7	James McClean	(Republic of Ireland)	DM	22 April 1989 (aged 36)	Wigan Athletic	4 August 2023	30 June 2026	89	8
8	Andy Cannon	(England)	CM	14 March 1996 (aged 29)	Hull City	9 December 2022	30 June 2026	88	12
12	George Evans	(England)	DM	13 December 1994 (aged 30)	Millwall	1 September 2023	30 June 2026	43	0
15	George Dobson	(England)	MF	15 November 1997 (aged 27)	Charlton Athletic	6 July 2024	30 June 2027	48	2
17	Luke Bolton	(England)	DM	7 October 1999 (aged 25)	Salford City	1 February 2024	30 June 2026	20	0
20	Oliver Rathbone	(England)	CM	10 October 1996 (aged 28)	Rotherham United	9 August 2024	30 June 2027	48	8
23	Sebastian Revan	(England)	MF	14 July 2003 (aged 21)	Aston Villa	15 July 2024	30 June 2027	27	1
33	Josh Adam	(Scotland)	AM	3 February 2004 (aged 21)	Manchester City	9 September 2024	30 June 2025	2	0
37	Matty James	(England)	CM	22 July 1991 (aged 33)	Bristol City	25 October 2024	30 June 2026	33	2
38	Elliot Lee	(England)	AM	16 December 1994 (aged 30)	Luton Town	8 July 2022	30 June 2027	139	40
45	Harry Ashfield	(Wales)	RM	23 March 2006 (aged 19)	Academy	1 July 2022	30 June 2027	6	1
47	Ryan Longman	(England)	MF	6 November 2000 (aged 24)	Hull City	24 January 2025	30 June 2027	21	1
Forwards
9	Ollie Palmer	(England)	CF	21 January 1992 (aged 33)	AFC Wimbledon	24 January 2022	30 June 2026	155	44
10	Paul Mullin	(England)	CF	6 November 1994 (aged 30)	Cambridge United	23 July 2021	30 June 2027	172	110
11	Jack Marriott	(England)	CF	9 September 1994 (aged 30)	Fleetwood Town	1 February 2024	30 June 2026	47	7
16	Jay Rodriguez	(England)	FW	29 July 1989 (aged 35)	Burnley	31 January 2025	30 June 2026	18	2
22	Modou Faal	(The Gambia)	FW	11 February 2003 (aged 22)	West Bromwich Albion	30 August 2024	30 June 2027	16	3
26	Steven Fletcher	(Scotland)	CF	26 March 1987 (aged 38)	Dundee United	8 September 2023	30 June 2025	77	16
28	Sam Smith	(England)	FW	8 March 1998 (aged 27)	Reading	31 January 2025	30 June 2028	19	7
Out on loan
-	Jake Bickerstaff	(England)	CF	11 September 2001 (aged 23)	Academy	1 July 2020	30 June 2026	28	6
-	Sam Dalby	(England)	CF	7 December 1999 (aged 25)	Southend United	1 August 2022	30 June 2025	91	13
-	Jordan Davies	(Wales)	CM	18 October 1998 (aged 26)	Brighton & Hove Albion	25 August 2020	30 June 2025	149	37
-	Callum Edwards	(England)	FW	22 June 2006 (aged 19)	Academy	1 July 2021	30 June 2025	0	0
-	Aaron James	(England)	CB	30 June 2005 (aged 20)	Academy	1 July 2023	30 June 2025	8	1
-	James Rainbird	(England)	FW	1 September 2005 (aged 18)	Academy	1 July 2021	30 June 2025	0	0

== Transfers ==
=== In ===
Date	Pos.	Nat.	Name	From	Fee	Ref
1 July 2024 (Note: The transfer was announced on 22 June, and would become official on 1 July once his Arsenal contract expired)	GK	(England)	Arthur Okonkwo	(England) Arsenal	Free	
2 July 2024	CB	(England)	Lewis Brunt	(England) Leicester City	Undisclosed	
6 July 2024	DM	(England)	George Dobson	(England) Charlton Athletic	Free	
15 July 2024	GK	(England)	Callum Burton	(England) Plymouth Argyle	Free	
15 July 2024	LB	(England)	Sebastian Revan	(England) Aston Villa	£350k	
2 August 2024	CB	(England)	Dan Scarr	(England) Plymouth Argyle	Undisclosed	
9 August 2024	MF	(England)	Oliver Rathbone	(England) Rotherham United	£420k	
30 August 2024	FW	(The Gambia)	Modou Faal	(England) West Bromwich Albion	£590k	
9 September 2024	AM	(Scotland)	Josh Adam	(England) Manchester City	Free	
25 October 2024	CM	(England)	Matty James	(England) Bristol City	Free	
25 October 2024	FW	(Iceland)	Jón Daði Böðvarsson	(England) Bolton Wanderers	Free	
7 December 2024	GK	(England)	Brad Foster	Free agent	Free	
24 January 2025	LW	(England)	Ryan Longman	(England) Hull City	£500k	
31 January 2025	FW	(England)	Sam Smith	(England) Reading	£2m	
31 January 2025	FW	(England)	Jay Rodriguez	(England) Burnley	Undisclosed	

=== Out ===
Date	Pos.	Nat.	Name	To	Fee	Ref
16 January 2025	FW	(England)	Billy Waters	(England) Oldham Athletic	Free	
16 January 2025	FW	(Iceland)	Jón Daði Böðvarsson	(England) Burton Albion	Free	
31 January 2025	CM	(Scotland)	James Jones	(England) Burton Albion	Undisclosed	

=== Loaned out ===
Date	Pos.	Nat.	Name	To	Date until	Ref
15 July 2024	GK	(Republic of Ireland)	Luke McNicholas	(England) Rochdale	1 February 2025 (Note: On 1 February, McNicholas was recalled from his loan at Rochdale)	
8 August 2024	CM	(Wales)	Jordan Davies	(England) Grimsby Town	End of season	
30 August 2024	FW	(England)	Jake Bickerstaff	(England) Altrincham	End of Season (Note: On 14 January, Bickerstaff's loan at Altrincham was extended until end of season)	
30 August 2024	FW	(England)	Billy Waters	(England) FC Halifax Town	1 January 2025	
30 August 2024	FW	(England)	Sam Dalby	(Scotland) Dundee United	End of season	
21 January 2025	FW	(England)	Callum Edwards	(Wales) Bala Town	End of season	
3 February 2025	FW	(England)	James Rainbird	(Wales) Newtown	End of Season	
4 February 2025	DF	(England)	Aaron James	(England) Warrington Town	End of Season	

=== Released / Out of Contract ===
Date	Pos.	Nat.	Name	Subsequent club	Join date	Ref.
30 June 2024	CB	(England)	Aaron Hayden	(England) Carlisle United	1 July 2024	
30 June 2024	CB	(Wales)	Scott Butler	(England) Marine	1 July 2024	
30 June 2024	CM	(England)	Owen Cushion	(England) Prescot Cables	2 August 2024	
30 June 2024	LB	(Wales)	Daniel Davies	(Wales) Flint Town	1 July 2024	
30 June 2024	GK	(England)	Rob Lainton	(England) Altrincham	25 February 2025	
30 June 2024	LB	(Scotland)	Callum McFadzean	(England) Radcliffe	4 June 2025	
30 June 2024	CB	(England)	Ben Tozer	(England) Forest Green Rovers	1 July 2024	
30 June 2024	CB	(England)	Jordan Tunnicliffe	(England) Solihull Moors	6 August 2024	
30 June 2024	CM	(England)	Luke Young	(England) Cheltenham Town	1 July 2024	
3 February 2025	DM	(Republic of Ireland)	Anthony Forde	(England) Burton Albion	20 February 2025	

=== New contracts ===
Date	Pos.	Nat.	Name	Contract until	Ref.
3 May 2024	RM	(Wales)	Harry Ashfield	30 June 2025	
3 May 2024	CF	(England)	Callum Edwards	30 June 2025	
3 May 2024	GK	(England)	Liam Hall	30 June 2025	
18 June 2024	FW	(Scotland)	Steven Fletcher	30 June 2025	
19 June 2024	GK	(England)	Mark Howard	30 June 2025	
20 June 2024	DF	(England)	Aaron James	30 June 2025	
24 June 2024	DF	(England)	Harry Dean	30 June 2025	
1 July 2024	MF	(England)	George Evans	30 June 2026	
4 July 2024	DF	(England)	Max Cleworth	30 June 2027	
9 July 2024	MF	(Republic of Ireland)	Thomas O'Connor	30 June 2027	
7 August 2024	LM	(Republic of Ireland)	James McClean	30 June 2026	
9 August 2024	MF	(England)	Andy Cannon	30 June 2026	
15 October 2024	FW	(England)	Ollie Palmer	30 June 2026	
22 November 2024	MF	(England)	Ryan Barnett	30 June 2027	
19 December 2024	MF	(England)	Matty James	30 June 2026	
17 January 2025	GK	(England)	Brad Foster	30 June 2025	
24 January 2025	FW	(England)	Jack Marriott	30 June 2026	
24 January 2025	MF	(The Gambia)	Jacob Mendy	30 June 2026	
20 March 2025	RM	(Wales)	Harry Ashfield	30 June 2027	

== Pre-season and friendlies ==
On 25 April, Wrexham announced a return to North America for a tour during pre-season, with matches against Bournemouth, Chelsea, and the Vancouver Whitecaps. Two months later, a third fixture was announced versus Hanley Town. In July, a fifth pre-season match was confirmed to be against Fleetwood Town.

Win Draw Loss Fixtures

13 July 2024 Friendly	Hanley Town	1–5	Wrexham	Hanley
13:00 BST	Blake 56'	Report	McClean 41'; Davis 49', 65'; Dalby 53'; Bickerstaff 75'	Stadium: Afford Rent A Car Stadium

21 July 2024 Friendly	Wrexham	1–1	Bournemouth	Santa Barbara, United States
16:00 PDT	Hill 45+2' (o.g.)	Report	Senesi 53'	Stadium: Harder Stadium; Attendance: 13,322

24 July 2024 Friendly	Wrexham	2–2	Chelsea	Santa Clara, United States
19:00 PDT	Bolton 58'; Marriott 71'	Report	Nkunku 35'; Ugochukwu 82'	Stadium: Levi's Stadium; Attendance: 32,724

27 July 2024 Friendly	Vancouver Whitecaps	1–4	Wrexham	Vancouver, Canada
16:30 PDT	Bovalina 55' (Ahmed)	Report	Revan 31' (Lee); McClean 68' (Lee); Lee 71' (Barnett); Davis 83' (Bolton)	Stadium: BC Place; Attendance: 34,738; Referee: Pierre-Luc Lauziere

3 August 2024 Friendly	Wrexham	1–0	Fleetwood Town	Wrexham
15:00 BST	Cleworth 70'	Report		Stadium: Racecourse Ground; Attendance: 6,376

== Competitions ==
=== Overall record ===
Competition	First match	Last match	Starting round	Final position	Record							
Competition	First match	Last match	Starting round	Final position	Pld	W	D	L	GF	GA	GD	Win %
League One	10 August 2024	3 May 2025	Matchday 1	2nd	46	27	11	8	67	34	+33	58.70
FA Cup	3 November 2024		First round	First round	1	0	0	1	0	1	−1	0.00
EFL Cup	13 August 2024		First round	First round	1	0	0	1	2	4	−2	0.00
EFL Trophy	10 September 2024	26 February 2025	Group stage	Semi-finals	7	5	2	0	14	5	+9	71.43
Total					55	32	13	10	83	44	+39	58.18

Source: Soccerway

Source: Competitive matches

=== League One ===
==== League table ====
Pos	Team	Pld	W	D	L	GF	GA	GD	Pts	Promotion, qualification or relegation
1	Birmingham City (C, P)	46	34	9	3	84	31	+53	111	Promotion to EFL Championship
2	Wrexham (P)	46	27	11	8	67	34	+33	92	Promotion to EFL Championship
3	Stockport County	46	25	12	9	72	42	+30	87	Qualification for League One play-offs
4	Charlton Athletic (O, P)	46	25	10	11	67	43	+24	85	Qualification for League One play-offs
5	Wycombe Wanderers	46	24	12	10	70	45	+25	84	Qualification for League One play-offs

Source: EFL Official Website
Rules for classification: 1) Points; 2) Goal difference; 3) Number of goals scored; 4) Head-to-head results; 5) Wins; 6) Away goals; 7) Penalty points (sec 9.5); 8) 12-point sending off offences
(C) Champions; (O) Play-off winners; (P) Promoted

==== Results summary ====
Overall								Home						Away					
Pld	W	D	L	GF	GA	GD	Pts	W	D	L	GF	GA	GD	W	D	L	GF	GA	GD
46	27	11	8	67	34	+33	92	16	5	2	41	15	+26	11	6	6	26	19	+7

Source: Soccerway

==== Matches ====
On 26 June, the League One fixtures were announced.

Win Draw Loss Fixtures

10 August 2024 1	Wrexham	3–2	Wycombe Wanderers	Wrexham
17:30 BST	Cleworth 9'; Marriott 29' (Palmer); Cannon (yellow card) 63'; Dobson (yellow card) 71'; Fletcher 83'	Report	Bakinson (yellow card) 27'; Kone 58'; Vokes 89' (Leahy)	Stadium: STōK Cae Ras; Attendance: 13,214; Referee: Oliver Yates

18 August 2024 2	Bolton Wanderers	0–0	Wrexham	Horwich
15:00 BST	Ricardo (yellow card) 50'; Schön (yellow card) 65'	Report	O'Connor (yellow card) 70'	Stadium: Toughsheet Community Stadium; Attendance: 25,957; Referee: Benjamin Speedie
Note: Fixture was initially scheduled for 17 August, but was moved for live Sky Sports broadcast.

24 August 2024 3	Wrexham	3–0	Reading	Wrexham
15:00 BST	Palmer 23' (Barnett); Lee 33'; Cannon 49' (Lee)	Report	Smith (yellow card) 28'; Elliott (yellow card) 56'	Stadium: STōK Cae Ras; Attendance: 13,322; Referee: Ross Joyce

31 August 2024 4	Peterborough United	0–2	Wrexham	Peterborough
15:00 BST	Sparkes (yellow card) 47'	Report	Marriott; Cleworth 39' (O'Connor); Palmer (yellow card) 45+1'; Mullin (yellow card) 88'	Stadium: Weston Homes Stadium; Attendance: 12,104; Referee: Carl Brook

7 September 2024 5	Wrexham	3–0	Shrewsbury Town	Wrexham
15:00 BST	Palmer 19'; McClean (yellow card) 28'; Dobson (yellow card) 35'; Lee 42' (Barnett) (yellow card) 44'; Marriott 59'	Report	Benning (yellow card) 8'; Ojo (yellow card) 69'; Winchester (yellow card) 76'; Lloyd (yellow card) 90'	Stadium: STōK Cae Ras; Attendance: 13,341; Referee: Alex Chilowicz (United States)

16 September 2024 6	Birmingham City	3–1	Wrexham	Birmingham
20:00 BST	Stansfield 22' 52' (Cochrane); Klarer (yellow card) 36'; Gardner-Hickman (yellow card) 54'; Iwata 59' (Paik Seung-ho); Bielik (yellow card) 81' (yellow-red card) 86'; Anderson (yellow card) 82'	Report	Marriott 3' (O'Connell); McClean (yellow card) 81'; Cannon (yellow card) 81'; Mullin (yellow card) 82'	Stadium: St Andrew's; Attendance: 27,980; Referee: Scott Oldham
Note: Fixture was initially scheduled for 14 September, but was moved for live Sky Sports broadcast.

21 September 2024 7	Wrexham	2–1	Crawley Town	Wrexham
15:00 BST	Lee 24' (Cleworth); Dobson (yellow card) 50'; Cleworth	Report	Quitirna 54' (Darcy)	Stadium: STōK Cae Ras; Attendance: 12,732; Referee: Martin Coy

28 September 2024 8	Leyton Orient	0–0	Wrexham	Leyton
15:00 BST	Beckles (yellow card) 51'	Report	O'Connell (yellow card) 19'; Dobson (yellow card) 28'; Cannon (yellow card) 45+2'	Stadium: Gaughan Group Stadium; Attendance: 8,705; Referee: Sunny Singh Gill

1 October 2024 9	Stevenage	1–0	Wrexham	Stevenage
19:45 BST	Thompson; Butler (yellow card) 27'; Roberts (yellow card) 88'	Report	O'Connor (yellow card) 39'; Cannon (yellow card) 68'; O'Connell (yellow card) 90+4'	Stadium: Lamex Stadium; Attendance: 5,704; Referee: Will Finnie

5 October 2024 10	Wrexham	4–1	Northampton Town	Wrexham
15:00 BST	McClean 8' (Barnett) (yellow card) 29' (goal) 67'; Marriott 38' (McClean); Lee 56' (Barnett)	Report	McGeehan 27' (Eaves); Sowerby (yellow card) 31'; Hoskins (yellow card) 75'	Stadium: STōK Cae Ras; Attendance: 13,324; Referee: Geoff Eltringham

19 October 2024 12	Rotherham United	0–1	Wrexham	Rotherham
15:00 BST	Powell (yellow card) 75'	Report	Mullin 1' (Barnett) (yellow card) 45+3'; Scarr (yellow card) 45+1'; Palmer (yellow card) 53'	Stadium: AESSEAL New York Stadium; Attendance: 11,235; Referee: Ben Atkinson

22 October 2024 13	Wrexham	0–0	Huddersfield Town	Wrexham
19:45 BST	O'Connell (yellow card) 48'	Report	Lonwijk (yellow card) 20'; Kasumu (yellow card) 52'; Miller (yellow card) 75'	Stadium: STōK Cae Ras; Attendance: 12,894; Referee: Adam Herczeg

26 October 2024 14	Charlton Athletic	2–2	Wrexham	Charlton
15:00 BST	Gillesphey; Edwards (yellow card) 28'; Leaburn (yellow card) 84'; Hylton (yellow card) 90'; Godden 90+7' (pen.)	Report	Coventry 16' (o.g.); Rathbone (yellow card) 53'; McClean (yellow card) 66'; Scarr (yellow card) 68'; Cannon 72'; Revan (yellow card) 90+5'	Stadium: The Valley; Attendance: 24,692; Referee: Sam Purkiss

9 November 2024 15	Wrexham	1–0	Mansfield Town	Wrexham
12:30 GMT	Barnett 6'; Palmer (yellow card) 45+2'; Scarr (yellow card) 90'	Report	Baccus (yellow card) 45'; Cargill (yellow card) 90+1'	Stadium: STōK Cae Ras; Attendance: 13,278; Referee: Simon Mather
Note: Fixture was initially scheduled for a 15:00 kick-off, but was moved for live Sky Sports broadcast.

16 November 2024 16	Stockport County	1–0	Wrexham	Stockport
15:00 GMT	Southam-Hales (yellow card) 2'; Horsfall (yellow card) 6'; Barry (yellow card) 20' (goal) 24'; Olaofe (yellow card) 90+2'	Report	Cannon (yellow card) 45'; Lee (yellow card) 63'; Rathbone (yellow card) 79'	Stadium: Edgeley Park; Attendance: 10,327; Referee: Thomas Kirk

23 November 2024 17	Wrexham	3–0	Exeter City	Wrexham
15:00 GMT	Rathbone (yellow card) 4' (goal) 72' (McClean); Cleworth 7' (Lee); Palmer 25' (Barnett)	Report	Watts (yellow card) 40'; Aitchison (yellow card) 51'	Stadium: STōK Cae Ras; Attendance: 12,484; Referee: Stephen Martin

26 November 2024 11	Wrexham	1–0	Lincoln City	Wrexham
19:45 GMT	Brunt (yellow card) 11'; Darikwa 67' (o.g.)	Report		Stadium: STōK Cae Ras; Attendance: 11,786; Referee: Jacob Miles
Note: Fixture was originally scheduled for 12 October, but was postponed due to international call-ups in the Lincoln squad.

3 December 2024 18	Wrexham	1–0	Barnsley	Wrexham
19:45 GMT	McClean (yellow card) 72'; Dobson (yellow card) 75'; James (yellow card) 86'; Rathbone 90+2' (O'Connell)	Report	Russell (yellow card) 47'; O'Keeffe (yellow card) 72'; Connell (yellow card) 85'	Stadium: STōK Cae Ras; Attendance: 12,386; Referee: Ben Speedie

7 December 2024 19	Burton Albion	0–1	Wrexham	Burton upon Trent
15:00 GMT	Sraha (yellow card) 34'	Report	Lee 65'	Stadium: Pirelli Stadium; Attendance: 3,744; Referee: Zac Kennard-Kettle

14 December 2024 20	Wrexham	2–2	Cambridge United	Wrexham
15:00 GMT	Lee (yellow card) 2'; McClean 27' (Barnett) (yellow card) 41'; Fletcher 66' (Rathbone); Brunt (yellow card) 88'	Report	Kachunga 20' (Lavery) (yellow card) 44'; Nlundulu 89' (pen.); Smith (yellow card) 90+1'	Stadium: STōK Cae Ras; Attendance: 11,698; Referee: Scott Oldham

21 December 2024 21	Bristol Rovers	1–1	Wrexham	Bristol
12:30 GMT	Thomas (yellow card) 45+4'; Lindsay (yellow card) 57'; Omochere; Wilson (yellow card) 90+6'	Report	Lee 18' (James); Palmer (yellow card) 45+5'; O'Connell (yellow card) 48'; McClean (yellow card) 90+6'; Fletcher (yellow card) 90+6'	Stadium: Memorial Stadium; Attendance: 9,471; Referee: Lee Swabey
Note: Fixture was initially scheduled for a 15:00 kick-off, but was moved for live Sky Sports broadcast.

26 December 2024 22	Wrexham	2–1	Blackpool	Wrexham
15:00 GMT	Mullin 24' (Palmer); Fletcher 88' (pen.)	Report	Fletcher 3' (Husband); Husband (yellow card) 87'	Stadium: STōK Cae Ras; Attendance: 13,313; Referee: Ruebyn Romero

29 December 2024 23	Wrexham	2–1	Wigan Athletic	Wrexham
15:00 GMT	Barnett (yellow card) 61'; Fletcher 90+1' (McClean); McClean (yellow card) 90+2'	Report	Adeeko (yellow card) 27'; Aimson (yellow card) 77'; Hugill 79' (Thomas); Weir (yellow card) 85'	Stadium: STōK Cae Ras; Attendance: 13,332; Referee: Tom Nield

1 January 2025 24	Barnsley	2–1	Wrexham	Barnsley
15:00 GMT	Keillor-Dunn 11' (Phillips); Phillips 24' (Watters); McCarthy (yellow card) 82'; O'Keeffe (yellow card) 87'; Killip (yellow card) 90+6'	Report	Cleworth 80'	Stadium: Oakwell; Attendance: 15,248; Referee: Ben Toner

4 January 2025 25	Wrexham	1–0	Peterborough United	Wrexham
15:00 GMT	Fletcher 87' (Rathbone) (yellow card) 88'; Dobson (yellow card) 90+1'	Report	Fernandez (yellow card) 36'; Ihionvien (yellow card) 53'	Stadium: STōK Cae Ras; Attendance: 13,060; Referee: David Rock

16 January 2025 27	Shrewsbury Town	2–1	Wrexham	Shrewsbury
20:00 GMT	Marquis (penalty missed) 48', 48'; Feeney (yellow card) 45+2'; Casteldine (yellow card) 57'; Lloyd (yellow card) 65'; Hoole (yellow card) 84'	Report	Fletcher 23' (Barnett); Rathbone (yellow card) 75'; McClean (yellow card) 90+8'	Stadium: The Croud Meadow; Attendance: 8,789; Referee: Simon Mather
Note: Fixture was initially scheduled for a 15:00 kick-off, but was moved for live Sky Sports broadcasting.

23 January 2025 28	Wrexham	1–1	Birmingham City	Wrexham
20:00 GMT	Rathbone 9' (yellow card) 69'	Report	Dykes 18' (Leonard)	Stadium: STōK Cae Ras; Attendance: 13,237; Referee: William James Finnie
Note: Fixture was initially scheduled for 25 January, but was moved for live Sky Sports broadcasting.

28 January 2025 29	Wrexham	2–3	Stevenage	Wrexham
19:45 GMT	Mullin 55' (Scarr) (yellow card) 69'; Cleworth 90' (Lee)	Report	Kemp 13'; Reid 18' (Appéré); Young 71' (Kemp); Phillips (yellow card) 89'; Cooper (yellow card) 89'; Reid (yellow card) 90+1'	Stadium: STōK Cae Ras; Attendance: 10,670; Referee: Thomas Kirk

1 February 2025 30	Crawley Town	1–2	Wrexham	Crawley
15:00 GMT	Camará (yellow card) 44'; Ibrahim 90'	Report	James 2' (Rathbone); O'Connell (yellow card) 49'; Lee 90+5' (Longman)	Stadium: Broadfield Stadium; Attendance: 5,049; Referee: Paul Howard

15 February 2025 32	Northampton Town	0–2	Wrexham	Northampton
15:00 GMT	Perry (yellow card) 45'; McGeehan (yellow card) 86'	Report	Smith; Rathbone 22'; Cleworth (yellow card) 86'	Stadium: Sixfields Stadium; Attendance: 7,685; Referee: Tom Reeves
Note: Fixture was initially scheduled for a 15:00 kick-off, but was moved for live Sky Sports broadcasting.

18 February 2025 31	Wrexham	1–2	Leyton Orient	Wrexham
19:45 GMT	Rathbone 15' (McClean); Dobson (yellow card) 45+2'	Report	Kelman 30' (Pratley); Donley 50'; Abdulai (yellow card) 78'; Pratley (yellow card) 79' (yellow-red card) 87'; Sweeney (yellow card) 90+2'	Stadium: STōK Cae Ras; Attendance: 11,703; Referee: Darren Drysdale
Note: Fixture was initially scheduled for 8 February 2025, but was rescheduled to 18 February due to Leyton Orient's involvement in the Fourth Round of the FA Cup.

23 February 2025 33	Mansfield Town	1–2	Wrexham	Mansfield
15:00 GMT	Macdonald 16' (Baccus); Oshilaja (yellow card) 56'; Evans (yellow card) 68'; Flint (yellow card) 79'; Lewis (yellow card) 90'	Report	Macdonald 2' (o.g.); Cleworth	Stadium: Field Mill; Attendance: 8,122; Referee: Matthew Corlett
Note: Fixture was initially scheduled for 22 February, but was moved for live Sky Sports broadcasting.

1 March 2025 34	Wrexham	0–0	Bolton Wanderers	Wrexham
12:30 GMT	James (yellow card) 13'; Dobson (yellow card) 58'	Report	Osei-Tutu (yellow card) 68'; Dacres-Cogley (yellow card) 72'; Forrester (yellow card) 90+3'	Stadium: STōK Cae Ras; Attendance: 13,284; Referee: Declan Bourne

4 March 2025 35	Huddersfield Town	0–1	Wrexham	Huddersfield
19:45 GMT		Report	Cleworth (yellow card) 68'; Fletcher 73' (yellow card) 90+1'	Stadium: John Smith's Stadium; Attendance: 20,502; Referee: Farai Hallam

8 March 2025 36	Wrexham	1–0	Rotherham United	Wrexham
15:00 GMT	Smith 48' (Rodriguez)	Report	Wilks (yellow card) 81'	Stadium: STōK Cae Ras; Attendance: 13,245; Referee: Jeremy Simpson

11 March 2025 26	Reading	2–0	Wrexham	Reading
20:00 GMT	Stickland (yellow card) 48' (yellow-red card) 75'; Knibbs 51' (pen.); Wing 55' (Knibbs); Savage (yellow card) 90+6'	Report		Stadium: Select Car Leasing Stadium; Attendance: 11,557; Referee: Edward Duckworth
Note: Fixture was initially scheduled for a 15:00 kick-off, but was moved for live Sky Sports broadcasting. Match originally scheduled for 11 January, but postponed on 2 December due to Reading participating in the Third Round of the FA Cup that weekend.

15 March 2025 37	Wycombe Wanderers	0–1	Wrexham	High Wycombe
15:00 GMT		Report	Rathbone (yellow card) 37'; Smith 78' (Fletcher); O'Connor (yellow card) 90+5'	Stadium: Adams Park; Attendance: 9,333; Referee: Ben Speedie

22 March 2025 38	Wrexham	1–0	Stockport County	Wrexham
15:00 GMT	Dobson (yellow card) 14'; Rodriguez (penalty missed) 29', 29'; McClean (yellow card) 31'; O'Connell (yellow card) 56'; Smith (yellow card) 81'; Fletcher (yellow card) 87'; Okonkwo (yellow card) 88'	Report	Hills (yellow card) 24' (yellow-red card) 80'; Knoyle (yellow card) 90'	Stadium: STōK Cae Ras; Attendance: 13,317; Referee: Simon Mather

29 March 2025 39	Exeter City	0–2	Wrexham	Exeter
15:00 GMT	Cole (yellow card) 87'	Report	Rathbone 23' (McClean); Rodriguez 60' (pen.)	Stadium: St James Park; Attendance: 8,084; Referee: Alex Chilowicz (United States)

1 April 2025 40	Cambridge United	2–2	Wrexham	Cambridge
19:45 BST	Bennett (yellow card) 24' (goal) 40'; Loft (yellow card) 39'; Stokes 47' (pen.)	Report	Dobson 4'; Cleworth (yellow card) 7'; Smith 57' (Longman) (yellow card) 89'	Stadium: Abbey Stadium; Attendance: 6,071; Referee: Thomas Parsons

5 April 2025 41	Wrexham	3–0	Burton Albion	Wrexham
12:30 BST	Rathbone (yellow card) 33'; Fletcher 71' (pen.); Smith 73' (Longman); Marriott 87' (Barnett)	Report	Webster (red card) 10'; Dodgson (yellow card) 49'; Crocombe (yellow card) 90'	Stadium: STōK Cae Ras; Attendance: 12,829; Referee: Seb Stockbridge
Note: Fixture was initially scheduled for a 15:00 kick-off, but was moved for live Sky Sports broadcasting.

12 April 2025 42	Wigan Athletic	0–0	Wrexham	Wigan
12:30 BST	Robinson (yellow card) 86'	Report		Stadium: Brick Community Stadium; Attendance: 14,819; Referee: Adam Herczeg
Note: Fixture was initially scheduled for a 15:00 kick-off, but was moved for live Sky Sports broadcasting.

18 April 2025 43	Wrexham	1–1	Bristol Rovers	Wrexham
15:00 BST	James 76'	Report	Moore 32' (Butcher); Thomas (yellow card) 49'; Forde (yellow card) 74'	Stadium: STōK Cae Ras; Attendance: 12,740; Referee: Martin Coy

21 April 2025 44	Blackpool	1–2	Wrexham	Blackpool
15:00 BST	Silvera (yellow card) 54'; Apter 90+5'	Report	Dobson (yellow card) 20'; McClean; Rathbone 64' (Rodriguez); Fletcher (yellow card) 83'	Stadium: Bloomfield Road; Attendance: 12,266; Referee: Darren Drysdale

26 April 2025 45	Wrexham	3–0	Charlton Athletic	Wrexham
17:30 BST	Rathbone 15' (James); Smith 16' (James), 81' (Cleworth) (yellow card) 65'; Longman (yellow card) 45'	Report	Campbell (yellow card) 42'	Stadium: STōK Cae Ras; Attendance: 12,774; Referee: Ben Toner
Note: Fixture was initially scheduled for a 15:00 kick-off, but was moved for live Sky Sports broadcasting.

3 May 2025 46	Lincoln City	0–2	Wrexham	Lincoln
15:00 BST	Hackett (yellow card) 73'	Report	Lee 53' (Longman); Longman 61' (McClean) (yellow card) 62'; McClean (yellow card) 65'	Stadium: Sincil Bank; Attendance: 10,347; Referee: Thomas Kirk

=== FA Cup ===
Win Draw Loss Fixtures

3 November 2024 First round	Harrogate Town	1–0	Wrexham	Harrogate
15:30 GMT	Muldoon 24' (Duke-McKenna); March (yellow card) 61'	Report	Dobson (yellow card) 67'; McClean (yellow card) 74'; Mullin (yellow card) 88'	Stadium: Exercise Stadium; Attendance: 3,893; Referee: Edward Duckworth

=== EFL Cup ===
Win Draw Loss Fixtures

13 August 2024 First round	Sheffield United	4–2	Wrexham	Sheffield
20:00 BST	Trusty 35' (Peck); Brunt 57' (o.g.); Brewster (penalty missed) '69; Marsh 69'; Slimane 85'; Peck (yellow card) 90+4'	Report	Boyle 29' (Scarr); McClean (yellow card) 42'; Revan 90+3' (Lee); Marriott (yellow card) 90+5'	Stadium: Bramall Lane; Attendance: 11,446; Referee: Keith Stroud

=== EFL Trophy ===
Pos	Div	Team	Pld	W	PW	PL	L	GF	GA	GD	Pts	Qualification
1	L1	Wrexham	3	2	0	1	0	6	2	+4	7	Advance to Round 2
2	L2	Port Vale	3	1	2	0	0	5	3	+2	7	Advance to Round 2
3	L2	Salford City	3	1	0	0	2	4	6	−2	3	
4	ACA	Wolverhampton Wanderers U21	3	0	0	1	2	4	8	−4	1	

Source: EFL

Win Draw Loss Fixtures

==== Group stage ====
10 September 2024 Group stage	Wrexham	2–1	Salford City	Wrexham
19:45 BST	Mullin 18' (Revan); Faal (yellow card) 25'; Bolton (yellow card) 35'; Austerfield 83' (o.g.)	Report	McAleny 52' (Adelakun); Taylor (yellow card) 55'	Stadium: STōK Cae Ras; Attendance: 6,640; Referee: Dale Baines

8 October 2024 Group stage	Wrexham	3–0	Wolverhampton Wanderers U21	Wrexham
19:45 BST	Brunt 22' (Forde); Mullin 38' (Forde); Faal 57'	Report		Stadium: STōK Cae Ras; Attendance: 3,987; Referee: Elliot Bell

12 November 2024 Group stage	Port Vale	1–1 (3–1 p)	Wrexham	Burslem
19:45 GMT	Richards 82'	Report	Cleworth 51' (Böðvarsson)	Stadium: Vale Park; Attendance: 1,837; Referee: Steven Copeland
	Penalties
	Tolaj (penalty scored); Lowe (penalty scored); Grant (penalty scored); Richards (penalty missed)		(penalty scored) Mullin; (penalty missed) Forde; (penalty missed) Revan; (penalty missed) Rathbone

==== Knockout stages ====
10 December 2024 Round of 32	Wrexham	1–0	Crewe Alexandra	Wrexham
19:30 GMT	James 79' (Mullin)	Report	Connolly (yellow card) 67'	Stadium: STōK Cae Ras; Attendance: 3,119; Referee: Martin Woods

4 February 2025 Round of 16	Port Vale	1–4	Wrexham	Burslem
19:00 GMT	Curtis 1'	Report	O'Connor (yellow card) 21'; Cannon 31' (Faal); Ashfield (yellow card) 45+2' (goal) 48' (Longman); Lee 63' (Longman); Faal 82' (Revan)	Stadium: Vale Park; Attendance: 1,621; Referee: Ben Toner
Note: Fixture was originally scheduled for 7 January, but was postponed following consultation with the local Safety Advisory Group.

11 February 2025 Quarter-finals	Wrexham	1–0	Bolton Wanderers	Wrexham
19:30 GMT	Cannon (yellow card) 42'	Report	Sheehan (yellow card) 30'; Dacres-Cogley (yellow card) 68'; Collins (yellow card) 78'; Johnston (yellow card) 90+2'	Stadium: STōK Cae Ras; Attendance: 7,591; Referee: Ross Joyce

26 February 2025 Semi-finals	Wrexham	2–2 (2–4 p)	Peterborough United	Wrexham
19:30 GMT	Faal 34' (Cleworth); Dobson 38' (Marriott)	Report	Wallin (yellow card) 68'; Mothersille (penalty missed) '72 72'; Ihionvien 90+1' (yellow card) 90+2'	Stadium: STōK Cae Ras; Attendance: 9,258; Referee: Lewis Smith
	Penalties
	Mullin (penalty missed); Fletcher (penalty scored); Lee (penalty missed); Mendy (penalty scored)		(penalty scored) Ihionvien; (penalty missed) Mothersille; (penalty scored) De Havilland; (penalty scored) Mills; (penalty scored) Kyprianou

== Statistics ==
As of 3 May 2025 – Season Complete

=== Appearances and goals ===
Italics indicate a loaned in player

No.	Pos	Nat	Player	Total		League One		FA Cup		EFL Cup		EFL Trophy	
No.	Pos	Nat	Player	Apps	Goals	Apps	Goals	Apps	Goals	Apps	Goals	Apps	Goals
1	GK	(England) ENG	Arthur Okonkwo	37	0	33+0	0	1+0	0	0+0	0	3+0	0
3	DF	(England) ENG	Lewis Brunt	29	1	21+1	0	0+0	0	1+0	0	5+1	1
4	DF	(England) ENG	Max Cleworth	48	8	42+0	7	1+0	0	0+0	0	3+2	1
5	DF	(Republic of Ireland) IRL	Eoghan O'Connell	41	0	38+1	0	1+0	0	0+0	0	0+1	0
6	DF	(Republic of Ireland) IRL	Thomas O'Connor	35	0	25+6	0	1+0	0	0+0	0	3+0	0
7	DF	(Republic of Ireland) IRL	James McClean	44	4	38+3	4	0+1	0	1+0	0	0+1	0
8	MF	(England) ENG	Andy Cannon	28	4	17+7	2	1+0	0	0+0	0	2+1	2
9	FW	(England) ENG	Ollie Palmer	31	3	26+1	3	1+0	0	0+0	0	0+3	0
10	FW	(England) ENG	Paul Mullin	32	4	9+17	2	1+0	0	0+0	0	2+3	2
11	FW	(England) ENG	Jack Marriott	29	6	9+16	6	0+0	0	0+1	0	2+1	0
12	MF	(England) ENG	George Evans	10	0	1+5	0	0+0	0	1+0	0	3+0	0
13	GK	(England) ENG	Callum Burton	8	0	4+0	0	0+0	0	1+0	0	3+0	0
15	MF	(England) ENG	George Dobson	48	2	38+4	1	1+0	0	0+1	0	2+2	1
16	FW	(England) ENG	Jay Rodriguez	18	2	17+0	2	0+0	0	0+0	0	0+1	0
17	DF	(England) ENG	Luke Bolton	3	0	0+0	0	0+0	0	1+0	0	2+0	0
19	DF	(The Gambia) GAM	Jacob Mendy	8	0	1+2	0	0+0	0	0+0	0	4+1	0
20	MF	(England) ENG	Oliver Rathbone	48	9	34+7	9	1+0	0	1+0	0	1+4	0
21	GK	(England) ENG	Mark Howard	11	0	9+1	0	0+0	0	0+0	0	0+1	0
22	FW	(The Gambia) GAM	Modou Faal	16	3	0+8	0	0+1	0	0+0	0	7+0	3
23	DF	(England) ENG	Sebastian Revan	25	1	9+8	0	1+0	0	1+0	1	4+2	0
24	DF	(England) ENG	Dan Scarr	20	0	12+2	0	0+0	0	1+0	0	5+0	0
25	DF	(England) ENG	Will Boyle	3	1	0+0	0	0+0	0	1+0	1	2+0	0
26	FW	(Scotland) SCO	Steven Fletcher	43	8	2+38	8	0+0	0	0+1	0	0+2	0
28	FW	(England) ENG	Sam Smith	19	7	18+0	7	0+0	0	0+0	0	0+1	0
29	MF	(England) ENG	Ryan Barnett	45	2	31+9	2	1+0	0	0+1	0	1+2	0
32	GK	(England) ENG	Brad Foster	1	0	0+0	0	0+0	0	0+0	0	1+0	0
33	MF	(Scotland) SCO	Josh Adam	2	0	0+0	0	0+0	0	0+0	0	2+0	0
34	DF	(England) ENG	Aaron James	3	1	0+0	0	0+0	0	0+0	0	3+0	1
37	MF	(England) ENG	Matty James	34	2	30+2	2	0+0	0	0+1	0	1+0	0
38	MF	(England) ENG	Elliot Lee	44	9	26+12	8	0+1	0	0+1	0	2+2	1
45	MF	(England) ENG	Harry Ashfield	5	1	0+0	0	0+0	0	0+0	0	3+2	1
47	MF	(England) ENG	Ryan Longman	21	1	14+5	1	0+0	0	0+0	0	2+0	0
Players away on loan:
18	FW	(England) ENG	Sam Dalby	1	0	0+0	0	0+0	0	1+0	0	0+0	0
Players who left Wrexham during the season:
14	MF	(Republic of Ireland) IRL	Anthony Forde	4	0	0+0	0	0+0	0	0+0	0	4+0	0
28	FW	(Iceland) ISL	Jón Daði Böðvarsson	7	0	1+3	0	0+1	0	0+0	0	2+0	0
30	MF	(Scotland) SCO	James Jones	6	0	0+2	0	0+0	0	1+0	0	3+0	0

=== Goal scorers ===
Place	Position	Nation	Number	Name	League One	FA Cup	EFL Cup	EFL Trophy	Total
1	MF	(England)	38	Elliot Lee	8	0	0	1	9
1	MF	(England)	20	Oliver Rathbone	8	0	0	0	8
3	DF	(England)	4	Max Cleworth	7	0	0	1	8
3	FW	(Scotland)	26	Steven Fletcher	8	0	0	0	8
5	FW	(England)	28	Sam Smith	7	0	0	0	7
6	FW	(England)	11	Jack Marriott	6	0	0	0	6
7	FW	(England)	10	Paul Mullin	2	0	0	2	4
7	MF	(England)	8	Andy Cannon	2	0	0	2	4
7	DF	(Republic of Ireland)	7	James McClean	4	0	0	0	4
10	FW	(England)	9	Ollie Palmer	3	0	0	0	3
10	FW	(The Gambia)	11	Modou Faal	0	0	0	3	3
12	MF	(England)	29	Ryan Barnett	2	0	0	0	2
12	FW	(England)	16	Jay Rodriguez	2	0	0	0	2
12	MF	(England)	15	George Dobson	1	0	0	1	2
12	MF	(England)	37	Matty James	2	0	0	0	2
16	DF	(England)	25	Will Boyle	0	0	1	0	1
16	DF	(England)	23	Sebastian Revan	0	0	1	0	1
16	DF	(England)	3	Lewis Brunt	0	0	0	1	1
16	DF	(England)	34	Aaron James	0	0	0	1	1
16	MF	(England)	45	Harry Ashfield	0	0	0	1	1
16	MF	(England)	47	Ryan Longman	1	0	0	0	1
Opponent's own goal(s)					3	0	0	1	4
Total					67	0	2	14	83

=== Assists ===
Place	Position	Nation	Number	Name	League One	FA Cup	EFL Cup	EFL Trophy	Total
1	MF	(England)	29	Ryan Barnett	9	0	0	0	9
2	DF	(Republic of Ireland)	7	James McClean	7	0	0	0	7
3	MF	(England)	15	George Dobson	5	0	0	0	5
3	MF	(England)	47	Ryan Longman	3	0	0	2	5
5	MF	(England)	38	Elliot Lee	3	0	1	0	4
6	MF	(England)	20	Oliver Rathbone	3	0	0	0	3
6	DF	(England)	4	Max Cleworth	2	0	0	1	3
6	MF	(England)	37	Matty James	3	0	0	0	3
9	DF	(Republic of Ireland)	5	Eoghan O'Connell	2	0	0	0	2
9	FW	(England)	9	Ollie Palmer	2	0	0	0	2
9	DF	(England)	23	Sebastian Revan	0	0	0	2	2
9	FW	(England)	16	Jay Rodriguez	2	0	0	0	2
13	DF	(England)	24	Dan Scarr	0	0	1	0	1
13	MF	(Republic of Ireland)	6	Thomas O'Connor	1	0	0	0	1
13	FW	(England)	10	Paul Mullin	0	0	0	1	1
13	FW	(The Gambia)	22	Modou Faal	0	0	0	1	1
13	MF	(England)	12	George Evans	0	0	0	1	1
13	GK	(England)	21	Mark Howard	1	0	0	0	1
13	FW	(England)	11	Jack Marriott	0	0	0	1	1
13	FW	(Scotland)	26	Steven Fletcher	1	0	0	0	1
Players who left Wrexham during the season:
	FW	(Iceland)	28	Jón Daði Böðvarsson	0	0	0	1	1
	MF	(Republic of Ireland)	14	Anthony Forde	0	0	0	2	2
Total					44	0	2	12	57

=== Clean sheets ===
Place	Position	Nation	Number	Name	League One	FA Cup	EFL Cup	EFL Trophy	Total
1	GK	(England)	1	Arthur Okonkwo	17	0	0	1	18
2	GK	(England)	13	Callum Burton	1	0	0	1	2
2	GK	(England)	21	Mark Howard	2	0	0	0	2
4	GK	(England)	–	Shared	1	0	0	0	1
4	GK	(England)	32	Brad Foster	0	0	0	1	1
Total					21	0	0	3	24

=== Hat-tricks ===
Player	Against	Result	Date	Competition	Ref

=== Disciplinary record ===
Number	Nation	Position	Name	League One			FA Cup			EFL Cup			EFL Trophy			Total		
Number	Nation	Position	Name	Yellow card	(yellow card) (yellow-red card)	Red card	Yellow card	(yellow card) (yellow-red card)	Red card	Yellow card	(yellow card) (yellow-red card)	Red card	Yellow card	(yellow card) (yellow-red card)	Red card	Yellow card	(yellow card) (yellow-red card)	Red card
1	(England)	GK	Arthur Okonkwo	1	0	0	0	0	0	0	0	0	0	0	0	1	0	0
3	(England)	DF	Lewis Brunt	2	0	0	0	0	0	0	0	0	0	0	0	2	0	0
4	(Wales)	DF	Max Cleworth	3	0	0	0	0	0	0	0	0	0	0	0	3	0	0
5	(Republic of Ireland)	DF	Eoghan O'Connell	6	0	0	0	0	0	0	0	0	0	0	0	6	0	0
6	(Republic of Ireland)	MF	Thomas O'Connor	3	0	0	0	0	0	0	0	0	1	0	0	4	0	0
7	(Republic of Ireland)	MF	James McClean	11	0	0	1	0	0	1	0	0	0	0	0	13	0	0
8	(England)	MF	Andy Cannon	5	0	0	0	0	0	0	0	0	1	0	0	6	0	0
9	(England)	FW	Ollie Palmer	4	0	0	0	0	0	0	0	0	0	0	0	4	0	0
10	(England)	FW	Paul Mullin	3	0	0	1	0	0	0	0	0	0	0	0	4	0	0
11	(England)	FW	Jack Marriott	0	0	0	0	0	0	1	0	0	0	0	0	1	0	0
15	(England)	DF	George Dobson	10	0	0	1	0	0	0	0	0	0	0	0	11	0	0
17	(England)	DF	Luke Bolton	0	0	0	0	0	0	0	0	0	1	0	0	1	0	0
20	(England)	MF	Oliver Rathbone	8	0	0	0	0	0	0	0	0	0	0	0	8	0	0
22	(The Gambia)	FW	Modou Faal	0	0	0	0	0	0	0	0	0	1	0	0	1	0	0
23	(England)	MF	Sebastian Revan	1	0	0	0	0	0	0	0	0	0	0	0	1	0	0
24	(England)	DF	Dan Scarr	3	0	0	0	0	0	0	0	0	0	0	0	3	0	0
26	(Scotland)	FW	Steven Fletcher	5	0	0	0	0	0	0	0	0	0	0	0	5	0	0
28	(England)	FW	Sam Smith	3	0	0	0	0	0	0	0	0	0	0	0	3	0	0
29	(England)	MF	Ryan Barnett	1	0	0	0	0	0	0	0	0	0	0	0	1	0	0
37	(England)	MF	Matty James	2	0	0	0	0	0	0	0	0	0	0	0	2	0	0
38	(England)	MF	Elliot Lee	3	0	0	0	0	0	0	0	0	0	0	0	3	0	0
45	(England)	MF	Harry Ashfield	0	0	0	0	0	0	0	0	0	1	0	0	1	0	0
47	(England)	MF	Ryan Longman	2	0	0	0	0	0	0	0	0	0	0	0	2	0	0
Total				76	0	0	3	0	0	2	0	0	5	0	0	86	0	0

== Club awards ==
On 29 April 2025, supporters can vote for Player of the Season and Young Player of the Season on Wrexham AFC website. On 9 May 2025, awards are given at STōK Cae Ras.

Name	Award
(England) Oliver Rathbone	Player of the Season
(England) Max Cleworth	Young Player
(England) Max Cleworth	Players' Player
(England) Elliot Lee	Top Goalscorer
(England) Paul Mullin	Steve Edwards Goal of the Season
Alex Moore	Bob Clark Academy Player of the Year
Geraint Parry	Lifetime Achievement Award

== Home attendance ==
Competition	Total	Games	Average
League One	293,963	23	12,781
FA Cup	0	0	0
EFL Cup	0	0	0
EFL Trophy	30,595	5	6,119
Total	324,558	28	11,591
