= Harry Ashfield =

Welsh footballer (born 2006)

Personal information
- Date of birth: 23 March 2006 (age 20)
- Place of birth: Wrexham, Wales
- Height: 6 ft 0 in (1.84 m)
- Position: Midfielder

Team information
- Current team: Peterborough United
- Number: 45

Youth career
- 2015–2023: Wrexham

Senior career*
Years	Team	Apps	(Gls)
2023–2026	Wrexham	1	(0)
2026	→ Cheltenham Town (loan)	17	(2)
2026–	Peterborough United	10	(1)
- * Club domestic league appearances and goals as of 17:05, 21 November 2026 (UTC)

Harry Ashfield (born 23 March 2006) is a Welsh professional footballer who plays as a midfielder for EFL League One club Peterborough United.

== Youth career ==
Ashfield signed for Wrexham's youth side in 2015. In 2024, he won the Bob Clark Wrexham Academy player of the season award.

== Career ==
On 10 October 2023, Ashfield made his Wrexham debut in the 2023–24 EFL Trophy, coming on as a substitute in Wrexham's 3–0 win at Crewe Alexandra. He also made an appearance in the 2024–25 EFL Trophy, again coming on as a substitute, in a 2–1 win against Salford City on 10 September 2024. He scored his first senior goal in the round of 16 of the same competition, the second goal in a 1–4 win at Port Vale on 4 February 2025.

He made his football league debut on 1 January 2026, as a second-half substitute for Ollie Rathbone in a 0–2 away win at Blackburn Rovers in the EFL Championship.

On 2 February 2026 Ashfield joined EFL League Two club Cheltenham Town on loan for the remainder of the 2025-26 season. He made his debut for Cheltenham on 7 February 2026 in the EFL League Two 3-2 defeat to Milton Keynes Dons.

On 1 September 2026, Ashfield signed for Peterborough United for an undisclosed fee on a three year deal with an option for a further year.

== International ==
Ashfield was called up to the Wales under-21 squad for the first time in March 2026.

== Career statistics ==
As of match played 26 September 2026

Appearances and goals by club, season and competition
Club	Season	League			FA Cup		EFL Cup		Other		Total	
Club	Season	Division	Apps	Goals	Apps	Goals	Apps	Goals	Apps	Goals	Apps	Goals
Wrexham	2023–24	League Two	0	0	0	0	0	0	1 (Note: Appearance(s) in EFL Trophy)	0	1	0
Wrexham	2024–25	League One	0	0	0	0	0	0	5	1	5	1
Wrexham	2025–26	Championship	1	0	0	0	2	1	–		3	1
Wrexham	Total		1	0	0	0	2	1	6	1	9	2
Cheltenham Town (loan)	2025–26	League Two	17	2	0	0	0	0	0	0	17	2
Peterborough United	2026–27	League One	4	0	0	0	1	0	1	2	6	2
Career total			22	2	0	0	3	1	7	3	32	6
