= Brad Foster (footballer) =

English footballer (born 2006)

Personal information
- Full name: Bradley Foster
- Date of birth: 5 October 2001 (age 25)
- Place of birth: Stafford, England
- Height: 6 ft 5 in (1.96 m)
- Position: Goalkeeper

Team information
- Current team: Ross County
- Number: 1

Youth career
- 201?–2018: Stoke City
- 2018–2021: Derby County

Senior career*
Years	Team	Apps	(Gls)
2021	Ilkeston Town	1	(0)
2021–2022	Nuneaton Borough	2	(0)
2022–2024	West Bromwich Albion	0	(0)
2023	→ Rushall Olympic (loan)	4	(0)
2023–2024	→ Alvechurch (loan)	10	(0)
2024–2025	Wrexham	0	(0)
2025–	Ross County	11	(0)
- * Club domestic league appearances and goals as of 19 October 2026

Bradley Foster (born 5 October 2001) is an English professional footballer who plays as a goalkeeper for Scottish League One club Ross County.

Foster played youth team football for Stoke City and Derby County. He played non-League football at Ilkeston Town and Nuneaton Borough, before he was signed to West Bromwich Albion to feature for the under-21 side. He played on loan at Rushall Olympic and Alvechurch. He had a short-term contract with Wrexham in December 2024 until June 2025. He joined Ross County in July 2025.

== Career ==
=== Early career ===
As a youth footballer, Foster spent time on the books at Stoke City and Derby County. He played under Darren Wassall as a second year scholar at Derby before being moved to the under-23 squad at the end of the 2019–20 Academy season. He played six games in the club's UEFA Youth League run in 2019–20.

After being released from Derby at the end of the 2020–21 season, Foster signed for Ilkeston of the Northern Premier League Division One Midlands on 3 October 2021. On 21 November 2021, he joined Nuneaton Borough in the Southern League Premier Division Central.

=== West Bromwich Albion ===
Foster joined West Bromwich Albion and was in goal as Richard Beale's under-21 side reached the semi-finals of the Birmingham Senior Cup in 2023. He played for the Baggies in Premier League 2. On 11 August 2023, he joined National League North club Rushall Olympic on a one-month loan. He signed a one-year contract with West Brom in August 2023. On 5 October 2023, he joined Southern League Premier Division Central side Alvechurch on a 28-day loan. The loan was extended until 28 January after he kept two clean sheets in four games for the Cherries. He departed The Hawthorns at the end of the 2023–24 season.

=== Wrexham ===
On 7 December 2024, Foster signed with EFL League One club Wrexham on a short-term deal following injuries to Arthur Okonkwo and Callum Burton, with manager Phil Parkinson feeling that youth goalkeeper Liam Hall was too inexperienced. He made his debut for the Red Dragons three days later, in an EFL Trophy match against Crewe Alexandra, keeping a clean sheet in a 1–0 win at the Racecourse Ground and being voted as man of the match by Wrexham fans. He then signed a contract to run until the end of the 2024–25 season, with the option of an additional year. He departed the club upon the expiration of his contract as Parkinson could only name a 25-man squad in the Championship.

=== Ross County ===
Foster began training with Port Vale in June 2025. On 3 July, he signed with Scottish Championship club Ross County.

== Career statistics ==
As of match played 17 October 2026

Appearances and goals by club, season and competition
Club	Season	League			National cup		League cup		Other		Total	
Club	Season	Division	Apps	Goals	Apps	Goals	Apps	Goals	Apps	Goals	Apps	Goals
Ilkeston Town	2021–22	Northern Premier League; Division One Midlands	1	0	0	0	—		1 (Note: Appearance(s) in FA Trophy)	0	2	0
Nuneaton Borough	2021–22	Southern League; Premier Division Central	2	0	0	0	—		0	0	2	0
Rushall Olympic (loan)	2023–24	National League North	4	0	0	0	—		0	0	4	0
Alvechurch (loan)	2023–24	Southern League; Premier Division Central	10	0	0	0	—		3 (Note: 2 appearances in FA Trophy and 1 appearance in Worcestershire Senior Cup)	0	13	0
Wrexham	2024–25	League One	0	0	—		—		1 (Note: Appearance(s) in EFL Trophy)	0	1	0
Ross County	2025–26	Scottish Championship	1	0	0	0	2	0	2 (Note: Appearances in the Scottish Challenge Cup)	0	5	0
Ross County	2026–27	Scottish League One	10	0	0	0	6	0	2	0	18	0
Ross County	Total		11	0	0	0	8	0	4	0	23	0
Career total			28	0	0	0	8	0	9	0	45	0
