= Luke McNicholas =

Irish footballer (born 2001)

Personal information
- Full name: Luke Christopher McNicholas
- Date of birth: 1 January 2000 (age 26)
- Place of birth: Belcarra, County Mayo, Ireland
- Height: 1.92 m (6 ft 4 in)
- Position: Goalkeeper

Team information
- Current team: Forest Green Rovers
- Number: 12

Youth career
- Manulla
- Sligo Rovers

Senior career*
Years	Team	Apps	(Gls)
2019–2024	Sligo Rovers	38	(0)
2021	→ Finn Harps (loan)	0	(0)
2021–2022	→ Cliftonville (loan)	24	(0)
2023–2024	→ Wrexham (loan)	0	(0)
2024–2025	Wrexham	0	(0)
2024–2025	→ Rochdale (loan)	9	(0)
2025–	Forest Green Rovers	0	(0)

International career
2018	Republic of Ireland U19	1	(0)
- * Club domestic league appearances and goals as of 12 January 2025

Luke Christopher McNicholas (born 1 January 2000) is an Irish professional footballer who plays as a goalkeeper for National League club Forest Green Rovers.

== Career ==
McNicholas began his career at Mayo soccer team Manulla.

McNicholas began his professional career at Sligo Rovers, but was loaned out to fellow League of Ireland Premier Division side Finn Harps where he didn't make a single appearance, however, upon return he got his chance due to injury to Sligo Rovers keeper Edward McGinty.

On 17 August 2021, he was loaned out to NIFL Premiership club Cliftonville. During his time there, Cliftonville won the Northern Ireland Football League Cup and came runners up in the NIFL Premiership.

On 11 August 2023, after establishing himself as Sligo Rovers' number 1, McNicholas would join newly promoted EFL League Two side Wrexham on a short-term loan, with the option for Wrexham to buy in January 2024. He made his debut for the club on 10 October 2023, keeping a clean sheet in a 0–3 away win at Crewe Alexandra in the EFL Trophy. On 23 January 2024, Wrexham announced that they had signed McNicholas on a permanent deal, joining on a two-and-a-half-year deal.

On 15 July 2024, McNicholas joined Rochdale on a season-long loan. He was recalled on 1 February 2025, after injuries disrupted his loan spell.

On 3 July 2025, McNicholas joined National League club Forest Green Rovers on a permanent deal.

== Career statistics ==
As of match played on 9 November 2024

Appearances and goals by club, season and competition
Club	Season	League			National Cup (Note: Includes FAI Cup, Irish Cup & FA Cup)		League cup (Note: Includes League of Ireland Cup, Northern Ireland Football League Cup, EFL Cup & National League Cup)		Other		Total	
Club	Season	Division	Apps	Goals	Apps	Goals	Apps	Goals	Apps	Goals	Apps	Goals
Sligo Rovers	2019	LOI Premier Division	2	0	0	0	1	0	—		3	0
Sligo Rovers	2020	LOI Premier Division	0	0	0	0	—		—		0	0
Sligo Rovers	2021	LOI Premier Division	2	0	1	0	—		2 (Note: Appearance(s) in UEFA Europa Conference League)	0	5	0
Sligo Rovers	2022	LOI Premier Division	8	0	1	0	—		4	0	13	0
Sligo Rovers	2023	LOI Premier Division	26	0	1	0	—		—		27	0
Sligo Rovers	Total		38	0	3	0	1	0	6	0	48	0
Finn Harps (loan)	2021	LOI Premier Division	0	0	—		—		—		0	0
Cliftonville (loan)	2021–22	NIFL Premiership	24	0	4	0	3	0	—		31	0
Wrexham (loan)	2023–24	League Two	0	0	0	0	0	0	3 (Note: Appearance(s) in the EFL Trophy)	0	3	0
Wrexham	2023–24	League Two	0	0	0	0	—		—		0	0
Wrexham	2024–25	League One	0	0	—		—		0	0	0	0
Wrexham	Total		0	0	0	0	0	0	0	0	0	0
Rochdale (loan)	2024–25	National League	9	0	0	0	0	0	—		9	0
Forest Green Rovers	2025–26	National League	0	0	0	0	0	0	0	0	0	0
Career total			74	0	7	0	4	0	6	0	91	0

== Honours ==
Cliftonville

- Northern Ireland Football League Cup: 2021–22
- NIFL Premiership runner-up: 2021–22

Wrexham

- EFL League Two runner-up: 2023–24
- EFL League One runner-up: 2024–25
