= Josh Adam =

English footballer (born 2004)

Personal information
- Date of birth: 3 February 2004 (age 22)
- Place of birth: Glasgow, Scotland
- Position: Midfielder

Team information
- Current team: Bohemians
- Number: 21

Youth career
- Celtic
- 2020–2024: Manchester City

Senior career*
Years	Team	Apps	(Gls)
2024–2025	Wrexham	0	(0)
2025–2026	Dynamo České Budějovice	22	(1)
2026–	Bohemians	0	(0)

International career^{‡}
2018–2019	Scotland U16	7	(1)
2022	Scotland U19	5	(2)
2023	Scotland U21	2	(0)
- * Club domestic league appearances and goals as of 28 May 2026 ‡ National team caps and goals as of 19:51, 2 August 2025 (UTC)

Josh Adam (born 3 February 2004) is a Scottish professional footballer who plays as a midfielder for League of Ireland Premier Division side Bohemians.

== Career ==
Adam made 99 appearances at Under-18, Under-21 and UEFA Youth League level for the Academy at Manchester City, picking up 18 goals and 12 assists. He won two Under-18 Premier League titles and two Premier League 2 titles. He was released, however, upon the expiry of his contract in May 2024.

=== Wrexham ===
On 10 September 2024, after impressing manager Phil Parkinson on trial, Adam signed a contract with Wrexham to run until the end of the 2024–25 season with an option for an extra year. He was released at the end of the season after only two appearances in the EFL Trophy.

=== Dynamo České Budějovice ===
On 1 August 2025, Adam signed for Czech 2nd tier side Dynamo České Budějovice.

=== Bohemians ===
On 3 August 2026, Adam signed for League of Ireland Premier Division club Bohemians on a short term deal. On 16 August 2026, Adam made his debut for the club, replacing Ross Tierney from the bench in the 63rd minute of a 4–0 win over Longford Town in the FAI Cup.

== Career statistics ==
As of match played 16 August 2026

Appearances and goals by club, season and competition
Club	Season	League			National Cup (Note: Includes FA Cup, Magyar Kupa & FAI Cup)		League Cup (Note: Includes EFL Cup)		Other		Total	
Club	Season	Division	Apps	Goals	Apps	Goals	Apps	Goals	Apps	Goals	Apps	Goals
Manchester City U21	2022–23	—	—		—		—		1 (Note: Appearance(s) in the EFL Trophy)	0	1	0
Manchester City U21	2023–24	—	—		—		—		2	0	2	0
Manchester City U21	Total		0	0	0	0	0	0	3	0	3	0
Wrexham	2024–25	EFL League One	0	0	0	0	0	0	2	0	2	0
Dynamo České Budějovice	2025–26	Czech National Football League	22	1	2	0	–		–		24	1
Bohemians	2026	League of Ireland Premier Division	0	0	1	0	–		0	0	1	0
Career total			22	1	3	0	0	0	5	0	30	1
