= George Dobson (footballer, born 1997) =

English footballer

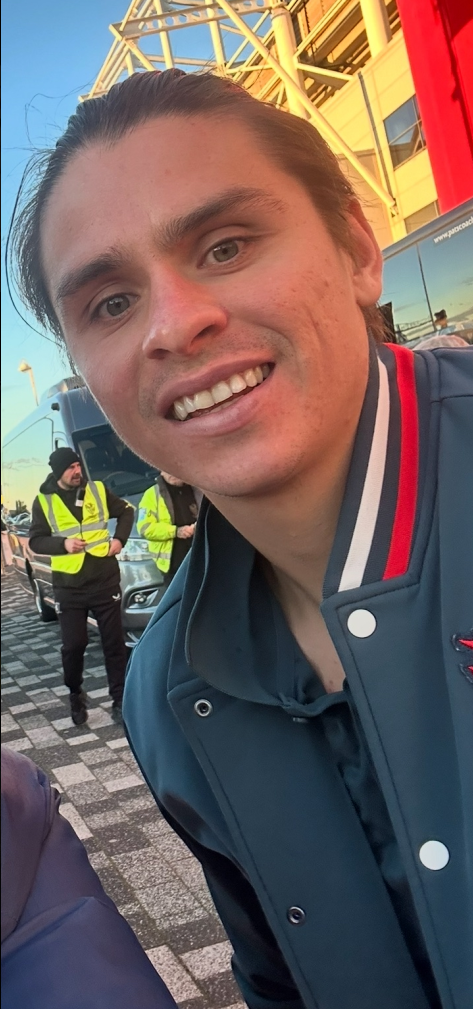
- Dobson with Wrexham in 2025

Personal information
- Full name: George David Dobson
- Date of birth: 15 November 1997 (age 28)
- Place of birth: Harold Wood, England
- Height: 6 ft 1 in (1.85 m)
- Positions: Midfielder; defender

Team information
- Current team: Wrexham
- Number: 15

Youth career
- 2005–2015: Arsenal
- 2015–2016: West Ham United

Senior career*
Years	Team	Apps	(Gls)
2016–2017	West Ham United	0	(0)
2016–2017	→ Walsall (loan)	21	(1)
2017–2018	Sparta Rotterdam	5	(0)
2017–2018	Jong Sparta	6	(1)
2018–2019	Walsall	60	(1)
2019–2021	Sunderland	34	(0)
2021	→ AFC Wimbledon (loan)	24	(1)
2021–2024	Charlton Athletic	126	(4)
2024–	Wrexham	90	(3)
- * Club domestic league appearances and goals as of 22:10, 4 November 2026 (UTC)

George David Dobson (born 15 November 1997) is an English professional footballer who plays as a midfielder for EFL Championship club Wrexham. He is a versatile player who can play as a defensive midfielder or as a centre-back, having mainly played as the latter as a youth player.

== Early life ==
Dobson attended Brentwood School in Essex between 2009 and 2014 until the age of 16. This is the same school as retired international footballer Frank Lampard and future Charlton Athletic and Wrexham teammate Elliot Lee.

== Club career ==
=== West Ham United ===
Dobson started his career as a youth player at Arsenal aged eight before joining West Ham on 28 July 2015. Dobson, aged 17 at the time, was placed straight into the club's U21 side and played frequently during the 2015–16 season. At Arsenal, Dobson was played as a centre-back. However, West Ham trained him into a central midfielder, often playing in a holding or defensive role. He is a boyhood West Ham United fan and this helped in the decision of joining the club in 2015.

==== Walsall (loan) ====
On 29 June 2016, Dobson signed for League One side Walsall on a season-long loan. He made his debut in the EFL Cup in a 2–0 home defeat to Yeovil Town. He started the match before being substituted on the 69th minute. His league debut came on 16 August when he started the match in a 0–2 defeat at Chesterfield.

=== Sparta Rotterdam ===
On 16 July 2017, it was announced Dobson had signed for Eredivisie side Sparta Rotterdam for an undisclosed fee.

=== Walsall ===
Dobson re-joined Walsall on a two-and-a-half-year contract during the 2017–18 January transfer window.

=== Sunderland ===
On 25 July 2019, Dobson signed for Sunderland on a three-year deal. He scored his first goal for Sunderland in an EFL Cup tie against Burnley on 28 August 2019.

In the 2020–21 season, Dobson had become a fringe player at Sunderland, starting only three league games. Despite being unhappy at his lack of gametime, he reportedly turned down several potential moves away from the club.

==== AFC Wimbledon (loan) ====
On 22 January 2021, when it was announced that Dobson had joined League One side AFC Wimbledon on loan for the remainder of the season. He scored his first goal for Wimbledon in a 1–1 draw with Wigan Athletic on 16 March 2021.

=== Charlton Athletic ===
Dobson joined Charlton Athletic on 1 July 2021, signing a two-year deal with the club.

In December 2022, following the appointment of Dean Holden as manager, Dobson was given the captaincy to take over from Jayden Stockley.

On 11 February 2024, it was announced that Dobson had signed a pre-contract with Hungarian side Fehérvár which would see him join the club on 1 July 2024. In the club's statement, it said that originally the deal would have seen Dobson move before the 14 February 2024 Hungarian transfer window closure, but that this deal had been cancelled by Charlton Athletic.

On 3 May 2024, after months of speculation, it was confirmed that Dobson would be leaving Charlton Athletic following the end of the 2023–24 season.

Despite having signed a pre-contract with Fehérvár, in July 2024, it was reported that Dobson and Fehérvár had mutually terminated the contract set to kick in from 1 July 2024 due to a change in personal circumstances for the player, making Dobson a free agent.

=== Wrexham ===
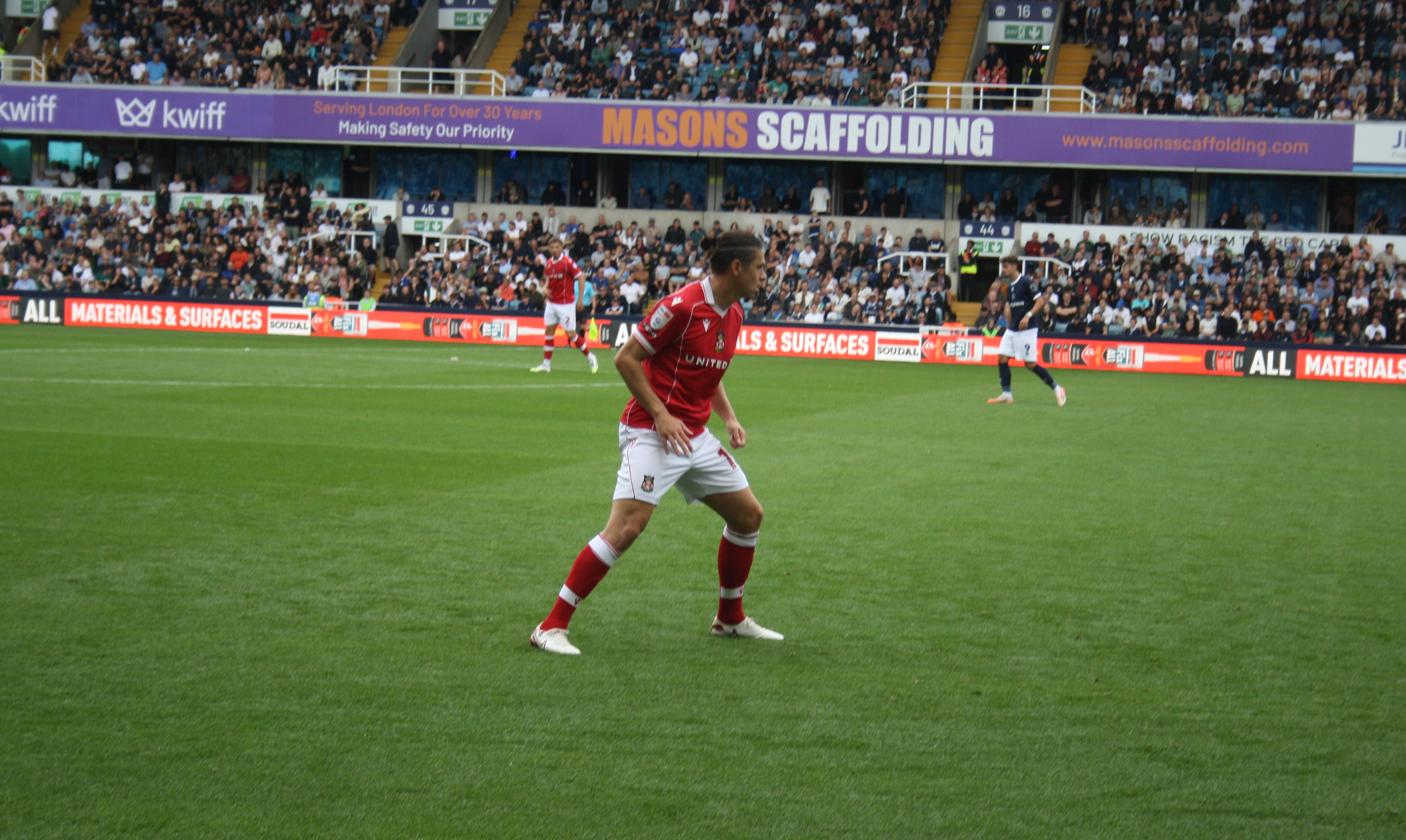
Dobson playing for Wrexham in 2025

On 6 July 2024, Dobson signed for League One club Wrexham on a three-year deal on a free transfer.

== Career statistics ==
As of match played 4 November 2026

Appearances and goals by club, season and competition
Club	Season	League			National cup		League cup		Other		Total	
Club	Season	Division	Apps	Goals	Apps	Goals	Apps	Goals	Apps	Goals	Apps	Goals
West Ham United	2015–16	Premier League	0	0	0	0	0	0	0	0	0	0
West Ham United	2016–17	Premier League	0	0	0	0	0	0	0	0	0	0
West Ham United	Total		0	0	0	0	0	0	0	0	0	0
Walsall (loan)	2016–17	League One	21	1	0	0	1	0	4 (Note: Appearances in EFL Trophy)	0	26	1
Sparta Rotterdam	2017–18	Eredivisie	5	0	0	0	—		0	0	5	0
Jong Sparta	2017–18	Tweede Divisie	6	1	—		—		—		6	1
Walsall	2017–18	League One	21	1	0	0	0	0	0	0	21	1
Walsall	2018–19	League One	39	0	3	0	2	0	0	0	44	0
Walsall	Total		81	2	3	0	3	0	4	0	91	2
Sunderland	2019–20	League One	29	0	0	0	4	1	2	0	35	1
Sunderland	2020–21	League One	5	0	1	0	1	0	4	1	11	1
Sunderland	Total		34	0	1	0	5	1	6	1	46	2
AFC Wimbledon (loan)	2020–21	League One	24	1	0	0	0	0	0	0	24	1
Charlton Athletic	2021–22	League One	38	1	2	0	1	0	2	0	43	1
Charlton Athletic	2022–23	League One	45	1	3	0	5	0	0	0	53	1
Charlton Athletic	2023–24	League One	43	2	2	1	0	0	3	1	48	4
Charlton Athletic	Total		126	4	7	1	6	0	5	1	144	6
Wrexham	2024–25	League One	42	1	1	0	1	0	4	1	48	2
Wrexham	2025–26	Championship	40	2	3	0	3	0	—		46	2
Wrexham	2026–27	Championship	8	0	0	0	0	0	—		8	0
Wrexham	Total		90	3	4	0	4	0	4	1	102	4
Career total			366	11	15	1	18	1	19	3	418	16

== Honours ==
Wrexham

- EFL League One runner-up: 2024–25

Individual

- Charlton Athletic Player of the Year: 2021–22
