= 2023–24 Wrexham A.F.C. season =

Welsh football club season

Wrexham
2023–24 season
- Owner: Wrexham Holdings LLC
- Co-chairmen: Ryan Reynolds; Rob McElhenney
- Manager: Phil Parkinson
- Stadium: Racecourse Ground
- League Two: 2nd (promoted)
- FA Cup: Fourth round
- EFL Cup: Second round
- EFL Trophy: Round of 32
- Top goalscorer: League: Paul Mullin (24); All: Paul Mullin (26)
- Highest home attendance: 12,562 (27 April 2024 vs. Stockport County)
- Lowest home attendance: 4,963 (5 December 2023 vs. Burton Albion)
- Average home league attendance: 11,213
- Biggest win: 6–0 (25 November 2023 vs. Morecambe) (13 April 2024 vs. Forest Green Rovers)
- Biggest defeat: 0–5 (23 September 2023 vs. Stockport County)
Home colours	Away colours	Third colours

The 2023–24 season was the 159th season in the existence of Wrexham A.F.C. They competed in League Two, in their first season back in the English Football League since the 2007–08 season. Wrexham is one of five Welsh clubs in the English football league system. In addition to the league, they competed in the FA Cup, EFL Cup and the EFL Trophy. By virtue of a 6–0 win over Forest Green Rovers on 13 April and subsequent losses by MK Dons and Barrow, Wrexham clinched their second straight promotion to compete in League One in 2024–25.

The season was chronicled in the third season of the documentary series Welcome to Wrexham.

== Kits ==
Supplier: Macron / Shirt front sponsor: United Airlines / Shirt back sponsor: Vistaprint

Home	Away	Third

== First-team squad ==
As of 30 June 2024

No.	Player	Nat.	Pos.	Date of birth (age)	Previous club	Signed on	Contract ends	Apps.	Goals
Goalkeepers
1	Rob Lainton	(England)	GK	12 October 1989 (aged 34)	(England) Port Vale	22 November 2018	30 June 2024	143	0
21	Mark Howard	(England)	GK	21 September 1986 (aged 37)	(England) Carlisle United	5 July 2022	30 June 2024	49	0
31	Luke McNicholas	(Republic of Ireland)	GK	1 January 2000 (aged 24)	(Republic of Ireland) Sligo Rovers	23 January 2024	30 June 2026	3	0
33	Arthur Okonkwo	(England)	GK	9 September 2001 (aged 22)	(England) Arsenal	1 September 2023	31 May 2024	40	0
41	Liam Hall	(England)	GK	18 December 2004 (aged 19)	(England) Bradford (Park Avenue)	18 August 2023	30 June 2024	0	0
Defenders
3	Callum McFadzean	(Scotland)	LWB	16 January 1994 (aged 30)	(England) Crewe Alexandra	27 January 2022	30 June 2024	57	0
4	Ben Tozer	(England)	CB	1 March 1990 (aged 34)	(England) Cheltenham Town	27 August 2021	30 June 2024	141	7
5	Aaron Hayden	(England)	CB	16 January 1997 (aged 27)	(England) Carlisle United	8 August 2021	30 June 2024	94	20
6	Jordan Tunnicliffe	(England)	CB	28 October 1993 (aged 30)	(England) Crawley Town	1 July 2022	30 June 2024	41	2
15	Eoghan O'Connell	(Republic of Ireland)	CB	13 August 1995 (aged 28)	(England) Charlton Athletic	31 January 2023	30 June 2025	48	2
17	Luke Bolton	(England)	RWB	7 October 1999 (aged 24)	(England) Salford City	1 February 2024	30 June 2026	17	0
19	Jacob Mendy	(The Gambia)	LWB	27 December 1996 (aged 27)	(England) Boreham Wood	1 August 2022	30 June 2025	68	6
23	James McClean	(Republic of Ireland)	LWB	22 April 1989 (aged 35)	(England) Wigan Athletic	4 August 2023	30 June 2024	44	4
25	Will Boyle	(England)	CB	1 September 1995 (aged 28)	(England) Huddersfield Town	13 July 2023	30 June 2026	28	4
29	Ryan Barnett	(England)	RWB	23 September 1999 (aged 24)	(England) Solihull Moors	24 February 2023	30 June 2025	49	2
32	Max Cleworth	(England)	CB	9 August 2002 (aged 21)	Academy	1 February 2021	30 June 2025	99	2
34	Aaron James	(England)	CB	30 June 2005 (aged 19)	Academy	1 July 2023	30 June 2024	5	0
Midfielders
7	Jordan Davies	(Wales)	CM	18 October 1998 (aged 25)	(England) Brighton & Hove Albion	25 August 2020	30 June 2025	149	37
8	Luke Young	(England)	CM	22 February 1993 (aged 31)	(England) Torquay United	1 July 2018	30 June 2024	259	22
12	George Evans	(England)	DM	13 December 1994 (aged 29)	(England) Millwall	1 September 2023	30 June 2025	32	0
14	Anthony Forde	(Republic of Ireland)	RM	16 November 1993 (aged 30)	(England) Oxford United	28 July 2022	30 June 2025	58	4
20	Andy Cannon	(England)	CM	14 March 1996 (aged 28)	(England) Hull City	9 December 2022	30 June 2025	60	8
22	Thomas O'Connor	(Republic of Ireland)	DM	21 April 1999 (aged 25)	(England) Burton Albion	31 January 2022	30 June 2025	80	8
30	James Jones	(Scotland)	CM	13 February 1996 (aged 28)	(England) Lincoln City	24 August 2021	30 June 2025	132	16
38	Elliot Lee	(England)	AM	16 December 1994 (aged 29)	(England) Luton Town	8 July 2022	30 June 2027	107	31
45	Harry Ashfield	(Wales)	AM	23 March 2006 (aged 18)	Academy	1 July 2023	30 June 2024	1	0
Forwards
9	Ollie Palmer	(England)	CF	21 January 1992 (aged 32)	(England) AFC Wimbledon	24 January 2022	30 June 2025	125	41
10	Paul Mullin	(England)	CF	6 November 1994 (aged 29)	(England) Cambridge United	23 July 2021	30 June 2027	140	105
11	Jack Marriott	(England)	CF	9 September 1994 (aged 29)	(England) Fleetwood Town	1 February 2024	30 June 2025	17	1
18	Sam Dalby	(England)	CF	7 December 1999 (aged 24)	(England) Southend United	1 August 2022	30 June 2025	89	13
26	Steven Fletcher	(Scotland)	CF	26 March 1987 (aged 37)	(England) Dundee United	8 September 2023	30 June 2024	34	8
Out on Loan
16	Billy Waters	(England)	SS	15 October 1994 (aged 29)	(England) Barrow	22 March 2023	30 June 2025	8	0
24	Scott Butler	(Wales)	CB	30 December 2002 (aged 21)	Academy	5 October 2022	30 June 2024	1	0
27	Jake Bickerstaff	(England)	CF	11 September 2001 (aged 22)	Academy	1 July 2020	30 June 2026	28	6
35	Owen Cushion	(England)	CM	5 January 2005 (aged 19)	Academy	6 June 2023	30 June 2024	1	0
39	Daniel Davies	(Wales)	LWB	20 November 2004 (aged 19)	Academy	6 January 2022	30 June 2024	1	0

== Transfers ==
=== In ===
Date	Pos.	Nat.	Name	Club	Fee	Ref.
13 July 2023	DF	(England)	Will Boyle	(England) Huddersfield Town	Undisclosed	
4 August 2023	DF	(Republic of Ireland)	James McClean	(England) Wigan Athletic	Undisclosed	
18 August 2023	GK	(England)	Liam Hall	(England) Bradford (Park Avenue)	Undisclosed	
1 September 2023	MF	(England)	George Evans	(England) Millwall	Free transfer	
8 September 2023	FW	(Scotland)	Steven Fletcher	Free agent	—N/a	
23 January 2024	GK	(Republic of Ireland)	Luke McNicholas	(Republic of Ireland) Sligo Rovers	Undisclosed	
1 February 2024	DF	(England)	Luke Bolton	(England) Salford City	Undisclosed	
1 February 2024	FW	(England)	Jack Marriott	(England) Fleetwood Town	Undisclosed	

=== Loans in ===
Date	Pos.	Nat.	Name	Club	Duration	Ref.
11 August 2023	GK	(Republic of Ireland)	Luke McNicholas	(Republic of Ireland) Sligo Rovers	1 January 2024	
1 September 2023	GK	(England)	Arthur Okonkwo	(England) Arsenal	31 May 2024	

=== Loans out ===
Date	Pos.	Nat.	Name	Club	Duration	Ref.
18 August 2023	DF	(Wales)	Scott Butler	(England) Nantwich Town	1 January 2024	
10 January 2024	MF	(England)	Owen Cushion	(Wales) Colwyn Bay	30 June 2024	
10 January 2024	DF	(Wales)	Daniel Davies	(Wales) Colwyn Bay	30 June 2024	
11 January 2024	FW	(England)	Billy Waters	(England) Doncaster Rovers	End of Season	
19 January 2024	DF	(Wales)	Scott Butler	(England) Marine	End of Season	
1 February 2024	FW	(England)	Jake Bickerstaff	(England) Accrington Stanley	End of Season	

=== Released ===
Date	Pos.	Nat.	Name	Subsequent club	Join date	Ref.
30 June 2023	DF	(Wales)	Ryan Austin	(Wales) Caernarfon Town	1 July 2023	
30 June 2023	FW	(England)	Jake Hyde	(England) Yeovil Town	1 July 2023	
30 June 2023	FW	(Wales)	Dan Jones	(Wales) Colwyn Bay	1 July 2023	
30 June 2023	FW	(Wales)	Louis Lloyd	(Wales) Caernarfon Town	1 July 2023	
30 June 2023	DF	(England)	Reece Hall-Johnson	(England) Barnet	4 July 2023	
30 June 2023	MF	(England)	Tom Jenkins	(England) Northwich Victoria F.C.	23 July 2023	
30 June 2023	GK	(England)	Rory Watson	(England) Doncaster Rovers	8 August 2023	
30 June 2023	MF	(Wales)	Kai Evans	(England) Nantwich Town F.C.	11 August 2023	
30 June 2023	MF	(Netherlands)	Malik Dijksteel	(Republic of Ireland) Cork City F.C.	16 August 2023	
30 June 2023	GK	(Australia)	Kai Calderbank-Park	(England) Chester F.C.	20 October 2023	
30 June 2023	MF	(England)	Will Mountfield	Currently unattached		
30 June 2023	DF	(England)	Harry Lennon	Retired		
21 August 2023	GK	(England)	Ben Foster	Retired		
1 February 2024	DF	(England)	Bryce Hosannah	(England) AFC Fylde	6 February 2024	
1 February 2024	FW	(Republic of Ireland)	Liam McAlinden	(England) Scunthorpe United F.C.	15 February 2024	

=== New contracts ===
Date	Pos.	Nat.	Name	Contract until	Team	Ref.
23 May 2023	MF	(Republic of Ireland)	Liam McAlinden	2024	First team	
9 June 2023	GK	(England)	Ben Foster	2024	First team	
9 October 2023	MF	(Scotland)	James Jones	2025	First team	
20 October 2023	FW	(England)	Sam Dalby	2025	First team	
30 December 2023	FW	(England)	Jake Bickerstaff	2026	First team	
1 January 2024	FW	(England)	Paul Mullin	2027	First team	
1 January 2024	MF	(England)	Elliot Lee	2027	First team	

== Pre-season and friendlies ==
Wrexham announced their first pre-season tour for July and their inaugural visit to the United States and confirmed three friendly matches against Manchester United, Chelsea and LA Galaxy II. On 12 June, a fourth friendly in the US was confirmed, against Philadelphia Union II.

19 July 2023 Friendly	Chelsea	5–0	Wrexham	Chapel Hill, United States
19:00 EDT	Maatsen 3', 42'; Casadei (yellow card) 59'; Nkunku 80'; Gallagher 90'; Chilwell 90+3'	Report		Stadium: Kenan Memorial Stadium; Attendance: 50,596; Referee: Marcos de Oliveira

22 July 2023 Friendly	LA Galaxy II	0–4	Wrexham	Carson, United States
19:30 PDT		Report	Hayden (yellow card) 27'; Cannon 47'; Lee 55'; Mullin 65'; Forde 89'	Stadium: Dignity Health Sports Park; Attendance: 10,553; Referee: Omeed Azadpour

25 July 2023 Friendly	Manchester United	1–3	Wrexham	San Diego, United States
19:30 PDT	Bishop (yellow card) 12'; Jurado 45'; Gore (red card) 47'; Fernández (yellow card) 51'	Report	Lee 29'; Hayden 36'; McFadzean (yellow card) 45+1'; Waters (yellow card) 65'; Dalby 69'	Stadium: Snapdragon Stadium; Attendance: 34,248; Referee: Ismail Elfath

28 July 2023 Friendly	Philadelphia Union II	1–1	Wrexham	Chester, United States
19:30 EDT	Rafanello 45+3'	Report	O'Connor 42'	Stadium: Subaru Park; Referee: Laura Rodriguez

== Competitions ==
=== Overall record ===
Competition	First match	Last match	Starting round	Final position	Record							
Competition	First match	Last match	Starting round	Final position	Pld	W	D	L	GF	GA	GD	Win %
League Two	5 August	27 April	Matchday 1	2nd	46	26	10	10	89	52	+37	56.52
FA Cup	4 November	29 January	First round	Fourth round	4	3	0	1	7	5	+2	75.00
EFL Cup	8 August	28 August	First round	Second round	2	0	2	0	1	1	+0	0.00
EFL Trophy	5 September	5 December	Group stage	Round of 32	4	3	0	1	8	4	+4	75.00
Total					56	32	12	12	105	62	+43	57.14

Source: Soccerway

=== League Two ===
==== League table ====
Pos	Team	Pld	W	D	L	GF	GA	GD	Pts	Promotion, qualification or relegation
1	Stockport County (C, P)	46	27	11	8	96	48	+48	92	Promoted to EFL League One
2	Wrexham (P)	46	26	10	10	89	52	+37	88	Promoted to EFL League One
3	Mansfield Town (P)	46	24	14	8	90	47	+43	86	Promoted to EFL League One
4	Milton Keynes Dons	46	23	9	14	83	68	+15	78	Qualified for League Two play-offs
5	Doncaster Rovers	46	21	8	17	73	68	+5	71	Qualified for League Two play-offs
6	Crewe Alexandra	46	19	14	13	69	65	+4	71	Qualified for League Two play-offs

Source: EFL Official Website
Rules for classification: 1) Points; 2) Goal difference; 3) Number of goals scored; 4) Head-to-head results; 5) Wins; 6) Away goals; 7) Penalty points (sec 9.5); 8) 12-point sending off offences
(C) Champions; (P) Promoted

==== League Results summary ====
Overall								Home						Away					
Pld	W	D	L	GF	GA	GD	Pts	W	D	L	GF	GA	GD	W	D	L	GF	GA	GD
46	26	10	10	89	52	+37	88	17	3	3	62	25	+37	9	7	7	27	27	0

Source: Soccerway

==== League Results by round ====
Round	1	2	3	4	5	6	7	8	9	10	11	12	13	14	15	16	17	18	19	20	22	23	24	25	26	28	29	31	32	33	34	27^{2}	35	21^{1}	36	37	38	39	40	41	42	43	30^{3}	44	45	46
Ground	H	A	H	H	A	A	H	H	A	H	A	A	H	A	H	A	H	A	H	A	A	H	H	A	A	H	H	A	H	A	H	A	A	A	H	A	H	H	A	H	A	A	H	H	A	H
Result	L	D	W	D	D	W	W	W	L	D	D	W	W	D	W	W	W	L	W	D	W	W	W	L	W	W	L	L	L	W	W	D	L	D	W	W	D	L	W	W	L	W	W	W	W	W
Position	21	20	11	15	16	13	7	4	7	9	9	7	5	4	3	3	2	4	2	2	3	3	2	3	3	2	2	4	5	4	3	3	4	4	3	3	3	3	3	3	3	2	2	3	3	2

Source: Soccerway
A = Away; H = Home; W = Win; D = Draw; L = Loss; P = Postponed
Notes:
- ^{1} Matchday 21 (vs Forest Green Rovers) was postponed due to a waterlogged pitch.
- ^{2} Matchday 27 (vs Milton Keynes Dons) was postponed due to FA Cup involvements.
- ^{3} Matchday 30 (vs Crawley Town) was postponed due to FA Cup involvements.

==== Matches ====
On 22 June, the EFL League Two fixtures were released.

Win Draw Loss Fixtures

5 August 2023 1	Wrexham	3–5	Milton Keynes Dons	Wrexham
15:00 BST	Lee (yellow card) 23'; O'Connell (yellow card) 24'; Mendy 42'; Davies 82' (Hosannah); Forde 90+6' (Palmer)	Report	O'Connell 6' (o.g.); Eisa 10' (Leko) (yellow card) 11'; Leko 51' (Robson), 64' (Eisa); Norman (yellow card) 68'; MacGillivray (yellow card) 84'; Harvie 90+4'	Stadium: Racecourse Ground; Attendance: 10,205; Referee: Tom Reeves

12 August 2023 2	Wimbledon	1–1	Wrexham	Merton, London
15:00 BST	Bugiel (yellow card) 40'; Lewis (yellow card) 48'; Al-Hamadi (penalty missed); Pell (yellow card) 75'; Tilley 81' (pen.)	Report	Lee 22' (Mendy) (yellow card) 75'; Boyle (yellow card) 56'	Stadium: Plough Lane; Attendance: 8,584; Referee: Darren Drysdale

15 August 2023 3	Wrexham	4–2	Walsall	Wrexham
19:45 BST	Boyle; Palmer (yellow card) 16' (goal) 20'; Bickerstaff 56' (Mendy); Lee 85'	Report	Hussey 24' (Draper); McEntee (yellow card) 35'; Foulkes (yellow card) 53'; Oteh (yellow card) 83'; Forde 90+1' (o.g.)	Stadium: Racecourse Ground; Attendance: 10,188; Referee: Simon Mather

19 August 2023 4	Wrexham	5–5	Swindon Town	Wrexham
15:00 BST	Bickerstaff 29'; Lee 51' (pen.) 90+6' (Dalby); Jones 55' (Lee) 90+2' (Mendy); Boyle (yellow card) 76'	Report	Young 17' (Austin) 34' (McEachran); Brewitt (yellow card) 20'; Austin 27' (Kemp); Kemp 31' (Young) (yellow card) 56' (goal) 71' (Young); Blake-Tracy (yellow card) 64'	Stadium: Racecourse Ground; Attendance: 10,258; Referee: Charles Breakspear

26 August 2023 5	Barrow	1–1	Wrexham	Barrow-in-Furness
15:00 BST	Warren (yellow card) 45'; Acquah 52' (Spence); White (yellow card) 57'; Canavan (yellow card) 88'	Report	Lee 12' (pen.); O'Connell (yellow card) 47'; O'Connor (yellow card) 58'	Stadium: Holker Street; Attendance: 4,789; Referee: Daniel Middleton

2 September 2023 6	Tranmere Rovers	0–1	Wrexham	Birkenhead
12:30 BST	Merrie (yellow card) 55'	Report	Hayden 56' (O'Connor); O'Connell (yellow card) 83'	Stadium: Prenton Park; Attendance: 10,630; Referee: Martin Woods

9 September 2023 7	Wrexham	2–1	Doncaster Rovers	Wrexham
15:00 BST	Lee (yellow card) 21'; Young 37' (Barnett); O'Connor (yellow card) 79'	Report	Olowu (yellow card) 47'; Faal 52' (Ironside); Senior (yellow card) 80'; Anderson (yellow card) 90+9'	Stadium: Racecourse Ground; Attendance: 10,254; Referee: Leigh Doughty

16 September 2023 8	Wrexham	3–0	Grimsby Town	Wrexham
15:00 BST	McClean (yellow card) 6'; Palmer 21' (Lee); Boyle 31' (McClean); Lee (yellow card) 44' (goal) 79' (Dalby)	Report	Conteh (yellow card) 39'; Maher (yellow card) 50'	Stadium: Racecourse Ground; Attendance: 10,116; Referee: David Rock

23 September 2023 9	Stockport County	5–0	Wrexham	Stockport
15:00 BST	Olaofe 21' (Collar) (yellow card) 22' (goal) 30' 50'; Barry 32'; Madden 90' (Barry)	Report	Dalby (yellow card) 48'	Stadium: Edgeley Park; Attendance: 9,548; Referee: Carl Brook

30 September 2023 10	Wrexham	3–3	Crewe Alexandra	Wrexham
15:00 BST	Palmer (yellow card) 11'; Barnett (red card) 36'; Mullin 40' (Hayden) 47' (Palmer) (yellow card) 90+2'; McClean (yellow card) 45+2'; Boyle (yellow card) 45+4'; Fletcher 90+5' (Mendy)	Report	Demetriou 25' (Tabiner); Tracey (yellow card) 33' (goal) 65' (Adebisi); Long 45+5' (pen.); Williams (yellow card) 79'; Davies (yellow card) 82'; Holíček (yellow card) 87'	Stadium: Racecourse Ground; Attendance: 10,007; Referee: Lee Swabey

3 October 2023 11	Mansfield Town	0–0	Wrexham	Mansfield
19:45 BST	Clarke (yellow card) 18'; Cargill (yellow card) 19'	Report	Evans (yellow card) 69'	Stadium: Field Mill; Attendance: 8,613; Referee: Adam Herczeg

7 October 2023 12	Crawley Town	0–1	Wrexham	Crawley
15:00 BST	Wright (yellow card) 70'; Gordon (yellow card) 90+2'	Report	Palmer 13' (yellow card) 33'; Mendy (yellow card) 43'; McClean (yellow card) 45+1'; Cannon (red card) 66'; Hayden (yellow card) 76'; Fletcher (yellow card) 83'; O'Connor (yellow card) 90+7'	Stadium: Broadfield Stadium; Attendance: 5,572; Referee: Ollie Yates

14 October 2023 13	Wrexham	3–2	Salford City	Wrexham
15:00 BST	Lee 39' (McClean); Jones (yellow card) 45+2'; O'Connell (yellow card) 75'; Mullin (yellow card) 80'; Fletcher 88'; Davies 89' (Dalby)	Report	Smith 36' (Lund); Ingram (yellow card) 45+1'; Tilt (yellow card) 45+2'; Shephard (yellow card) 60'; Bolton (yellow card) 81'	Stadium: Racecourse Ground; Attendance: 9,771; Referee: Ben Toner

21 October 2023 14	Bradford City	1–1	Wrexham	Bradford
15:00 BST	Smallwood (yellow card) 6'; Walker (yellow card) 26'; Pointon (yellow card) 37'; Wilson 85'	Report	Mullin (yellow card) 2' (goal) 68' (Barnett); Jones (yellow card) 29'	Stadium: Valley Parade; Attendance: 21,552; Referee: Ross Joyce

24 October 2023 15	Wrexham	2–1	Sutton United	Wrexham
19:45 BST	Mullin (yellow card) 90+4'; Tunnicliffe (yellow card) 89'; Lee 89'; McClean (yellow card) 90+6'	Report	O'Brien	Stadium: Racecourse Ground; Attendance: 10,183; Referee: Seb Stockbridge

28 October 2023 16	Notts County	0–2	Wrexham	Nottingham
15:00 BST	Crowley (yellow card) 28'; Jones (yellow card) 37'	Report	Jones (yellow card) 6'; Mullin (yellow card) 37'; McClean (yellow card) 43'; Lee 74' (Cannon); Palmer	Stadium: Meadow Lane; Attendance: 16,083; Referee: Marc Edwards

11 November 2023 17	Wrexham	2–0	Gillingham	Wrexham
15:00 BST	Palmer 1'; Tozer 71' (Mendy)	Report		Stadium: Racecourse Ground; Attendance: 10,268; Referee: Will Finnie

18 November 2023 18	Accrington Stanley	2–0	Wrexham	Accrington
15:00 BST	Adedoyin (yellow card) 28'; Leigh 50' (pen.); Longelo 73'	Report	Mullin (penalty missed) 90+10	Stadium: Crown Ground; Attendance: 5,261; Referee: Neil Hair

25 November 2023 19	Wrexham	6–0	Morecambe	Wrexham
15:00 BST	Senior 5' (o.g.); Mullin 7' (Cannon) 67' 77' (O'Connor); Cannon (yellow card) 19'; Mendy 35' (Cannon); Jones 90+6' (Dalby)	Report	McKiernan (yellow card) 56'	Stadium: Racecourse Ground; Attendance: 10,224; Referee: Ben Atkinson

28 November 2023 20	Harrogate Town	2–2	Wrexham	Harrogate
19:45 BST	March (yellow card) 22'; Cornelius 45' (Muldoon) (yellow card) 45+4'; O'Connor	Report	Cannon 36' (McClean); Lee; Tozer (yellow card) 63'; Hayden (yellow card) 90+3'	Stadium: Wetherby Road; Attendance: 3,767; Referee: Martin Woods

16 December 2023 22	Wrexham	2–1	Colchester United	Wrexham
15:00 BST	Lee 4'; Evans (yellow card) 20' (yellow-red card) 26'; McClean (yellow card) 37'; Tozer (yellow card) 56'; Mitchell 69' (o.g.); Davies (yellow card) 90+4'	Report	Taylor (yellow card) 43'; Kelleher (yellow card) 74'; Fevrier 89'	Stadium: Racecourse Ground; Attendance: 9,746; Referee: Oliver Yates

23 December 2023 23	Wrexham	2–0	Newport County	Wrexham
15:00 BST	Jones; Lee 87' (Tozer)	Report	Wildig (yellow card) 9'	Stadium: Racecourse Ground; Attendance: 12,095; Referee: John Busby

26 December 2023 24	Swindon Town	0–1	Wrexham	Swindon
15:00 BST	Austin (yellow card) 61'	Report	McClean 13' (Dalby); Jones (yellow card) 70' (yellow-red card) 74'	Stadium: The County Ground; Attendance: 12,271; Referee: Tom Reeves

29 December 2023 25	Walsall	3–1	Wrexham	Walsall
19:45 BST	Earing 16' (Draper); Farquharson (yellow card) 52'; Hutchinson 60'; James-Taylor (yellow card) 76'; Allen 83'; Knowles (yellow card) 90+3'	Report	Mullin 24' (pen.); Cannon (yellow card) 59'	Stadium: Bescot Stadium; Attendance: 8,709; Referee: Paul Howard

1 January 2024 26	Wrexham	4–1	Barrow	Wrexham
15:00 BST	McClean (yellow card) 45+4'; Fletcher 45+13' (McClean) 67' (Forde); Mullin 45+11'	Report	Spence 1' (Newby) (yellow card) 77'; White (yellow card) 45+10'; Proctor (yellow card) 90+5'; Ray (yellow card) 90+10'	Stadium: Racecourse Ground; Attendance: 12,323; Referee: Scott Oldham

13 January 2024 28	Wrexham	2–0	Wimbledon	Wrexham
15:00 BST	Fletcher 61' (McClean); Mullin 69'; Lee (yellow card) 85'	Report	Currie (yellow card) 21'	Stadium: Racecourse Ground; Attendance: 12,478; Referee: David Rock

20 January 2024 29	Newport County	1–0	Wrexham	Newport, Wales
15:00 BST	Palmer-Houlden 34' (Delaney) (yellow card) 90+4'; Morris (yellow card) 37'; Evans (yellow card) 55'; Charsley (yellow card) 64'; Waite (yellow card) 89'; Townsend (yellow card) 90'	Report	Boyle (red card) 18'; McClean (yellow card) 37'; O'Connell (yellow card) 84'; Palmer (yellow card) 90+1'	Stadium: Rodney Parade; Attendance: 9,537; Referee: Simon Mather

3 February 2024 31	Salford City	3–1	Wrexham	Salford
15:00 BST	Vassell 6' (Garbutt); Watt 16'; Garbutt (yellow card) 20'; Watson (yellow card) 35'; Smith 56' (Watt); Tilt (yellow card) 79'; N'Mai (yellow card) 90'	Report	Tunnicliffe (yellow card) 32'; Lee (yellow card) 34'; Dalby 41' (Hayden); Mullin (yellow card) 45+2'	Stadium: Moor Lane; Attendance: 4,591; Referee: Alex Chilowicz

10 February 2024 32	Wrexham	0–1	Bradford City	Wrexham
15:00 BST		Report	Platt (yellow card) 25'; Gilliead (yellow card) 45+2'; Tomkinson (yellow card) 64'; Cook (penalty missed) 83, 90'	Stadium: Racecourse Ground; Attendance: 12,447; Referee: Ben Speedie

13 February 2024 33	Sutton United	1–2	Wrexham	Sutton, London
19:45 BST	Adom-Malaki (yellow card) 8'; Eastmond (yellow card) 51'; Lakin 76'; Sanderson (yellow card) 78'	Report	Boyle 45+3'; Lee 85' (Bolton)	Stadium: Gander Green Lane; Attendance: 4,831; Referee: Daniel Middleton

17 February 2024 34	Wrexham	1–0	Notts County	Wrexham
15:00 BST	Fletcher 20'; Lee (yellow card) 55'	Report	McGoldrick (yellow card) 48'; Robertson (yellow card) 55'	Stadium: Racecourse Ground; Attendance: 12,532; Referee: Carl Brook

20 February 2024 27	Milton Keynes Dons	1–1	Wrexham	Milton Keynes
19:45 GMT	Kemp 26'; Lewington (red card) 60'; Harvie (yellow card) 83'; Gilbey (yellow card) 90+5'; O'Hora (yellow card) 90+8'	Report	McClean; Boyle (yellow card) 48' (yellow-red card) 77'; O'Connell (yellow card) 62'	Stadium: Stadium MK; Attendance: 11,282; Referee: Sam Purkiss
Note: Fixture was originally scheduled for 6 January, but was postponed due to FA Cup involvement.

24 February 2024 35	Gillingham	1–0	Wrexham	Gillingham, Kent
15:00 BST	Dieng 55'	Report	Lee (yellow card) 69'; Bolton (yellow card) 81'	Stadium: Priestfield Stadium; Attendance: 8,693; Referee: Scott Simpson

27 February 2024 21	Forest Green Rovers	1–1	Wrexham	Nailsworth
19:45 GMT	Osadebe 3' (Doidge); Robson (yellow card) 90+2'		Mullin 90+3' (pen.)	Stadium: The New Lawn; Attendance: 4,412; Referee: Will Finnie
Note: Originally postponed due to a waterlogged pitch in December 2023

2 March 2024 36	Wrexham	4–0	Accrington Stanley	Wrexham
15:00 BST	Mullin 17' (Barnett) 25' (Lee) 35' (Lee); Lee; McClean (yellow card) 75'	Report	Woods (yellow card) 46'; Shipley (red card) 90+1'	Stadium: Racecourse Ground; Attendance: 12,209; Referee: Ben Atkinson

9 March 2024 37	Morecambe	1–3	Wrexham	Morecambe
15:00 BST	Garner 4'; Melbourne (yellow card) 39' (yellow-red card) 49'; Songo'o (yellow card) 42'; Edwards (yellow card) 63'	Report	McClean; Mullin 55' (pen.); Fletcher 80' (McClean); Barnett (yellow card) 90+6'	Stadium: Mazuma Stadium; Attendance: 5,166; Referee: Thomas Parsons

12 March 2024 38	Wrexham	0–0	Harrogate Town	Wrexham
19:45 BST	McClean (yellow card) 73'	Report	Odoh (yellow card) 39'; O'Connor (yellow card) 61'	Stadium: Racecourse Ground; Attendance: 12,018; Referee: Matthew Corlett

16 March 2024 39	Wrexham	0–1	Tranmere Rovers	Wrexham
15:00 BST	Lee (yellow card) 12'; Cannon (yellow card) 77'	Report	Yarney (yellow card) 7'; Norris 8'; Hendry (yellow card) 33'	Stadium: Racecourse Ground; Attendance: 12,519; Referee: Scott Oldham

23 March 2024 40	Grimsby Town	1–3	Wrexham	Cleethorpes
15:00 BST	Hume (yellow card) 48'; Gnahoua	Report	Cannon 5' 36' (O'Connor); Mullin 42'; Cleworth (yellow card) 90+4'	Stadium: Blundell Park; Attendance: 7,728; Referee: Oliver Yates

29 March 2024 41	Wrexham	2–0	Mansfield Town	Wrexham
15:00 BST	McClean (yellow card) 3'; Mullin 32' (Cannon) 67' (pen.)	Report	Clarke (yellow card) 45'; Reed (yellow card) 69'; Lewis (yellow card) 71'	Stadium: Racecourse Ground; Attendance: 12,494; Referee: Lewis Smith

2 April 2024 42	Doncaster Rovers	1–0	Wrexham	Doncaster
19:45 BST	Maxwell (yellow card) 35'; Bailey; Sterry (yellow card) 74'; Ironside (yellow card) 84'	Report	Boyle (yellow card) 60'; Mullin (yellow card) 71'	Stadium: Eco-Power Stadium; Attendance: 10,537; Referee: Charles Breakspear

6 April 2024 43	Colchester United	1–2	Wrexham	Colchester
15:00 BST	Akinde 54' (McGeehan)	Report	Evans (yellow card) 29'; Mullin 62' (Barnett); Cleworth	Stadium: Colchester Community Stadium; Attendance: 8,432; Referee: Tom Reeves

9 April 2024 30	Wrexham	4–1	Crawley Town	Wrexham
19:45 GMT	Barnett 21' (Lee); Mullin 23' (Cannon) 82'; Cannon 76'; Bolton (yellow card) 90+5'	Report	Maguire (yellow card) 31'; Lolos 90+4' (Roles)	Stadium: Racecourse Ground; Attendance: 11,544; Referee: Edward Duckworth
Note: Originally postponed due to progression into the Fourth Round of the Emirates FA Cup

13 April 2024 44	Wrexham	6–0	Forest Green Rovers	Wrexham
15:00 BST	Lee 17'; Mullin 23' (McClean) 44' (O'Connell); Inniss 33' (o.g.); Barnett 63' (McClean); Marriott 83' (McClean)	Report	Osadebe (yellow card) 27'; McCann (yellow card) 62'	Stadium: Racecourse Ground; Attendance: 11,450; Referee: Sunny Sukhvir Gill

20 April 2024 45	Crewe Alexandra	0–3	Wrexham	Crewe
12:30 BST	Williams (yellow card) 45'; Rowe (yellow card) 45'; Cooney (red card) 54'; Nevitt (yellow card) 86'	Report	Palmer; McClean (yellow card) 45'; Mullin 45+1' (Palmer); Cannon 61' (Lee)	Stadium: Mornflake Stadium; Attendance: 9,033; Referee: Seb Stockridge
Note: Fixture was initially scheduled for a 15:00 kick-off, but was moved on request from the Cheshire Police.

27 April 2024 46	Wrexham	2–1	Stockport County	Wrexham
15:00 BST	Palmer 47' (O'Connell); Cannon 88' (Cleworth)	Report	Lemonheigh-Evans 29' (Camps); Madden (yellow card) 59'; Camps (yellow card) 67'; Pye (yellow card) 90+6'	Stadium: Racecourse Ground; Attendance: 12,562; Referee: Steve Martin

=== FA Cup ===
Wrexham were drawn away to Mansfield Town in the first round, at home to Yeovil Town in the second round, away to Shrewsbury Town in the third round and Blackburn Rovers in the fourth round.

Win Draw Loss Fixtures

4 November 2023 First round	Mansfield Town	1–2	Wrexham	Mansfield
19:45 GMT	Oates 60'; Reed (yellow card) 68'	Report	Dalby 2' (Cannon); Evans (yellow card) 32'; Mullin 58' (Dalby); Davies (yellow card) 90+3'	Stadium: Field Mill; Attendance: 6,158; Referee: Edward Duckworth

3 December 2023 Second Round	Wrexham	3–0	Yeovil Town	Wrexham
15:45 GMT	Palmer 14'; Lee (yellow card) 43'; Cannon 45+2'; Dalby 90+3' (McClean)	Report	Cooper (yellow card) 31'; Wannell (yellow card) 86'	Stadium: Racecourse Ground; Attendance: 9,604; Referee: Lee Swabey

7 January 2024 Third Round	Shrewsbury Town	0–1	Wrexham	Shrewsbury
14:00 GMT	Bowman (yellow card) 57'; Anderson (yellow card) 60'	Report	McClean (yellow card) 57'; O'Connor 72' (Dalby); Tozer (yellow card) 88'	Stadium: New Meadow; Attendance: 9,304; Referee: Andrew Kitchen

29 January 2024 Fourth round	Blackburn Rovers	4–1	Wrexham	Blackburn
19:30 GMT	Szmodics 45+1' (Tronstad); Gallagher 34' (Sigurðsson); Garrett (yellow card) 51'; Tronstad	Report	Cannon 19' (Dalby)	Stadium: Ewood Park; Attendance: 18,169; Referee: Andrew Madley

=== EFL Cup ===
Wrexham were drawn at home to Wigan Athletic in the first round and Bradford City in the second round.

Win Draw Loss Fixtures

8 August 2023 First round	Wrexham	0–0 (4–2 p)	Wigan Athletic	Wrexham
20:00 BST	Forde (yellow card) 45+4'; Palmer (yellow card) 68'; Barnett (yellow card) 75'	Report	Smith (yellow card) 20'; Sze (yellow card) 45'	Stadium: Racecourse Ground; Attendance: 9,736; Referee: Samuel Allison
	Penalties
	Young (penalty scored); Lee (penalty scored); O'Connor (penalty scored); Dalby (penalty scored)		(penalty scored) Wyke; (penalty scored) Humphrys; (penalty missed) Hughes; (penalty missed) Aasgaard

29 August 2023 Second round	Wrexham	1–1 (3–4 p)	Bradford City	Wrexham
19:45 BST	Young (yellow card) 67'; Boyle	Report	Smith 3' (pen.); Pattison (yellow card) 45+4'; Platt (yellow card) 90+2'	Stadium: Racecourse Ground; Attendance: 9,816; Referee: Ben Speedie
	Penalties
	Young (penalty missed); Lee (penalty scored); Palmer (penalty scored); McClean (penalty scored); Jones (penalty missed)		(penalty scored) Derbyshire; (penalty scored) Smallwood; (penalty scored) Wilson; (penalty scored) Halliday; (penalty missed) Oyegoke

=== EFL Trophy ===
In the group stage, Wrexham were drawn in Northern Group B alongside Crewe Alexandra, Port Vale and Newcastle United Under-21s. After finishing first in the group, they were drawn at home to Burton Albion in the second round.

Pos	Div	Team	Pld	W	PW	PL	L	GF	GA	GD	Pts	Qualification
1	L2	Wrexham	3	3	0	0	0	6	1	+5	9	Advance to Round 2
2	L1	Port Vale	3	1	1	0	1	3	3	0	5	Advance to Round 2
3	L2	Crewe Alexandra	3	1	0	0	2	2	5	−3	3	
4	ACA	Newcastle United U21	3	0	0	1	2	2	4	−2	1	

Updated to match(es) played on 7 November 2023. Source: EFL.com

Win Draw Loss Fixtures

5 September 2023 Group stage	Wrexham	1–0	Newcastle United Under-21s	Wrexham
19:00 BST	Dalby 13'; Tunnicliffe (yellow card) 20'; Jones (yellow card) 42'; Okonkwo (yellow card) 49'; Evans (yellow card) 74'	Report		Stadium: Racecourse Ground; Attendance: 7,988; Referee: Thomas Parsons

10 October 2023 Group stage	Crewe Alexandra	0–3	Wrexham	Crewe
19:00 BST	Colkett (yellow card) 33'; Offord (red card) 72'	Report	Tunnicliffe 5' (Davies); Davies (yellow card) 11' (goal) 13' (Bickerstaff); Young 73' (pen.)	Stadium: Gresty Road; Attendance: 3,751; Referee: Aaron Jackson

7 November 2023 Group stage	Wrexham	2–1	Port Vale	Wrexham
19:30 GMT	Mullin 70' (McClean); McClean (yellow card) 73'	Report	Thomas 31' (Massey); McDermott (yellow card) 90+7'	Stadium: Racecourse Ground; Attendance: 7,870; Referee: Lewis Smith

5 December 2023 Round of 32	Wrexham	2–3	Burton Albion	Wrexham
19:00 GMT	Dalby 5'; Davies (yellow card) 26' (goal) 90+2' (McClean)	Report	Oshilaja 1' (Sweeney); Helm 3' (Lubala); Sweeney (yellow card) 36'; Hughes (yellow card) 90+4'	Stadium: Racecourse Ground; Attendance: 4,963; Referee: Scott Tallis

== Squad statistics ==
=== Appearances and goals ===
No.	Pos	Nat	Player	Total		League Two		FA Cup		EFL Cup		EFL Trophy	
No.	Pos	Nat	Player	Apps	Goals	Apps	Goals	Apps	Goals	Apps	Goals	Apps	Goals
3	DF	(Scotland) SCO	Callum McFadzean	5	0	0+2	0	0	0	1	0	2	0
4	DF	(England) ENG	Ben Tozer	35	1	25+4	1	4	0	2	0	0	0
5	DF	(England) ENG	Aaron Hayden	18	1	15	1	2	0	1	0	0	0
6	DF	(England) ENG	Jordan Tunnicliffe	10	1	4+3	0	0+1	0	0	0	2	1
7	MF	(Wales) WAL	Jordan Davies	32	4	2+23	2	0+3	0	1	0	3	2
8	MF	(England) ENG	Luke Young	33	2	12+13	1	0+2	0	2	0	4	1
9	FW	(England) ENG	Ollie Palmer	46	8	25+14	7	1+2	1	1+1	0	0+2	0
10	FW	(Wales) WAL	Paul Mullin	43	26	34+4	24	4	1	0	0	0+1	1
11	MF	(England) ENG	Jack Marriott	17	1	3+14	1	0	0	0	0	0	0
12	MF	(England) ENG	George Evans	32	0	21+6	0	4	0	0	0	1	0
14	MF	(Republic of Ireland) IRL	Anthony Forde	18	1	8+6	1	2	0	1	0	1	0
15	DF	(Republic of Ireland) IRL	Eoghan O'Connell	33	0	28+2	0	1	0	1+1	0	0	0
17	DF	(England) ENG	Luke Bolton	17	0	5+12	0	0	0	0	0	0	0
18	FW	(England) ENG	Sam Dalby	40	5	14+17	1	2+2	2	1+1	0	3	2
19	DF	(The Gambia) GAM	Jacob Mendy	35	2	22+8	2	1+2	0	1+1	0	0	0
20	MF	(England) ENG	Andy Cannon	41	8	31+4	6	4	2	1	0	1	0
21	GK	(England) ENG	Mark Howard	10	0	6+1	0	1	0	2	0	0	0
22	MF	(Republic of Ireland) IRL	Thomas O'Connor	38	1	30+3	0	3	1	0+1	0	0+1	0
23	DF	(Republic of Ireland) IRL	James McClean	44	4	37	3	4	0	0+1	0	0+2	1
25	DF	(England) ENG	Will Boyle	28	4	20+4	3	0	0	1	1	3	0
26	FW	(Scotland) SCO	Steven Fletcher	34	8	10+23	8	1	0	0	0	0	0
29	DF	(England) ENG	Ryan Barnett	37	2	25+7	2	1+1	0	1+1	0	0+1	0
30	MF	(Scotland) SCO	James Jones	32	4	16+7	4	1+3	0	2	0	2+1	0
31	GK	(Republic of Ireland) IRL	Luke McNicholas	3	0	0	0	0	0	0	0	3	0
32	DF	(Wales) WAL	Max Cleworth	31	1	23+1	1	2	0	1	0	4	0
33	GK	(England) ENG	Arthur Okonkwo	40	0	36	0	3	0	0	0	1	0
34	DF	(England) ENG	Aaron James	4	0	1	0	0	0	0	0	2+1	0
38	MF	(England) ENG	Elliot Lee	53	16	43+3	16	4	0	0+2	0	0+1	0
45	MF	(England) ENG	Harry Ashfield	1	0	0	0	0	0	0	0	0+1	0
Players away on loan:
16	FW	(England) ENG	Billy Waters	7	0	1+2	0	0	0	0+1	0	2+1	0
27	FW	(England) ENG	Jake Bickerstaff	15	2	3+4	2	0+2	0	2	0	3+1	0
39	DF	(Wales) WAL	Daniel Davies	1	0	0	0	0	0	0	0	1	0
Players who appeared for Wrexham but left during the season:
12	GK	(England) ENG	Ben Foster	4	0	4	0	0	0	0	0	0	0
11	MF	(Republic of Ireland) IRL	Liam McAlinden	6	0	1+1	0	0	0	0	0	4	0
17	DF	(England) ENG	Bryce Hosannah	3	0	0+1	0	0	0	0	0	2	0

=== Goal scorers ===
Place	Position	Nation	Number	Name	League Two	FA Cup	EFL Cup	EFL Trophy	Total
1	FW	(Wales)	10	Paul Mullin	24	1	0	1	26
2	MF	(England)	38	Elliot Lee	16	0	0	0	16
3	FW	(Scotland)	26	Steven Fletcher	8	0	0	0	8
3	FW	(England)	9	Ollie Palmer	7	1	0	0	8
3	MF	(England)	20	Andy Cannon	6	2	0	0	8
6	FW	(England)	18	Sam Dalby	1	2	0	2	5
7	MF	(Wales)	7	Jordan Davies	2	0	0	2	4
7	MF	(Scotland)	30	James Jones	4	0	0	0	4
7	DF	(England)	25	Will Boyle	3	0	1	0	4
7	DF	(Republic of Ireland)	23	James McClean	3	0	0	1	4
11	FW	(England)	27	Jake Bickerstaff	2	0	0	0	2
11	MF	(England)	8	Luke Young	1	0	0	1	2
11	DF	(The Gambia)	19	Jacob Mendy	2	0	0	0	2
11	DF	(England)	29	Ryan Barnett	2	0	0	0	2
15	MF	(Republic of Ireland)	14	Anthony Forde	1	0	0	0	1
15	DF	(England)	5	Aaron Hayden	1	0	0	0	1
15	DF	(England)	6	Jordan Tunnicliffe	0	0	0	1	1
15	DF	(England)	4	Ben Tozer	1	0	0	0	1
15	MF	(Republic of Ireland)	22	Thomas O'Connor	0	1	0	0	1
15	DF	(Wales)	32	Max Cleworth	1	0	0	0	1
15	FW	(England)	11	Jack Marriott	1	0	0	0	1
Opponent's own goal(s)					3	0	0	0	3
Total					89	7	1	8	105

=== Assists ===
Place	Position	Nation	Number	Name	League Two	FA Cup	EFL Cup	EFL Trophy	Total
1	DF	(Republic of Ireland)	23	James McClean	10	1	0	2	13
2	FW	(England)	18	Sam Dalby	5	3	0	0	8
3	MF	(England)	20	Andy Cannon	5	2	0	0	7
3	FW	(Wales)	10	Paul Mullin	7	0	0	0	7
5	DF	(The Gambia)	19	Jacob Mendy	5	0	0	0	5
5	MF	(England)	38	Elliot Lee	5	0	0	0	5
7	MF	(Scotland)	30	James Jones	4	0	0	0	4
7	MF	(England)	8	Luke Young	2	0	1	1	4
7	DF	(England)	29	Ryan Barnett	4	0	0	0	4
10	MF	(Republic of Ireland)	22	Thomas O'Connor	3	0	0	0	3
10	FW	(England)	9	Ollie Palmer	3	0	0	0	3
12	DF	(England)	5	Aaron Hayden	2	0	0	0	2
12	MF	(England)	12	George Evans	2	0	0	0	2
14	MF	(Wales)	7	Jordan Davies	0	0	0	1	1
14	FW	(England)	27	Jake Bickerstaff	0	0	0	1	1
14	DF	(England)	4	Ben Tozer	1	0	0	0	1
14	MF	(England)	14	Anthony Forde	1	0	0	0	1
14	DF	(England)	17	Luke Bolton	1	0	0	0	1
14	DF	(Republic of Ireland)	15	Eoghan O'Connell	1	0	0	0	1
14	DF	(Wales)	32	Max Cleworth	1	0	0	0	1
14	Players who left Wrexham during the season:								
	DF	(England)	17	Bryce Hosannah	1	0	0	0	1
Total					63	4	1	5	73

=== Clean sheets ===
Place	Position	Nation	Number	Name	League Two	FA Cup	EFL Cup	EFL Trophy	Total
1	GK	(England)	33	Arthur Okonkwo	14	1	0	1	16
2	GK	(England)	21	Mark Howard	2	1	1	0	4
3	GK	(Republic of Ireland)	31	Luke McNicholas	0	0	0	1	1
Total					16	2	1	2	21

=== Hat-tricks ===
Player	Against	Result	Date	Competition	Ref
Paul Mullin	Morecambe	Win	25 November 2023	League Two	
Steven Fletcher	Barrow	Win	1 January 2024	League Two	
Paul Mullin	Accrington Stanley	Win	2 March 2024	League Two	

=== Disciplinary record ===
Number	Nation	Position	Name	League Two			FA Cup			EFL Cup			EFL Trophy			Total		
Number	Nation	Position	Name	Booked	(yellow card) (yellow-red card)	Sent off (straight red)	Booked	(yellow card) (yellow-red card)	Sent off (straight red)	Booked	(yellow card) (yellow-red card)	Sent off (straight red)	Booked	(yellow card) (yellow-red card)	Sent off (straight red)	Booked	(yellow card) (yellow-red card)	Sent off (straight red)
4	(England)	DF	Ben Tozer	2	0	0	1	0	0	0	0	0	0	0	0	3	0	0
5	(England)	DF	Aaron Hayden	2	0	0	0	0	0	0	0	0	0	0	0	2	0	0
6	(England)	DF	Jordan Tunnicliffe	2	0	0	0	0	0	0	0	0	1	0	0	3	0	0
7	(Wales)	MF	Jordan Davies	1	0	0	3	0	0	0	0	0	2	0	0	6	0	0
9	(England)	FW	Ollie Palmer	4	0	0	0	0	0	1	0	0	0	0	0	5	0	0
10	(Wales)	FW	Paul Mullin	7	0	0	0	0	0	0	0	0	0	0	0	7	0	0
12	(England)	MF	George Evans	3	1	0	1	0	0	0	0	0	1	0	0	5	1	0
14	(Republic of Ireland)	MF	Anthony Forde	0	0	0	0	0	0	1	0	0	0	0	0	1	0	0
15	(Republic of Ireland)	DF	Eoghan O'Connell	6	0	0	0	0	0	0	0	0	0	0	0	6	0	0
17	(England)	DF	Luke Bolton	2	0	0	0	0	0	0	0	0	0	0	0	2	0	0
18	(England)	FW	Sam Dalby	1	0	0	0	0	0	0	0	0	0	0	0	1	0	0
19	(The Gambia)	DF	Jacob Mendy	1	0	0	0	0	0	0	0	0	0	0	0	1	0	0
20	(England)	MF	Andy Cannon	3	0	1	0	0	0	0	0	0	0	0	0	3	0	1
22	(Republic of Ireland)	MF	Thomas O'Connor	3	0	0	0	0	0	0	0	0	0	0	0	3	0	0
23	(Republic of Ireland)	DF	James McClean	12	0	0	1	0	0	1	0	0	1	0	0	15	0	0
25	(England)	DF	Will Boyle	5	1	1	0	0	0	0	0	0	0	0	0	5	1	1
26	(Scotland)	FW	Steven Fletcher	1	0	0	0	0	0	0	0	0	0	0	0	1	0	0
29	(England)	DF	Ryan Barnett	1	0	1	0	0	0	1	0	0	0	0	0	2	0	1
30	(Scotland)	MF	James Jones	4	1	0	0	0	0	0	0	0	1	0	0	5	1	0
32	(Wales)	DF	Max Cleworth	1	0	0	0	0	0	0	0	0	0	0	0	1	0	0
33	(England)	GK	Arthur Okonkwo	0	0	0	0	0	0	0	0	0	1	0	0	1	0	0
38	(England)	MF	Elliot Lee	9	0	0	1	0	0	0	0	0	0	0	0	10	0	0
Total				70	3	3	7	0	0	4	0	0	7	0	0	88	3	3

== Home attendance ==
Competition	Total	Games	Average
League Two	257,861	23	11,211
FA Cup	9,640	1	9,640
EFL Cup	19,552	2	9,776
EFL Trophy	20,821	3	6,940
Total	307,874	29	10,616

- Renewed season tickets: 6,731 (99.25% renewal rate)
