= Jake Bickerstaff =

English footballer (born 2001)

Personal information
- Full name: Jacob Samuel Bickerstaff
- Date of birth: 11 September 2001 (age 25)
- Place of birth: Liverpool, England
- Height: 1.88 m (6 ft 2 in)
- Position: Forward

Team information
- Current team: Cheltenham Town
- Number: 11

Youth career
- Wrexham
- 2015–2017: Liverpool
- 2017–2020: Wrexham

Senior career*
Years	Team	Apps	(Gls)
2019–2026	Wrexham	12	(2)
2021	→ Caernarfon Town (loan)	16	(9)
2022	→ Nantwich Town (loan)	12	(10)
2024	→ Accrington Stanley (loan)	10	(1)
2024–2025	→ Altrincham (loan)	26	(2)
2025–2026	→ Cheltenham Town (loan)	24	(2)
2026–	Cheltenham Town	33	(2)
- * Club domestic league appearances and goals as of 23:52, 15 November 2026 (UTC)

Jacob Samuel Bickerstaff (born 11 September 2001), commonly known as Jake Bickerstaff, is an English professional footballer who plays as a forward for EFL League Two side Cheltenham Town.

== Career ==
=== Wrexham ===
Bickerstaff started his career with Wrexham, however played for two years in the academy of Liverpool before returning to Wrexham's youth team. He made his first team debut on 7 September 2019, scoring in a Scottish Challenge Cup match against Ayr United whilst still on youth terms with Wrexham. The match ended 1–1 but Wrexham advanced 6–5 on penalties.

He signed his first professional contract with Wrexham in the summer of 2020. He made his league debut on the opening day of the 2020–21 season, coming on as a substitute against Boreham Wood, replacing Adi Yussuf who went off injured.

On 1 February 2021, Bickerstaff signed on loan for Caernarfon Town until the end of the 2020–21 season.

On 31 January 2022, Bickerstaff signed on loan for Nantwich Town until the end of the 2021–22 season.

Bickerstaff came on for the last 8 minutes in Wrexham's FA Cup 4th round replay match at Sheffield United on 7 February 2023, which Wrexham lost 3–1.

On 16 August 2023, Bickerstaff scored his first league goal for Wrexham in a 4–2 home win over Walsall. He scored his second goal against Swindon Town on 19 August in a 5–5 draw at home.

On 1 February 2024, Bickerstaff signed on loan for Accrington Stanley until the end of the 2023-24 season.

On 30 August 2024 he joined Altrincham on loan until January 2025.

=== Cheltenham Town ===
On 1 August 2025, the eve of the new season, Bickerstaff joined League Two club Cheltenham Town on a season-long loan. On 8 January 2026, Bickerstaff signed for Cheltenham Town permanently.

== Career statistics ==
As of match played 14 November 2026

Appearances and goals by club, season and competition
Club	Season	League			FA Cup		League Cup		Other		Total	
Club	Season	Division	Apps	Goals	Apps	Goals	Apps	Goals	Apps	Goals	Apps	Goals
Wrexham	2020–21	National League	4	0	0	0	–		0	0	4	0
Wrexham	2022–23	National League	0	0	1	0	–		2 (Note: Appearance(s) in FA Trophy)	3	3	3
Wrexham	2023–24	League Two	7	2	2	0	2	0	4 (Note: Appearance(s) in EFL Trophy)	0	15	2
Wrexham	2024–25	League One	0	0	0	0	0	0	0	0	0	0
Wrexham	2025–26	Championship	0	0	0	0	0	0	0	0	0	0
Wrexham	Total		11	2	3	0	2	0	6	3	22	5
Accrington Stanley (loan)	2023–24	League Two	10	1	–		–		–		10	1
Cheltenham Town (loan)	2025–26	League Two	24	2	2	0	1	0	1	0	28	2
Cheltenham Town	2025–26	League Two	21	2	1	0	0	0	0	0	22	2
Cheltenham Town	2026–27	League Two	12	0	0	0	1	0	3	1	16	1
Cheltenham Town	Total		33	2	1	0	1	0	3	1	38	3
Career total			78	7	6	0	4	0	10	4	98	11
