= Max Cleworth =

English footballer (born 2002)

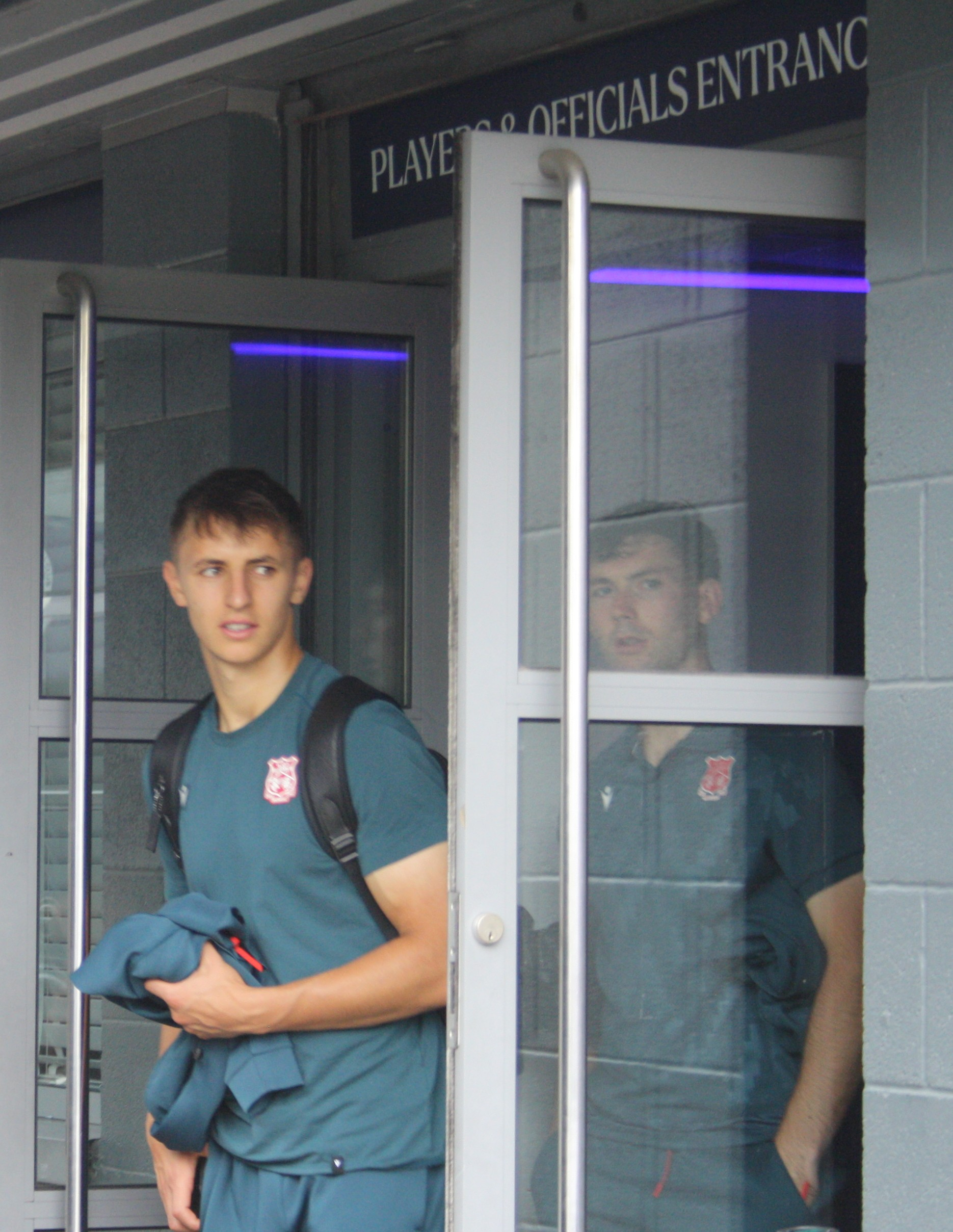
- Cleworth in 2025

Personal information
- Full name: Max George Cleworth
- Date of birth: 9 August 2002 (age 24)
- Place of birth: Frodsham, England
- Height: 6 ft 3 in (1.91 m)
- Position: Centre-back

Team information
- Current team: Wrexham
- Number: 4

Youth career
- 2012–2014: Connah's Quay Nomads
- 2014–2020: Wrexham

Senior career*
| Years | Team | Apps | (Gls) |
| 2020– | Wrexham | 155 | (11) |
| 2021 | → Caernarfon Town (loan) | 16 | (2) |
- * Club domestic league appearances and goals as of 08:52, 6 June 2026 (UTC)

Max Cleworth (/ˈkluːwərθ/ KLOO-wərth; born 9 August 2002) is an English professional footballer who plays as a centre-back for EFL Championship club Wrexham.

== Career ==
Cleworth started his career with Wrexham. He signed his first professional contract at Wrexham in 2020. In 2021, he signed for Welsh team Caernarfon Town on a six-month loan. In December 2022 he signed a new deal for Wrexham until 2025. In July 2024 he agreed to a contract extension through the conclusion of the 2026–27 season.

Cleworth's first league goal was a late winner in a 2–1 win against Colchester United on 6 April 2024.

On 10 August 2024, Cleworth scored the first League One goal for Wrexham in 19 years as Wrexham won in their first game after promotion. It was also his 100th career appearance for the club across all competitions. On 27 April 2025, Cleworth was included in the League One Team of the Year for the 2024–25 season alongside club teammate Ryan Barnett.

== Career statistics ==
As of match played 21 April 2026

Appearances and goals by club, season and competition
| Club | Season | League | | | FA Cup | | League Cup | | Other | | Total | |
| Club | Season | Division | Apps | Goals | Apps | Goals | Apps | Goals | Apps | Goals | Apps | Goals |
|---|---|---|---|---|---|---|---|---|---|---|---|---|
| Wrexham | 2019–20 | National League | 0 | 0 | 0 | 0 | — | | 4 (Note: One appearance in FA Trophy, three appearances in Scottish Challenge Cup) | 0 | 4 | 0 |
| Wrexham | 2020–21 | National League | 0 | 0 | 0 | 0 | — | | 1 (Note: Appearance(s) in FA Trophy) | 0 | 1 | 0 |
| Wrexham | 2021–22 | National League | 28 | 0 | 1 | 0 | — | | 7 (Note: Six appearances and one goal in FA Trophy, one appearance in National League play-offs) | 1 | 36 | 1 |
| Wrexham | 2022–23 | National League | 21 | 0 | 4 | 0 | — | | 2 | 0 | 27 | 0 |
| Wrexham | 2023–24 | League Two | 24 | 1 | 2 | 0 | 1 | 0 | 4 (Note: Appearances in EFL Trophy) | 0 | 31 | 1 |
| Wrexham | 2024–25 | League One | 41 | 7 | 1 | 0 | 0 | 0 | 5 | 1 | 47 | 8 |
| Wrexham | 2025–26 | Championship | 41 | 3 | 2 | 0 | 2 | 0 | — | | 45 | 3 |
| Wrexham | 2026–27 | Championship | 0 | 0 | 0 | 0 | — | | — | | 0 | 0 |
| Wrexham | Total | | 155 | 11 | 10 | 0 | 3 | 0 | 23 | 2 | 191 | 13 |
| Caernarfon Town (loan) | 2020–21 | Cymru Premier | 16 | 2 | — | | — | | — | | 16 | 2 |
| Career total | | | 171 | 13 | 10 | 0 | 3 | 0 | 23 | 2 | 207 | 15 |

== Honours ==
Wrexham

- National League: 2022–23
- EFL League Two second-place promotion: 2023–24
- EFL League One second-place promotion: 2024–25

Individual

- Wrexham Young Player of the Season: 2021–22, 2023–24, 2024–25
- Wrexham Players' Player of the Season: 2024–25
- EFL League One Team of the Season: 2024–25
