= Ryan Barnett =

English footballer

Personal information
- Full name: Ryan Jack Barnett
- Date of birth: 23 September 1999 (age 27)
- Place of birth: Shrewsbury, England
- Height: 5 ft 11 in (1.80 m)
- Positions: Right wing-back; right-back

Team information
- Current team: Milton Keynes Dons (on loan from Wrexham)
- Number: 19

Youth career
- 2007−2018: Shrewsbury Town

Senior career*
Years	Team	Apps	(Gls)
2016–2021	Shrewsbury Town	8	(0)
2018–2019	→ AFC Telford United (loan)	8	(0)
2019	→ AFC Telford United (loan)	17	(1)
2019–2020	→ AFC Telford United (loan)	18	(3)
2021	→ Gloucester City (loan)	1	(0)
2021	→ Solihull Moors (loan)	5	(1)
2021–2023	Solihull Moors	73	(3)
2023–	Wrexham	96	(4)
2026–	→ Milton Keynes Dons (loan)	1	(0)
- * Club domestic league appearances and goals as of 23 August 2026 (UTC)

Ryan Jack Barnett (born 23 September 1999) is an English professional footballer who plays as a right wing-back or right-back for EFL League One club Milton Keynes Dons, on loan from EFL Championship club Wrexham.

== Career ==
=== Shrewsbury Town ===
Barnett joined the Shrewsbury Town youth system in 2007, and received his first call-up to the senior squad by manager Paul Hurst on 26 December 2016, where he was an unused substitute in an away EFL League One match at Bolton Wanderers. He signed a two-and-a-half-year professional contract with the club in February 2017 - with the option of a further year - whilst still a first-year scholar.

The following season, Barnett made his professional debut as a substitute in a 3−0 victory against West Bromwich Albion U21s in an EFL Trophy group-stage match, coming on in the 67th minute in place of Lenell John-Lewis. He made his English Football League debut on 23 October 2018, coming on for the last two minutes in place of Greg Docherty in a 3−1 home win against Barnsley, under Hurst's replacement, John Askey.

Barnett joined National League North side AFC Telford United on an initial one-month loan on 10 November 2018. He scored his first career goal on 15 December to open a 4–3 win at Farsley Celtic in the first round of the FA Trophy. He returned to his parent club to play in an EFL Trophy tie against Port Vale, playing the whole ninety minutes and scoring in the resulting penalty-shoot out, as Shrewsbury bowed out of the competition following a 1−1 draw. On 10 January 2019, he returned to AFC Telford for the rest of the season.

In May 2019, it was confirmed that Shrewsbury had taken up the one-year option on Barnett's contract, committing him to the club until summer 2020. On 7 November that year, he joined Telford on loan once again, until the end of the season.

After the 2019–20 National League was ended early due to the COVID-19 pandemic, Barnett returned to his parent club and signed a new one-year contract extension with the option of an additional year in June 2020. He scored his first goal for Shrewsbury Town in a 3−0 victory over Newcastle United Under−21s in an EFL Trophy group-stage match on 23 September of the same year.

On 8 February 2021, Barnett joined National League North leaders Gloucester City on a one-month loan deal.

On 18 March 2021, Barnett joined National League side Solihull Moors on a one-month loan.

On 12 May 2021 it was announced that he would leave Shrewsbury at the end of the season, following the expiry of his contract.

=== Solihull Moors ===
After spending time on loan with the club the following season, Barnett returned to Solihull Moors in June 2021, on a two-year permanent deal following his release from Shrewsbury.

=== Wrexham ===
In February 2023 Barnett signed for Wrexham on a deal lasting until 2025. He scored his first goal for the club 9 April 2024 in a 4–1 win against Crawley Town. He was awarded Wrexham's goal of the season in 2024 for a volley goal in the 6–0 win against Forest Green Rovers.

On 22 November 2024 he signed a new contract for Wrexham until 2027.

On 27 April 2025, Barnett made the League One Team of the Year 2024–25 alongside club teammate Max Cleworth.

On 23 September 2025, he passed 100 appearances mark after 2–0 win against Reading F.C. in third round of the EFL Cup.

On 20 August 2026, Barnett joined League One club Milton Keynes Don on a season-long loan deal.

== Personal life ==
Barnett's younger sister Isabel "Izzy" plays for the Wrexham A.F.C. Women U19 team.

== Career statistics ==
As of 7 March 2026

Appearances and goals by club, season and competition
Club	Season	League			FA Cup		EFL Cup		Other		Total	
Club	Season	Division	Apps	Goals	Apps	Goals	Apps	Goals	Apps	Goals	Apps	Goals
Shrewsbury Town	2016–17	League One	0	0	0	0	0	0	0	0	0	0
Shrewsbury Town	2017–18	League One	0	0	0	0	0	0	1 (Note: Appearance(s) in EFL Trophy)	0	1	0
Shrewsbury Town	2018–19	League One	1	0	0	0	0	0	3	0	4	0
Shrewsbury Town	2019–20	League One	0	0	0	0	1	0	2	0	3	0
Shrewsbury Town	2020–21	League One	7	0	1	0	0	0	4	2	12	2
Shrewsbury Town	Total		8	0	1	0	1	0	10	2	20	2
AFC Telford United (loans)	2018–19	National League North	25	1	—		—		6 (Note: Appearance(s) in FA Trophy)	1	31	2
AFC Telford United (loans)	2019–20	National League North	18	3	—		—		1	0	19	3
AFC Telford United (loans)	Total		43	4	0	0	0	0	7	1	50	5
Gloucester City (loan)	2020–21	National League North	1	0	0	0	—		0	0	1	0
Solihull Moors	2020–21 (loan)	National League	5	1	0	0	—		0	0	5	1
Solihull Moors	2021–22	National League	40	3	1	0	—		6 (Note: Four appearances in FA Trophy, two appearances in National League Playoffs)	0	47	3
Solihull Moors	2022–23	National League	33	0	3	1	—		2	1	38	2
Solihull Moors	Total		78	4	4	1	0	0	8	1	90	6
Wrexham	2022–23	National League	12	0	0	0	0	0	0	0	12	0
Wrexham	2023–24	League Two	32	2	2	0	2	0	1	0	37	2
Wrexham	2024–25	League One	40	2	1	0	1	0	3	0	45	2
Wrexham	2025–26	Championship	12	0	2	0	4	0	0	0	18	0
Wrexham	2026–27	Championship	0	0	—		0	0	—		0	0
Wrexham	Total		96	4	5	0	7	0	4	0	112	4
Milton Keynes Dons (loan)	2026–27	League One	0	0	0	0	—		0	0	0	0
Career total			226	12	10	1	8	0	29	4	273	17

== Honours ==
Wrexham

- National League: 2022–23
- EFL League Two second-place promotion: 2023–24
- EFL League One second-place promotion: 2024–25

Individual

- EFL League One Team of the Season: 2024–25
