= 2021–22 Wrexham A.F.C. season =

Welsh football club season

Wrexham A.F.C.
2021–22 season
- Chairman: Rob McElhenney & Ryan Reynolds
- Manager: Phil Parkinson
- Stadium: Racecourse Ground
- National League: 2nd
- Play-offs: Semi-finals
- FA Cup: First round
- FA Trophy: Runners-up
- Top goalscorer: League: Paul Mullin (26); All: Paul Mullin (32)
- Highest home attendance: 10,118 (vs. Stockport County) (League)
- Lowest home attendance: 5,454 (vs. Notts County) (League)
- Average home league attendance: 8,834
- Biggest win: 6–0 (vs Barnet (H), 5 April 2021, National League); 0–5 (vs Aldershot Town (A), 9 November 2021, National League)
- Biggest defeat: 3–0 (vs Dagenham & Redbridge (A), 15 May 2022, National League)
Home colours	Away colours

The 2021–22 season of Wrexham A.F.C. was the football club's 157th season and 14th successive season in the National League; the season covers the period from 1 July 2021 to 30 June 2022. They also played in the English FA Cup and FA Trophy.

Following the takeover by Ryan Reynolds and Rob McElhenney in the previous season, they arranged a FX docu-series called Welcome to Wrexham for the American Disney+ streaming service. A 20-person camera crew follow the players, coaches and fans to film the series for an entire matchday. The takeover from Wrexham Supporters Trust has resulted in investment of £2 million ($2.75m), attracting TikTok as kit sponsor and Expedia for the sponsor at the back of the kit. The owners were in the crowd first time as the club played against Maidenhead United, while they made their first visit to the club's home ground in October 2021 with more than 9,800 supporters attending their introduction before kickoff against Torquay United. Season-ticket sales for the season almost tripled to 5,800 from about 2,000.

On 24 January 2022, the club broke their transfer record since 1978 to sign Ollie Palmer for £300,000.

As of March 2022, the club was negotiating the purchase of the freehold of the Racecourse Ground stadium from Wrexham Glyndŵr University.

== First team squad ==
As of 30 June 2022

No.	Name	Nat.	Pos.	Date of birth (age)	Signed from	Signed in
Goalkeepers
1	Rob Lainton	(England)	GK	12 October 1989 (aged 32)	(England) Port Vale	2018
21	Christian Dibble	(Wales)	GK	11 May 1994 (aged 28)	(England) Nuneaton Borough	2017
23	Lee Camp	(Northern Ireland)	GK	22 August 1984 (aged 37)	Free agent	2022
31	Dawid Szczepaniak	(Poland)	GK	13 April 2000 (aged 22)	(Wales) Cefn Druids	2019
Defenders
2	Reece Hall-Johnson	(Jamaica)	RB	9 May 1995 (aged 27)	(England) Northampton	2020
3	Callum McFadzean	(Scotland)	LB	16 January 1994 (aged 28)	(England) Crewe Alexandra	2022
4	Shaun Brisley	(England)	CB	6 May 1990 (aged 32)	(England) Port Vale	2021
5	Aaron Hayden	(England)	CB	16 January 1997 (aged 25)	(England) Carlisle United	2021
6	Ben Tozer	(England)	CB	1 March 1990 (aged 32)	(England) Cheltenham Town	2021
15	Tyler French	(England)	RB	12 February 1999 (aged 23)	(England) Bradford City	2021
17	Bryce Hosannah	(England)	RB	8 April 1999 (aged 23)	(England) Leeds United U-23s	2021
26	Harry Lennon	(England)	CB	16 December 1994 (aged 27)	(England) Southend United	2021
32	Max Cleworth	(England)	CB	9 August 2002 (aged 19)	Academy	2020
Midfielders
7	Jordan Davies	(Wales)	CM	18 October 1998 (aged 23)	(England) Brighton & Hove Albion	2020
8	Luke Young	(England)	CM	22 February 1993 (aged 29)	(England) Torquay United	2018
12	Dan Jarvis	(England)	CM	17 January 1998 (aged 24)	Academy	2020
18	David Jones	(England)	CM	4 November 1984 (aged 37)	(England) Oldham Athletic	2021
22	Thomas O'Connor	(Republic of Ireland)	CM	21 April 1999 (aged 23)	(England) Burton Albion	2022
30	James Jones	(Scotland)	CM	13 February 1996 (aged 26)	(England) Lincoln City	2021
Forwards
9	Jake Hyde	(England)	CF	1 July 1990 (aged 31)	(England) FC Halifax Town	2021
10	Paul Mullin	(England)	CF	6 November 1994 (aged 27)	(England) Cambridge United	2021
11	Liam McAlinden	(Republic of Ireland)	CF	26 September 1993 (aged 28)	(England) Morecambe	2021
19	Jordan Ponticelli	(England)	CF	10 September 1998 (aged 23)	(England) Coventry City	2020
20	Dior Angus	(England)	CF	18 January 1994 (aged 28)	(England) Barrow	2021
35	Ollie Palmer	(England)	CF	21 January 1992 (aged 30)	(England) AFC Wimbledon	2022
37	Kai Evans	(Wales)	CF	27 January 2004 (aged 18)	Academy	2020
39	Kwame Thomas	(England)	CF	28 September 1995 (aged 26)	(England) Barrow	2020

== Transfers ==
=== Transfers in ===
Date	Pos.	Nat.	Name	From	Fee	Ref
9 July 2021	CF	(England)	Liam McAlinden	(England) Morecambe	Free transfer	
9 July 2021	CB	(England)	Shaun Brisley	(England) Port Vale	Free transfer	
18 July 2021	CF	(England)	Jake Hyde	(England) FC Halifax Town	Undisclosed	
22 July 2021	CB	(England)	Harry Lennon	(England) Southend United	Free transfer	
23 July 2021	CF	(England)	Paul Mullin	(England) Cambridge United	Free transfer	
8 August 2021	CB	(England)	Aaron Hayden	(England) Carlisle United	Undisclosed	
17 August 2021	CM	(England)	David Jones	Free Agent	Free Transfer	
24 August 2021	CM	(Scotland)	James Jones	(England) Lincoln City	Undisclosed	
27 August 2021	CB	(England)	Ben Tozer	(England) Cheltenham Town	Undisclosed	
31 August 2021	RB	(England)	Bryce Hosannah	(England) Leeds United U-23s	Free Transfer	
24 January 2022	CF	(England)	Ollie Palmer	(England) AFC Wimbledon	£300,000	
27 January 2022	LB	(Scotland)	Callum McFadzean	(England) Crewe Alexandra	Undisclosed	
31 January 2022	CM	(Republic of Ireland)	Thomas O'Connor	(England) Burton Albion	Undisclosed	
24 March 2022	GK	(Northern Ireland)	Lee Camp	Free Agent	Free Transfer	

=== New contracts ===
Date	Pos.	Nat.	Name	Contract until	Ref.
30 June 2021	GK	(Wales)	Christian Dibble	30 June 2022	
30 June 2021	LB	(England)	Cameron Green	30 June 2022	
30 June 2021	RB	(England)	Reece Hall-Johnson	30 June 2022	
30 June 2021	GK	(England)	Rob Lainton	30 June 2022	
30 June 2021	CB	(England)	Shaun Pearson	30 June 2022	
30 June 2021	LB	(England)	Jamie Reckord	30 June 2022	
30 June 2021	CM	(England)	Devonte Redmond	30 June 2022	
30 June 2021	CM	(England)	Luke Young	30 June 2022	

=== Released / Out of Contract ===
Date	Pos.	Nat.	Name	Subsequent club	Join date	Ref.
30 June 2021	RB	(England)	Mark Carrington	(England) Kidderminster Harriers	6 July 2021	
30 June 2021	CF	(England)	Bobby Grant	(England) Radcliffe	1 July 2021	
30 June 2021	CM	(England)	Jay Harris	(England) Warrington Town	29 August 2021	
30 June 2021	RB	(England)	James Horsfield	(England) Chester	17 September 2021	
30 June 2021	CB	(England)	Fiacre Kelleher	(England) Bradford City	1 July 2021	
30 June 2021	CM	(England)	Paul Rutherford	(Wales) Bala Town	1 July 2021	
30 June 2021	CF	(England)	Chris Sang	(Wales) Bala Town	1 July 2021	
30 June 2021	CB	(England)	Theo Vassell	(England) Salford City	12 November 2021	

== Competitions ==
=== Overall record ===
Competition	First match	Last match	Starting round	Final position	Record							
Competition	First match	Last match	Starting round	Final position	Pld	W	D	L	GF	GA	GD	Win %
National League	21 August 2021	15 May 2022	Matchday 1	Runners-up	44	26	10	8	91	46	+45	59.09
National League Play-offs	28 May 2022	28 May 2022	Semi-final	Semi-final	1	0	0	1	4	5	−1	0.00
FA Cup	6 October 2021	6 November 2021	Fourth qualifying round	First round	3	1	1	1	4	3	+1	33.33
FA Trophy	18 December 2021	22 May 2022	Third round	Runners-up	6	5	0	1	17	3	+14	83.33
Total					54	32	11	11	116	57	+59	59.26

Source: Competitions

=== National League ===
==== League table ====
Pos	Team	Pld	W	D	L	GF	GA	GD	Pts	Promotion, qualification or relegation
1	Stockport County (C, P)	44	30	4	10	87	38	+49	94	Promotion to EFL League Two
2	Wrexham	44	26	10	8	91	46	+45	88	Qualification for the National League play-off semi-finals
3	Solihull Moors	44	25	12	7	83	45	+38	87	Qualification for the National League play-off semi-finals
4	FC Halifax Town	44	25	9	10	62	35	+27	84	Qualification for the National League play-off quarter-finals
5	Notts County	44	24	10	10	81	52	+29	82	Qualification for the National League play-off quarter-finals

Source: National League official site
Rules for classification: 1) Points; 2) Goal difference; 3) Number of goals scored; 4) Number of matches won; 5) Head-to-head results
(C) Champions; (P) Promoted

==== Matches ====
On Thursday, 7 July 2021, the National League fixtures were revealed.

21 August 2021 1	Solihull Moors	2–2	Wrexham	Solihull
16:00 BST	Joe Sbarra 18', 90+4'	Report	Paul Mullin 26' (pen.); David Jones 30'; Reece Hall-Johnson (yellow card) 58'	Stadium: The Automated Technology Group Stadium; Attendance: 2,196; Referee: Steven Copeland

28 August 2021 2	Eastleigh	0–2	Wrexham	Eastleigh
16:00 BST	Jake Hesketh (yellow card) 28'	Report	Harry Lennon (yellow card) 8'; Jake Hyde 12', 42'; Luke Young (yellow card) 71'; Jordan Davies (yellow card) 88'	Stadium: Silverlake Stadium; Attendance: 2,572; Referee: Robert Whitton

30 August 2021 3	Wrexham	1–1	Notts County	Wrexham
20:30 BST	Paul Mullin 53'; Jordan Davies (yellow card) 65'	Report	Kyle Wootton 44'; Ed Francis (yellow card) 52'; Jim O'Brien (yellow card) 55'; Callum Roberts (yellow card) 64'; Rúben Rodrigues (yellow card) 85'	Stadium: Racecourse Ground; Attendance: 5,454; Referee: Thomas Parsons

4 September 2021 4	Southend United	2–2	Wrexham	Southend-on-Sea
16:00 BST	Sam Dalby 25'; Rhys Murphy 52'	Report	James Jones (yellow card) 36'; Jamie Reckord 54'; Dior Angus 66'; Jordan Davies (yellow card) 90+3'	Stadium: Roots Hall; Attendance: 6,036; Referee: Alan Dale

11 September 2021 5	Wrexham	1–0	Woking	Wrexham
16:00 BST	Jordan Davies 40'; Tyler French (yellow card) 53'; David Jones (yellow card) 74,' (yellow-red card) 76'	Report	Joe McNerney (yellow card) 36'; Jordan Maguire-Drew (yellow card) 57'; Solomon Nwabuokei (yellow card) 62'; Josh Casey (yellow card) 62'	Stadium: Racecourse Ground; Attendance: 8,242; Referee: Paul Marsden

14 September 2021 6	Grimsby Town	3–1	Wrexham	Cleethorpes
16:00 BST	Ryan Taylor 27'; Luke Waterfall 34'; Érico Sousa (yellow card) 60'; Harry Clifton (yellow card) 66'; Max Wright 90'	Report	Jake Hyde 22'; Devonte Redmond (yellow card) 25'; Tyler French (yellow card) 49'	Stadium: Blundell Park; Attendance: 6.663; Referee: Adam Herczeg

18 September 2021 7	Wrexham	1–0	Dagenham & Redbridge	Wrexham
16:00 BST	Paul Mullin 8'	Report	Mo Sagaf (yellow card) 11'; Matt Robinson (yellow card) 73'	Stadium: Racecourse Ground; Attendance: 8,033; Referee: Lewis Smith

25 September 2021 8	Stockport County	2–1	Wrexham	Stockport
16:00 BST	Paddy Madden 48', (yellow card) 72'; Ryan Rydel 80'; Ben Whitfield (yellow card) 80'; Macauley Southam-Hales (yellow card) 83'; Alex Reid (yellow card) 86'	Report	Paul Mullin 1', (yellow card) 2'; Harry Lennon (yellow card) 90+2'	Stadium: Edgeley Park; Attendance: 7,771; Referee: Lewis Smith

5 October 2021 9	Wrexham	1–1	Chesterfield	Wrexham
20:45 BST	Jordan Davies (yellow card) 45+1'; Paul Mullin 84'; Bryce Hosannah (yellow card) 90+6'	Report	Fraser Kerr 5', (yellow card) 75'; Laurence Maguire (yellow card) 20'; Jim Kellermann (yellow card) 45+1'; Stefan Payne (yellow card) 90+2'	Stadium: Racecourse Ground; Attendance: 9,147; Referee: Martin Woods

23 October 2021 10	Barnet	0–3	Wrexham	London
16:00 BST		Report	Paul Mullin 24'; Aaron Hayden 28'; Shaun Brisley 55'; Ben Tozer (yellow card) 71'	Stadium: The Hive Stadium; Attendance: 2,237; Referee: Tom Reeves

26 October 2021 11	Maidenhead United	3–2	Wrexham	Maidenhead
20:45 BST	Kane Ferdinand 17'; Jay Mingi 23'; Josh Kelly 77'	Report	Bryce Hosannah (red card) 31'; Paul Mullin 45'; Jordan Davies 57'; Ben Tozer (yellow card) 71'	Stadium: York Road; Attendance: 1,692; Referee: Matthew Russell

30 October 2021 12	Wrexham	1–1	Torquay United	Wrexham
16:00 BST	Harry Lennon 4', (yellow card) 47'; Rob Lainton (yellow card) 58'	Report	Harry Perritt (yellow card) 53'; Connor Lemonheigh-Evans 84'; Dean Moxey (yellow card) 90+6'	Stadium: Racecourse Ground; Attendance: 9,813; Referee: Benjamin Speedie

9 November 2021 13	Aldershot Town	0–5	Wrexham	Aldershot
20:45 BST	Corie Andrews (yellow card) 20'; Scott Wagstaff (yellow card) 33'; Christian Oxlade-Chamberlain (yellow card) 42'	Report	Aaron Hayden 40'; Harry Lennon 43'; Reece Hall-Johnson 58'; Jordan Ponticelli 61'; Jordan Davies 68'	Stadium: Recreation Ground; Attendance: 1,639; Referee: Sunny Sukhvir Gill

13 November 2021 14	King's Lynn Town	2–6	Wrexham	King's Lynn
16:00 BST	Michael Clunan 12'; Malachi Linton (yellow card) 45', (goal) 86'; Pierce Bird (yellow card) 66'	Report	Aaron Hayden 22'; Jordan Davies 52'; Paul Mullin 63'; Reece Hall-Johnson (yellow card) 66'; Jordan Ponticelli 76'; Daniel Jarvis 90'; Cameron Green 90+4'	Stadium: The Walks; Attendance: 1,070; Referee: Rob Massey-Ellis

20 November 2021 15	Wrexham	0–0	Wealdstone	Wrexham
16:00 BST	Paul Mullin (yellow card) 65'; James Jones (yellow card) 70'	Report	Ashley Charles (yellow card) 28'; Charlie Cooper (yellow card) 38'; Alex Dyer (yellow card) 60'; Jack Cook (yellow card) 90+1'; Connor McAvoy (yellow card) 90+2'	Stadium: Racecourse Ground; Attendance: 8,592; Referee: Andrew Miller

23 November 2021 16	FC Halifax Town	1–2	Wrexham	Halifax
20:45 BST	Niall Maher (yellow card) 48'; Jordan Slew 67'; Elliot Newby (yellow card) 88'	Report	Bryce Hosannah (yellow card) 61'; James Jones 83'; Aaron Hayden (yellow card) 84'; Paul Mullin 90+1', (yellow card) 90+2'	Stadium: The Shay; Attendance: 3,344; Referee: Martin Woods

27 November 2021 17	Wrexham	2–0	Bromley	Wrexham
16:00 BST	Reece Hall-Johnson 33'; Paul Mullin 60'	Report	Liam Trotter (red card) 8'	Stadium: Racecourse Ground; Attendance: 8,156; Referee: Jacob Miles

30 November 2021 18	Wrexham	0–2	Yeovil Town	Wrexham
20:45 BST	Liam McAlinden (red card) 33'; Harry Lennon (yellow card) 60'	Report	Dan Moss (yellow card) 44'; Josh Staunton 64'; Sonny Blu Lo-Everton 83'	Stadium: Racecourse Ground; Attendance: 8,047; Referee: David Richardson

4 December 2021 19	Dover Athletic	0–1	Wrexham	Dover
16:00 BST	Sam Wood (yellow card) 31'; Nana Ofori-Twumasi (yellow card) 82'	Report	Harry Lennon (yellow card) 57'; Jordan Davies 84'; Rob Lainton (yellow card) 90+2'	Stadium: The Perrys Crabble Stadium; Attendance: 838; Referee: Daniel Middleton

11 December 2021 20	Wrexham	1–0	Weymouth	Wrexham
18:20 BST	Jordan Davies 29'	Report	Tom Blair (yellow card) 72'	Stadium: Racecourse Ground; Attendance: 7,530; Referee: Thomas Parsons

28 December 2021 21	Altrincham	0–2	Wrexham	Altrincham
16:00 BST	Dean Furman (yellow card) 76'	Report	Jordan Davies (yellow card) 13'; Aaron Hayden 24'; Bryce Hosannah 38'; Rob Lainton (yellow card) 89'	Stadium: J. Davidson Stadium; Attendance: 3,145; Referee: Thomas Parsons

2 January 2022 22	Notts County	3–1	Wrexham	Nottingham
16:00 BST	Kyle Wootton 10', 39'; Kyle Cameron (yellow card) 17'; Elisha Sam (yellow card) 49'; Jayden Richardson 67'; Alex Lacey (yellow card) 75'	Report	Reece Hall-Johnson 4'; Harry Lennon (red card) 9'; Bryce Hosannah (yellow card) 21'; Ben Tozer (yellow card) 68'; Aaron Hayden (yellow card) 68'	Stadium: Meadow Lane; Attendance: 8,890; Referee: Paul Marsden

22 January 2022 23	Yeovil Town	1–2	Wrexham	Yeovil
16:00 BST	Tom Knowles 14'; Alex Bradley (yellow card) 54'; Adi Yussuf (yellow card) 86'	Report	Paul Mullin 59'; Morgan Williams 79' (o.g.); Jordan Ponticelli (yellow card) 90+5'	Stadium: Huish Park; Attendance: 2,988; Referee: Sunny Sukhvir Gill

25 January 2022 24	Wrexham	1–0	Grimsby Town	Wrexham
20:45 BST	Ollie Palmer 35'	Report		Stadium: Racecourse Ground; Attendance: 8,434; Referee: Scott Simpson

29 January 2022 25	Wrexham	1–1	Maidenhead United	Wrexham
16:00 BST	Paul Mullin (red card) 4'; Aaron Hayden 17'; Liam McAlinden (yellow card) 55'	Report	Sam Beckwith (yellow card) 14'; Shawn McCoulsky 90+2'; Shaun Donnellan (yellow card) 90+2'	Stadium: Racecourse Ground; Attendance: 8,759; Referee: David Richardson

5 February 2022 26	Torquay United	1–0	Wrexham	Torquay
16:00 BST	Asa Hall 8'; Dean Moxey (yellow card) 38'; Alex Bradley (yellow card) 54'; Stephen Wearne (yellow card) 69'; Tom Lapslie (yellow card) 83'; Dan Holman (yellow card) 87'	Report	James Jones (yellow card) 8'; Jordan Ponticelli (yellow card) 22'; Ben Tozer (yellow card) 87'	Stadium: Plainmoor; Attendance: 3,181; Referee: Aji Ajibola

19 February 2022 27	Wealdstone	1–2	Wrexham	Ruislip
16:00 BST	Jack Cook (yellow card) 5,' (yellow-red card) 86'; Connor McAvoy (yellow card) 25'; Rhys Browne 71'; George Wickens (yellow card) 82'	Report	Jordan Ponticelli (yellow card) 22'; Jordan Davies (yellow card) 25', (goal) 88'; Ben Tozer (yellow card) 45'; Reece Hall-Johnson 90+5', (yellow card) 90+6'	Stadium: The Freebets.co.uk Stadium; Attendance: 1,991; Referee: Tom Bishop

22 February 2022 28	Chesterfield	0–2	Wrexham	Chesterfield
20:45 BST	Tyrone Williams (yellow card) 63'; Tom Whelan (yellow card) 90+3'	Report	Ollie Palmer 58', 68'; Aaron Hayden (yellow card) 75'; Rob Lainton (yellow card) 90+6'	Stadium: Proact Stadium; Attendance: 7,854; Referee: Garreth Rhodes

26 February 2022 29	Wrexham	4–1	Aldershot Town	Wrexham
16:00 BST	Paul Mullin 35', 68'; Jordan Davies 49'; Ollie Palmer 57'; Luke Young (yellow card) 61'	Report	Colin Daniel (yellow card) 42'; Giles Phillips 90+2'	Stadium: Racecourse Ground; Attendance: 8,475; Referee: Thomas Kirk

1 March 2022 30	Wrexham	2–0	King's Lynn Town	Wrexham
20:45 BST	Jordan Davies 11'; Paul Mullin 31'; Ollie Palmer (yellow card) 83'	Report	Jak Hickman (yellow card) 63'	Stadium: Racecourse Ground; Attendance: 8,173; Referee: Aaron Jackson

8 March 2022 31	Wrexham	4–2	Boreham Wood	Wrexham
20:45 BST	Ollie Palmer 15'; Aaron Hayden 61'; James Jones 66'; Paul Mullin 70'	Report	David Stephens (yellow card) 32'; Scott Boden 38', (yellow card) 38'; Connor Smith (yellow card) 42'; Tyrone Marsh 68'	Stadium: Racecourse Ground; Attendance: 8,705; Referee: Lewis Smith

19 March 2022 32	Bromley	0–0	Wrexham	Bromley
16:00 BST		Report	Luke Young (yellow card) 65'	Stadium: H2T Group Stadium; Attendance: 3,123; Referee: Adrian Quelch

22 March 2022 33	Wrexham	3–1	FC Halifax Town	Wrexham
20:45 BST	Paul Mullin 6', (yellow card) 34'; Ollie Palmer 28'; James Jones 87'	Report	Niall Maher (yellow card) 34'; Zak Dearnley 88'	Stadium: Racecourse Ground; Attendance: 8,711; Referee: Martin Woods

26 March 2022 34	Wrexham	6–5	Dover Athletic	Wrexham
16:00 BST	Paul Mullin 7'; James Jones 20'; Ollie Palmer 66', 69'; Jordan Davies 90+1'; Daniel Jarvis 90+8'	Report	George Wilkinson 22'; Alfie Pavey 28'; Michael Gyasi 51', 54', 63'; Adam Parkes (yellow card) 83'	Stadium: Racecourse Ground; Attendance: 8,572; Referee: David Richardson

5 April 2022 35	Wrexham	6–0	Barnet	Wrexham
20:45 BST	Ollie Palmer 14'; Paul Mullin 24'; Jordan Davies 44'; Ben Tozer 50'; Reece Hall-Johnson 73'; Liam McAlinden 85'	Report	Reiss Greenidge (yellow card) 24'; Teddy Howe (yellow card) 56'	Stadium: Racecourse Ground; Attendance: 8,868; Referee: Michael Barlow

9 April 2022 36	Wrexham	3–2	Eastleigh	Wrexham
16:00 BST	James Jones (yellow card) 18'; Aaron Hayden 27'; Reece Hall-Johnson (yellow card) 49'; Paul Mullin 77', 90+5' (pen.)	Report	Vincent Harper (yellow card) 15'; Danny Whitehall 26', 65'; Brennan Camp (yellow card) 52'; Cav Miley (yellow card) 60'	Stadium: Racecourse Ground; Attendance: 9,163; Referee: Andrew Miller

15 April 2022 37	Wrexham	1–1	Solihull Moors	Wrexham
16:00 BST	Paul Mullin (yellow card) 28'; Ollie Palmer 58'	Report	Joe Sbarra (yellow card) 36', (goal) 56'; Lois Maynard (yellow card) 85'	Stadium: Racecourse Ground; Attendance: 9,949; Referee: Garreth Rhodes

18 April 2022 38	Wrexham	4–0	Altrincham	Wrexham
16:00 BST	Jordan Davies 2'; Paul Mullin 28', 33'; Ollie Palmer 35'; Luke Young (yellow card) 56'; James Jones (yellow card) 72'	Report	Eddy Jones (yellow card) 41'; Elliot Osborne (yellow card) 65'	Stadium: Racecourse Ground; Attendance: 10,022; Referee: Thomas Parsons

23 April 2022 39	Woking	2–1	Wrexham	Woking
18:20 BST	Joe McNerney (yellow card) 35'; Tyreke Johnson 44', (yellow card) 78'; Max Kretzschmar 65'; Jamar Loza (yellow card) 87'; Jack Roles (yellow card) 90+4'	Report	Liam McAlinden (yellow card) 63'; Aaron Hayden (yellow card) 73'; Jamar Loza 86' (o.g.)	Stadium: Kingfield Stadium; Attendance: 2,697; Referee: Robert Whitton

26 April 2022 40	Weymouth	1–6	Wrexham	Weymouth
19:45 BST	Tom Bearwish 20'; Matt Buse (yellow card) 89'	Report	Jordan Davies 48', 66'; Paul Mullin 49', 83'; James Jones 56'; Ollie Palmer 84'	Stadium: Bob Lucas Stadium; Attendance: 921; Referee: Adrian Quelch

30 April 2022 41	Wrexham	1–0	Southend United	Wrexham
15:00 BST	Ollie Palmer 47'	Report		Stadium: Racecourse Ground; Attendance: 9,200; Referee: Matthew Dicicco

2 May 2022 42	Boreham Wood	1–1	Wrexham	Borehamwood
16:00 BST	Jamal Fyfield (red card) 38'; Will Evans (yellow card) 41'; Tyrone Marsh 89'	Report	Paul Mullin 54'	Stadium: Meadow Park; Attendance: 2,053; Referee: David Rock

8 May 2022 43	Wrexham	3–0	Stockport County	Wrexham
13:30 BST	Ollie Palmer 34', 47'; Paul Mullin 45'; Max Cleworth (yellow card) 69'; Ben Tozer (yellow card) 90+1'	Report	Scott Quigley (yellow card) 39'; Myles Hippolyte (yellow card) 90+3'	Stadium: Racecourse Ground; Attendance: 10,118; Referee: Martin Woods

15 May 2022 44	Dagenham & Redbridge	3–0	Wrexham	Dagenham
16:00 BST	Junior Morias 55'; Matt Robinson (yellow card) 59', (goal) 90'; Paul McCallum 80'	Report	Ben Tozer (yellow card) 72'; Max Cleworth (yellow card) 75'	Stadium: Victoria Road; Attendance: 3,470; Referee: Adam Herczeg

==== Playoffs ====
28 May 2022 Semi-final	Wrexham	4–5 (a.e.t.)	Grimsby Town	Wrexham
12:30 BST	Mullin 13' (pen.), 65'; Tozer (yellow card) 45+2', (goal) 63'; Davies 80'; Young (yellow card) 98'; Palmer (yellow card) 105'	Report	McAtee 15'; Amos (yellow card) 24'; Waterfall (yellow card) 28', (goal) 47', 119'; Taylor (yellow card) 36', (goal) 72'; Dieseruvwe 78'	Stadium: Racecourse Ground; Attendance: 9,734; Referee: Adam Herczeg

=== FA Cup ===
The fourth qualifying round draw was made on 4 October 2021.

6 October 2021 Fourth qualifying round	Marine	1–1	Wrexham	Crosby
	Owen Watkinson 78'	Report	Jordan Davies 90+5'	Stadium: Rossett Park; Attendance: 1,941

19 October 2021 Fourth qualifying round replay	Wrexham	2–0	Marine	Nantwich
	Paul Mullin 21', 47'	Report		Stadium: Weaver Stadium; Attendance: 1,192

The first round draw was made on 17 October 2021.

6 November 2021 First round	Harrogate Town	2–1	Wrexham	Harrogate
15:00 GMT	Power 73'; Orsi 78'	Report	Ponticelli 38'	Stadium: Wetherby Road; Attendance: 2,403; Referee: Scott Oldham

=== FA Trophy ===
18 December 2021 Third round	Wrexham	5–0	Gloucester City	Wrexham
15:00 GMT	Jordan Davies 24', 32'; Max Cleworth 48'; Kwame Thomas 56'; James Jones 71'	Report		Stadium: Racecourse Ground; Attendance: 1,823

15 January 2022 Fourth round	Wrexham	5–1	Folkestone Invicta	Wrexham
17:30 GMT	Jordan Ponticelli 30', 50'; Jordan Davies 72'; Bryce Hosannah 77'; Kwame Thomas 80'	Report	Adeoye Yusuff 74'	Stadium: Racecourse Ground

12 February 2022 Fifth round	Wrexham	3–0	Boreham Wood	Wrexham
15:00 GMT	Ollie Palmer 19'; Jordan Davies 27'; Aaron Hayden 90+1'	Report		Stadium: Racecourse Ground; Attendance: 3,444

11 March 2022 Quarter-final	Notts County	1–2	Wrexham	Nottingham
19:45 GMT	Connell Rawlinson 19'	Report	Daniel Jarvis 43'; James Jones 89'	Stadium: Meadow Lane; Attendance: 3,170

2 April 2022 Semi-final	Wrexham	2–0	Stockport County	Wrexham
12:30 GMT	Paul Mullin 90+1', 90+5'	Report		Stadium: Racecourse Ground; Attendance: 8,703

22 May 2022 Final	Bromley	1–0	Wrexham	Wembley Stadium, London
16:15 BST	Michael Cheek 64'	Report		Attendance: 46,111; Referee: Thomas Bramall
