= 2022 FA Trophy final =

2022 FA Trophy Final
- Event: 2021–22 FA Trophy
Wrexham	Bromley
0	1
- Date: 22 May 2022
- Venue: Wembley Stadium, London
- Referee: Thomas Bramall
- Attendance: 46,111

The 2022 FA Trophy Final was an association football match played at Wembley Stadium, London, on 22 May 2022. It was contested between National League teams Wrexham and Bromley. The match decided the winners of the 2021–22 FA Trophy, a knockout tournament comprising clubs from teams at levels 5–8 of the English National League System. It was Wrexham's third appearance in the final and the second for Bromley. Bromley won the match 1-0 therefore claiming the trophy for the first time.

The match is featured in episode 16 of the first season of the docuseries Welcome to Wrexham.

== Route to the Final ==
=== Wrexham ===
18 December 2021 Third Round	Wrexham	5–0	Gloucester City	Wrexham
15:00 GMT	Davies 24', 32'; Cleworth 48'; Thomas 56'; J.Jones 71'	Report		Stadium: Racecourse Ground; Attendance: 1,823

15 January 2022 Fourth Round	Wrexham	5–1	Folkestone Invicta	Wrexham
15:00 GMT	Ponticelli 30', 50'; Davies 72'; Hosannah 77'; Thomas 80'	Report	Yusuff 74'	Stadium: Racecourse Ground; Attendance: 0

12 February 2022 Fifth Round	Wrexham	3–0	Boreham Wood	Wrexham
15:00 GMT	Palmer 19'; Davies 27'; Hayden 90+1'	Report		Stadium: Racecourse Ground; Attendance: 3,444

11 March 2022 Quarter-finals	Notts County	1–2	Wrexham	Nottingham
19:45 GMT	Rawlinson 30'	Report	Jarvis 43'; J.Jones 89'	Stadium: Meadow Lane; Attendance: 3,170

2 April 2022 Semi-finals	Wrexham	2–0	Stockport County	Wrexham
12:30 BST	Mullin 90+1', 90+5'	Report		Stadium: Racecourse Ground; Attendance: 8,703

=== Bromley ===
18 December 2021 Third Round	Dover Athletic	0–1	Bromley	River
15:00 GMT		Report	Lovatt 28'	Stadium: Crabble Athletic Ground; Attendance: 457

15 January 2022 Fourth Round	Aldershot Town	0–2	Bromley	Aldershot
15:00 GMT		Report	Partington 55'; Alexander 85'	Stadium: Recreation Ground; Attendance: 1,194

12 February 2022 Fifth Round	Tonbridge Angels	1–1 (2–3 p)	Bromley	Tonbridge
15:00 GMT	Hudson (red card) 73'; Turner 88'		Francis 81'	Stadium: Longmead Stadium; Attendance: 2,061
	Penalties
	Parkinson (penalty missed); Wood (penalty scored); Olatude (penalty missed); Beere (penalty scored); Turner (penalty missed)		Bush (penalty missed); Partington (penalty scored); Cawley (penalty scored); Coulson (penalty scored)

12 March 2022 Quarter-finals	Bromley	3–1	Solihull Moors	Bromley
15:00 GMT	Cheek 13', 53'; Alabi 85'	Report	Maycock 2'	Stadium: Hayes Lane; Attendance: 1,965

2 April 2022 Semi-finals	Bromley	3–1	York City	Bromley
15:00 BST	Cheek 61', 81'; Alabi 90+2'	Report	Willoughby 2'	Stadium: Hayes Lane; Attendance: 4,423

== Match ==
=== Details ===
22 May 2022
16:15 BST

Wrexham	0–1	Bromley
	Report	Cheek 64'

Wembley Stadium, London
Attendance: 46,111
Referee: Thomas Bramall

GK	21	(Wales) Christian Dibble
DF	11	(Republic of Ireland) Liam McAlinden	(substituted off) 75'
DF	32	(Wales) Max Cleworth
DF	6	(England) Ben Tozer
DF	22	(Republic of Ireland) Thomas O'Connor	(substituted off) 75'
DF	3	(Scotland) Callum McFadzean
MF	7	(Wales) Jordan Davies
MF	30	(Scotland) James Jones
MF	8	(England) Luke Young	(substituted off) 86'
FW	10	(England) Paul Mullin
FW	35	(England) Ollie Palmer
Substitutes:
GK	23	(Northern Ireland) Lee Camp
DF	2	(England) Reece Hall-Johnson	(substituted on) 75'
DF	15	(England) Tyler French
MF	12	(England) Daniel Jarvis	(substituted on) 75'
MF	18	(England) David Jones
FW	9	(England) Jake Hyde	(substituted on) 86'
FW	19	(England) Jordan Ponticelli
Manager: (England) Phil Parkinson

GK	13	(England) Ellery Balcombe
DF	6	(England) Omar Sowunmi	(substituted off) 45+6'
DF	17	(England) Byron Webster
DF	5	(England) Chris Bush
MF	7	(England) Luke Coulson
MF	4	(England) Billy Bingham	(substituted off) 76'
MF	21	(England) James Vennings
MF	19	(England) Harry Forster
FW	18	(England) Corey Whitely
FW	9	(England) Michael Cheek	64' (substituted off) 80'
FW	37	(Iraq) Ali Al-Hamadi
Substitutes:
GK	1	(England) Mark Cousins
DF	2	(Wales) Joe Partington	(substituted on) 45+6'
DF	34	(England) Jack Cawley
MF	16	(England) Liam Trotter	(substituted on) 80'
FW	10	(England) James Alabi
FW	11	(England) Louis Dennis
FW	14	(England) Mason Bloomfield	(substituted on) 80'
Manager: (England) Andy Woodman

Man of the match:

Match officials

- Assistant referees:
- Fourth official:

Match rules

- 90 minutes.
- 30 minutes of extra-time if necessary.
- Penalty shoot-out if scores still level.
- Seven named substitutes.
- Maximum of three substitutions plus one more allowed in extra time
