= 2022–23 Wrexham A.F.C. season =

Welsh football club season

Wrexham A.F.C.
2022–23 season
- Owner: RR McReynolds Company LLC (Ryan Reynolds and Rob McElhenney)
- Chairmen: Rob McElhenney & Ryan Reynolds
- Manager: Phil Parkinson
- Stadium: Racecourse Ground
- National League: 1st (promoted)
- FA Cup: Fourth round
- FA Trophy: Fourth round
- Top goalscorer: League: Paul Mullin (38); All: Paul Mullin (47)
- Highest home attendance: 10,161 (vs York City, 25 March 2023, National League)
- Lowest home attendance: 9,805 (vs Gateshead, 30 August 2022, National League)
- Average home league attendance: 9,973 (22 April 2023)
- Biggest win: 6–0 (vs Torquay United (H), 24 September 2022, National League)
- Biggest defeat: 1–3 (vs Halifax Town (A), 7 April 2023, National League)
Home colours	Away colours	Third colours

The 2022–23 season was the 158th season in the existence of Wrexham A.F.C. and their 15th consecutive season in the National League. Wrexham were one of the five Welsh football clubs in the English football league system. The season was unusual in that the fixture dates of domestic and European competitions were consistently postponed to accommodate the coverage of the 2022 FIFA World Cup played in November and December 2022 in Qatar.

Wrexham kicked off the season by beating Eastleigh 2–1 in the National League. Wrexham has traded the top spot back and forth with Notts County throughout the season. On 7 April, leading up to their second match against one another, Wrexham was second in the league, tied with Notts County at 100 points, behind on goal difference but with a game in hand. The season saw a persistent rise in popularity of their matches, with attendance close to stadium capacity at every match. The Red Dragons successfully gained promotion to the EFL League Two title for the first time in 15 years, in a closely fought title race with Notts County. They won the league by 4 points on the penultimate matchday, coming back from a first minute goal by Boreham Wood, to score three goals in the remainder of the match, with goals from talisman Paul Mullin and Elliot Lee.

Wrexham also participated in the FA Trophy and the FA Cup. In the FA Trophy, they were knocked out in the fourth round by Altrincham, on penalties. In the FA Cup, they were knocked out in a fourth round replay against EFL Championship side Sheffield United.

The season was chronicled in Season 2 of the documentary series Welcome to Wrexham.

== Kits ==
Supplier: Macron / Shirt front sponsor: TikTok / Shirt back sponsor: Expedia / Sleeve sponsor: Vistaprint / Shorts sponsor: Ifor Williams Trailers

Home	Away	Third

== First-team squad ==
As of match played 30 June 2023

No.	Player	Nat.	Pos.	Date of birth (age)	Signed from	Signed in	Contract ends	Apps.	Goals
Goalkeepers
1	Rob Lainton	(England)	GK	12 October 1989 (aged 33)	(England) Port Vale	2018	2024	143	0
12	Ben Foster	(England)	GK	3 April 1983 (aged 40)	Free agent	2023	2023	31	0
21	Mark Howard	(England)	GK	21 September 1986 (aged 36)	(England) Carlisle United	2022	2023	39	0
23	Kai Calderbank-Park	(Australia)	GK	16 January 2001 (aged 22)	(Wales) Connah's Quay Nomads	2022	2023	0	0
31	Rory Watson	(England)	GK	5 February 1996 (aged 27)	(England) Scunthorpe United	2022	2023	0	0
Defenders
2	Reece Hall-Johnson	(Jamaica)	DF	9 May 1995 (aged 28)	(England) Northampton Town	2020	2023	77	13
3	Callum McFadzean	(Scotland)	DF	16 January 1994 (aged 29)	(England) Crewe Alexandra	2022	2024	52	0
4	Ben Tozer (vice-captain)	(England)	DF	1 March 1990 (aged 33)	(England) Cheltenham Town	2021	2024	106	6
5	Aaron Hayden	(England)	DF	16 January 1997 (aged 26)	(England) Carlisle United	2021	2024	77	19
6	Jordan Tunnicliffe	(England)	DF	28 October 1993 (aged 29)	(England) Crawley Town	2022	2024	31	2
15	Eoghan O'Connell	(Republic of Ireland)	DF	13 August 1995 (aged 27)	(England) Charlton Athletic	2023	2025	15	2
17	Bryce Hosannah	(England)	DF	8 April 1999 (aged 24)	(England) Leeds United	2021	2024	43	2
19	Jacob Mendy	(The Gambia)	DF	27 December 1996 (aged 26)	(England) Boreham Wood	2022	2025	32	4
24	Scott Butler	(Wales)	DF	30 December 2002 (aged 20)	(Wales) Swansea City	2022	2023	1	0
25	Ryan Austin	(Wales)	DF	7 October 2002 (aged 20)	Academy	2021	2023	1	0
26	Harry Lennon	(England)	DF	16 December 1994 (aged 28)	(England) Southend United	2021	2023	23	2
32	Max Cleworth	(England)	DF	9 August 2002 (aged 20)	Academy	2021	2025	68	1
34	Aaron James	(England)	DF	30 June 2005 (aged 18)	Academy	2021	2023	1	0
39	Dan Davies	(Wales)	DF	20 November 2004 (aged 18)	Academy	2022	2023	0	0
Midfielders
7	Jordan Davies	(Wales)	MF	18 October 1998 (aged 24)	(England) Brighton & Hove Albion	2020	2025	117	33
8	Luke Young (captain)	(England)	MF	22 February 1993 (aged 30)	(England) Torquay United	2018	2024	226	20
14	Anthony Forde	(Republic of Ireland)	MF	16 November 1993 (aged 29)	(England) Oxford United	2022	2024	39	3
20	Andy Cannon	(England)	MF	14 March 1996 (aged 27)	(England) Hull City	2022	2025	19	0
22	Thomas O'Connor	(Republic of Ireland)	MF	21 April 1999 (aged 24)	(England) Burton Albion	2022	2025	41	7
29	Ryan Barnett	(England)	MF	23 September 1999 (aged 23)	(England) Solihull Moors	2023	2025	12	0
30	James Jones	(Scotland)	MF	13 February 1996 (aged 27)	(England) Lincoln City	2021	2024	100	12
36	Will Mountfield	(England)	MF	18 September 2003 (aged 19)	Academy	2021	2023	0	0
37	Kai Evans	(Wales)	MF	27 January 2004 (aged 19)	Academy	2022	2023	2	0
38	Elliot Lee	(England)	MF	16 December 1994 (aged 28)	(England) Luton Town	2022	2025	52	15
41	David Jones	(England)	MF	4 November 1984 (aged 38)	(England) Oldham Athletic	2021	2023	5	1
Forwards
9	Ollie Palmer	(England)	FW	21 January 1992 (aged 31)	(England) AFC Wimbledon	2022	2025	78	33
10	Paul Mullin	(England)	FW	6 November 1994 (aged 28)	(England) Cambridge United	2021	2025	97	79
11	Liam McAlinden	(Republic of Ireland)	FW	26 September 1993 (aged 29)	(England) Morecambe	2021	2023	58	1
16	Billy Waters	(England)	FW	15 October 1994 (aged 28)	(England) Barrow	2023	2025	1	0
18	Sam Dalby	(England)	FW	7 December 1999 (aged 23)	(England) Southend United	2022	2024	49	8
27	Jake Bickerstaff	(England)	FW	11 September 2001 (aged 21)	Academy	2021	2024	13	3
33	Daniel Jones	(Wales)	FW	13 April 2001 (aged 22)	Academy	2021	2023	0	0
40	Louis Lloyd	(Wales)	FW	15 October 2003 (aged 19)	(England) Shrewsbury Town	2022	2023	0	0
Out on loan
–	Jake Hyde	(England)	FW	1 July 1990 (aged 32)	(England) Halifax Town	2021	2023	17	3
35	Tom Jenkins	(England)	MF	6 September 2003 (aged 19)	Academy	2021	2023	0	0

== Transfers ==
=== In ===
Date	Pos.	Nat.	Name	Club	Fee	Ref.
1 July 2022	DF	(England)	Jordan Tunnicliffe	(England) Crawley Town	Free	
5 July 2022	GK	(England)	Mark Howard	(England) Carlisle United	Free	
8 July 2022	MF	(England)	Elliot Lee	(England) Luton Town	Free	
28 July 2022	MF	(Republic of Ireland)	Anthony Forde	(England) Oxford United	Undisclosed	
1 August 2022	FW	(England)	Sam Dalby	(England) Southend United	Undisclosed	
1 August 2022	DF	(The Gambia)	Jacob Mendy	(England) Boreham Wood	Undisclosed	
4 August 2022	GK	(England)	Rory Watson	(England) Scunthorpe United	Free	
16 September 2022	GK	(Australia)	Kai Calderbank-Park	(Wales) Connah's Quay Nomads	Free	
30 November 2022	FW	(Wales)	Louis Lloyd	(England) Shrewsbury Town	Free	
9 December 2022	MF	(England)	Andy Cannon	(England) Hull City	Undisclosed	
31 January 2023	DF	(Republic of Ireland)	Eoghan O'Connell	(England) Charlton Athletic	Undisclosed	
24 February 2023	MF	(England)	Ryan Barnett	(England) Solihull Moors	Undisclosed	
23 March 2023	GK	(England)	Ben Foster	Unattached	Free	

=== Out ===
Date	Pos.	Nat.	Name	Club	Fee	Ref.
5 July 2022	DF	(England)	Tyler French	(Scotland) Dundee	Undisclosed	
1 September 2022	FW	(England)	Dior Angus	(England) Harrogate Town	Free	

=== Loans out ===
Date	Pos.	Nat.	Name	Club	Duration	Ref.
1 August 2022	FW	(England)	Jake Hyde	(England) Southend United	End of season	
13 January 2023	MF	(England)	Tom Jenkins	(Wales) Gresford Athletic	End of season	

=== Released ===
Date	Pos.	Nat.	Name	Subsequent club	Join date	Ref.
1 July 2022	GK	(Northern Ireland)	Lee Camp	Retired		
1 July 2022	GK	(Poland)	Dawid Szczepaniak	(Wales) Flint Town United	4 August 2022	
1 July 2022	DF	(England)	Cameron Green	(England) Bromley	27 September 2022	
1 July 2022	MF	(England)	Dan Jarvis	(England) Gateshead	1 July 2022	
1 July 2022	MF	(England)	David Jones	Retired		
1 July 2022	MF	(England)	Devonte Redmond	(United Arab Emirates) Gulf United	4 December 2022	
1 July 2022	FW	(England)	Kwame Thomas	(England) Sutton United	1 July 2022	
1 July 2022	FW	(England)	Jordan Ponticelli	(England) King's Lynn Town	14 July 2022	
5 July 2022	DF	(England)	Shaun Brisley	(England) Buxton	7 July 2022	
25 January 2023	GK	(Wales)	Christian Dibble	(England) Kidderminster Harriers	27 January 2023	

=== New contracts ===
Date	Pos.	Nat.	Player	Contract until	Team	Ref.
23 June 2022	MF	(England)	Luke Young	2024	First team	
23 June 2022	DF	(England)	Harry Lennon	2023	First team	
7 July 2022	FW	(England)	Jake Bickerstaff	2024	Reserves	
30 July 2022	MF	(England)	Bryce Hosannah	2024	First team	
5 August 2022	FW	(England)	Paul Mullin	2025	First team	
5 December 2022	MF	(England)	Max Cleworth	2025	First team	
19 January 2023	GK	(Australia)	Kai Calderbank-Park	2023	Reserves	
19 January 2023	GK	(England)	Rory Watson	2023	First team	
23 February 2023	GK	(England)	Rob Lainton	2024	First team	

== Pre-season and friendlies ==
On 22 June 2022, Wrexham announced plans for their pre-season campaign.

16 July 2022 Friendly	Nantwich Town	2–5	Wrexham	Nantwich
15:00 BST	Grant 36'; Cockerline 80'	Report	Hayden 15'; Trialist A 38'; Evans 57'; McAlinden 70'; Mullin 83'	Stadium: Swansway Stadium; Attendance: 1,427; Referee: Ollie Yates

21 July 2022 Friendly	Leganés	2–0	Wrexham	Alicante
10:00 CEST	Muñoz 50' (pen.); Avilés 83'	Report		Stadium: Hotel Golf Campoamor; Attendance: 0 (Behind closed doors)

23 July 2022 Friendly	Wrexham	1–1	Nottingham Forest U21	Alicante
19:00 CEST	Young 69'	Report	79'	Stadium: Hotel Golf Campoamor; Attendance: 0 (Behind closed doors)

30 July 2022 Friendly	Wrexham	4–0	Macclesfield	Wrexham
15:00 BST	Palmer 12'; Jones 32'; Young 50'; O'Connor 62'; Mullin (yellow card) 68'	Report	Clare (yellow card) 15'	Stadium: Racecourse Ground; Attendance: 4,076; Referee: Lee Evans

== Competitions ==
=== Overall record ===
Competition	First match	Last match	Starting round	Final position	Record							
Competition	First match	Last match	Starting round	Final position	Pld	W	D	L	GF	GA	GD	Win %
National League	6 August 2022	29 April 2023	Matchday 1	Winners	46	34	9	3	116	43	+73	73.91
FA Cup	15 October 2022	7 February 2023	Fourth qualifying round	Fourth round proper	7	4	2	1	19	13	+6	57.14
FA Trophy	17 December 2022	13 January 2023	Third round proper	Fourth round proper	2	1	0	1	5	3	+2	50.00
Total					55	39	11	5	140	59	+81	70.91

Last updated: 29 April 2023
Source: Competitions

=== National League ===
==== League table ====
Pos	Team	Pld	W	D	L	GF	GA	GD	Pts	Promotion, qualification or relegation
1	Wrexham (C, P)	46	34	9	3	116	43	+73	111	Promotion to EFL League Two
2	Notts County (O, P)	46	32	11	3	117	42	+75	107	Qualification for the National League play-off semi-finals
3	Chesterfield	46	25	9	12	81	52	+29	84	Qualification for the National League play-off semi-finals
4	Woking	46	24	10	12	71	48	+23	82	Qualification for the National League play-off quarter-finals
5	Barnet	46	21	11	14	75	67	+8	74	Qualification for the National League play-off quarter-finals

Rules for classification: 1) Points; 2) Goal difference; 3) Number of goals scored; 4) Number of matches won; 5) Head-to-head results
(C) Champions; (O) Play-off winners; (P) Promoted

==== Results summary ====
Overall								Home						Away					
Pld	W	D	L	GF	GA	GD	Pts	W	D	L	GF	GA	GD	W	D	L	GF	GA	GD
46	34	9	3	116	43	+73	111	22	1	0	74	19	+55	12	8	3	42	24	+18

Last updated: complete.
Source: National League

==== Results by round ====
Round	1	2	3	4	5	6	7	9	10	11	12	13	14	15	16	17	8^{1}	18	19	20	22	23	25	26	21^{2}	28	29	31	32	30^{5}	33	34	35	24^{3}	36	37	38	39	40	41	42	43	44	27^{4}	45	46
Ground	H	A	A	H	A	H	A	H	A	H	A	A	H	A	H	H	H	A	A	H	A	A	H	A	H	A	A	A	H	H	A	H	H	H	A	A	H	A	H	H	A	H	A	H	H	A
Result	W	D	L	W	W	W	W	W	D	W	W	L	W	D	W	W	W	W	D	W	D	W	W	W	W	W	W	W	W	D	W	W	W	W	D	W	W	W	W	W	L	W	D	W	W	D
Position	6	4	5	5	4	2	2	2	2	2	1	2	2	2	2	2	1	1	2	2	2	2	2	2	2	2	1	2	1	2	2	2	2	1	1	1	1	1	1	1	2	1	1	1	1	1
Points	3	4	4	7	10	13	16	19	22	23	26	26	29	32	33	36	39	42	43	46	47	50	53	56	59	62	65	68	71	72	75	78	81	84	85	88	91	94	97	100	100	103	104	107	110	111

Updated to match(es) played on 22 April 2023. Source: National League
A = Away; H = Home; W = Win; D = Draw; L = Loss; P = Postponed
Notes:
- ^{1} Matchday 8 (vs. Maidenhead United) was postponed, alongside all other matches in the National League, due to the passing of Queen Elizabeth II.
- ^{2} Matchday 21 (vs. Bromley) was postponed to accommodate Wrexham's FA Cup fixture against Farnborough.
- ^{3} Matchday 24 (vs. Chesterfield) was postponed due to issues at the Racecourse Ground regarding frozen conditions following a pitch inspection. It was then postponed again when Chesterfield's FA Cup fixture against West Bromwich Albion was to play a replay.
- ^{4} Matchday 27 (vs. Yeovil Town) was postponed to accommodate Wrexham's FA Cup fixture against Coventry City. It was rescheduled to accommodate Wrexham's FA Cup replay fixture against Sheffield United.
- ^{5} Matchday 30 (vs. Woking) was postponed to accommodate Wrexham's FA Cup fixture against Sheffield United.

==== Matches ====
On 6 July 2022, the National League fixtures were revealed.

6 August 2022 1	Wrexham	2–1	Eastleigh	Wrexham
21:00 BST	Lee 72', 83'; Cleworth (yellow card) 74'	Report	Langston 14', (yellow card) 26'; Hill (yellow card) 65'	Stadium: Racecourse Ground; Attendance: 9,897; Referee: Scott Jackson

13 August 2022 2	Yeovil Town	1–1	Wrexham	Yeovil
15:00 BST	Linton (yellow card) 45+2', (goal) 50'; Worthington (yellow card) 65'; Wakefield (yellow card) 73'; Williams (yellow card) 90+5'	Report	Mullin 6'; Dalby (yellow card) 90'	Stadium: Huish Park; Attendance: 2,885; Referee: Gary Parsons

16 August 2022 2	Chesterfield	2–0	Wrexham	Chesterfield
19:45 BST	King 10', (yellow card) 32'; Banks 23'	Report	McFadzean (yellow card) 31'; Palmer (yellow card) 73'; O'Connor (yellow card) 84'	Stadium: Technique Stadium; Attendance: 8,057; Referee: Steven Copeland

20 August 2022 4	Wrexham	5–0	Maidstone United	Wrexham
15:00 BST	Mullin 9', 62' (pen.), 82'; Davies 39'; Odusanya 45+3' (o.g.); Hayden (yellow card) 67'	Report	Fowler (yellow card) 71'	Stadium: Racecourse Ground; Attendance: 9,863; Referee: David Richardson

27 August 2022 5	Woking	2–3	Wrexham	Woking
17:20 BST	Lofthouse (red card); Daly (yellow card) 37', (goal) 47'; Amond (yellow card) 42'; Grego-Cox (pen.), 86'	Report	Hayden 35', 68'; Palmer (yellow card) 38', (goal) 81'; Jones (yellow card) 42'; Young (yellow card) 85'	Stadium: The Laithwaite Community Stadium; Attendance: 3,185; Referee: Robert Massey-Ellis

30 August 2022 6	Wrexham	3–1	Gateshead	Wrexham
19:45 BST	Tozer 2'; Palmer 9'; Mullin 78'	Report	Storey (yellow card) 16' (yellow-red card) 29'; Bailey 26'; Olley (yellow card) 53'	Stadium: Racecourse Ground; Attendance: 9,805; Referee: Daniel Middleton

3 September 2022 7	Dorking Wanderers	0–5	Wrexham	Dorking
15:00 BST		Report	Palmer 20', 49'; Mendy 24'; Moore 35' (o.g.); Lee 77'	Stadium: Meadowbank Ground; Attendance: 2,730; Referee: Gary Parsons

13 September 2022 9	Wrexham	4–1	Dagenham & Redbridge	Wrexham
19:45 BST	Palmer 25', 75'; Mullin 45+1', 73'; Jones (yellow card) 83'	Report	Grant (yellow card) 38'; Morias 90+6'	Stadium: Racecourse Ground; Attendance: 9,835; Referee: Andrew Miller

17 September 2022 10	Southend United	0–0	Wrexham	Southend-on-Sea
15:00 BST	Mooney (yellow card) 33'	Report	Palmer (yellow card) 66'	Stadium: Roots Hall; Attendance: 6,266; Referee: Aaron Bannister

24 September 2022 11	Wrexham	6–0	Torquay United	Wrexham
15:00 BST	Davies 11'; Mullin 29'; Palmer 42'; Hayden 72'; Dalby 80'; Forde 90'	Report	Jarvis (yellow card) 78'	Stadium: Racecourse Ground; Attendance: 9,970; Referee: Edward Duckworth

1 October 2022 12	Oldham Athletic	1–2	Wrexham	Oldham
15:00 BST	Fondop 26' (yellow card) 49'; Sheron (yellow card) 31'; Clarke (yellow card) 70'; Carragher (yellow card) 90+1'	Report	Tozer 85'; Lee (yellow card) 90+3'; Mullin 90+5' (pen.)	Stadium: Boundary Park; Attendance: 9,496; Referee: Matthew Dicicco

4 October 2022 13	Notts County	1–0	Wrexham	Nottingham
19:45 BST	Langstaff 13', (yellow card) 70'; Slocombe (yellow card) 60'; Brindley (yellow card) 90+4'	Report	Tozer (yellow card) 61'; Lee (yellow card) 84'	Stadium: Meadow Lane; Attendance: 10,741; Referee: Garreth Rhodes

8 October 2022 14	Wrexham	7–5	Barnet	Wrexham
15:00 BST	Hayden 8', 58'; O'Connor 35'; Mullin 37', 53' (pen.) (yellow card) 86'; Young (yellow card) 38' (goal) 55'; Palmer 64' (yellow card) 90+5'	Report	Kabamba 28', 75'; Pritchard 31'; Kanu 51', 84'; Gorman (yellow card) 55'	Stadium: Racecourse Ground; Attendance: 9,987; Referee: Elliot Swallow

22 October 2022 15	Boreham Wood	1–1	Wrexham	Borehamwood
15:00 BST	Newton 30' Stephens (yellow card) 82'	Report	Jones (yellow card) 33'; Hayden 53'	Stadium: Meadow Park; Attendance: 2,536; Referee: Adrian Quelch

25 October 2022 16	Wrexham	3–1	Halifax Town	Wrexham
19:45 BST	Tozer 65'; Davies 83'; Hayden 90'	Report	Dieseruvwe 13' (pen.); Golden (yellow card) 20'	Stadium: Racecourse Ground; Attendance: 10,039; Referee: Michael Barlow

29 October 2022 17	Wrexham	4–0	Altrincham	Wrexham
15:00 BST	Mullin 31'; Palmer 33', 64'; Jones 78'	Report		Stadium: Racecourse Ground; Attendance: 10,107; Referee: Scott Simpson

1 November 2022 8	Wrexham	1–0	Maidenhead United	Wrexham
19:45 GMT	Hayden 30'	Report		Stadium: Racecourse Ground; Attendance: 9,914; Referee: Edward Duckworth
Note: This match, originally was about to be played on 10 September 2022, was included in the league-wide postponement due to the death of Queen Elizabeth II.

9 November 2022 18	Scunthorpe United	1–3	Wrexham	Scunthorpe
19:45 GMT	Lavery (yellow card) 30'; Rowe 42'	Report	Palmer 21'; Hayden 32'; Young (yellow card) 53'; Mullin 70'	Stadium: Glanford Park; Attendance: 3,569; Referee: Gareth Rhodes

12 November 2022 19	Wealdstone	0–0	Wrexham	Ruislip
15:00 GMT	Obiero (yellow card) 35'; Dyer (yellow card) 56'	Report	O'Connor (yellow card) 71'	Stadium: Grosvenor Vale; Attendance: 2,817; Referee: Matthew Corlett

19 November 2022 20	Wrexham	2–0	Aldershot Town	Wrexham
15:00 GMT	Mullin 28'; Jones 38'; McFadzean (yellow card) 90+2'	Report	Amaluzor (yellow card) 18'	Stadium: Racecourse Ground; Attendance: 10,071; Referee: Andrew Miller

3 December 2022 22	York City	1–1	Wrexham	York
12:30 GMT	Mafuta (yellow card) 32'; Hancox (yellow card) 49'; Duku 90+2'	Report	Young (yellow card) 42'; O'Connor 88'	Stadium: York Community Stadium; Attendance: 7,145; Referee: Edward Duckworth

10 December 2022 23	Eastleigh	0–2	Wrexham	Eastleigh
15:00 GMT	Cissé (yellow card) 23'; Hill (yellow card) 31'; Carter (yellow card) 34'; McKiernan (yellow card) 41'; Whitehall (yellow card) 88'	Report	Tozer 18'; Lee 45+2'; Forde (yellow card) 83'	Stadium: Ten Acres; Attendance: 3,986; Referee: Sam Mulhall

26 December 2022 25	Wrexham	5–0	Solihull Moors	Wrexham
15:00 GMT	Palmer 42'; Mullin 51', 78', 80'; Hayden 72'	Report	Storer (red card) 62'	Stadium: Racecourse Ground; Attendance: 10,150; Referee: Garreth Rhodes

2 January 2023 26	Solihull Moors	1–2	Wrexham	Solihull
15:00 GMT	Cybulski 90+1'	Report	Tunnicliffe 11'; O'Connor 65'; Young (yellow card) 81'	Stadium: ARMCO Arena; Attendance: 3,915; Referee: Adrian Quelch

10 January 2023 21	Wrexham	2–1	Bromley	Wrexham
19:30 GMT	Mullin 44' (pen.); Jones 74'; Young (yellow card) 83'; McFadzean (yellow card) 90'	Report	Fisher (yellow card) 4'; Webster (yellow card) 24'; Whitely 33'; Charles-Cook (yellow card) 45'	Stadium: Racecourse Ground; Attendance: 9,807; Referee: Lewis Smith
Note: This match was originally postponed to 21 December 2022 to accommodate Wrexham's FA Cup fixture against Farnborough. It was then postponed again when Wrexham's FA Trophy fixture against Scunthorpe United was postponed to 21 December 2022.

21 January 2023 28	Maidstone United	2–3	Wrexham	Maidstone
15:00 GMT	Binnom-Williams (yellow card) 27'; Lawson (yellow card) 53'; Barham 72', 79'	Report	Young 30'; Mullin 59'; O'Connor (yellow card) 65'; Lee (yellow card) 70'; Hayden 90+1'	Stadium: Gallagher Stadium; Attendance: 3,341; Referee: Aji Ajibola

24 January 2023 29	Gateshead	0–3	Wrexham	Gateshead
19:45 GMT	Pye (yellow card) 38'	Report	O'Connor 61'; Palmer 67'; Mullin 90+2'	Stadium: Gateshead International Stadium; Attendance: 1,422; Referee: Matthew Dicicco

4 February 2023 31	Altrincham	1–2	Wrexham	Altrincham
17:20 GMT	Hulme (yellow card) 23'; Welch-Hayes 81'	Report	O'Connell (yellow card) 23', (goal) 86'; Young (yellow card) 43'; Palmer 61'	Stadium: Moss Lane; Attendance: 4,865; Referee: Paul Marsden

11 February 2023 32	Wrexham	3–1	Wealdstone	Wrexham
15:00 GMT	O'Connell (yellow card) 20'; Mullin 40'; Mendy 53'; Dalby 90'	Report	Obiero (yellow card) 19'; Allarakhia (yellow card) 36' (goal) 50'; Kretzschmar (yellow card) 36' (yellow-red card) 83'; Cook (yellow card) 58'; Andrews (yellow card) 59'	Stadium: Racecourse Ground; Attendance: 10,091; Referee: Elliot Swallow

14 February 2023 30	Wrexham	2–2	Woking	Wrexham
19:45 GMT	Forde 38'; Mullin 56' (pen.)	Report	Amond 7'; Ince (yellow card) 61'; Brown 73' (pen.)	Stadium: Racecourse Ground; Attendance: 10,030; Referee: Steven Copeland
Note: This match originally was to be played on 28 January 2023, however the match was postponed to accommodate Wrexham's FA Cup fixture against Sheffield United.

18 February 2023 33	Aldershot Town	3–4	Wrexham	Aldershot
15:00 GMT	Mnoga (yellow card) 6'; Pendlebury 30'; Hutchinson 39'; Tunnicliffe 89' (o.g.)	Report	Mullin 9' (pen.) 23'; Jordan 35' (o.g.); Dalby 90+6' (yellow card) 90+7'	Stadium: Recreation Ground; Attendance: 4,568; Referee: Sam Mulhall

21 February 2023 34	Wrexham	2–0	Scunthorpe United	Wrexham
19:45 GMT	Mullin 24' (pen.), 82' (pen.); Young (yellow card) 40'	Report	Richards-Everton (yellow card) 26'; Butterfield (yellow card) 64'; Bunker (yellow card) 82'	Stadium: Racecourse Ground; Attendance: 9,915; Referee: Greg Rollason

25 February 2023 35	Wrexham	3–1	Dorking Wanderers	Wrexham
15:00 GMT	Lee 12'; Cannon (yellow card) 35'; Mullin 41'; Dalby 56'	Report	Moore (yellow card) 45+2'; Muitt 76'	Stadium: Racecourse Ground; Attendance: 10,053; Referee: Aaron Bannister

28 February 2023 24	Wrexham	2–1	Chesterfield	Wrexham
19:45 GMT	Lee 4'; Dalby 45+1'	Report	Jones (yellow card) 34'; Grimes (yellow card) 45+3'; McCallum (yellow card) 88'; Colclough 90+5'	Stadium: Racecourse Ground; Attendance: 9,854; Referee: Scott Tallis
Note: This match, originally was about to be played on 13 December 2022, however the match was postponed due to issues at the Racecourse Ground regarding frozen conditions following a pitch inspection. It was then postponed again when Chesterfield's FA Cup fixture against West Bromwich Albion was to play a replay.

4 March 2023 36	Maidenhead United	2–2	Wrexham	Maidenhead
15:00 GMT	Smith 57'; McCoulsky 90'	Report	Mullin 28', 60'	Stadium: York Road; Attendance: 3,534; Referee: Alan Dale

7 March 2023 37	Dagenham & Redbridge	0–4	Wrexham	Dagenham
19:45 GMT	Robinson (yellow card) 25'	Report	Palmer 6', 49'; Tunnicliffe 39'; Mendy 69'	Stadium: Chigwell Construction Stadium; Attendance: 2,772; Referee: Lloyd Wood

11 March 2023 38	Wrexham	1–0	Southend United	Wrexham
15:00 GMT	Arnold 38' (o.g.)	Report	Miley (yellow card) 27'; Kensdale (yellow card) 38'	Stadium: Racecourse Ground; Attendance: 9,770; Referee: Paul Marsden

18 March 2023 39	Bromley	1–2	Wrexham	Bromley
15:00 GMT	Cheek 64'	Report	Mullin 56', 61'; Mendy (yellow card) 90+1'	Stadium: Hayes Lane; Attendance: 5,027; Referee: Matthew Corlett

25 March 2023 40	Wrexham	3–0	York City	Wrexham
15:00 GMT	Whitley 42' (o.g.); Palmer (yellow card) 57'; Dalby 80'; Lee 90+2'	Report	Crookes (yellow card) 31'; Dyson (yellow card) 63'	Stadium: Racecourse Ground; Attendance: 10,161; Referee: Dean Watson

1 April 2023 41	Wrexham	5–1	Oldham Athletic	Wrexham
15:00 BST	O'Connell 24'; Mullin 33', 70', 90+3'; Lee 50'	Report	Hogan 45+3'; Sheron (yellow card) 65'; Fondop (red card) 89'	Stadium: Racecourse Ground; Attendance: 9,910; Referee: James Durkin

7 April 2023 42	Halifax Town	3–1	Wrexham	Halifax
15:00 BST	Alli 47', 70'; Senior (yellow card) 64'; Dieseruvwe 84'; Golden (yellow card) 90+2'	Report	Lee (yellow card) 17' (goal) 32'; O'Connell (yellow card) 52'; Tozer (yellow card) 63'	Stadium: The Shay; Attendance: 7,863; Referee: Ben Atkinson

10 April 2023 43	Wrexham	3–2	Notts County	Wrexham
15:00 BST	O'Connor (yellow card) 32'; Mullin (yellow card) 43' (goal) 48'; Mendy (yellow card) 63' (goal) 69'; Lee (yellow card) 72' (goal) 78'	Report	Rawlinson (yellow card) 40'; Bostock 45+4'; Palmer (yellow card) 66'; Cameron 75'	Stadium: Racecourse Ground; Attendance: 9,924; Referee: Scott Tallis

15 April 2023 44	Barnet	0–0	Wrexham	Canons Park
15:00 BST	Smith (yellow card) 58'; Beard (yellow card) 67'	Report	McFadzean (red card) 52'; Young (yellow card) 90+5'	Stadium: The Hive Stadium; Attendance: 5,265; Referee: Edward Duckworth

18 April 2023 27	Wrexham	3–0	Yeovil Town	Wrexham
TBD BST	Forde 60'; Jones 72'; Mullin 77'	Report	Cooper (yellow card) 43'; Freckleton (yellow card) 44'	Stadium: Racecourse Ground; Attendance: 10,106; Referee: Michael Barlow
Note: This match originally was to be played on 7 January 2023, however the match was postponed to accommodate Wrexham's FA Cup fixture against Coventry City.

22 April 2023 45	Wrexham	3–1	Boreham Wood	Wrexham
15:00 BST	Lee 15'; Mullin 52', 71'	Report	Ndlovu 1'; Ilesanmi (yellow card) 30'	Stadium: Racecourse Ground; Attendance: 10,126; Referee: Scott Jackson
Note: By winning this match, Wrexham secured promotion to the 2023–24 EFL League Two.

29 April 2023 46	Torquay United	1–1	Wrexham	Torquay
15:00 BST	Nouble 53'; Dawson (yellow card) 59'	Report	J. Jones (yellow card) 58'; Lee 80'	Stadium: Plainmoor; Attendance: 4,908; Referee: Gareth Rhodes

=== FA Cup ===
On 3 October 2022, the Fourth qualifying round was drawn. On 17 October 2022, the First Round Proper was drawn. On 7 November 2022, the Second Round Proper was drawn. On 28 November 2022, the Third Round Proper was drawn. On 8 January 2023, the Fourth Round Proper was drawn.

15 October 2022 Fourth qualifying round	Blyth Spartans	1–1	Wrexham	Blyth
15:00 BST	Richardson 88'; Hickey (yellow card) 54'	Report	O'Connor 76'; McFadzean (yellow card); Young (yellow card)	Stadium: Croft Park; Attendance: 2,787; Referee: Paul Marsden

18 October 2022 Fourth qualifying round replay	Wrexham	3–2	Blyth Spartans	Wrexham
19:45 BST	Palmer 9'; Mullin 12'; Davies 36'	Report	O'Donnell 54'; Richardson 57'	Stadium: Racecourse Ground; Attendance: 6,845

6 November 2022 First Round Proper	Wrexham	3–0	Oldham Athletic	Wrexham
12:30 GMT	Dalby 10'; Mullin 25', 62'	Report	Clarke (yellow card) 15'; Cooper (yellow card) 44'	Stadium: Racecourse Ground; Attendance: 9,113; Referee: Sam Barrott

26 November 2022 Second Round Proper	Wrexham	4–1	Farnborough	Wrexham
15:15 GMT	Mullin 49', 82', 90'; Lee (yellow card) 61', (goal) 78'	Report	Pendlebury 62'	Stadium: Racecourse Ground; Attendance: 9,118; Referee: James Oldham

7 January 2023 Third Round Proper	Coventry City	3–4	Wrexham	Coventry
15:00 GMT	Sheaf 36'; Panzo (red card) 57'; Gyökeres 69'; Palmer 76'; Bidwell (yellow card) 83'; Rose (yellow card) 90+8'	Report	Dalby 12' (yellow card) 16'; Lee 18'; O'Connor 45+6'; Mullin (yellow card) 45+8', (goal) 58' (pen.); McAlinden (yellow card) 88'; Young (yellow card) 90+3'	Stadium: Coventry Building Society Arena; Attendance: 18,218; Referee: Tom Nield

29 January 2023 Fourth Round Proper	Wrexham	3–3	Sheffield United	Wrexham
16:30 GMT	Jones 50'; Young (yellow card) 56'; O'Connor 61'; McFadzean (yellow card) 64'; Mullin 86'	Report	McBurnie 2'; Egan (yellow card) 45+7', (goal) 90+5'; Norwood 65'; Jebbison (red card) 71'; Bogle (yellow card) 90+1'	Stadium: Racecourse Ground; Attendance: 9,909; Referee: Dean Whitestone

7 February 2023 Fourth Round Proper Replay	Sheffield United	3–1	Wrexham	Sheffield
19:45 GMT	Coulibaly (yellow card) 45+2'; Ahmedhodžić 50'; Egan (yellow card) 75'; Berge (yellow card) 90+3' (goal) 90+6'; Sharp 90+4'	Report	Mullin 59' (pen.)	Stadium: Bramall Lane; Attendance: 20,310; Referee: Leigh Doughty

=== FA Trophy ===
On 22 November 2022, the Third Round Proper was drawn. On 19 December 2022, the Fourth Round Proper was drawn.

21 December 2022 Third Round Proper	Wrexham	3–1	Scunthorpe United	Wrexham
19:45 GMT	Bickerstaff 33'; Hall-Johnson 70'; Lee 90'	Report	Lavery 8'	Stadium: Racecourse Ground; Attendance: 5,080; Referee: Aaron Jackson
Note: Match originally to be played on 17 December 2022, though was rescheduled to 21 December 2022 due to issues at the Racecourse Ground regarding frozen conditions following a pitch inspection.

13 January 2023 Fourth Round Proper	Altrincham	2–2 (4–3 p)	Wrexham	Altrincham
19:45 GMT	Baines 10'; Pringle (yellow card) 67'; Goodson 88'	Report	Bickerstaff 24', 27'; Lennon (yellow card) 62'	Stadium: Moss Lane; Attendance: 2,526; Referee: Scott Tallis
	Penalties
	Conn-Clarke (penalty scored); Goodson (penalty scored); Lundstram (penalty missed); Jennings (penalty scored); Mullarkey (penalty scored)		(penalty missed) Bickerstaff; (penalty scored) Dalby; (penalty missed) Hall-Johnson; (penalty scored) Jones; (penalty scored) Lennon
Note: This match, originally was about to be played on 14 January 2023, however the match was moved to accommodate the Manchester derby, which is to take place the following day.

== Squad statistics ==
As of match played 29 April 2023

=== Appearances and goals ===
No.	Pos	Nat	Player	Total		National League		FA Cup		FA Trophy	
No.	Pos	Nat	Player	Apps	Goals	Apps	Goals	Apps	Goals	Apps	Goals
1	GK	(England) ENG	Rob Lainton	9	0	6	0	1	0	2	0
2	DF	(England) ENG	Reece Hall-Johnson	5	1	1+1	0	1	0	2	1
3	DF	(Scotland) SCO	Callum McFadzean	36	0	23+8	0	5	0	0	0
4	DF	(England) ENG	Ben Tozer	52	4	45	4	7	0	0	0
5	DF	(England) ENG	Aaron Hayden	31	11	26	11	4+1	0	0	0
6	DF	(England) ENG	Jordan Tunnicliffe	32	2	24+2	2	5	0	1	0
7	MF	(Wales) WAL	Jordan Davies	30	4	12+15	3	3	1	0	0
8	MF	(England) ENG	Luke Young	44	2	34+3	2	7	0	0	0
9	FW	(England) ENG	Ollie Palmer	51	17	37+7	16	2+5	1	0	0
10	FW	(England) ENG	Paul Mullin	53	47	46	38	6+1	9	0	0
11	FW	(Republic of Ireland) IRL	Liam McAlinden	18	0	2+9	0	2+3	0	1+1	0
12	GK	(England) ENG	Ben Foster	9	0	9	0	0	0	0	0
14	MF	(Republic of Ireland) IRL	Anthony Forde	38	3	29+1	3	4+3	0	0+1	0
15	DF	(Republic of Ireland) IRL	Eoghan O'Connell	15	2	15	2	0	0	0	0
17	DF	(England) ENG	Bryce Hosannah	12	0	5+4	0	1+2	0	0	0
18	FW	(England) ENG	Sam Dalby	48	8	9+31	6	5+1	2	2	0
19	DF	(The Gambia) GAM	Jacob Mendy	32	4	23+7	4	1	0	1	0
20	MF	(England) ENG	Andy Cannon	19	0	15+1	0	1	0	2	0
21	GK	(England) ENG	Mark Howard	39	0	32+1	0	6	0	0	0
22	MF	(Republic of Ireland) IRL	Thomas O'Connor	32	7	17+7	4	3+4	3	1	0
24	DF	(Wales) WAL	Scott Butler	1	0	0	0	0	0	1	0
25	DF	(Wales) WAL	Ryan Austin	1	0	0	0	0	0	0+1	0
26	DF	(England) ENG	Harry Lennon	4	0	1	0	1	0	2	0
27	FW	(Wales) WAL	Jake Bickerstaff	3	3	0	0	0+1	0	2	3
29	MF	(England) ENG	Ryan Barnett	12	0	12	0	0	0	0	0
30	MF	(Scotland) SCO	James Jones	52	5	33+10	4	4+3	1	2	0
32	DF	(England) ENG	Max Cleworth	27	0	19+2	0	3+1	0	2	0
34	DF	(England) ENG	Aaron James	1	0	0	0	0	0	0+1	0
37	FW	(Wales) WAL	Kai Evans	1	0	0	0	0+1	0	0	0
38	MF	(England) ENG	Elliot Lee	52	15	34+11	12	5+1	2	0+1	1
41	MF	(England) ENG	David Jones	1	0	0	0	0	0	1	0
Players away on loan:
Players who appeared for Wrexham but left during the season:

=== Goal scorers ===
Place	Position	Nation	Number	Name	National League	FA Cup	FA Trophy	Total
1	FW	(England)	10	Paul Mullin	38	9	0	47
2	FW	(England)	9	Ollie Palmer	16	1	0	17
3	MF	(England)	38	Elliot Lee	12	2	1	15
4	DF	(England)	5	Aaron Hayden	11	0	0	11
5	FW	(England)	18	Sam Dalby	6	2	0	8
6	MF	(Republic of Ireland)	22	Thomas O'Connor	4	3	0	7
7	MF	(Wales)	7	Jordan Davies	3	2	0	5
8	DF	(England)	6	Ben Tozer	4	0	0	4
8	DF	(The Gambia)	19	Jacob Mendy	4	0	0	4
8	MF	(Scotland)	30	James Jones	4	0	0	4
11	FW	(Wales)	27	Jake Bickerstaff	0	0	3	3
11	MF	(Republic of Ireland)	14	Anthony Forde	3	0	0	3
13	MF	(England)	8	Luke Young	2	0	0	2
13	DF	(England)	6	Jordan Tunnicliffe	2	0	0	2
13	DF	(Republic of Ireland)	15	Eoghan O'Connell	2	0	0	2
16	DF	(England)	2	Reece Hall-Johnson	0	0	1	1
Own goal(s)					5	0	0	5
Total					116	19	5	140

=== Clean sheets ===
Place	Position	Nation	Number	Name	National League	FA Cup	FA Trophy	Total
1	GK	(England)	21	Mark Howard	11	1	0	12
2	GK	(England)	12	Ben Foster	4	0	0	4
3	GK	(England)	1	Rob Lainton	3	0	0	3
TOTALS					18	1	0	19

=== Hat-tricks ===
Player	Against	Result	Date	Competition	Ref
(England) Paul Mullin	Maidstone United (H)	5–0	20 August 2022	National League	
(England) Paul Mullin	Farnborough (H)	4–1	26 November 2022	FA Cup	
(England) Paul Mullin	Solihull Moors (H)	5–0	26 December 2022	National League	
(England) Paul Mullin	Oldham Athletic (H)	5–1	1 April 2023	National League	

=== Disciplinary record ===
Number	Nation	Position	Name	National League			FA Cup			FA Trophy			Total		
Number	Nation	Position	Name	Booked	(yellow card) (yellow-red card)	Sent off (straight red)	Booked	(yellow card) (yellow-red card)	Sent off (straight red)	Booked	(yellow card) (yellow-red card)	Sent off (straight red)	Booked	(yellow card) (yellow-red card)	Sent off (straight red)
3	(Scotland)	DF	Callum McFadzean	3	0	1	2	0	0	0	0	0	5	0	1
4	(England)	DF	Ben Tozer	2	0	0	1	0	0	0	0	0	3	0	0
5	(England)	DF	Aaron Hayden	2	0	0	0	0	0	0	0	0	2	0	0
8	(England)	MF	Luke Young	8	0	0	3	0	0	0	0	0	11	0	0
9	(England)	FW	Ollie Palmer	5	0	0	0	0	0	0	0	0	5	0	0
10	(England)	FW	Paul Mullin	2	0	0	1	0	0	0	0	0	3	0	0
11	(Republic of Ireland)	FW	Liam McAlinden	0	0	0	1	0	0	0	0	0	1	0	0
14	(Republic of Ireland)	DF	Anthony Forde	1	0	0	0	0	0	0	0	0	1	0	0
15	(Republic of Ireland)	DF	Eoghan O'Connell	3	0	0	0	0	0	0	0	0	3	0	0
18	(England)	FW	Sam Dalby	2	0	0	1	0	0	0	0	0	3	0	0
19	(The Gambia)	DF	Jacob Mendy	2	0	0	0	0	0	0	0	0	2	0	0
20	(England)	MF	Andy Cannon	1	0	0	0	0	0	0	0	0	1	0	0
22	(Republic of Ireland)	MF	Thomas O'Connor	4	0	0	0	0	0	0	0	0	4	0	0
26	(England)	DF	Harry Lennon	0	0	0	0	0	0	1	0	0	1	0	0
30	(Scotland)	MF	James Jones	4	0	0	0	0	0	0	0	0	4	0	0
32	(England)	MF	Max Cleworth	1	0	0	0	0	0	0	0	0	1	0	0
38	(England)	MF	Elliot Lee	5	0	0	1	0	0	0	0	0	6	0	0
Players away on loan:
Players who left Wrexham during the season:
Total				45	0	1	10	0	0	1	0	0	56	0	1

== Home attendance ==
As of match played 22 April 2023

Competition	Total. att.	Avg. att.
National League	229,392	9,973
FA Cup	34,985	8,746
FA Trophy	5,080	5,080
Total	269,457	9,623

- Sold season tickets: 6,820
