= Thomas Bramall =

English football referee

- Born: 1990 (age 35–36); Sheffield, South Yorkshire, England

Domestic
Years	League	Role
2018–	English Football League	Referee
2022–	Premier League	Referee

Thomas Bramall (born 1990) is an English football referee who primarily officiates in the Premier League, having been promoted to Select Group One in 2022. He is a member of the Sheffield & Hallamshire County Football Association.

== Early life ==
Bramall was born in Sheffield, South Yorkshire in 1990. Prior to becoming a professional referee, he worked as a PE teacher in Rotherham, and as a mathematics teacher at Outwood Academy Valley in Worksop.

== Career ==
In 2022, Bramall left education and became a full-time referee. He was initially promoted to the National List, allowing him to take charge of English Football League matches, ahead of the 2018–19 season. In the summer of 2019, he sustained an anterior cruciate ligament (ACL) injury, which side-lined him from officiating until February 2020.

Ahead of the 2021–22 season, Bramall was promoted to Select Group Two, a group of referees who primarily officiate in the EFL Championship, following his competition debut overseeing a match between Preston North End and Luton Town in March. His first Wembley appearance was on 22 May 2022, when he took charge of the 2022 FA Trophy final, between Wrexham and Bromley. He made his Premier League debut on 30 August 2022 when he refereed Fulham's home fixture against Brighton and Hove Albion.

== Domestic finals ==
2022 FA Trophy Final
Date	Match	Venue
22 May 2022	Wrexham – Bromley	Wembley Stadium
