= Christian Dibble =

Welsh footballer (born 1994)

Personal information
- Date of birth: 11 May 1994 (age 32)
- Place of birth: Wilmslow, England
- Height: 1.93 m (6 ft 4 in)
- Position: Goalkeeper

Team information
- Current team: Macclesfield

Senior career*
Years	Team	Apps	(Gls)
2012–2013	Bury	0	(0)
2013–2016	Barnsley	0	(0)
2014	→ Stockport County (loan)	4	(0)
2014	→ Nuneaton Town (loan)	5	(0)
2015	→ Nuneaton Town (loan)	5	(0)
2015	→ Chelmsford City (loan)	13	(0)
2016	Chelmsford City	15	(0)
2016	Boston United	7	(0)
2016–2017	Nuneaton Town	20	(0)
2017	Chorley	2	(0)
2017–2023	Wrexham	61	(0)
2023–2026	Kidderminster Harriers	125	(0)
2026–	Macclesfield	8	(0)

International career
- Wales U16
- Wales U17
- Wales U19
- Wales U21
- * Club domestic league appearances and goals as of 14:33, 11 September 2026 (UTC)

Christian Dibble (born 11 May 1994) is a Welsh professional footballer who plays as a goalkeeper for Macclesfield.

== Early and personal life ==
Dibble was born in Wilmslow, England. His father is Welsh former footballer Andy Dibble who played for Manchester City. The Dibble family are all Manchester City supporters.

== Club career ==
Dibble has played for Bury, Barnsley, Stockport County, Nuneaton Town, Chelmsford City, Boston United, Chorley and Wrexham.

Throughout his Wrexham career Dibble served as backup to first-choice goalkeeper Rob Lainton, speaking about it in July 2018, January 2019, April 2019, and again in April 2021.

In August 2019 he was said by local media to have "impressed after being handed starting role", and in October 2021 he was praised by Wrexham manager Phil Parkinson after appearing as a substitute after 13 minutes in a match, following a head injury to Lainton.

In April 2022, he spoke about Wrexham's support. In May 2022 he played for Wrexham in the 2022 FA Trophy final having appeared in the competition following further injury to Lainton. He left Wrexham by mutual consent in January 2023.

He signed for Kidderminster Harriers on 27 January 2023. On 26 May 2023, Dibble signed a new one year deal with Kidderminster Harriers. Kidderminster earned promotion via the play-offs with Dibble starting in the play-off final win against Brackley Town. He was released by Kidderminster at the end of the 2025–26 season.

He signed for Macclesfield in May 2026.

== International career ==
Dibble has played for Wales at youth level up to and including under-21.

== Career statistics ==
As of match played 21 September 2024

Appearances and goals by club, season and competition
Club	Season	League			FA Cup		EFL Cup		Other		Total	
Club	Season	Division	Apps	Goals	Apps	Goals	Apps	Goals	Apps	Goals	Apps	Goals
Bury	2012–13	League One	0	0	0	0	0	0	0	0	0	0
Barnsley	2013–14	Championship	0	0	0	0	0	0	—		0	0
Barnsley	2014–15	League One	0	0	0	0	0	0	0	0	0	0
Barnsley	2015–16	League One	0	0	0	0	0	0	0	0	0	0
Barnsley	Total		0	0	0	0	0	0	0	0	0	0
Stockport County (loan)	2013–14	Conference North	4	0	0	0	—		0	0	4	0
Nuneaton Town (loan)	2014–15	Football Conference	5	0	0	0	—		1 (Note: Appearance(s) in FA Trophy)	0	6	0
Nuneaton Town (loan)	2014–15	Football Conference	5	0	0	0	—		0	0	5	0
Chelmsford City (loan)	2015–16	National League North	13	0	0	0	—		0	0	13	0
Chelmsford City	2015–16	National League North	15	0	0	0	—		0	0	15	0
Boston United	2016–17	National League North	7	0	0	0	—		0	0	7	0
Nuneaton Town	2016–17	National League North	20	0	0	0	—		3	0	23	0
Chorley	2016–17	National League North	2	0	0	0	—		0	0	2	0
Wrexham	2017–18	National League	5	0	0	0	—		1	0	6	0
Wrexham	2018–19	National League	2	0	0	0	—		2	0	4	0
Wrexham	2019–20	National League	16	0	0	0	—		2 (Note: One appearance in Scottish Challenge Cup, One appearance in FA Trophy)	0	18	0
Wrexham	2020–21	National League	19	0	0	0	—		1	0	20	0
Wrexham	2021–22	National League	19	0	2	0	—		3	0	24	0
Wrexham	2022–23	National League	0	0	0	0	—		0	0	0	0
Wrexham	Total		61	0	2	0	—		9	0	72	0
Kidderminster Harriers	2022–23	National League North	14	0	0	0	—		0	0	14	0
Kidderminster Harriers	2023–24	National League	46	0	2	0	—		2	0	50	0
Kidderminster Harriers	2024–25	National League North	9	0	0	0	—		0	0	9	0
Kidderminster Harriers	Total		69	0	2	0	—		2	0	73	0
Career total			201	0	4	0	0	0	15	0	220	0

== Honours ==
Wrexham

- FA Trophy runner-up: 2021–22

Kidderminster Harriers

- National League North play-offs: 2023, 2026

Individual

- National League North Team of the Season: 2025–26
