= Kai Calderbank-Park =

Australian footballer (born 2001)

Personal information
- Date of birth: 16 January 2001 (age 25)
- Place of birth: Wollongong, Australia
- Height: 1.89 m (6 ft 2 in)
- Position: Goalkeeper

Team information
- Current team: Chester

Youth career
- –2017: Wollongong
- 2017–2019: Burnley

Senior career*
Years	Team	Apps	(Gls)
2019–2020	Burnley	0	(0)
2019–2020	→ Curzon Ashton (loan)	1	(0)
2020	→ Hyde United (loan)	0	(0)
2020–2021	Bury AFC	3	(0)
2021–2022	Connah's Quay Nomads	3	(0)
2022–2023	Wrexham	0	(0)
2023–2024	Chester	0	(0)
2023	→ Ramsbottom United (dual registration)	4	(0)
2024	→ Litherland REMYCA (dual registration)	3	(0)
2024–	Atherton Collieries	2	(0)

International career^{‡}
2019	Australia U19	2	(0)
2019–	Australia U23	0	(0)
- * Club domestic league appearances and goals as of 10:27, 12 February 2024 (UTC) ‡ National team caps and goals as of 25 April 2023

Kai Calderbank-Park (born 16 January 2001) is an Australian professional footballer who plays as a goalkeeper for National League North club Chester.

== Club career ==
Kai Calderbank-Park joined the Burnley academy in 2017, from Wollongong, after also making a trial at Everton.

Kai Calderbank-Park made his professional debut on loan with sixth-tier side Curzon Ashton, in the National League North. He also enjoyed a one month loan at Hyde United in the Northern Premier League.

Released by Burnley, he joined the newly formed Bury AFC in October 2020, playing in the Division One North of the North West Counties Football League.

After playing one and a half year with Connah's Quay Nomads in the Cymru Premier, he signed a short contract for Wrexham in September 2022. His deal was later extended for a whole season.

On 20 October 2023, Calderbank-Park signed for National League North club Chester.

== International career ==
Kai Calderbank-Park is a youth international for Australia, first receiving a call with the under-19 in 2019 for the AFC U-19 Championship qualifications.

He later was selected with the Australia under-23, being in the squad in the AFC U23 Asian Cup qualifications.

== Career statistics ==
=== Club ===
As of match played 12 February 2024

Appearances and goals by club, season and competition
Club	Season	League			National Cup		League Cup		Other		Total	
Club	Season	Division	Apps	Goals	Apps	Goals	Apps	Goals	Apps	Goals	Apps	Goals
Burnley	2019–20	Premier League	0	0	0	0	0	0	0	0	0	0
Curzon Ashton (loan)	2019–20	National League North	1	0	0	0	–		0	0	1	0
Hyde United (loan)	2019–20	NPL Premier Division	0	0	0	0	1	0	0	0	1	0
Bury AFC (loan)	2020–21	NWCFL Division One North	3	0	0	0	0	0	0	0	3	0
Connah’s Quay Nomads	2020–21	Cymru Premier	0	0	0	0	0	0	0	0	0	0
Connah’s Quay Nomads	2021–22	Cymru Premier	3	0	0	0	1	0	1 (Note: Appearance(s) in the UEFA Europa Conference League)	0	5	0
Connah’s Quay Nomads	Total		3	0	0	0	1	0	1	0	5	0
Wrexham	2022–23	National League	0	0	0	0	–		0	0	0	0
Chester	2023–24	National League North	0	0	0	0	–		0	0	0	0
Ramsbottom United (dual reg)	2023–24	NWCFL Premier Division	4	0	0	0	1	0	1 (Note: Appearance(s) in the FA Vase)	0	6	0
Litherland REMYCA (dual reg)	2023–24	NWCFL Premier Division	3	0	0	0	0	0	0	0	3	0
Atherton Collieries	2023–24	NPL Premier Division	2	0	0	0	0	0	0	0	2	0
Career Total			16	0	0	0	3	0	2	0	21	0

== Honours ==
Connah's Quay Nomads

- Cymru Premier: 2021–22
