= Jordan Davies (footballer) =

Welsh footballer (born 1998)

Personal information
- Full name: Jordan Andrew Davies
- Date of birth: 18 August 1998 (age 28)
- Place of birth: Wrexham, Wales
- Height: 1.78 m (5 ft 10 in)
- Position: Attacking midfielder

Team information
- Current team: Tranmere Rovers
- Number: 15

Youth career
- 2009–2017: Wrexham
- 2017–2020: Brighton & Hove Albion

Senior career*
Years	Team	Apps	(Gls)
2016–2017	Wrexham	0	(0)
2016	→ Bangor City (loan)	14	(1)
2017–2020	Brighton & Hove Albion	0	(0)
2020–2025	Wrexham	129	(28)
2024–2025	→ Grimsby Town (loan)	18	(4)
2025–2026	Fleetwood Town	15	(3)
2026–	Tranmere Rovers	1	(1)

International career^{‡}
2015	Wales U17	1	(0)
2016	Wales U19	2	(0)
- * Club domestic league appearances and goals as of 18:15, 1 August 2026 (UTC) ‡ National team caps and goals as of 13:58, 3 June 2022 (UTC)

Jordan Andrew Davies (/ˈdeɪvɪs/ DAY-vis; born 18 August 1998) is a Welsh professional footballer who plays as an attacking midfielder for EFL League Two club Tranmere Rovers.

Born in Wrexham, Davies joined the local team's academy. He joined Cymru Premier side Bangor on a short-term loan the day after his 18th birthday. Following a spell with the youth academy of Brighton, he re-signed for Wrexham in 2020. Davies has represented Wales U17 in a one-off appearance in 2015 and Wales U19 in a duel against the Czech Republic U19 in 2016.

== Club career ==
=== Wrexham ===
Following impressive displays within the Wrexham academy, Davies joined Cymru Premier side Bangor on a short-term loan the day after his 18th birthday. Davies made 14 appearances in four months at Bangor with his performances leading to comparisons with Gareth Bale by former Wales international Andy Legg. Following the conclusion of the loan, Bangor made an offer to sign Davies on a permanent basis. However, this offer was rejected by Wrexham.

=== Brighton & Hove Albion ===
Championship leaders Brighton & Hove Albion signed him to a two-and-a-half-year contract for an undisclosed fee shortly after his return to Wrexham. Davies was selected and scored his first professional goal in the EFL Trophy victory over Peterborough United in October 2018. On 10 June 2020, Davies was released by the club.

=== Return to Wrexham ===
Following his release by Brighton at the conclusion of the 2019–20 Premier League season, Davies re-signed with Wrexham on a two-year contract. In his first season back at the Racecourse, Davies played a central role as Wrexham narrowly missed out on the National League play-offs the final day of the season. This season included Davies scoring the first hattrick of his professional career in the April win over Halifax Town.

On 1 January 2022, Davies signed a three-and-a-half-year extension with Wrexham.

==== Grimsby Town (loan) ====
In August 2024, Davies joined EFL League Two team Grimsby Town on loan until the end of the season. He had been assigned squad number 7 for the 2024–25 season He made his first appearance for the club off the bench in Grimsby's first league match away to Fleetwood Town. Davies scored his first two goals for the club in the 3–2 league victory over Cheltenham Town on 17 August 2024, but suffered a season-ending injury in January. Davies departed Wrexham upon the expiration of his contract at the end of the 2024–25 season.

=== Fleetwood Town ===
On 27 August 2025, he signed for EFL League Two club Fleetwood Town F.C. on a 1 year deal. He got off to a flying start with three goals and an assist in his first 5 appearances for the club.

=== Tranmere Rovers ===
On 21 July 2026, he signed for EFL League Two club Tranmere Rovers F.C. on a 1 year deal. He scored on his Tranmere Rovers debut on 1 August 2026 during the 2–2 draw which saw a penalty shoot-out loss against Rochdale in the EFL Cup first round.

== Career statistics ==
As of match played 1 August 2026

Appearances and goals by club, season and competition
Club	Season	League			National cup (Note: Includes FA Cup)		League cup (Note: Includes Welsh League Cup, EFL Cup)		Other		Total	
Club	Season	Division	Apps	Goals	Apps	Goals	Apps	Goals	Apps	Goals	Apps	Goals
Wrexham	2016–17	National League	0	0	0	0	—		0	0	0	0
Bangor City (loan)	2016–17	Welsh Premier League	14	1	0	0	1	0	—		15	1
Brighton & Hove Albion	2016–17	Championship	0	0	0	0	—		—		0	0
Brighton & Hove Albion	2017–18	Premier League	0	0	0	0	0	0	—		0	0
Brighton & Hove Albion	2018–19	Premier League	0	0	0	0	0	0	—		0	0
Brighton & Hove Albion	2019–20	Premier League	0	0	0	0	0	0	—		0	0
Brighton & Hove Albion	Total		0	0	0	0	0	0	0	0	0	0
Brighton & Hove Albion U21	2018–19	—			—		—		3 (Note: Appearances in EFL Trophy)	1	3	1
Brighton & Hove Albion U21	2019–20	—			—		—		3	0	3	0
Brighton & Hove Albion U21	Total		0	0	0	0	0	0	6	1	6	1
Wrexham	2020–21	National League	38	8	1	0	—		1 (Note: Appearance in FA Trophy)	0	40	8
Wrexham	2021–22	National League	39	15	3	1	—		6 (Note: Five appearances and four goals in FA Trophy, one appearance and one goal in National League play-offs)	5	48	21
Wrexham	2022–23	National League	27	3	3	1	—		0	0	30	4
Wrexham	2023–24	League Two	25	2	3	0	1	0	3	2	32	4
Wrexham	2024–25	League One	0	0	0	0	0	0	—		0	0
Wrexham	Total		129	28	10	2	1	0	10	7	150	37
Grimsby Town (loan)	2024–25	League Two	18	4	0	0	1	0	1	0	20	4
Fleetwood Town	2025–26	League Two	15	3	1	0	—		2	1	18	4
Tranmere Rovers	2026–27	League Two	0	0	0	0	1	1	0	0	1	1
Career total			176	36	11	2	4	1	19	9	210	48

== Honours ==
Brighton & Hove Albion

- PL2 Division Two play-off: 2017–18

Wrexham

- EFL League Two runner-up: 2023–24
- National League: 2022–23
- FA Trophy runner-up: 2021–22

Individual

- Wrexham Young Player of the Season: 2020–21
- Wrexham Goal of the Season: 2020–21
- Wrexham Players' Player of the Season: 2021–22
- National League Team of the Season: 2021–22
