= Bryce Hosannah =

English footballer

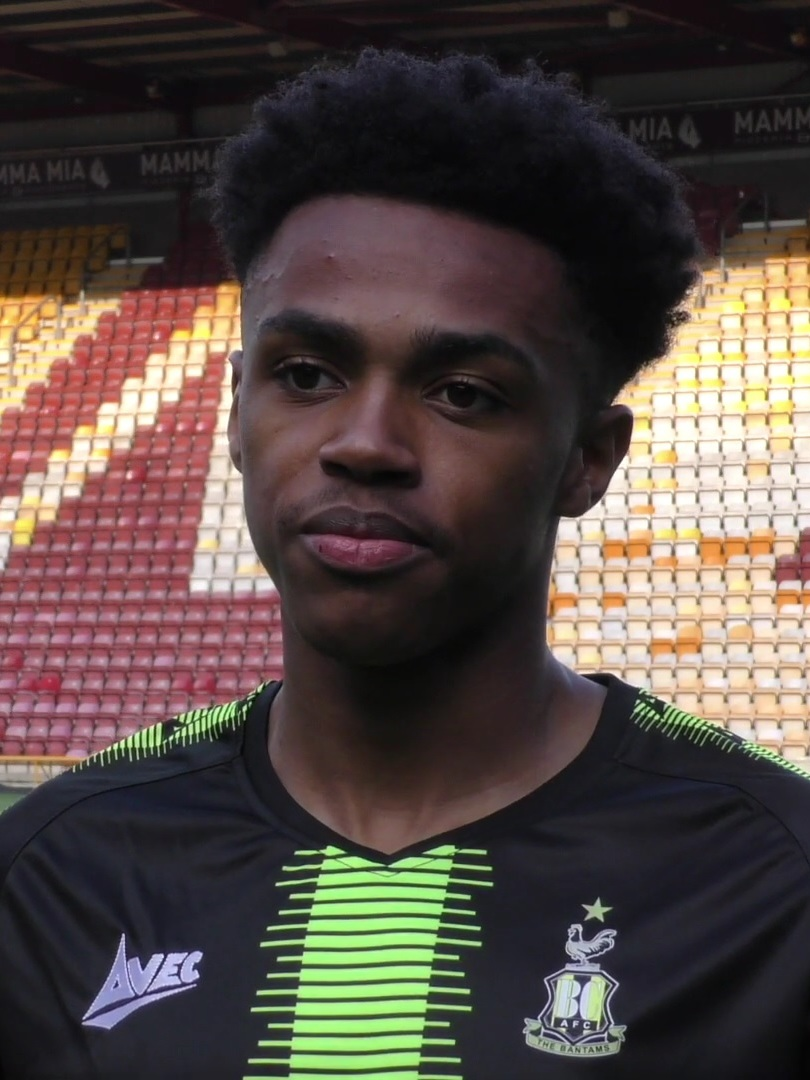
- Hosannah with Bradford City in 2020

Personal information
- Full name: Bryce Joseph Hosannah
- Date of birth: 8 April 1999 (age 27)
- Place of birth: Lambeth, England
- Height: 5 ft 9 in (1.75 m)
- Position: Defender

Youth career
- –2017: Crystal Palace
- 2017–2020: Leeds United

Senior career*
Years	Team	Apps	(Gls)
2020–2021	Leeds United	0	(0)
2020–2021	→ Bradford City (loan)	8	(0)
2021–2024	Wrexham	34	(1)
2024–2025	AFC Fylde	21	(0)
2025–2026	Rochdale	5	(0)
- * Club domestic league appearances and goals as of 15 October 2026

Bryce Joseph Hosannah (born 8 April 1999) is an English professional footballer who plays as a defender.

== Early and personal life ==
Born in Lambeth, Hosannah grew up in Brixton; his father was a former professional basketball player and his mother worked as a retail executive. He achieved five A* and four A grades at GCSE level. He began his football career at the age of 8 with the Afewee Urban academy.

== Career ==
=== Leeds United ===
Having played for Crystal Palace's academy before being released in 2017, Hosannah signed for Leeds United in the summer of 2017, initially joining up with the club's under-23 squad. He signed a new two-year deal for Leeds in May 2018. In August 2019, Hosannah underwent surgery before finding his way into onto the Leeds bench for the first time as an unused substitute in a 2–0 victory against Huddersfield Town on 7 December 2019.

On 29 September 2020, Hosannah joined Bradford City on loan until the end of the 2020–21 season. In November 2020 he was one of a number of young Bradford City players playing in the first team who were praised by manager Stuart McCall. He returned to Leeds in April 2021 for rehab, following surgery to an injury sustained in December 2020. He made 11 appearances in all competitions during his loan at the club.

=== Wrexham ===
On 31 August 2021, Hosannah joined National League side Wrexham on a free transfer, signing a two-year deal. He was set to debut for the club on 2 October 2021 as a right wing-back against Aldershot Town, but the match was abandoned early into the second half with Wrexham winning 2–0. As such he made his debut three days later in a 1–1 draw at home to Chesterfield. He was sent off in his fifth appearance for the club (and the first game to be attended by the club's new owners Ryan Reynolds and Rob McElhenney) after being adjudged to have elbowed an opposition player as the club lost 3–2 to Maidenhead United. However, Hosannah served no punishment for his red card as the Football Association reviewed the incident and decided that Paul Mullin was responsible for the elbow and subsequently issued Mullin with a three-match ban. He was released by the club on 1 February 2024.

=== AFC Fylde ===
Following his release from Wrexham, Hosannah signed for National League club AFC Fylde on 6 February 2024 on a short-term contract until the end of the season.

=== Rochdale ===
On 30 May 2025, Hosannah signed for Rochdale on a one-year contract. On 18 May 2026, the club announced it was releasing him.

== Career statistics ==
As of match played 5 May 2025

Appearances and goals by club, season and competition
Club	Season	League			FA Cup		EFL Cup		Other		Total	
Club	Season	Division	Apps	Goals	Apps	Goals	Apps	Goals	Apps	Goals	Apps	Goals
Leeds United	2020–21	Premier League	0	0	0	0	0	0	—		0	0
Bradford City (loan)	2020–21	League Two	8	0	2	0	0	0	1 (Note: Appearance(s) in EFL Trophy)	0	11	0
Wrexham	2021–22	National League	24	1	1	0	—		1 (Note: Appearance(s) in FA Trophy)	1	26	2
Wrexham	2022–23	National League	8	0	1	0	—		0	0	9	0
Wrexham	2023–24	League Two	1	0	0	0	0	0	2	0	3	0
Wrexham	Total		33	1	2	0	0	0	3	1	38	2
AFC Fylde	2023–24	National League	10	0	0	0	—		0	0	10	0
AFC Fylde	2024–25	National League	25	0	0	0	—		0	0	25	0
AFC Fylde	Total		35	0	0	0	—		0	0	35	0
Rochdale	2025–26	National League	5	0	0	0	—		0	0	5	0
Career total			81	1	4	0	0	0	4	1	89	2

== Honours ==
Wrexham

- National League: 2022–23

Rochdale AFC

- National League Play Offs: 2025-26
