= Liam McAlinden =

Irish footballer (born 1993)

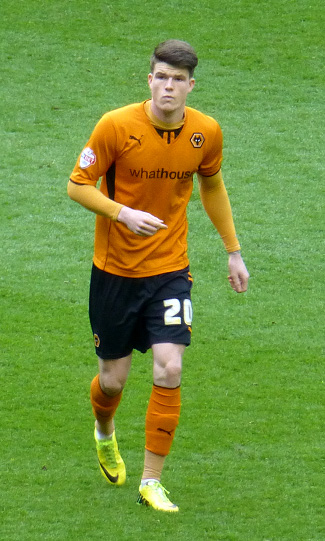
- McAlinden playing for Wolverhampton Wanderers in 2014

Personal information
- Full name: Liam James McAlinden
- Date of birth: 26 September 1993 (age 33)
- Place of birth: Cannock, England
- Height: 6 ft 1 in (1.85 m)
- Position: Striker

Team information
- Current team: Rushall Olympic

Youth career
- 2001–2010: Wolverhampton Wanderers

Senior career*
Years	Team	Apps	(Gls)
2010–2016	Wolverhampton Wanderers	14	(1)
2013	→ Shrewsbury Town (loan)	9	(3)
2014	→ Fleetwood Town (loan)	5	(2)
2015	→ Fleetwood Town (loan)	14	(2)
2015	→ Shrewsbury Town (loan)	8	(0)
2016	→ Crawley Town (loan)	6	(1)
2016–2018	Exeter City	61	(7)
2018–2019	Cheltenham Town	6	(0)
2018–2019	→ Brackley Town (loan)	5	(1)
2019	→ Kidderminster Harriers (loan)	15	(0)
2019–2020	FC Halifax Town	27	(10)
2020	Stockport County	9	(2)
2020–2021	Morecambe	28	(2)
2021–2024	Wrexham	46	(1)
2024	Scunthorpe United	11	(2)
2024–	Rushall Olympic	38	(1)

International career
2012	Northern Ireland U21	3	(0)
2014	Republic of Ireland U21	1	(0)
- * Club domestic league appearances and goals as of 26 April 2025 (UTC)

Liam James McAlinden (born 26 September 1993) is a professional footballer who plays as a forward for Northern Premier League Premier Division club Rushall Olympic.

McAlinden is a youth exponent of Wolverhampton Wanderers and has played for Exeter City, Cheltenham Town, Halifax Town, Stockport County, Morecambe and Wrexham, as well as a host of other clubs on loan. Born in England, McAlinden has represented both Northern Ireland and the Republic of Ireland at youth levels.

== Club career ==
=== Wolverhampton Wanderers ===
McAlinden joined Wolverhampton Wanderers as an 8-year-old. At 17-years-old, in 2010, McAlinden signed his first professional contract with Wolves. He made his senior debut on 27 April 2013 as a substitute in a 1–2 defeat to Burnley. He scored his first senior goal on 3 September 2013 in an EFL Trophy tie against Walsall.

In October 2013, McAlinden joined fellow EFL League One club, Shrewsbury Town, on a three month loan deal. He scored on his club debut after coming on as a substitute against Gillingham, the first of three goals in nine appearances before being recalled by Wolves in early December.

McAlinden scored his first league goal for Wolves, to earn them a 1–0 victory at MK Dons in March 2014. He would play seven times in League One for Wolves, as they finished first, winning the league and earning promotion to the EFL Championship. McAlinden signed a new two-year deal with Wolves following their promotion.

In October 2014, McAlinden moved on a three-month-loan deal to League One club, Fleetwood Town. However, after scoring twice in his first 5 appearances for Fleetwood, he was recalled to cover injuries at his parent club. On 15 January 2015, McAlinden returned on loan to Fleetwood for the remainder of the season, where he scored two further goals during 14 appearances.

McAlinden returned to Shrewsbury Town for a second time on a half-season loan in July 2015. In March 2016, he signed a loan deal with Crawley Town until the end of the 2015–16 season. He scored his first and only goal for Crawley in a 2–2 draw against York City.

Upon the expiration of his contract, McAlinden was released by Wolves at the end of the 2015–16 season, after he wasn't offered a renewal.

=== Exeter City ===
On 31 May 2016, McAlinden signed for League Two club Exeter City. He made his debut for Exeter on the 6 August 2016, in a 2–0 loss to Blackpool. A week later, he scored his first goal for Exeter in a 2–1 defeat to Hartlepool United. Over his two year stint at the club, McAlinden scored 7 goals in 61 appearances, including one against Grimsby Town, which would later be voted the Goal of the Month by Exeter fans. He was released by Exeter at the end of the 2017–18 season.

=== Cheltenham Town ===
Follow his release from Exeter, McAlinden joined Chesterfield Town as a trailist, scoring in a 4–0 victory against Gainsborough Trinity in a pre-season friendly. Ultimately, McAlinden signed a two-year deal with League Two side Cheltenham Town on 28 July 2018. He made his debut for Cheltenham on 4 August 2018, in a 1–0 loss to Crawley Town. With game time limited, on 15 December 2018, McAllinden joined Brackley Town on an initial one month loan. On 22 December 2018, he made his debut in a 2–1 loss to York City. On 29 December 2018, he scored his first goal for Brackley in a 3–1 win against Nuneaton Borough. Following his loan deal, he returned to Cheltenham, but two days later he joined Kidderminster Harriers on loan for one month. The club announced on 21 February 2019, that the loan deal had been extended until the end of the season. At the end of the 2018–19 season, Cheltenham announced they had transfer listed McAlinden. His contract with Cheltenham was cancelled in June 2019.

=== FC Halifax Town ===
On 6 August 2019, McAlinden joined National League side, FC Halifax Town. He made his debut on the same day, as an 83rd minute substitute in a 2–0 win against Hartlepool United. He made his first league start and scored in a 1–0 win against Dagenham & Redbridge. On 31 August 2019, McAlinden scored both goals in a 2–1 victory over Solihull Moors. McAlinden left partway through the season, however his contribution helped Halifax finish 6th and in the play-offs. In his time at Halifax, McAlinden scored 10 times in 27 appearances.

=== Stockport County ===
Despite interest from football league clubs, on 14 January 2020, he signed for fellow National League side, Stockport County. On 18 January 2020, McAlinden made his debut for Stockport in a 0–0 draw against Sutton United. On 8 February 2020, he scored his first goal for Stockport in 1–1 draw against Dagenham & Redbridge. Stockport's season was cut short due to the COVID-19 pandemic and McAlinden was released upon the expiry of his contract.

=== Morecambe ===
On 4 August 2020, McAlinden signed for League Two club Morecambe. On 12 September 2020, McAlinden made his debut in a 2–1 win against former club Cheltenham. In the reverse fixture against Cheltenham, McAlinden scored his first goal for Morecambe as they won 1–0. He featured in a 4–0 loss to Chelsea in the FA Cup and a 7–0 loss to Newcastle United in the EFL Cup. In the league, Morecambe finished fourth and qualified for the play-offs. In the play-off semi-finals, Morecambe were placed against 7th place Tranmere Rovers. In the first-leg, McAlinden scored the second goal, as Morecambe won 2–1. In the second leg, McAlinden provided the assist for Aaron Wildig's 9th minute strike. Morecambe drew the second-leg 1–1, but won the tie 3–2 on aggregate. McAlinden also featured in the play-off final against Newport County, but was substituted in the 75th minute. Morecambe won 1–0 after extra time and were promoted League One. He was released at the end of the season.

=== Wrexham ===
On 9 July 2021, McAlinden signed for National League side Wrexham on a two-year deal. Upon his arrival, manager Phil Parkinson revealed that Wrexham had to fight off league clubs to bring in McAlinden. On 21 August 2021, he made his debut as a 70th minute substitute in a 2–2 draw against Solihull Moors. McAlinden scored his first and only league goal for Wrexham in a 6–0 victory over Barnet. Wrexham finished in second place, qualifying for the play-off semi-finals, where they faced sixth placed Grimsby Town. McAlinden featured off the bench as Wrexham lost 5–4 after extra time and were knocked out the play-offs. McAlinden also started in the FA Trophy final against Bromley, though Wrexham lost 1–0.

In the 2022–23 season, McAlinden featured less in the league, though played in 5 of the 7 FA Cup games, which saw Wrexham reach the fourth round and take Championship side, Sheffield United, to a replay. In the league, Wrexham pipped Notts County to the title, which meant Wrexham were promoted to League Two. With promotion to League Two confirmed, McAlinden was offered a one-year contract extension, which he agreed to.

In the 2023–24 season, McAlinden struggled even more for game time in League Two and agreed to a mutual termination of his contract on 1 February 2024. McAlinden played 46 times in the league and scored once.

=== Scunthorpe United ===
On 15 February 2024, McAlinden signed for National League North side Scunthorpe United on a short-term contract until the end of the season. On the 17 February 2024, he made his debut in a 0–0 draw against Scarborough Athletic. On 2 March 2024, McAlinden scored his first goal in a 2–2 draw against Chester. However, in the same game, he mistimed his tackle Harrison Burke, arriving late and high, with studs showing, resulting in the referee showing him a red card. Scunthorpe United finished second in the league, qualifying for the play-off semi-finals, where they faced sixth placed Boston United. McAlinden came on off the bench during the 0–0 draw, which saw the tie go to penalties. He took the sixth penalty for Scunthorpe, but his effort was saved by Boston 'keeper Cameron Gregory. The missed penalty saw Scunthorpe knocked out of the play-offs. Scunthorpe did not renew McAlinden's contract upon its expiry.

=== Rushall Olympic ===
On 9 August 2024, McAlinden signed for National League North side Rushall Olympic.

== International career ==
Although born in England, McAlinden can represent Northern Ireland - through his grandfather - and the Republic of Ireland - through his parents. He represented Northern Ireland at Under-19 and Under-21 levels. However, in June 2013, he switched his allegiance to the Republic of Ireland, whom he has also represented at Under-21 level.

== Career statistics ==
As of match played 27 April 2024

Appearances and goals by club, season and competition
Club	Season	League			FA Cup		League Cup		Other		Total	
Club	Season	Division	Apps	Goals	Apps	Goals	Apps	Goals	Apps	Goals	Apps	Goals
Wolverhampton Wanderers	2012–13	Championship	1	0	0	0	0	0	—		1	0
Wolverhampton Wanderers	2013–14	League One	7	1	0	0	1	0	2 (Note: Appearances in Football League Trophy)	1	10	2
Wolverhampton Wanderers	2014–15	Championship	6	0	1	0	1	0	—		8	0
Wolverhampton Wanderers	2015–16	Championship	0	0	0	0	0	0	—		0	0
Wolverhampton Wanderers	Total		14	1	1	0	2	0	2	1	19	2
Shrewsbury Town (loan)	2013–14	League One	9	3	—		—		—		9	3
Fleetwood Town (loan)	2014–15	League One	19	4	—		—		—		19	4
Shrewsbury Town (loan)	2015–16	League One	8	0	1	0	0	0	2	1	11	1
Crawley Town (loan)	2015–16	League Two	6	1	—		—		—		6	1
Exeter City	2016–17	League Two	32	5	0	0	2	0	3 (Note: Appearances in EFL Trophy)	2	37	7
Exeter City	2017–18	League Two	29	2	4	1	1	0	2	1	36	4
Exeter City	Total		61	7	4	1	3	0	5	3	73	11
Cheltenham Town	2018–19	League Two	6	0	0	0	1	0	1	0	8	0
Brackley Town (loan)	2018–19	National League North	5	1	—		—		1 (Note: Appearance(s) in FA Trophy)	0	6	1
Kidderminster Harriers (loan)	2018–19	National League North	15	0	—		—		—		15	0
FC Halifax Town	2019–20	National League	27	10	1	0	—		0	0	28	10
Stockport County	2019–20	National League	9	2	—		—		0	0	9	2
Morecambe	2020–21	League Two	28	2	1	0	3	0	5 (Note: Two appearances in EFL Trophy, three appearances and one goal in EFL League Two play-offs)	1	37	3
Wrexham	2021–22	National League	32	1	3	0	—		2	0	37	1
Wrexham	2022–23	National League	11	0	5	0	—		0	0	16	0
Wrexham	2023–24	League Two	2	0	0	0	0	0	4	0	6	0
Wrexham	Total		45	1	8	0	0	0	6	0	59	1
Scunthorpe United	2023–24	National League North	10	2	—		—		1 (Note: Appearance in National League North play-offs)	0	11	2
Career total			229	33	11	1	9	0	18	6	267	40

== Honours ==
Wolverhampton Wanderers

- Football League One: 2013–14

Morecambe

- EFL League Two play-offs: 2021

Wrexham

- National League: 2022–23
- FA Trophy runner-up: 2021–22
