= Ollie Palmer =

English footballer (born 1992)

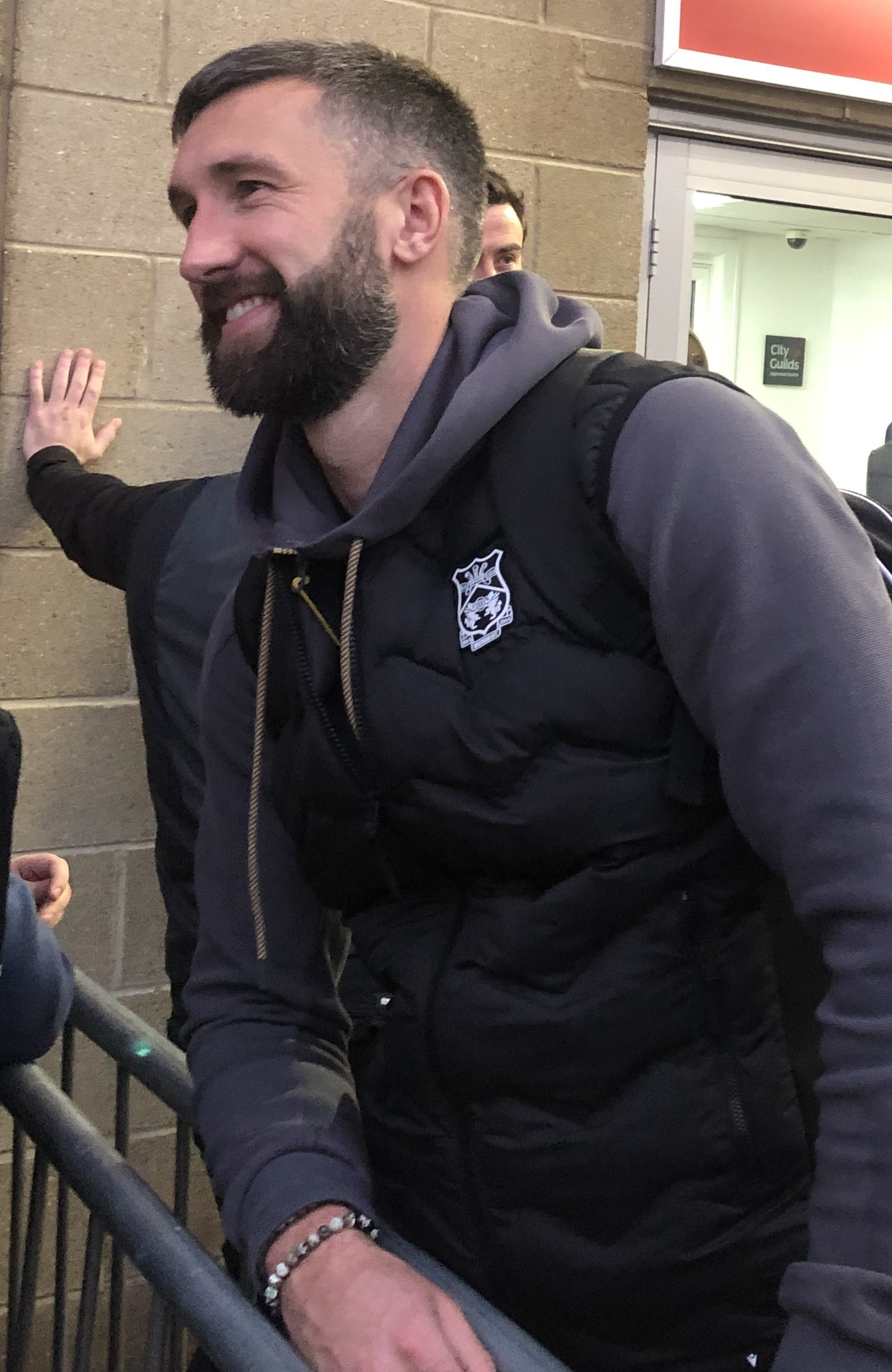
- Ollie Palmer in 2024.

Personal information
- Full name: Oliver James Palmer
- Date of birth: 21 January 1992 (age 34)
- Place of birth: Epsom, England
- Height: 6 ft 5 in (1.96 m)
- Position: Striker

Team information
- Current team: Swindon
- Number: 28

Youth career
- –2011: Woking

Senior career*
Years	Team	Apps	(Gls)
2010–2011	Woking	19	(2)
2010	→ St Albans City (loan)	3	(0)
2011	→ Boreham Wood (loan)	7	(1)
2011–2013	Havant & Waterlooville	69	(37)
2013–2015	Mansfield Town	54	(5)
2015	→ Grimsby Town (loan)	13	(6)
2015–2017	Leyton Orient	65	(12)
2017	→ Luton Town (loan)	17	(3)
2017–2018	Lincoln City	45	(8)
2018–2020	Crawley Town	68	(27)
2020–2022	AFC Wimbledon	41	(10)
2022–2025	Wrexham	132	(42)
2025–	Swindon Town	42	(8)
- * Club domestic league appearances and goals as of 00:20, 17 August 2026 (UTC)

Oliver James Palmer (born 21 January 1992) is an English professional footballer who plays as a striker for EFL League Two club Swindon Town.

== Early life and education ==
Born in Epsom, Surrey, Palmer supported Wimbledon as a child, for whom his grandfather Tony Wright played in the 1950s. He stopped supporting the club following their relocation to Milton Keynes, stating "My team was Wimbledon as a kid – but I wasn't going to support Milton Keynes Dons". He attended Therfield School from 2003 to 2008.

His father Andy served as a Metropolitan Police protection officer for the Royal Family, and was the Prince of Wales' Personal Protection Officer for 10 years.

== Football career ==
=== Woking ===
Palmer began his career at the college scheme of Woking, although by his own admission, he never attended the actual college, working as a part-time roofer instead. Palmer was selected for the England Colleges National Team in 2010, and later signed a first-team contract in August of that year. Palmer was subsequently loaned out to fellow Conference South club St Albans City in November 2010 and scored one goal from five appearances. He finished 2010–11 with two goals from 20 appearances for Woking and signed a new one-year contract with the club after the end of the season.

=== Havant & Waterlooville ===
After he was recalled from a loan spell at Boreham Wood, Palmer signed for fellow Conference South club Havant & Waterlooville permanently in September 2011. After seven goals from five appearances, League One club Charlton Athletic were reportedly interested in signing him. Palmer finished 2012–13 as Conference South joint top scorer with 25 goals from 42 appearances and was also named Player of the Year.

=== Mansfield Town ===
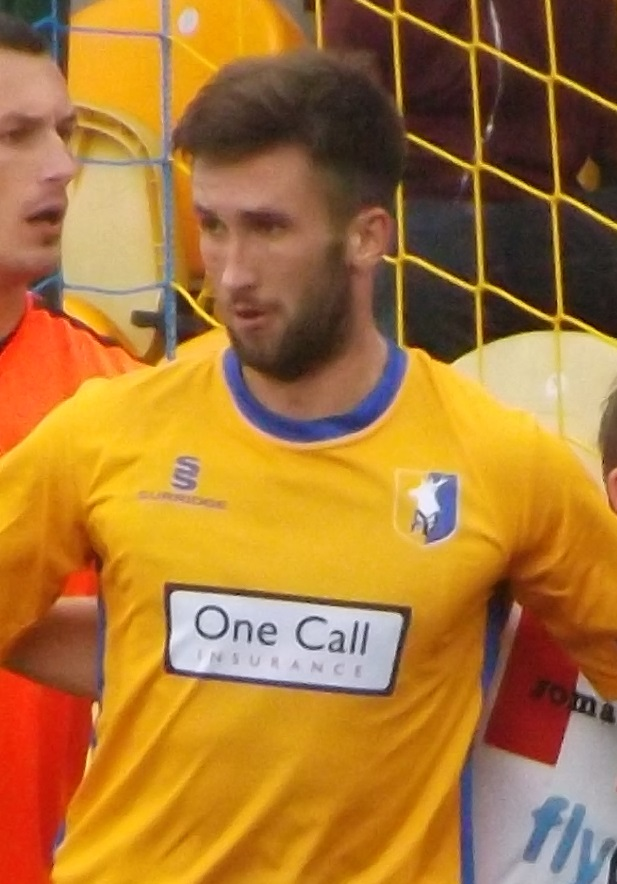
Palmer playing for Mansfield Town in 2013.

Palmer signed for newly promoted League Two club Mansfield Town on 2 August 2013 on a two-year contract for an undisclosed fee. He debuted a day later as a 61st-minute substitute in a 2–0 defeat away to Scunthorpe United and scored his first goal in a 1–0 win away to Wycombe Wanderers on 17 August.

==== Grimsby Town (loan) ====
On 5 January 2015, Palmer joined Conference Premier club Grimsby Town on an initial one-month loan. He scored on his debut at home to league-leaders Barnet on 17 January, scoring Grimsby's first goal in a 3–1 victory. Palmer's loan at Grimsby was extended on 30 January until the end of the season. He missed a month due to a hamstring injury, scoring on his return with the opener away to former club Woking on 7 March, which finished as a 2–1 victory. Palmer scored a brace in the play-off semi-final second leg against Eastleigh, the first coming in the 35th minute and the second coming in the 71st minute, which made the score 3–0, meaning Grimsby won the tie 5–1 on aggregate. He started in the 2015 Conference Premier play-off final at Wembley Stadium on 17 May 2015, which finished as a 1–1 draw after extra time, but Grimsby lost the subsequent penalty shoot-out 5–3 to Bristol Rovers.

=== Leyton Orient ===
On 6 July 2015, Palmer signed for League Two club Leyton Orient for an undisclosed fee on a two-year contract. He debuted on the opening day of 2015–16 in a 2–0 win at home to Barnet, having entered the match as an 89th-minute substitute and scored his first goal after being introduced as a 76th-minute substitute in a 3–0 win at home to Stevenage on 18 August.

==== Luton Town (loan) ====
On 31 January 2017, Palmer joined League Two club Luton Town on loan until the end of 2016–17. He debuted four days later in a 1–1 draw away to former loan club Grimsby Town, having entered the match as a 58th-minute substitute. After coming on as a substitute in the 73rd minute, Palmer scored his first goal for Luton with the third goal in a 3–0 victory at home to Hartlepool United on 14 February. Having entered Luton's 3–2 defeat away to Blackpool in the first leg of the play-off semi-final on 14 May as an 86th-minute substitute, Palmer was an unused substitute in the second leg four days later, which resulted in a 3–3 draw and a 6–5 defeat on aggregate. He completed the loan spell with 18 appearances and three goals.

=== Lincoln City ===
On 26 June 2017, Palmer signed a two-year contract with newly promoted League Two club Lincoln City. He scored his first goal for Lincoln in an EFL Trophy tie against Mansfield Town on 29 August. Palmer came on as a 63rd-minute substitute as Lincoln beat Shrewsbury Town 1–0 at Wembley Stadium in the 2018 EFL Trophy Final on 8 April 2018, having been named in the Team of the Tournament prior to the match.

=== Crawley Town ===
Palmer signed for fellow League Two club Crawley Town on 27 June 2018 on a two-year contract for a nominal fee. In February 2019, Palmer apologised after he and teammate Dominic Poleon posted a video online mocking Crawley's training facilities and teammates. He left the club in the summer of 2020 following the expiry of his contract.

=== AFC Wimbledon ===
Palmer joined League One club AFC Wimbledon on 7 August 2020. He signed a two-year contract, with a third year automatically triggered if a certain number of appearances were met. He scored his first goal for Wimbledon in a 2–1 defeat to Lincoln City on 2 January 2021.

=== Wrexham ===
Palmer signed for Wrexham, then a National League club, on 24 January 2022 on a three-and-a-half-year contract for a club record fee of £300,000. In his first three full seasons with the club, they were promoted back-to-back-to-back from the National League to the Championship.

In October 2024, Palmer signed a contract extension until the end of the 2025–26 season. On 29 August 2025, Palmer left Wrexham by mutual consent.

=== Swindon Town ===
On the same day that he left Wrexham, Palmer joined League Two side Swindon Town on a two-year contract.

== Filmography ==
Year	Title	Role	Notes	Refs.
2024	Deadpool & Wolverine	Bar patron	Cameo appearance	

== Career statistics ==
As of match played 20 January 2026

Appearances and goals by club, season and competition
Club	Season	League			FA Cup		League Cup		Other		Total	
Club	Season	Division	Apps	Goals	Apps	Goals	Apps	Goals	Apps	Goals	Apps	Goals
Woking	2010–11	Conference South	19	2	0	0	—		1 (Note: Appearance in Conference South play-offs)	0	20	2
St Albans City (loan)	2010–11	Conference South	3	0	—		—		2 (Note: Appearances in FA Trophy)	1	5	1
Boreham Wood (loan)	2011–12	Conference South	7	1	—		—		—		7	1
Havant & Waterlooville	2011–12	Conference South	27	12	0	0	—		0	0	27	12
Havant & Waterlooville	2012–13	Conference South	42	25	0	0	—		2	0	44	25
Havant & Waterlooville	Total		69	37	0	0	—		2	0	71	37
Mansfield Town	2013–14	League Two	38	4	3	1	1	0	1 (Note: Appearance in Football League Trophy)	0	43	5
Mansfield Town	2014–15	League Two	16	1	4	1	0	0	1	0	21	2
Mansfield Town	Total		54	5	7	2	1	0	2	0	64	7
Grimsby Town (loan)	2014–15	Conference Premier	13	6	—		—		5 (Note: Two appearances in FA Trophy, three appearances and two goals in Conference Premier play-offs)	2	18	8
Leyton Orient	2015–16	League Two	45	7	3	2	1	0	1	0	50	9
Leyton Orient	2016–17	League Two	20	5	1	0	1	0	1 (Note: Appearance in EFL Trophy)	0	23	5
Leyton Orient	Total		65	12	4	2	2	0	2	0	73	14
Luton Town (loan)	2016–17	League Two	17	3	—		—		1 (Note: Appearance in League Two play-offs)	0	18	3
Lincoln City	2017–18	League Two	45	8	1	0	1	0	10 (Note: Eight appearances and three goals in EFL Trophy, two appearances in League Two play-offs)	3	57	11
Crawley Town	2018–19	League Two	40	14	2	2	0	0	1	0	43	16
Crawley Town	2019–20	League Two	28	13	1	1	4	0	0	0	33	14
Crawley Town	Total		68	27	3	3	4	0	1	0	76	30
AFC Wimbledon	2020–21	League One	23	5	2	0	0	0	2	0	27	5
AFC Wimbledon	2021–22	League One	18	5	3	3	3	0	1	0	25	8
AFC Wimbledon	Total		41	10	5	3	3	0	3	0	52	13
Wrexham	2021–22	National League	21	15	—		—		1 (Note: Appearance in the National League play-offs)	0	22	15
Wrexham	2022–23	National League	45	17	1	0	—		4	1	50	18
Wrexham	2023–24	League Two	39	7	3	1	2	0	2	0	46	8
Wrexham	2024–25	League One	27	3	1	0	0	0	3	0	31	3
Wrexham	2025–26	Championship	0	0	0	0	1	2	—		1	2
Wrexham	Total		132	42	5	1	3	2	10	1	150	46
Swindon Town	2025–26	League Two	20	5	2	2	0	0	2	1	24	8
Career total			553	158	27	13	14	2	41	8	635	181

== Honours ==
Lincoln City

- EFL Trophy: 2017–18

Wrexham

- EFL League One runner-up: 2024–25
- EFL League Two runner-up: 2023–24
- National League: 2022–23
- FA Trophy runner-up: 2021–22

Individual

- Conference South Player of the Year: 2012–13
- Conference South Golden Boot: 2012–13
- EFL Trophy Team of the Tournament: 2017–18
