= James Jones (footballer, born 1996) =

Scottish association football player

Personal information
- Full name: James Charles Jones
- Date of birth: 13 February 1996 (age 30)
- Place of birth: Dundee, Scotland
- Height: 6 ft 0 in (1.83 m)
- Position: Midfielder

Team information
- Current team: Crewe Alexandra
- Number: 24

Youth career
- –2014: Crewe Alexandra

Senior career*
| Years | Team | Apps | (Gls) |
| 2014–2020 | Crewe Alexandra | 167 | (19) |
| 2020–2021 | Lincoln City | 36 | (1) |
| 2021–2025 | Wrexham | 107 | (13) |
| 2025–2026 | Burton Albion | 4 | (0) |
| 2026– | Crewe Alexandra | 2 | (0) |

International career^{‡}
| 2014–2015 | Scotland U19 | 6 | (0) |
| 2016–2017 | Scotland U21 | 4 | (0) |
- * Club domestic league appearances and goals as of 16:40, 21 November 2026 (UTC) ‡ National team caps and goals as of 19:48, 4 April 2017 (UTC)

James Charles Jones (born 13 February 1996) is a Scottish professional footballer who plays as a midfielder for EFL League Two club Crewe Alexandra.

== Club career ==
=== Crewe Alexandra ===
Jones was born in Dundee. He made his first-team debut for Crewe Alexandra as a 76th-minute substitute for Danny Haynes in Crewe Alexandra's 1–1 away draw to Crawley Town on 1 November 2014. He scored his first Crewe goal in a 3–2 win at Colchester United on 7 February 2015.

In April 2017, Crewe triggered a contract clause keeping Jones at Crewe until June 2018. In August 2017, a potential transfer to an unnamed Championship side (later named as Preston North End) was cancelled due to concerns about a prolonged recovery from a hernia operation and a related pelvis issue. In mid-November 2017, he resumed light running on grass, having suffered some set-backs in his rehabilitation, but he suffered a medial ligament injury in training and in January 2018 was ruled out for the rest of the season, though he recovered to make six appearances, scoring once, before the season's end.

On 1 May 2018, Jones signed a new two-year contract until summer 2020. At Milton Keynes on 19 January 2019, Jones suffered a suspected broken fibula (later diagnosed as severe lateral ligament damage) that ruled him out for six weeks.

=== Lincoln City ===
In June 2020, after the 2019–20 season was terminated prematurely during the COVID-19 pandemic, Jones was offered a new contract by Crewe manager David Artell, but was linked with a move to Lincoln City. This was confirmed on 6 July 2020, with Jones joining Lincoln on a free transfer, signing a 3-year contract. He made his debut for Lincoln starting the game in the EFL Cup on 5 September 2020 and in the following round, he scored for Lincoln City in a 5–0 win over Bradford City.

=== Wrexham ===
On 24 August 2021, after just one season with Lincoln, Jones dropped down to the National League to join Wrexham on a three-year deal.

After helping the side to promotion to the EFL, he signed a new contract with the League Two club in October 2023, securing his future until June 2025.

=== Burton Albion ===
On 31 January 2025, Jones signed an 18-month contract with Burton Albion. After an injury-hit season, he was released at the end of the 2025–26 season.

=== Crewe Alexandra (second spell) ===
Having trained at the club while a free agent, in November 2026, Jones signed a short-term contract to rejoin Crewe Alexandra through to January 2027.

== International career ==
After making six appearances for Scotland U19s, Jones was selected to play for Scotland in the U21 European Championship qualifiers against Iceland and Macedonia in October 2016. He played the full 90 minutes of Scotland U21s' 2–0 defeat by Iceland in Reykjavík on 5 October, and 88 minutes of the following game, a 2–0 defeat by Macedonia in Skopje on 11 October. He then played in two friendlies: the November 2016 match against Slovakia and the March 2017 match against Estonia.

== Career statistics ==
As of 21 November 2026

Appearances and goals by club, season and competition
| Club | Season | League | | | FA Cup | | League Cup | | Other | | Total | |
| Club | Season | Division | Apps | Goals | Apps | Goals | Apps | Goals | Apps | Goals | Apps | Goals |
|---|---|---|---|---|---|---|---|---|---|---|---|---|
| Crewe Alexandra | 2014–15 | League One | 24 | 1 | 2 | 0 | 0 | 0 | 0 | 0 | 26 | 1 |
| Crewe Alexandra | 2015–16 | League One | 31 | 0 | 1 | 0 | 0 | 0 | 0 | 0 | 32 | 0 |
| Crewe Alexandra | 2016–17 | League Two | 45 | 10 | 2 | 1 | 2 | 0 | 1 (Note: Appearance(s) in EFL Trophy) | 0 | 50 | 11 |
| Crewe Alexandra | 2017–18 | League Two | 6 | 1 | 0 | 0 | 0 | 0 | 0 | 0 | 6 | 1 |
| Crewe Alexandra | 2018–19 | League Two | 38 | 5 | 0 | 0 | 1 | 0 | 3 | 1 | 42 | 6 |
| Crewe Alexandra | 2019–20 | League Two | 23 | 2 | 1 | 0 | 2 | 0 | 3 | 0 | 29 | 2 |
| Crewe Alexandra | Total | | 167 | 19 | 6 | 1 | 5 | 0 | 7 | 1 | 185 | 21 |
| Lincoln City | 2020–21 | League One | 36 | 1 | 2 | 1 | 3 | 1 | 4 | 0 | 45 | 3 |
| Lincoln City | Total | | 36 | 1 | 2 | 1 | 3 | 1 | 4 | 0 | 45 | 3 |
| Wrexham | 2021–22 | National League | 41 | 5 | 2 | 0 | 0 | 0 | 5 (Note: Appearances in FA Trophy) | 2 | 48 | 7 |
| Wrexham | 2022–23 | National League | 43 | 4 | 7 | 1 | 0 | 0 | 2 | 0 | 52 | 5 |
| Wrexham | 2023–24 | League Two | 21 | 4 | 4 | 0 | 2 | 0 | 3 | 0 | 30 | 4 |
| Wrexham | 2024–25 | League One | 2 | 0 | 0 | 0 | 1 | 0 | 3 | 0 | 6 | 0 |
| Wrexham | Total | | 107 | 13 | 13 | 1 | 3 | 0 | 13 | 2 | 136 | 16 |
| Burton Albion | 2024–25 | League One | 4 | 0 | 2 | 0 | 0 | 0 | 0 | 0 | 4 | 0 |
| Crewe Alexandra | 2026–27 | League Two | 2 | 0 | 0 | 0 | 0 | 0 | 1 | 0 | 3 | 0 |
| Career total | | | 316 | 33 | 23 | 3 | 11 | 1 | 25 | 3 | 373 | 40 |

== Honours ==
Crewe Alexandra

- League Two runner-up: 2019–20

Wrexham

- EFL League Two runner-up: 2023–24
- National League: 2022–23
- FA Trophy runner-up: 2021–22
