= Tyler French =

English footballer (born 1999)

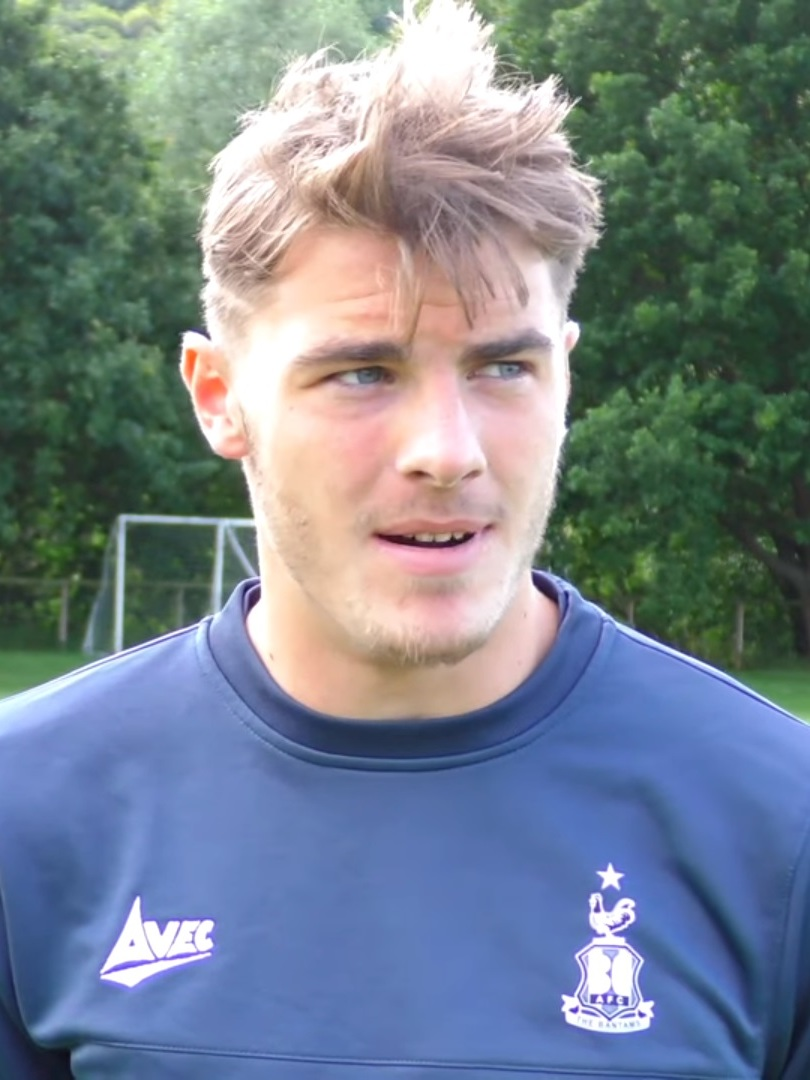
- French in July 2019 with Bradford City.

Personal information
- Full name: Tyler Jay French
- Date of birth: 12 February 1999 (age 27)
- Place of birth: Bury St Edmunds, England
- Height: 1.83 m (6 ft 0 in)
- Position: Central defender

Team information
- Current team: Solihull Moors
- Number: 26

Youth career
- 2014–2015: Long Melford
- 2015: Hadleigh United
- 2015–2016: A.F.C. Sudbury

Senior career*
Years	Team	Apps	(Gls)
2016–2019	A.F.C. Sudbury	96	(1)
2019–2021	Bradford City	16	(0)
2020	→ AFC Fylde (loan)	5	(0)
2021–2022	Wrexham	38	(0)
2022–2024	Dundee	18	(1)
2023–2024	→ Greenock Morton (loan)	32	(0)
2024–2025	Sutton United	41	(0)
2025–	Solihull Moors	39	(3)
- * Club domestic league appearances and goals as of 17:00, 5 September 2026 (UTC)

Tyler Jay French (born 12 February 1999) is an English professional footballer who plays as a defender for Solihull Moors. He has played in English football for AFC Sudbury, Bradford City, AFC Fylde (on loan) and Welsh side Wrexham, and in Scottish football for Dundee and Greenock Morton (on loan).

== Early and personal life ==
Born in Bury St Edmunds, French attended Ormiston Sudbury Academy. He grew up supporting Liverpool.

== Career ==
French spent his early career in non-league football with Long Melford, Hadleigh United and A.F.C. Sudbury. He combined his non-league playing career with a part-time job building conservatory bases. In early 2019 he trialled with Football League clubs Barnsley and Charlton Athletic, and was transfer listed by Sudbury in an attempt to move up the league system. He also had trials at Crystal Palace, Leicester City, and Ipswich Town.

Following a successful trial period, he signed a two-year professional contract with League Two club Bradford City in May 2019. French said that he would be spending the summer before the start of the 2019–20 season training, stating that "I won't have much time off because I want to get myself in the best shape possible for pre-season [...] I've got an off-season [training] programme to help me but I'm quite naturally fit, so hopefully I'll be all right". He scored his first goal for Bradford when he scored in an EFL Trophy tie against Rochdale on 12 November 2019.

In February 2020 he moved on loan to AFC Fylde. He credited his time at Fyle for helping him getting used to a higher level of football.

French was praised by club captain Richard O'Donnell after an impressive performance in the opening day of the 2020–21 season. On 31 January 2021 it was announced that he had left the club.

On 1 February 2021, he signed for Wrexham. He was sent off on his debut for the club a day later.

On 5 July 2022, French joined Scottish Championship side Dundee for an undisclosed fee on a two-year deal. He made his competitive debut for Dundee in an away Scottish League Cup win over Stranraer, starting the match. The following week, French scored his first goal for the club in a 5–1 win over Forfar Athletic. On 21 January 2023, French suffered a serious injury to his right leg during a Scottish Cup match against St Mirren, which would leave him out of action for the rest of the season. Despite his injury, French would win the Scottish Championship with Dundee at the end of the season.

French would make his competitive return in August 2023 with Dundee's B team in a Scottish Challenge Cup fixture against East Fife.

On 12 September 2023, French signed for Scottish Championship club Greenock Morton on a season-long loan. He made his debut in a draw away to Dundee United. The following week, French again suffered an injury to his right leg and was stretchered off against Dunfermline Athletic. Fortunately, it was not a serious injury and French started for the Ton the following week. On 20 May 2024, Dundee confirmed that French would depart at the expiry of his contract.

On 12 June 2024, French joined National League club Sutton United on a permanent contract. French made his debut on 10 August in the league opener against Tamworth.

On 12 June 2025, he joined fellow National League side Solihull Moors.

== Career statistics ==
As of 5 September 2026

Appearances and goals by club, season and competition
Club	Season	League			National Cup		League Cup		Other		Total	
Club	Season	Division	Apps	Goals	Apps	Goals	Apps	Goals	Apps	Goals	Apps	Goals
A.F.C. Sudbury	2015–16	Isthmian League Division One North	4	0	0	0	—		0	0	4	0
A.F.C. Sudbury	2016–17	Isthmian League Premier Division	24	0	0	0	—		6	0	30	0
A.F.C. Sudbury	2017–18	Isthmian League North Division	40	0	5	0	—		5	0	50	0
A.F.C. Sudbury	2018–19	Isthmian League North Division	28	1	5	0	—		3	0	36	1
A.F.C. Sudbury	Total		96	1	10	0	0	0	14	0	120	1
Bradford City	2019–20	League Two	2	0	0	0	1	0	3 (Note: Appearance(s) in the EFL Trophy.)	1	6	1
Bradford City	2020–21	League Two	14	0	1	0	2	0	2	0	19	0
Bradford City	Total		16	0	1	0	3	0	5	1	25	1
AFC Fylde (loan)	2019–20	National League	5	0	0	0	0	0	0	0	5	0
Wrexham	2020–21	National League	17	0	0	0	0	0	0	0	17	0
Wrexham	2021–22	National League	21	0	1	0	0	0	2 (Note: Appearances in the Football League Trophy and the National League play-offs)	0	24	0
Wrexham	Total		38	0	1	0	0	0	2	0	41	0
Dundee	2022–23	Scottish Championship	18	1	1	0	5	1	1 (Note: Appearance(s) in the Scottish Challenge Cup)	0	25	2
Dundee	2023–24	Scottish Premiership	0	0	0	0	0	0	0	0	0	0
Dundee	Total		18	1	1	0	5	1	1	0	25	2
Dundee B	2023–24	—			—		—		1	0	1	0
Greenock Morton (loan)	2023–24	Scottish Championship	32	0	2	0	—		0	0	34	0
Sutton United	2024–25	National League	41	0	2	0	0	0	1 (Note: Appearances in FA Trophy)	0	44	0
Solihull Moors	2025–26	National League	36	2	0	0	0	0	0	0	36	2
Solihull Moors	2026–27	National League	3	1	0	0	0	0	1	0	4	1
Solihull Moors	Total		39	3	0	0	0	0	1	0	40	3
Career total			285	5	17	0	8	1	25	1	335	7

== Honours ==
Dundee

- Scottish Championship: 2022–23
