= 2026–27 Wrexham A.F.C. season =

Wrexham A.F.C.
2026–27 season
- Owner: Wrexham Holdings LLC
- Chairman: Rob Mac; Ryan Reynolds
- Manager: Phil Parkinson
- Stadium: Racecourse Ground
- EFL Cup: First round
- Top goalscorer: League: Kieffer Moore (5); All: Kieffer Moore (5)
- Highest home attendance: 10,631 (7 November 2026 vs Wolverhampton Wanderers)
- Lowest home attendance: 10,494 (8 September 2026 vs Burnley)
- Average home league attendance: 10,544
- Biggest win: 4–1 (17 October 2026 vs Preston North End)
- Biggest defeat: 0–6 (11 September 2026 vs West Ham United)
Home colours	Away colours
- All statistics correct as of 21 November 2026.

The 2026–27 season is the 162nd season in the history of Wrexham Association Football Club and their second consecutive season in the EFL Championship. In addition to the league, they will also compete in the FA Cup and the EFL Cup.

== First-team squad ==
As of 3 September 2026

No.	Player	Nat.	Pos.	Date of birth (age)	Previous club	Signed on	Contract ends	Apps.	Goals
Goalkeepers
21	Danny Ward	(Wales)	GK	22 June 1993 (age 33)	Leicester City	1 July 2025	30 June 2027	9	0
22	Anthony Patterson	(England)	GK	10 May 2000 (age 26)	Sunderland	11 August 2026	30 June 2030	0	0
25	Callum Burton	(England)	GK	15 August 1996 (age 30)	Plymouth Argyle	15 July 2024	30 June 2027	10	0
Defenders
2	Callum Doyle	(England)	DF	3 October 2003 (age 23)	Manchester City	21 August 2025	30 June 2029	39	3
3	Jacques Ekomié	(Gabon)	LB	19 August 2003 (age 23)	Angers	27 August 2026	30 June 2030	0	0
4	Max Cleworth	(England)	CB	9 August 2002 (age 24)	Academy	1 February 2021	30 June 2029	192	13
5	Dominic Hyam	(Scotland)	CB	20 December 1995 (age 30)	Blackburn Rovers	1 September 2025	30 June 2027	43	1
6	Joe Worrall	(England)	CB	10 January 1997 (age 29)	Burnley	1 September 2026	30 June 2028	0	0
12	Issa Kaboré	(Burkina Faso)	RWB	12 May 2001 (age 25)	Manchester City	27 August 2026	30 June 2029	0	0
13	Liberato Cacace	New Zealand	LB	27 September 2000 (age 26)	Empoli	18 July 2025	30 June 2028	11	1
26	Zak Vyner	(Kenya)	CB	14 May 1997 (age 29)	Bristol City	1 February 2026	30 June 2029	9	0
30	Danny Imray	(England)	RB	27 July 2003 (age 23)	Crystal Palace	29 July 2026	30 June 2030	0	0
34	Aaron James	(England)	CB	30 June 2005 (age 21)	Academy	1 July 2023	30 June 2027	9	1
Midfielders
6	Benjamin Whiteman	(England)	DM	17 June 1996 (age 30)	Preston North End	5 August 2026	30 June 2029	0	0
10	Josh Windass	(England)	AM	9 January 1994 (age 32)	Sheffield Wednesday	23 July 2025	30 June 2028	46	17
14	George Thomason	(England)	MF	12 January 2001 (age 25)	Bolton Wanderers	21 July 2025	30 June 2028	39	1
15	George Dobson	(England)	MF	15 November 1997 (age 29)	Charlton Athletic	6 July 2024	30 June 2028	94	4
17	Callum O'Hare	(England)	AM	1 May 1998 (age 28)	Sheffield United	1 September 2026	30 June 2029	0	0
18	Ben Sheaf	(England)	DM	5 February 1998 (age 28)	Coventry City	1 September 2025	30 June 2028	30	0
20	Oliver Rathbone	(England)	CM	10 October 1996 (age 30)	Rotherham United	9 August 2024	30 June 2028	78	16
23	Sebastian Revan	(England)	MF	14 July 2003 (age 23)	Aston Villa	15 July 2024	30 June 2027	27	1
27	Lewis O'Brien	(England)	CM	14 October 1998 (age 28)	Nottingham Forest	24 July 2025	30 June 2028	45	4
37	Matty James	(England)	CM	22 July 1991 (age 35)	Bristol City	25 October 2024	30 June 2027	72	3
47	Ryan Longman	(England)	MF	6 November 2000 (age 26)	Hull City	24 January 2025	30 June 2027	61	3
Forwards
11	Bailey Cadamarteri	(Jamaica)	FW	9 May 2005 (age 21)	Sheffield Wednesday	2 February 2026	30 June 2029	3	0
19	Kieffer Moore	(Wales)	FW	8 August 1992 (age 34)	Sheffield United	5 August 2025	30 June 2028	43	13
28	Sam Smith	(England)	FW	8 March 1998 (age 28)	Reading	31 January 2025	30 June 2029	66	17
33	Nathan Broadhead	(Wales)	FW	5 April 1998 (age 28)	Ipswich Town	14 August 2025	30 June 2029	41	8
Out on Loan
–	Ryan Barnett	(England)	MF	23 September 1999 (age 27)	Milton Keynes Dons	24 February 2023	30 June 2027	112	4
–	Modou Faal	(The Gambia)	FW	11 February 2003 (age 23)	West Bromwich Albion	30 August 2024	30 June 2027	16	3
–	Ryan Hardie	(Scotland)	FW	17 March 1997 (age 29)	Plymouth Argyle	16 June 2025	30 June 2028	10	1
–	Davis Keillor-Dunn	(England)	FW	2 November 1997 (age 29)	Barnsley	2 February 2026	30 June 2029	13	1
–	Alex Moore	(England)	MF	18 September 2006 (age 20)	Academy	1 July 2025	30 June 2027	0	0
–	Arthur Okonkwo	(Nigeria)	GK	9 September 2001 (age 25)	Arsenal	1 September 2023	30 June 2027	121	0
–	Rio Owen	(Wales)	FW	20 September 2006 (age 20)	Academy	1 July 2025	30 June 2027	0	0

== Transfers and contracts ==
=== In ===
Date	Pos.	Nat.	Name	From	Fee	Ref.
29 July 2026	RB	(England)	Danny Imray	(England) Crystal Palace	£5,000,000	
5 August 2026	CM	(England)	Benjamin Whiteman	(England) Preston North End	£3,000,000	
11 August 2026	GK	(England)	Anthony Patterson	(England) Sunderland	£8,000,000	
27 August 2026	LB	(Gabon)	Jacques Ekomié	(France) Angers	£7,000,000	
27 August 2026	RWB	(Burkina Faso)	Issa Kaboré	(England) Manchester City	£2,000,000	
1 September 2026	CB	(England)	Joe Worrall	(England) Burnley	£2,000,000	
1 September 2026	AM	(England)	Callum O'Hare	(England) Sheffield United	£6,500,000	

Expenditure: ▼£31,500,000

=== Out ===
Date	Pos.	Nat.	Name	To	Fee	Ref.
12 August 2026	CB	(England)	Lewis Brunt	(England) Bolton Wanderers	£500,000	
1 September 2026	CB	(England)	Dan Scarr	(England) Salford City	Undisclosed	
1 September 2026	RM	(Wales)	Harry Ashfield	(England) Peterborough United	Undisclosed	

Income: ▲£500,000

=== Loaned in ===
Date	Pos.	Nat.	Name	From	Date until	Ref.

=== Loaned out ===
Date	Pos.	Nat.	Name	To	Until	Ref.
8 July 2026	FW	(The Gambia)	Modou Faal	(England) Port Vale	End of Season	
11 August 2026	FW	(Scotland)	Ryan Hardie	(England) Bolton Wanderers	End of Season	
14 August 2026	FW	(Wales)	Rio Owen	(England) AFC Telford United	End of Season	
20 August 2026	MF	(England)	Ryan Barnett	(England) MK Dons	End of Season	
20 August 2026	GK	(Nigeria)	Arthur Okonkwo	(England) Charlton Athletic	End of Season	
1 September 2026	MF	(England)	Alex Moore	(Wales) Colwyn Bay	1 January 2027	
3 September 2026	FW	(England)	Davis Keillor-Dunn	(England) Sheffield Wednesday	1 January 2027	

=== Released / Out of Contract ===
Date	Pos.	Nat.	Name	Subsequent club	Joined date	Ref.
26 June 2026	CF	(England)	Paul Mullin	(England) Rotherham United	29 July 2026	
30 June 2026	CB	(Republic of Ireland)	Thomas O'Connor	(England) Peterborough United	1 July 2026	
30 June 2026	RWB	(Portugal)	Daymeon Almeida	Currently unattached		
30 June 2026	CB	(England)	Casey Bedford	(Wales) Holywell Town	1 July 2026	
30 June 2026	CM	(England)	Andy Cannon	(England) Fleetwood Town	14 July 2026	
30 June 2026	RW	(England)	Callum Edwards	(England) Warrington Town	15 August 2026	
30 June 2026	GK	(Republic of Ireland)	Reuben Egan	(England) Worthing (Note: Dual registration with Basingstoke Town)	10 October 2026	
30 June 2026	CM	(England)	Tom Kelly	(Wales) Bala Town	5 July 2026	
30 June 2026	CF	(Pakistan)	Umar Nawaz	(Finland) Kajaanin Haka	12 September 2026	
30 June 2026	CB	(Wales)	Max Purvis	(Wales) Bangor City 1876	1 July 2026	
30 June 2026	CF	(England)	Jay Rodriguez	Retired		
31 August 2026	CB	(England)	Conor Coady	Retired		
1 September 2026	AM	(England)	Elliot Lee	Currently unattached		

=== New contracts ===
Date	Pos.	Nat.	Name	Contract expiry	Ref.
15 May 2026	RB	(England)	Aaron James	30 June 2027	
15 May 2026	CM	(England)	Alex Moore	30 June 2027	
15 May 2026	CF	(Wales)	Rio Owen	30 June 2027	
1 August 2026	FW	(England)	Sam Smith	30 June 2029	

== Pre-season and friendlies ==
On 28 January, Wrexham announced their first pre-season friendly against Wisła Kraków to celebrate the Polish sides 120th anniversary. In March, a pre-season tour in the United States was also announced with matches against Liverpool, Leeds United and Sunderland. In April, a trip to Helsinki to play Manchester United was added.

Win Draw Loss Fixtures

11 July 2026 Friendly	Wisła Kraków	0–0	Wrexham	Kraków, Poland
15:00 CEST		Report		Stadium: Henryk Reyman Municipal Stadium

18 July 2026 Friendly	Manchester United	0–1	Wrexham	Töölö, Finland
18:00 EEST	Kamason (yellow card) 64'	Report	Smith 39'	Stadium: Helsinki Olympic Stadium; Attendance: 20,069; Referee: Mohammad Al-Emara

25 July 2026 Friendly	Leeds United	2–3	Wrexham	Tampa, Florida, United States
19:30 EDT	Piroe (penalty missed) 8', 29'; Longstaff 45'	Report	K. Moore 1'; Cadamarteri 45'; Smith 85'	Stadium: Raymond James Stadium

29 July 2026 Friendly	Liverpool	1–0	Wrexham	The Bronx, New York, United States
19:30 EDT	Ngumoha 75'	Report		Stadium: Yankee Stadium; Attendance: 42,204; Referee: Lorenzo Hernandez

2 August 2026 Friendly	Sunderland	1–0	Wrexham	Chester, Pennsylvania, United States
12:00 EDT	Mukiele 34'; Diarra (yellow card) 61'; Seelt (yellow card) 65'	Report	Hyam (yellow card) 32'; Dobson (yellow card) 56'	Stadium: Subaru Park; Attendance: 16,967; Referee: Rosendo Mendoza

== Competitions ==
=== Overall record ===
Competition	First match	Last match	Starting round	Final position	Record							
Competition	First match	Last match	Starting round	Final position	Pld	W	D	L	GF	GA	GD	Win %
Championship	17 August 2026	1 May 2027	Matchday 1		16	5	6	5	19	20	−1	31.25
FA Cup	January 2027		Third round		0	0	0	0	0	0	+0	—
EFL Cup	7 August 2026	7 August 2026	First round	First round	1	0	0	1	0	1	−1	0.00
Total					17	5	6	6	19	21	−2	29.41

Last updated: 21 November 2026
Source: Soccerway

=== Championship ===
==== League table ====
Pos	Team	Pld	W	D	L	GF	GA	GD	Pts
12	Portsmouth	16	6	5	5	21	19	+2	23
13	Blackburn Rovers	16	6	4	6	24	25	−1	22
14	Wrexham	16	5	6	5	19	20	−1	21
15	Cardiff City	16	4	6	6	28	29	−1	18
16	Millwall	16	5	3	8	23	28	−5	18

Updated to match(es) played on 22 November 2026. Source: EFL Official Website
Rules for classification: 1) Points; 2) Goal difference; 3) Number of goals scored; 4) Head-to-head results; 5) Wins; 6) Away goals; 7) Penalty points (sec 9.5); 8) Number of 12-point sending off offences; 9) Play-off (only if needed to determine promotion/relegation)

==== Results summary ====
Overall								Home						Away					
Pld	W	D	L	GF	GA	GD	Pts	W	D	L	GF	GA	GD	W	D	L	GF	GA	GD
16	5	6	5	19	20	−1	21	3	3	2	13	9	+4	2	3	3	6	11	−5

Last updated: 21 November 2026.
Source: Soccerway

==== Results by round ====
Round	1	2	3	4	5	6	7	8	9	10	11	12	13	14	15	16	17	18	19	20	21	22	23	24	25	26	27	28	29	30	31	32	33	34	35	36	37	38	39	40	41	42	43	44	45	46
Ground	A	H	H	A	A	H	A	H	A	H	H	A	A	H	H	A	A	H	A	H	A	H	A	H	H	A	H	A	A	H	H	A	A	H	A	H	A	H	H	A	A	H	A	H	A	H
Result	D	D	L	W	D	D	L	W	D	L	W	L	L	W	D	W																														
Position	13	13	20	11	11	14	19	14	15	17	14	17	18	16	15	14																														
Points	1	2	2	5	6	7	7	10	11	11	14	14	14	17	18	21																														

Source: EFL
A = Away; H = Home; W = Win; D = Draw; L = Loss

==== Matches ====
On 25 June, the Championship fixtures were revealed.

Win Draw Loss Fixtures

17 August 2026 1	Cardiff City	1–1	Wrexham	Cardiff
20:00 BST	R. Colwill 90+8'	Report	Moore 3' (yellow card) 33'; Hyam (yellow card) 54'	Stadium: Cardiff City Stadium; Attendance: 31,421 (3,000 away); Referee: Andrew Kitchen
Note: Live on Sky Sports

22 August 2026 2	Wrexham	1–1	Watford	Wrexham
15:00 BST	Imray 22'; Broadhead (yellow card) 20'; Whiteman (yellow card) 72'	Report	Kjerrumgaard 14'	Stadium: Cae Ras; Attendance: 10,502; Referee: John Busby

28 August 2026 3	Wrexham	1–2	Birmingham City	Wrexham
20:00 BST	Doyle 54'; Cadamarteri (yellow card) 90+3'	Report	Cochrane (yellow card) 7'; Neumann 13', 63'; Osayi-Samuel (yellow card) 50'	Stadium: Cae Ras; Attendance: 10,536; Referee: Robert Jones
Note: Fixture was initially scheduled for 29 August, but was brought forward for live Sky Sports.

2 September 2026 4	Millwall	0–3	Wrexham	London
19:45 BST	Dykes (yellow card) 56'	Report	Sturge 28' (o.g.); Whiteman (yellow card) 36'; Moore 52'; Ekomié 69'	Stadium: The Den; Attendance: 17,840 (663 away); Referee: Oliver Langford

5 September 2026 5	Swansea City	0–0	Wrexham	Swansea
20:00 BST	Opoku (yellow card) 67'; Cabano (yellow card) 76'; Welsh (yellow card) 88'	Report		Stadium: Swansea.com Stadium; Attendance: 20,056; Referee: Elliot Bell
Note: Fixture was initially scheduled for a 15:00 kick-off, but was pushed back for live Sky Sports.

8 September 2026 6	Wrexham	1–1	Burnley	Wrexham
19:45 BST	Kaboré (yellow card) 14'; Ekomié 55'; Hyam (yellow card) 84'	Report	Amdouni 26' Ramsey (yellow card) 65' Pires (yellow card) 86' Hatate (yellow card) 90'	Stadium: Cae Ras; Attendance: 10,494; Referee: Tim Robinson

11 September 2026 7	West Ham United	6–0	Wrexham	Stratford
20:00 BST	Bowen 28'; Piroe 37'; Mavropanos 48'; Castellanos 63'; Kanté 76'; Solomon 82'; Scarles (yellow card) 94'	Report		Stadium: London Stadium; Attendance: 59,712; Referee: Samuel Barrott
Note: Fixture was initially scheduled for 12 September, but was brought forward for live Sky Sports.

19 September 2026 8	Wrexham	2–1	Southampton	Wrexham
15:00 BST	Moore 35'; Hyam (yellow card) 86'; Schlotterbeck 89' (o.g.)	Report	Larin (yellow card) 14'; Ward-Prowse 50'; Wood (yellow card) 69'; Manning (yellow card) 90+2'; Downes (yellow card) 90+5'	Stadium: Cae Ras; Attendance: 10,543; Referee: Gavin Ward

10 October 2026 9	Derby County	1–1	Wrexham	Derby
15:00 BST	Langås (yellow card) 5'; Szmodics 9'; Hedges (yellow card) 52'; Mowatt (yellow card) 74'	Report	Rathbone (yellow card) 71' (goal) 88'; Moore (yellow card) 90+1'	Stadium: Pride Park Stadium; Attendance: 29,136; Referee: Matthew Donohue

13 October 2026 10	Wrexham	1–2	West Bromwich Albion	Wrexham
19:45 BST	Moore 64'; Vyner (yellow card) 83'		Nzingoula (yellow card) 39'; Price 79'; Heggebø 84'	Stadium: Cae Ras; Attendance: 10,500; Referee: Thomas Kirk

17 October 2026 11	Wrexham	4–1	Preston North End	Wrexham
15:00 BST	Whiteman (yellow card) 21', (goal) 42'; Worrall 31'; Smith 59'; Moore 63'; Doyle (yellow card) 80'	Report	Vukčević (yellow card) 9'; Devine 36'; Hughes (yellow card) 62'; Thompson (yellow card) 66'; Leroy (yellow card) 80'	Stadium: Cae Ras; Attendance: 10,614; Referee: Simon Hooper

24 October 2026 12	Blackburn Rovers	2–0	Wrexham	Blackburn
15:00 BST	Pickering (yellow card) 16'; Guðjohnsen 44', 79'; Morsy (yellow card) 65'<Br.>Cantwell (yellow card) 80'	Report	Hyam (yellow card) 27'; James (yellow card) 45'	Stadium: Ewood Park; Attendance: 15,399; Referee: Matthew Corlett

30 October 2026 13	Sheffield United	1–0	Wrexham	Sheffield
20:00 GMT	Díaz 30'; Kitching (yellow card) 55'; Phillips (yellow card) 67'	Report	Doyle (yellow card) 27'	Stadium: Bramall Lane; Attendance: 26,512; Referee: David Webb
Note: Fixture was initially scheduled for 31 October, but was brought forward for live Sky Sports.

4 November 2026 14	Wrexham	2–0	Middlesbrough	Wrexham
19:45 GMT	Dobson (yellow card) 62'; Thomason 70'; Rathbone 84'	Report		Stadium: Cae Ras; Attendance: 10,532; Referee: Oliver Langford

7 November 2026 15	Wrexham	1–1	Wolverhampton Wanderers	Wrexham
12:30 GMT	O'Brien 27' (Kabore); Ekomié (yellow card) 54'; Parkinson (yellow card) 61'; James (yellow card) 86'	Report	Armstrong 25' (Djiga); Toti (yellow card) 30'; André (yellow card) 61'	Stadium: Cae Ras; Attendance: 10,631; Referee: Andrew Kitchen
Note: Fixture was initially scheduled for a 15:00 kick-off, but was pushed back for live Sky Sports.

21 November 2026 16	Lincoln City	0–1	Wrexham	Lincoln
15:00 GMT	Oyegoke (yellow card) 51'	Report	Thomason 82'	Stadium: Sincil Bank; Attendance: 10,165 (877 away); Referee: Edward Duckworth

24 November 2026 17	Bristol City	v	Wrexham	Bristol
19:45 GMT				Stadium: Ashton Gate

28 November 2026 18	Wrexham	Portsmouth	Wrexham
15:00 GMT			Stadium: Cae Ras

5 December 2026 19	Norwich City	Wrexham	Norwich
15:00 GMT			Stadium: Carrow Road

8 December 2026 20	Wrexham	v	Charlton Athletic	Wrexham
19:45 GMT				Stadium: Cae Ras

11 December 2026 21	Bolton Wanderers	v	Wrexham	Bolton (Horwich)
20:00 GMT				Stadium: Toughsheet Community Stadium
Note: Fixture was initially scheduled for 12 December, but was brought forward for live Sky Sports.

19 December 2026 22	Wrexham	Queens Park Rangers	Wrexham
15:00 GMT			Stadium: Cae Ras

26 December 2026 23	Stoke City	Wrexham	Stoke-on-Trent
15:00 GMT			Stadium: bet365 Stadium

29 December 2026 24	Wrexham	Blackburn Rovers	Wrexham
18:00 GMT			Stadium: Cae Ras
Note: Fixture was initially scheduled for a 19:45 kick-off, but was pushed forward for live Sky Sports.

1 January 2027 25	Wrexham	Bolton Wanderers	Wrexham
15:00 GMT			Stadium: Cae Ras

16 January 2027 26	Preston North End	Wrexham	Preston
15:00 GMT			Stadium: Deepdale

23 January 2027 27	Wrexham	Sheffield United	Wrexham
15:00 GMT			Stadium: Cae Ras

27 January 2027 28	Middlesbrough	Wrexham	Middlesbrough
19:45 GMT			Stadium: Riverside Stadium

30 January 2027 29	Wolverhampton Wanderers	Wrexham	Wolverhampton
12:30 GMT			Stadium: Molineux Stadium
Note: Fixture was initially scheduled for a 15:00 kick-off, but was brought forward for live Sky Sports broadcasting.

6 February 2027 30	Wrexham	Lincoln City	Wrexham
12:30 GMT			Stadium: Cae Ras
Note: Fixture was initially scheduled for a 15:00 kick-off, but was brought forward for live Sky Sports broadcasting.

13 February 2027 31	Wrexham	West Ham United	Wrexham
15:00 GMT			Stadium: Cae Ras

16 February 2027 32	West Bromwich Albion	Wrexham	West Bromwich
19:45 GMT			Stadium: The Hawthorns

20 February 2027 33	Southampton	Wrexham	Southampton
15:00 GMT			Stadium: St Mary's Stadium

27 February 2027 34	Wrexham	Derby County	Wrexham
15:00 GMT			Stadium: Cae Ras

2 March 2027 35	Watford	Wrexham	Watford
19:45 GMT			Stadium: Vicarage Road

6 March 2027 36	Wrexham	Cardiff City	Wrexham
15:00 GMT			Stadium: Cae Ras

13 March 2027 37	Portsmouth	Wrexham	Portsmouth (Milton)
15:00 GMT			Stadium: Fratton Park

16 March 2027 38	Wrexham	Norwich City	Wrexham
19:45 GMT			Stadium: Cae Ras

20 March 2027 39	Wrexham	Stoke City	Wrexham
15:00 GMT			Stadium: Cae Ras

3 April 2027 40	Queens Park Rangers	Wrexham	London (Shepherd's Bush)
15:00 BST			Stadium: Loftus Road

6 April 2027 41	Burnley	Wrexham	Burnley
19:45 BST			Stadium: Turf Moor

10 April 2027 42	Wrexham	Swansea City	Wrexham
15:00 BST			Stadium: Cae Ras

17 April 2027 43	Birmingham City	Wrexham	Birmingham (Bordesley)
15:00 BST			Stadium: St Andrew's

20 April 2027 44	Wrexham	Millwall	Wrexham
19:45 BST			Stadium: Cae Ras

24 April 2027 45	Charlton Athletic	Wrexham	London (Charlton)
15:00 BST			Stadium: The Valley

1 May 2027 46	Wrexham	Bristol City	Wrexham
12:30 BST			Stadium: Cae Ras

=== FA Cup ===
Win Draw Loss Fixtures

=== EFL Cup ===
Wrexham were drawn away to Middlesbrough in the first round.

Win Draw Loss Fixtures

7 August 2026 First round	Middlesbrough	1–0	Wrexham	Middlesbrough
20:00 BST	Lankshear 61', (yellow card) 69'	Report	O'Brien (yellow card) 43'; Smith (yellow card) 56'; Hyam (yellow card) 85'; Doyle (yellow card) 90+1'	Stadium: Riverside Stadium; Attendance: 18,221; Referee: Will Finnie

== Statistics ==
As of 21 November 2026

=== Appearances and goals ===
Players with no appearances are not included on the list; italics indicate a loaned in player

No.	Pos	Nat	Player	Total		Championship		FA Cup		EFL Cup	
No.	Pos	Nat	Player	Apps	Goals	Apps	Goals	Apps	Goals	Apps	Goals
2	DF	(England) ENG	Callum Doyle	16	1	15+0	1	0+0	0	1+0	0
3	DF	(Gabon) GAB	Jacques Ekomié	14	2	12+2	2	0+0	0	0+0	0
4	DF	(England) ENG	Max Cleworth	8	0	6+2	0	0+0	0	0+0	0
5	DF	(Scotland) SCO	Dominic Hyam	14	0	12+1	0	0+0	0	1+0	0
6	DF	(England) ENG	Joe Worrall	8	1	8+0	1	0+0	0	0+0	0
8	MF	(England) ENG	Benjamin Whiteman	16	1	14+1	1	0+0	0	0+1	0
10	MF	(England) ENG	Josh Windass	6	0	4+2	0	0+0	0	0+0	0
11	FW	(Jamaica) JAM	Bailey Cadamarteri	7	0	0+6	0	0+0	0	0+1	0
12	DF	(Burkina Faso) BFA	Issa Kaboré	14	0	10+4	0	0+0	0	0+0	0
14	MF	(England) ENG	George Thomason	6	2	3+2	2	0+0	0	1+0	0
15	MF	(England) ENG	George Dobson	11	0	5+5	0	0+0	0	0+1	0
17	MF	(England) ENG	Callum O'Hare	8	0	7+1	0	0+0	0	0+0	0
18	MF	(England) ENG	Ben Sheaf	6	0	2+4	0	0+0	0	0+0	0
19	FW	(Wales) WAL	Kieffer Moore	17	5	14+2	5	0+0	0	0+1	0
20	MF	(England) ENG	Oliver Rathbone	14	2	8+5	2	0+0	0	1+0	0
21	GK	(Wales) WAL	Danny Ward	1	0	0+0	0	0+0	0	1+0	0
22	GK	(England) ENG	Anthony Patterson	16	0	16+0	0	0+0	0	0+0	0
26	DF	(Kenya) KEN	Zak Vyner	9	0	7+1	0	0+0	0	1+0	0
27	MF	(England) ENG	Lewis O'Brien	16	1	11+4	1	0+0	0	1+0	0
28	FW	(England) ENG	Sam Smith	14	1	4+9	1	0+0	0	1+0	0
30	DF	(England) ENG	Danny Imray	14	1	6+7	1	0+0	0	1+0	0
33	MF	(Wales) WAL	Nathan Broadhead	4	0	3+0	0	0+0	0	1+0	0
37	MF	(England) ENG	Matty James	12	0	7+4	0	0+0	0	1+0	0
47	MF	(England) ENG	Ryan Longman	10	0	1+8	0	0+0	0	0+1	0
Players who featured but departed the club during the season:
7	MF	(England) ENG	Davis Keillor-Dunn	2	0	0+1	0	0+0	0	0+1	0

=== Assists ===
Rank	Position	Nation	Number	Name	Championship	FA Cup	EFL Cup	Total
1	RB	(Burkina Faso)	12	Issa Kaboré	4	0	0	4
2	RB	(England)	30	Danny Imray	3	0	0	3
3	CM	(England)	8	Benjamin Whiteman	2	0	0	2
3	CF	(Wales)	19	Kieffer Moore	2	0	0	2
3	CM	(England)	27	Lewis O'Brien	2	0	0	2
6	CB	(England)	6	Joe Worrall	1	0	0	1
6	CAM	(England)	10	Josh Windass	1	0	0	1
6	CM	(England)	20	Oliver Rathbone	1	0	0	1
Total					16	0	0	16

=== Clean sheets ===
Rank	Position	Nation	Number	Name	Championship	FA Cup	EFL Cup	Total
1	GK	(England)	22	Anthony Patterson	4	0	0	4
Total					4	0	0	4

=== Disciplinary record ===
Rank	Position	Nation	Number	Name	Championship			FA Cup			EFL Cup			Total		
Rank	Position	Nation	Number	Name	Yellow card	(yellow card) (yellow-red card)	Red card	Yellow card	(yellow card) (yellow-red card)	Red card	Yellow card	(yellow card) (yellow-red card)	Red card	Yellow card	(yellow card) (yellow-red card)	Red card
1	CB	(Scotland)	5	Dominic Hyam	4	0	0	0	0	0	1	0	0	5	0	0
2	CM	(England)	8	Benjamin Whiteman	3	0	0	0	0	0	0	0	0	3	0	0
2	CB	(England)	2	Callum Doyle	2	0	0	0	0	0	1	0	0	3	0	0
3	FW	(Wales)	19	Kieffer Moore	2	0	0	0	0	0	0	0	0	2	0	0
3	CM	(England)	37	Matty James	2	0	0	0	0	0	0	0	0	2	0	0
5	CF	(Jamaica)	11	Bailey Cadamarteri	1	0	0	0	0	0	0	0	0	1	0	0
5	RB	(Burkina Faso)	12	Issa Kaboré	1	0	0	0	0	0	0	0	0	1	0	0
5	CDM	(England)	15	George Dobson	1	0	0	0	0	0	0	0	0	1	0	0
5	CM	(England)	20	Oliver Rathbone	1	0	0	0	0	0	0	0	0	1	0	0
5	CB	(Kenya)	26	Zak Vyner	1	0	0	0	0	0	0	0	0	1	0	0
5	CM	(England)	27	Lewis O'Brien	0	0	0	0	0	0	1	0	0	1	0	0
5	CF	(England)	28	Sam Smith	0	0	0	0	0	0	1	0	0	1	0	0
5	LW	(Wales)	33	Nathan Broadhead	1	0	0	0	0	0	0	0	0	1	0	0
5	RB	(Gabon)	3	Jacques Ekomié	1	0	0	0	0	0	0	0	0	1	0	0
Total					19	0	0	0	0	0	4	0	0	23	0	0

== Awards ==
=== Player awards ===
==== EFL Championship Goal of the Month ====
Month	Player	Opposition	Result	Ref.
October	(Wales) Kieffer Moore	v. West Bromwich Albion	Nominated	
