= Wrexham A.F.C. Player of the Season =

- Sport: Association football
- Awarded for: Being the best performing Wrexham player over the course of a season
- Presented by: Wrexham A.F.C.

History
- First award: 1976; 50 years ago
- Editions: 50 (as of 2026)
- First winner: (Wales) Brian Lloyd
- Most wins: (England) Paul Mullin (3 times)
- Most recent: (England) Josh Windass (2025–26)

The Wrexham Player of the Season award is an official award given by Wrexham Association Football Club to the best performing player from the club over the course of the season. The award is given based on votes by Wrexham supporters on the club's website.

The inaugural award was given to goalkeeper Brian Lloyd in 1976 and it has been presented every season since. The award has been given to 42 different players over the course of 49 seasons, with five players being awarded on more than one occasion. Of these five players, only Paul Mullin has won the award three times, in three consecutive years between 2022 and 2024. In 1998, Irish defender Brian Carey became the first player from outside the United Kingdom and the British Isles to win the award; and in 2004, Trinidad and Tobago defender Dennis Lawrence became the first, and, as of the 2024 award, only winner from outside of Europe.

== Winners ==
Season	Level (Note: The official level of competition in the structure of the English football league system.)	Player	Nationality	Position (Note: For a detailed description of playing positions, see association football positions.)	Apps	Goals	Caps	Notes
1975–76	Div 3	Brian Lloyd	Wales	Goalkeeper	333	0	3^{†}	(Note: The inaugural winner of the award.)
1976–77	Div 3	Graham Whittle	England	Forward	396	118	0	(Note: The first outfield player to win the award.)
1977–78	Div 3	Gareth Davies	Wales	Defender	612	21	3^{†}	—
1978–79	Div 2^{¤}	John Roberts	Wales	Defender	193	5	22^{†}	—
1979–80	Div 2	Dixie McNeil	England	Forward	222	88	0	(Note: Went on to manage the club from 1985 to 1989.)
1980–81	Div 2	Steve Fox	England	Midfielder	181	19	0	—
1981–82	Div 2	Eddie Niedzwiecki	Wales	Goalkeeper	143	0	2^{†}	—
1982–83	Div 3^{¤}	Robbie Savage	England	Midfielder	34	13	0	—
1983–84	Div 4^{¤}	David Gregory	England	Forward	195	45	0	—
1984–85	Div 4	Jack Keay	Scotland	Defender	199	11	0	—
1985–86	Div 4	Mike Williams	Wales	Defender	238	5	0	—
1986–87	Div 4	Mike Williams (2)	Wales	Defender	238	5	0	(Note: Won the award for a second time.) (Note: The first player to win the award twice, and in consecutive seasons.)
1987–88	Div 4	Kevin Russell	England	Forward	373	80	0	(Note: Received six caps for the England under-18 team.)
1988–89	Div 4	Kevin Russell (2)	England	Forward	373	80	0	
1989–90	Div 4	Nigel Beaumont	England	Defender	155	4	0	—
1990–91	Div 4	Mark Morris	England	Goalkeeper	138	0	0	—
1991–92	Div 4	Andy Thackeray	England	Defender	200	18	0	—
1992–93	Div 4	Tony Humes	England	Defender	255	10	0	—
1993–94	Div 3^{¤}	Gary Bennett	England	Forward	176	114	0	—
1994–95	Div 3	Gary Bennett (2)	England	Forward	176	114	0	
1995–96	Div 3	Waynne Phillips	Wales	Midfielder	321	23	0	—
1996–97	Div 3	Andy Marriott	Wales	Goalkeeper	269	0	5^{†}	—
1997–98	Div 3	Brian Carey	Republic of Ireland	Defender	391	20	3^{†}	(Note: The first non-British player to win the award.) (Note: Went on to manage the club in 2007 and 2008.)
1998–99	Div 3	Dean Spink	England	Forward/defender	125	12	0	—
1999–2000	Div 3	Darren Ferguson	Scotland	Midfielder	356	34	0	(Note: Received five caps for the Scotland under-21 team.)
2000–01	Div 3	Mark McGregor	England	Defender	318	14	0	—
2001–02	Div 3	Jim Whitley	Northern Ireland	Midfielder	162	2	3^{†}	—
2002–03	Div 4^{¤}	Andy Morrell	England	Forward	269	96	0	(Note: Went on to manage the club from 2011 to 2014.)
2003–04	Div 3^{¤}	Dennis Lawrence	Trinidad and Tobago	Defender	229	19	89^{†}	(Note: The first non-European winner of the award.)
2004–05	Div 3	Andy Holt	England	Defender	98	10	0	—
2005–06	Div 4^{¤}	Danny Williams	Wales	Midfielder	198	13	0	(Note: Received nine caps for the Wales under-21 team.)
2006–07	Div 4	Steve Evans	Wales	Defender	93	7	7^{†}	—
2007–08	Div 4	Neil Roberts	Wales	Forward	166	40	4^{†}	—
2008–09	Div 5^{¤}	Marc Williams	Wales	Forward	100	21	0	(Note: Received three caps for the Wales semi-professional team.)
2009–10	Div 5	Andrew Fleming	England	Midfielder	76	1	0	(Note: Received two caps for the England C team.)
2010–11	Div 5	Jay Harris	England	Midfielder	256	20	0	—
2011–12	Div 5	Neil Ashton	England	Defender	244	16	0	—
2012–13	Div 5	Danny Wright	England	Forward	86	25	0	—
2013–14	Div 5	Mark Carrington	England	Midfielder	274	6	0	—
2014–15	Div 5	Manny Smith	England	Defender	161	7	0	—
2015–16	Div 5	Connor Jennings	England	Forward	102	23	0	(Note: Received one cap for the England C team.)
2016–17	Div 5	Martin Riley	England	Defender	76	0	0	(Note: Received one cap for the England C team.)
2017–18	Div 5	Shaun Pearson	England	Defender	141	12	0	—
2018–19	Div 5	Rob Lainton	England	Goalkeeper	143	0	0	—
2019–20	Div 5	Luke Young	England	Midfielder	259	22	0	—
2020–21	Div 5	Luke Young (2)	England	Midfielder	259	22	0	
2021–22	Div 5	Paul Mullin	Wales	Forward	172	110	0	—
2022–23	Div 5	Paul Mullin (2)	Wales	Forward	172	110	0	
2023–24	Div 4^{¤}	Paul Mullin (3)	Wales	Forward	172	110	0	(Note: The first player to win the award three times, and in three consecutive seasons.)
2024–25	Div 3	Oliver Rathbone	England	Midfielder	78	16	0	—
2025–26	Div 2	Josh Windass	England	Forward	46	17	0	—

=== Multiple wins ===
Players with multiple wins
Rank	Winner	Total wins	Years won
1	Paul Mullin (WAL)	3	2022, 2023, 2024
2	Mike Williams (WAL)	2	1986, 1987
2	Kevin Russell (ENG)	2	1988, 1989
2	Gary Bennett (ENG)	2	1994, 1995
2	Luke Young (ENG)	2	2020, 2021

=== Wins by nationality ===
Wins by nationality
Nationality	Wins
England	33
Wales	13
Scotland	2
Republic of Ireland	1
Northern Ireland	1
Trinidad and Tobago	1

=== Wins by position ===
Wins by position
Position	Wins
Goalkeeper	5
Defender	18 (Note: Includes one win credited to a forward/defender.)
Midfielder	12
Forward	17

== See also ==
- List of Wrexham A.F.C. players
- List of Wrexham A.F.C. players (25–99 appearances)
- List of Wrexham A.F.C. players (1–24 appearances)
