= Oliver Rathbone =

English footballer (born 1996)

Personal information
- Full name: Oliver Michael Rathbone
- Date of birth: 10 October 1996 (age 30)
- Place of birth: Blackburn, England
- Height: 5 ft 7 in (1.70 m)
- Position: Central midfielder

Team information
- Current team: Wrexham
- Number: 20

Youth career
- 2008–2016: Manchester United

Senior career*
| Years | Team | Apps | (Gls) |
| 2016–2021 | Rochdale | 152 | (12) |
| 2021–2024 | Rotherham United | 122 | (7) |
| 2024– | Wrexham | 79 | (17) |
- * Club domestic league appearances and goals as of 00:36, 5 November 2026 (UTC)

Oliver Michael Rathbone (born 10 October 1996) is an English professional footballer who plays as a central midfielder for EFL Championship club Wrexham.

== Career ==
=== Early career ===
Rathbone started in the youth ranks of Manchester United. On 21 February 2015, Rathbone scored a 40-yard winner in an U18s game against Derby County. The goal won Manchester United's Goal of the Month award. After failing to make the breakthrough at Manchester United, Rathbone was released in June 2016.

=== Rochdale ===
On 24 June, Rathbone agreed to join EFL League One side Rochdale, signing a one-year contract. He made his competitive debut on 4 October in the EFL Trophy against Notts County. Days later, Rathbone made his first league appearance in a win over Southend United. Rathbone netted his first goal over Walsall in November.

After two goals in thirty-three appearances in his debut season, Rathbone signed a new contract with the club until June 2019 on 18 August 2017. His 100th match for Rochdale arrived on 9 March 2019 during a victory versus Shrewsbury Town. He was offered a new contract by Rochdale at the end of the 2018–19 season. On 24 June, Rathbone signed a new three-year deal to keep him under contract until the summer of 2022.

=== Rotherham United ===
On 4 August 2021, Rathbone signed a three-year contract with Rotherham United for an undisclosed fee. He made his debut in the first game of the 2021–22 season against Plymouth Argyle on 7 August 2021, coming on as a second-half substitute. He scored his first goal for the club on 25 September 2021, against Crewe. He left the club to sign for Wrexham on 9 August 2024.

=== Wrexham ===
On 9 August 2024, Rathbone signed for Wrexham on a three-year deal lasting until 2027. On 23 November 2024, he scored his first goal for the club in a 3–0 home victory over Exeter City.

== Personal life ==
He is the son of former footballer Mick Rathbone.

== Career statistics ==
As of match played 4 November 2026

Appearances and goals by club, season and competition
| Club | Season | League | | | FA Cup | | League Cup | | Other | | Total | |
| Club | Season | Division | Apps | Goals | Apps | Goals | Apps | Goals | Apps | Goals | Apps | Goals |
|---|---|---|---|---|---|---|---|---|---|---|---|---|
| Rochdale | 2016–17 | League One | 27 | 2 | 4 | 0 | 0 | 0 | 2 (Note: Appearance(s) in the EFL Trophy) | 0 | 33 | 2 |
| Rochdale | 2017–18 | League One | 33 | 1 | 4 | 0 | 1 | 0 | 4 | 0 | 42 | 1 |
| Rochdale | 2018–19 | League One | 28 | 4 | 0 | 0 | 1 | 2 | 3 | 0 | 32 | 6 |
| Rochdale | 2019–20 | League One | 24 | 2 | 2 | 0 | 3 | 1 | 1 | 0 | 30 | 3 |
| Rochdale | 2020–21 | League One | 40 | 3 | 1 | 0 | 2 | 0 | 3 | 0 | 46 | 3 |
| Rochdale | Total | | 152 | 12 | 11 | 0 | 7 | 3 | 13 | 0 | 183 | 15 |
| Rotherham United | 2021–22 | League One | 42 | 2 | 3 | 0 | 1 | 0 | 6 | 0 | 52 | 2 |
| Rotherham United | 2022–23 | Championship | 38 | 4 | 1 | 0 | 2 | 1 | — | | 41 | 5 |
| Rotherham United | 2023–24 | Championship | 42 | 1 | 1 | 0 | 2 | 0 | — | | 45 | 1 |
| Rotherham United | Total | | 122 | 7 | 5 | 0 | 5 | 1 | 6 | 0 | 138 | 8 |
| Wrexham | 2024–25 | League One | 41 | 8 | 1 | 0 | 1 | 0 | 5 | 0 | 48 | 8 |
| Wrexham | 2025–26 | Championship | 26 | 7 | 3 | 1 | 1 | 0 | — | | 30 | 8 |
| Wrexham | 2026–27 | Championship | 12 | 2 | 0 | 0 | 1 | 0 | 0 | 0 | 13 | 2 |
| Wrexham | Total | | 79 | 17 | 4 | 1 | 3 | 0 | 5 | 0 | 91 | 18 |
| Career total | | | 353 | 35 | 20 | 1 | 15 | 4 | 24 | 0 | 412 | 41 |

== Honours ==
Rotherham United

- EFL League One runner-up: 2021–22
- EFL Trophy: 2021–22

Wrexham

- EFL League One runner up: 2024–25

Individual

- Wrexham Player of the Season: 2024–25
