= Josh Windass =

English footballer (born 1994)

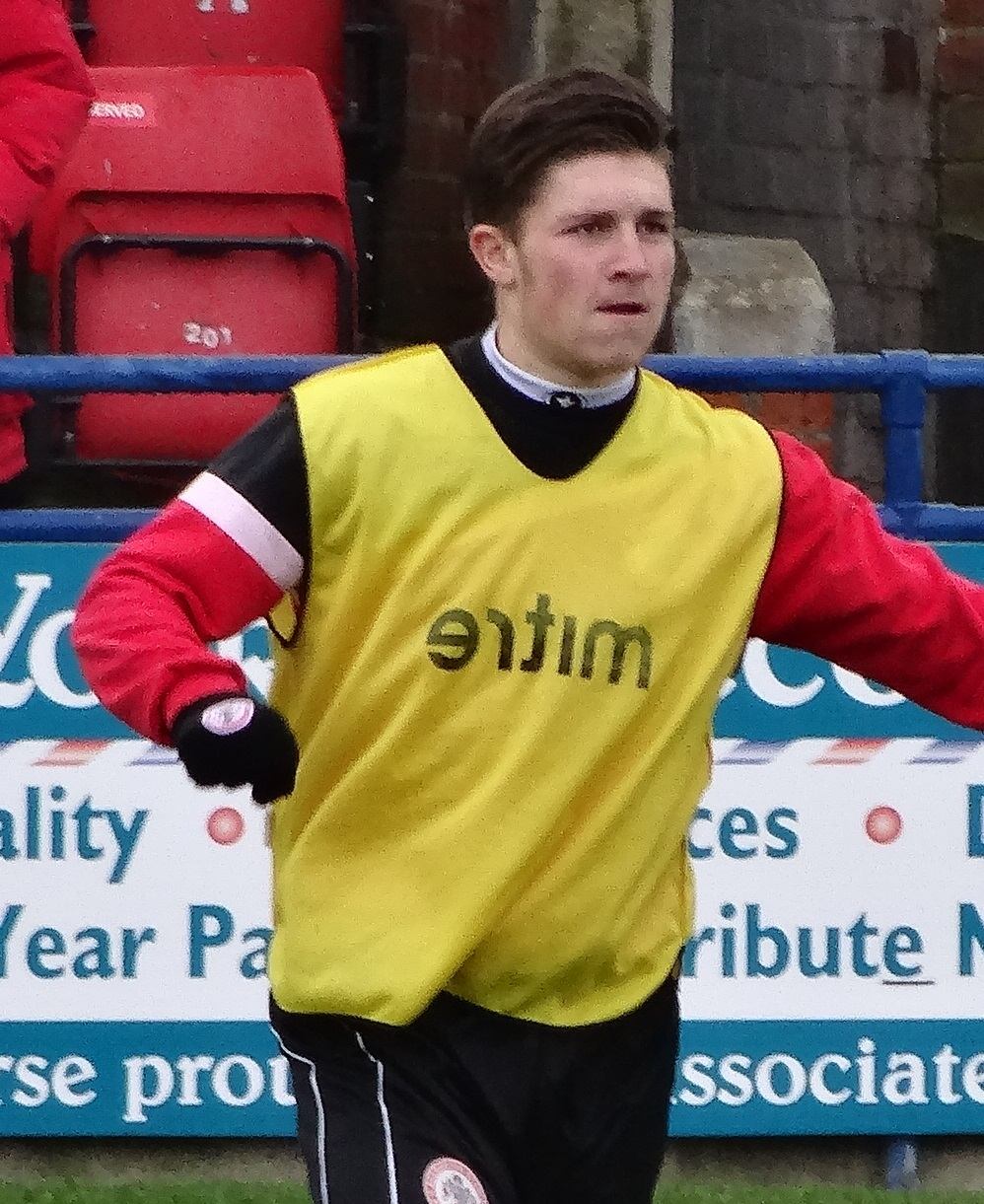
- Windass training with Accrington Stanley in 2014

Personal information
- Full name: Joshua Dean Windass
- Date of birth: 9 January 1994 (age 32)
- Place of birth: Hull, England
- Height: 1.76 m (5 ft 9 in)
- Positions: Attacking midfielder; forward

Team information
- Current team: Wrexham
- Number: 10

Youth career
- 2002–2012: Huddersfield Town

Senior career*
Years	Team	Apps	(Gls)
2012–2013	Harrogate Railway Athletic		
2013–2016	Accrington Stanley	75	(22)
2016–2018	Rangers	55	(13)
2018–2020	Wigan Athletic	54	(9)
2020	→ Sheffield Wednesday (loan)	9	(3)
2020–2025	Sheffield Wednesday	153	(43)
2025–	Wrexham	47	(16)
- * Club domestic league appearances and goals as of 12:18, 11 October 2026 (UTC)

Joshua Dean Windass (born 9 January 1994) is an English professional footballer who plays as an attacking midfielder and forward for EFL Championship club Wrexham.

After playing youth football for Huddersfield Town, Windass began his senior career in non-league football with Harrogate Railway Athletic. He later played for Accrington Stanley, Rangers, and Wigan Athletic. After initially signing for Sheffield Wednesday on loan, the transfer was later made permanent.

== Career ==
=== Early career ===
Windass played youth football for Huddersfield Town, spending ten years with the club. He was released in April 2012 and trialled with Bradford City that same month. Windass began his senior career with non-league team Harrogate Railway Athletic in December 2012. He played on a semi-professional basis, combining his football career with a job as a construction labourer.

=== Accrington Stanley ===
He signed a professional contract with Accrington Stanley in July 2013. He made his professional debut on 9 November 2013, in the FA Cup. In November 2015 he turned down a new contract from the club on the advice of his father. In January 2016 Accrington announced that Scottish club Rangers had approached Windass and teammate Matt Crooks directly, due to them being in the final six months of their contracts. The duo agreed pre-contracts with Rangers later that month, ahead of the 2016–17 season.

=== Rangers ===
Windass joined Rangers on 1 July 2016, signing a four-year contract alongside fellow Accrington player Matt Crooks. Both players had already been training with the club before completing their transfers after Rangers agreed a compensation fee with Accrington, reported to be around £60,000 per player. Windass made his debut for Rangers in a pre-season friendly against American side Charleston Battery on 7 July 2016, scoring the opening goal in a 2–1 win. His official debut was against Motherwell in the Scottish League Cup on 16 July and Windass netted his first goal for the club against Lowland Football League side East Stirlingshire six days later. Windass spent periods of the first half of the 2016–17 season on the sidelines due to a recurring hamstring injury in early August and October. Despite this, Windass was linked with a return to England in December 2016, with EFL Championship sides Derby County and Newcastle United reportedly showing an interest in the midfielder.

During the 2017–18 season, Windass finished the season with 18 goals in all competitions, tied (with Alfredo Morelos) as the club's top scorer for the season; with 13 of Windass' strikes in the league, the third-highest total behind Kris Boyd and Morelos.

=== Wigan Athletic ===
He signed for Wigan Athletic on 9 August 2018.

=== Sheffield Wednesday ===
Windass joined Sheffield Wednesday on loan for the remainder of the 2019–20 season on 31 January 2020. Due to disruption to the season caused by the COVID-19 pandemic, his loan spell was extended until the end of July.

On 2 September 2020, he made his move to Sheffield Wednesday a permanent signing for an undisclosed fee. His first appearance on his return to the club was on 5 September 2020, in the EFL Cup away to Walsall, where he came on as a second-half substitute. He would score his first goal as a permanent Wednesday player, on the opening day of the season in an away win against Cardiff City. He would win the clubs player of the month competition during his first month back at the club, after scoring 2 goals in 5 appearances. Following relegation to League One, Windass was heavily linked with moves back to the Championship, with the club rejecting offers in the region of £1 million for him.

During pre-season for the 2021–22 season, Windass suffered a hamstring injury during a friendly against West Bromwich Albion which would rule him out for two months and the start of the League One season. Despite being injured, he signed a new two-year deal at the club on 10 August 2021, which would see him remain at the club until the summer of 2023. Following his injury, he returned to the squad on 20 November as an unused substitute against Accrington Stanley and made his playing come back a few days later, coming off the bench to score an injury time winner against Milton Keynes Dons. Following the end of the 2021–22 season, there was again interest in him, with his former Rangers manager Pedro Caixinha linking him with a surprise move to Atlético Talleres reported.

He scored two braces, against Cambridge United in League One and Newcastle United in the FA Cup, resulting in him winning the club's player of the month for January 2023 and a nomination from the EFL for player of the month. His form for the 2022–23 season saw him and teammate Barry Bannan make the EFL League One team of the Season. He scored the only goal in the last minute of the League One play-off final against Barnsley to gain promotion to the Championship. Wednesday exercised an option in his contract for him to remain at the club for another season.

His goal against Blackburn Rovers, a looping chip from range that dropped under the crossbar won the April Championship Goal of the Month. Following the end of the 2023–24 season, the club offered Windass a new contract. He signed his new contract on 2 July 2024.

The following season, he won the club's player of the month award for December 2024, having scored four goals. In January 2025, he scored from his own half against Derby County which earned him the goal of the month award, and a nomination for goal of the season. His goal against Watford on the final day of the 2024–25 season made him Sheffield Wednesday's leading goal scorer in the 21st century with 53 goals, overtaking Marcus Tudgay's record. Following the end of the 2024–25 season, an option was taken to extend his current contract.

In July 2025, Windass left Sheffield Wednesday by mutual consent.

=== Wrexham ===
Windass signed with Wrexham on a free transfer in July 2025. He made his debut on the opening day of the season, scoring a penalty in a 2–1 defeat against recently relegated side Southampton. The following game against West Bromwich Albion, Windass would pull up with a suspected hamstring injury and would be replaced in the first half.

== Playing style ==
Primarily an attacking midfielder, Windass can also play as a forward. He's been noted to not celebrate the goals he scores; in his own words, "I just don't get that happy when I score. I prefer watching them back after.".

== Personal life ==
Windass was born in Hull, East Riding of Yorkshire, and is the son of former professional Dean Windass. He met his wife Danielle while touring in South Carolina.

== Career statistics ==
As of match played 10 October 2026

Appearances and goals by club, season and competition
Club	Season	League			National cup (Note: Includes FA Cup, Scottish Cup)		League cup (Note: Includes EFL Cup, Scottish League Cup)		Other		Total	
Club	Season	Division	Apps	Goals	Apps	Goals	Apps	Goals	Apps	Goals	Apps	Goals
Accrington Stanley	2013–14	League Two	10	0	1	0	0	0	–		11	0
Accrington Stanley	2014–15	League Two	35	6	3	0	1	0	1 (Note: Appearance(s) in EFL Trophy)	0	40	6
Accrington Stanley	2015–16	League Two	32	16	2	1	1	0	–		35	17
Accrington Stanley	Total		77	22	6	1	2	0	1	0	86	23
Rangers	2016–17	Scottish Premiership	21	0	2	0	4	1	–		27	1
Rangers	2017–18	Scottish Premiership	33	13	4	5	3	0	1 (Note: Appearance(s) in UEFA Europa League)	0	41	18
Rangers	2018–19	Scottish Premiership	1	0	0	0	0	0	4	0	5	0
Rangers	Total		55	13	6	5	7	1	5	0	73	19
Wigan Athletic	2018–19	Championship	39	5	1	0	0	0	–		40	5
Wigan Athletic	2019–20	Championship	15	4	1	0	0	0	–		16	4
Wigan Athletic	Total		54	9	2	0	0	0	–		56	9
Sheffield Wednesday (loan)	2019–20	Championship	9	3	0	0	0	0	–		9	3
Sheffield Wednesday	2020–21	Championship	41	9	1	0	2	1	–		44	10
Sheffield Wednesday	2021–22	League One	9	4	0	0	0	0	3 (Note: One appearance in the EFL Trophy, two appearances in League One play-offs)	0	12	4
Sheffield Wednesday	2022–23	League One	34	11	4	3	1	1	3 (Note: Appearances in League One play-offs)	1	42	16
Sheffield Wednesday	2023–24	Championship	25	6	1	1	2	0	–		28	7
Sheffield Wednesday	2024–25	Championship	44	13	1	0	2	0	–		47	13
Sheffield Wednesday	Total		153	43	7	4	7	2	5	1	173	50
Wrexham	2025–26	Championship	41	16	3	1	2	0	–		46	17
Wrexham	2026–27	Championship	6	0	0	0	0	0	0	0	6	0
Wrexham	Total		47	16	3	1	2	0	0	0	52	17
Career total			395	106	24	11	18	3	11	1	449	121

== Honours ==
Sheffield Wednesday

- EFL League One play-offs: 2023

Individual

- EFL League One Team of the Season: 2022–23
- Wrexham Player of the Season: 2025–26
