= Jacques Ekomié =

Gabonese footballer (born 2003)

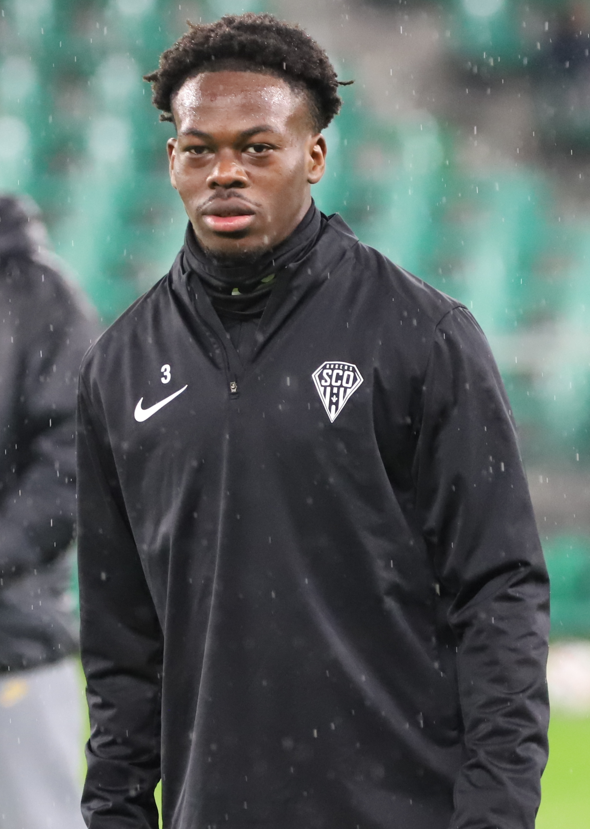
- Ekomié with Angers in 2025

Personal information
- Full name: Jacques Emmanuel Paul Ekomié
- Date of birth: 19 August 2003 (age 23)
- Place of birth: Downhill, Gabon
- Height: 1.79 m (5 ft 10 in)
- Position: Defender

Team information
- Current team: Wrexham
- Number: 3

Youth career
- –2021: Mérignac
- 2021–2022: Bordeaux

Senior career*
Years	Team	Apps	(Gls)
2021–2023	Bordeaux B	36	(1)
2023–2024	Bordeaux	30	(0)
2024–2026	Angers	51	(0)
2026–	Wrexham	7	(2)

International career^{‡}
2023–	Gabon	24	(0)
- * Club domestic league appearances and goals as of 17:06, 19 September 2026 (UTC) ‡ National team caps and goals as of 21:15, 29 September 2026 (UTC)

Jacques Emmanuel Paul Ekomié (born 19 August 2003) is a Gabonese professional footballer who plays as a defender for EFL Championship club Wrexham and the Gabon national team.

== Career ==
Ekomié joined Bordeaux from Mérignac in January 2021. He made his professional debut for the club in a 3–0 Coupe de France loss to Brest on 2 January 2022.

On 31 July 2024, Ekomié joined Ligue 1 club Angers on a three-year contract.

On 27 August 2026 Ekomié joined EFL Championship club Wrexham.

== International career ==
Ekomié debuted for the Gabon national team in a 1–0 2023 Africa Cup of Nations qualification win over Sudan on 23 March 2023.

== Personal life ==
Jacques's father Jean-Jacques is a professor.

== Career statistics ==
=== Club ===
As of match played 19 September 2026

Appearances and goals by club, season and competition
Club	Season	League			National cup (Note: Includes Coupe de France)		Europe		Other		Total	
Club	Season	Division	Apps	Goals	Apps	Goals	Apps	Goals	Apps	Goals	Apps	Goals
Bordeaux B	2021–22	CFA 2	23	0	—		—		—		23	0
Bordeaux B	2022–23	CFA 2	10	1	—		—		—		10	1
Bordeaux B	2023–24	CFA 2	3	0	—		—		—		3	0
Bordeaux B	Total		36	1	—		—		—		36	1
Bordeaux	2021–22	Ligue 1	0	0	1	0	—		—		1	0
Bordeaux	2022–23	Ligue 2	7	0	2	0	—		—		9	0
Bordeaux	2023–24	Ligue 2	23	0	2	0	—		—		25	0
Bordeaux	Total		30	0	5	0	—		—		35	0
Angers	2024–25	Ligue 1	18	0	3	0	—		—		21	0
Angers	2025–26	Ligue 1	32	0	1	0	—		—		33	0
Angers	2026–27	Ligue 1	1	0	—		—		—		1	0
Angers	Total		51	0	4	0	—		—		55	0
Wrexham	2026–27	EFL Championship	7	2	0	0	—		—		7	2
Career total			124	4	9	0	0	0	0	0	133	3

=== International ===
As of match played 29 September 2026

Appearances and goals by national team and year
National team	Year	Apps	Goals
Gabon	2023	5	0
Gabon	2024	7	0
Gabon	2025	10	0
Gabon	2026	2	0
Total		24	0
