= Lucas Pires =

Lucas Pires may refer to:

- Francisco Lucas Pires, Portuguese teacher, lawyer, and politician
- Lucas Pires (footballer), Brazilian footballer
