= 2025–26 Wrexham A.F.C. season =

Welsh football club season

Wrexham A.F.C.
2025–26 season
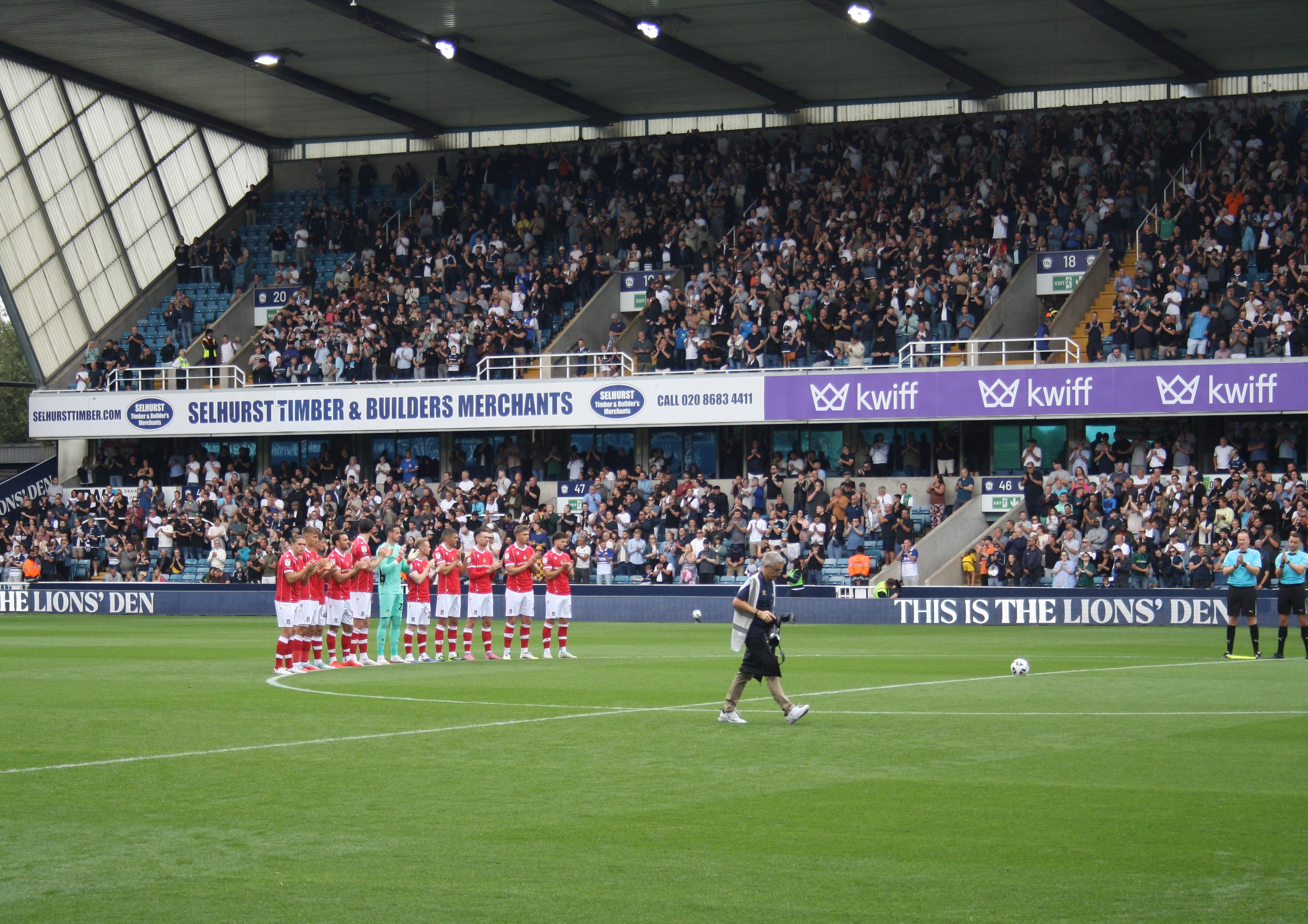
- Wrexham players prior to the match against Millwall on 30 August 2025
- Owner: Wrexham Holdings LLC (Ryan Reynolds and Rob McElhenney)
- Manager: Phil Parkinson
- Stadium: STōK Cae Ras
- Championship: 7th
- FA Cup: Fifth round
- EFL Cup: Fourth round
- Top goalscorer: League: Josh Windass (16); All: Josh Windass (17)
- Highest home attendance: 10,716 (2 May 2026 vs Middlesbrough)
- Lowest home attendance: 9,457 (23 September 2025 vs Reading)
- Average home league attendance: 10,645
- Biggest win: 2–0 (in three matches); 5–3 (in two matches)
- Biggest defeat: 1–5 (7 April 2026 vs Southampton)
| Home colours | Away colours | Third colours |

The 2025–26 season was the 161st season in the history of Wrexham Association Football Club, and the club's first season back in the Championship, the second tier of English football, since 1981–82, following successive promotions from the National League three years earlier, League Two two seasons earlier, and from League One in the preceding season.

Wrexham finished 7th in the league, the highest finish in the club's history, but narrowly missed out on the promotion play-offs. The Red Dragons advanced to the fifth round of the FA Cup and bowed out in the fourth round of the EFL Cup.

The season was chronicled in the fifth season of the documentary series Welcome to Wrexham.

== First-team squad ==
As of 30 June 2026

| No. | Player | Nat. | Pos. | Date of birth (age) | Previous club | Signed on | Contract ends | Apps. | Goals |
Goalkeepers
| 1 | Arthur Okonkwo | (Nigeria) | GK | 9 September 2001 (aged 24) | Arsenal | 1 September 2023 | 30 June 2027 | 121 | 0 |
| 21 | Danny Ward | (Wales) | GK | 22 June 1993 (aged 33) | Leicester City | 1 July 2025 | 30 June 2027 | 9 | 0 |
| 25 | Callum Burton | (England) | GK | 15 August 1996 (aged 29) | Plymouth Argyle | 15 July 2024 | 30 June 2027 | 10 | 0 |
| 31 | Reuben Egan | (Republic of Ireland) | GK | 27 July 2005 (aged 20) | Tranmere Rovers | 3 September 2025 | 30 June 2026 | 0 | 0 |
Defenders
| 2 | Callum Doyle | (England) | DF | 3 October 2003 (aged 22) | Manchester City | 21 August 2025 | 30 June 2029 | 39 | 3 |
| 3 | Lewis Brunt | (England) | CB | 6 November 2000 (aged 25) | Leicester City | 2 July 2024 | 30 June 2027 | 41 | 1 |
| 4 | Max Cleworth | (England) | CB | 9 August 2002 (aged 23) | Academy | 1 February 2021 | 30 June 2029 | 192 | 13 |
| 5 | Dominic Hyam | (Scotland) | CB | 20 December 1995 (aged 30) | Blackburn Rovers | 1 September 2025 | 30 June 2027 | 43 | 1 |
| 12 | Issa Kaboré | (Burkina Faso) | RWB | 12 May 2001 (aged 25) | Manchester City | 1 September 2025 | 31 May 2026 | 32 | 0 |
| 13 | Liberato Cacace | New Zealand | LB | 27 September 2000 (aged 25) | Empoli | 18 July 2025 | 30 June 2028 | 11 | 1 |
| 24 | Dan Scarr | (England) | DF | 24 December 1994 (aged 31) | Plymouth Argyle | 2 August 2024 | 30 June 2027 | 44 | 0 |
| 29 | Ryan Barnett | (England) | RWB | 23 September 1999 (aged 26) | Solihull Moors | 24 February 2023 | 30 June 2027 | 112 | 4 |
| 34 | Aaron James | (England) | CB | 30 June 2005 (aged 21) | Academy | 1 July 2023 | 30 June 2026 | 9 | 1 |
| 26 | Zak Vyner | (Kenya) | CB | 14 May 1997 (aged 29) | Bristol City | 1 February 2026 | 30 June 2029 | 9 | 0 |
Midfielders
| 10 | Josh Windass | (England) | AM | 9 January 1994 (aged 32) | Sheffield Wednesday | 23 July 2025 | 30 June 2028 | 46 | 17 |
| 14 | George Thomason | (England) | MF | 12 January 2001 (aged 25) | Bolton Wanderers | 21 July 2025 | 30 June 2028 | 39 | 1 |
| 15 | George Dobson | (England) | MF | 15 November 1997 (aged 28) | Charlton Athletic | 6 July 2024 | 30 June 2028 | 94 | 4 |
| 18 | Ben Sheaf | (England) | DM | 5 February 1998 (aged 28) | Coventry City | 1 September 2025 | 30 June 2028 | 30 | 0 |
| 20 | Oliver Rathbone | (England) | CM | 10 October 1996 (aged 29) | Rotherham United | 9 August 2024 | 30 June 2028 | 78 | 16 |
| 22 | Thomas O'Connor | (Republic of Ireland) | DM | 21 April 1999 (aged 27) | Burton Albion | 31 January 2022 | 30 June 2027 | 115 | 8 |
| 27 | Lewis O'Brien | (England) | CM | 14 October 1998 (aged 27) | Nottingham Forest | 24 July 2025 | 30 June 2028 | 45 | 4 |
| 37 | Matty James | (England) | CM | 22 July 1991 (aged 34) | Bristol City | 25 October 2024 | 30 June 2027 | 72 | 3 |
| 47 | Ryan Longman | (England) | MF | 6 November 2000 (aged 25) | Hull City | 24 January 2025 | 30 June 2027 | 61 | 3 |
Forwards
| 7 | Davis Keillor-Dunn | (England) | FW | 2 November 1997 (aged 28) | Barnsley | 2 February 2026 | 30 June 2029 | 13 | 1 |
| 16 | Jay Rodriguez | (England) | FW | 29 July 1989 (aged 36) | Burnley | 31 January 2025 | 30 June 2026 | 26 | 2 |
| 19 | Kieffer Moore | (Wales) | FW | 8 August 1992 (aged 33) | Sheffield United | 5 August 2025 | 30 June 2028 | 43 | 13 |
| 28 | Sam Smith | (England) | FW | 8 March 1998 (aged 28) | Reading | 31 January 2025 | 30 June 2028 | 66 | 17 |
| 33 | Nathan Broadhead | (Wales) | FW | 5 April 1998 (aged 28) | Ipswich Town | 14 August 2025 | 30 June 2029 | 41 | 8 |
| 11 | Bailey Cadamarteri | (Jamaica) | FW | 9 May 2005 (aged 21) | Sheffield Wednesday | 2 February 2026 | 30 June 2029 | 3 | 0 |
Out on Loan
| – | Harry Ashfield | (Wales) | RM | 23 March 2006 (aged 20) | Academy | 1 July 2022 | 30 June 2027 | 9 | 2 |
| – | Andy Cannon | (England) | CM | 14 March 1996 (aged 30) | Hull City | 9 December 2022 | 30 June 2026 | 88 | 12 |
| – | Conor Coady | (England) | CB | 25 February 1993 (aged 33) | Leicester City | 1 August 2025 | 30 June 2027 | 6 | 0 |
| – | Callum Edwards | (England) | FW | 22 June 2006 (aged 20) | Academy | 1 July 2021 | 30 June 2026 | 0 | 0 |
| – | Modou Faal | (The Gambia) | FW | 11 February 2003 (aged 23) | West Bromwich Albion | 30 August 2024 | 30 June 2027 | 16 | 3 |
| – | Ryan Hardie | (Scotland) | FW | 17 March 1997 (aged 29) | Plymouth Argyle | 16 June 2025 | 30 June 2028 | 10 | 1 |
| – | Tom Kelly | (Wales) | DF | 2 March 2007 (aged 19) | Academy | 1 July 2025 | 30 June 2026 | 0 | 0 |
| – | Elliot Lee | (England) | AM | 16 December 1994 (aged 31) | Luton Town | 8 July 2022 | 30 June 2027 | 153 | 41 |
| – | Alex Moore | (England) | MF | 18 September 2006 (aged 19) | Academy | 1 July 2025 | 30 June 2026 | 0 | 0 |
| – | Paul Mullin | (England) | FW | 6 November 1994 (aged 31) | Cambridge United | 23 July 2021 | 30 June 2027 | 172 | 110 |
| – | Rio Owen | (Wales) | FW | 20 September 2006 (aged 19) | Academy | 1 July 2025 | 30 June 2026 | 0 | 0 |
| – | Max Purvis | (England) | DF | 8 June 2007 (aged 19) | Academy | 1 July 2025 | 30 June 2026 | 0 | 0 |
| – | Sebastian Revan | (England) | MF | 14 July 2003 (aged 22) | Aston Villa | 15 July 2024 | 30 June 2027 | 27 | 1 |

== Transfers and contracts ==
=== In ===
| Date | Pos. | Nat. | Name | From | Fee | Ref. |
|---|---|---|---|---|---|---|
| 16 June 2025 | CF | (Scotland) | Ryan Hardie | (England) Plymouth Argyle | £700,000 | |
| 1 July 2025 | GK | (Wales) | Danny Ward | (England) Leicester City | Free | |
| 18 July 2025 | LB | New Zealand | Liberato Cacace | Empoli | £2,177,000 | |
| 21 July 2025 | CM | (England) | George Thomason | (England) Bolton Wanderers | £1,200,000 | |
| 23 July 2025 | AM | (England) | Josh Windass | (England) Sheffield Wednesday | Free | |
| 24 July 2025 | CM | (England) | Lewis O'Brien | (England) Nottingham Forest | £5,000,000 | |
| 1 August 2025 | CB | (England) | Conor Coady | (England) Leicester City | £2,000,000 | |
| 5 August 2025 | FW | (Wales) | Kieffer Moore | (England) Sheffield United | £2,000,000 | |
| 14 August 2025 | FW | (Wales) | Nathan Broadhead | (England) Ipswich Town | £10,000,000 | |
| 21 August 2025 | CB | (England) | Callum Doyle | (England) Manchester City | £7,500,000 | |
| 1 September 2025 | CDM | (England) | Ben Sheaf | (England) Coventry City | £6,500,000 | |
| 1 September 2025 | CB | (Scotland) | Dominic Hyam | (England) Blackburn Rovers | £2,700,000 | |
| 3 September 2025 | GK | (Republic of Ireland) | Reuben Egan | (England) Tranmere Rovers | Free | |
| 1 February 2026 | CB | (Kenya) | Zak Vyner | (England) Bristol City | £1,500,000 | |
| 2 February 2026 | FW | (England) | Davis Keillor-Dunn | (England) Barnsley | £2,000,000 | |
| 2 February 2026 | FW | (Jamaica) | Bailey Cadamarteri | (England) Sheffield Wednesday | £1,000,000 | |

Expenditure: ▼£44,277,000

=== Out ===
| Date | Pos. | Nat. | Name | To | Fee | Ref. |
|---|---|---|---|---|---|---|
| 26 June 2025 | CB | (England) | Will Boyle | (England) Shrewsbury Town | – | |
| 3 July 2025 | GK | (Republic of Ireland) | Luke McNicholas | (England) Forest Green Rovers | Undisclosed | |
| 19 July 2025 | RB | (England) | Luke Bolton | (England) Mansfield Town | Undisclosed | |
| 26 August 2025 | FW | (England) | Jack Marriott | (England) Reading | Undisclosed | |
| 8 January 2026 | CF | (Wales) | Jake Bickerstaff | (England) Cheltenham Town | – | |
| 2 February 2026 | LWB | (The Gambia) | Jacob Mendy | (England) Peterborough United | – | |

=== Loaned in ===
| Date | Pos. | Nat. | Name | From | Date until | Ref. |
|---|---|---|---|---|---|---|
| 1 September 2025 | RWB | (Burkina Faso) | Issa Kaboré | (England) Manchester City | 31 May 2026 | |

=== Loaned out ===
| Date | Pos. | Nat. | Name | To | Date until | Ref. |
|---|---|---|---|---|---|---|
| 23 June 2025 | CF | (England) | Paul Mullin | (England) Wigan Athletic | 5 January 2026 (Note: On 5 January, Wigan chose to activate the break clause in Mullin's loan contract) | |
| 1 August 2025 | CF | (Wales) | Jake Bickerstaff | (England) Cheltenham Town | 8 January 2026 (Note: On 8 January, Cheltenham completed a permanent transfer of Bickerstaff) | |
| 7 August 2025 | CF | (The Gambia) | Modou Faal | (England) Port Vale | 23 January 2026 (Note: On 23 January, Port Vale chose to terminate the loan agreement) | |
| 13 August 2025 | LB | (England) | Sebastian Revan | (England) Burton Albion | 31 May 2026 | |
| 16 August 2025 | RW | (England) | Callum Edwards | (England) Southport | 1 January 2026 | |
| 1 September 2025 | CB | (Republic of Ireland) | Thomas O'Connor | (England) Peterborough United | 2 February 2026 (Note: On 2 February, Peterborough United chose to terminate the loan contract due to injury) | |
| 1 September 2025 | LWB | (The Gambia) | Jacob Mendy | (England) Peterborough United | 2 February 2026 (Note: On 2 February, Peterborough United completed a permanent transfer of Mendy) | |
| 9 January 2026 | MF | (England) | Alex Moore | (Wales) Colwyn Bay | 31 May 2026 | |
| 9 January 2026 | FW | (Wales) | Rio Owen | (Wales) Caernarfon Town | 31 May 2026 | |
| 9 January 2026 | DF | (Wales) | Tom Kelly | (England) Bootle | 23 January 2026 (Note: On 23 January, Kelly was recalled from his loan at Bootle and subsequently joined Bala Town on loan) | |
| 10 January 2026 | DF | (England) | Max Purvis | (Wales) Flint Town | 31 May 2026 | |
| 23 January 2026 | DF | (England) | Tom Kelly | (Wales) Bala Town | 31 May 2026 | |
| 26 January 2026 | CM | (England) | Andy Cannon | (England) Burton Albion | 31 May 2026 | |
| 29 January 2026 | DF | (England) | Conor Coady | (England) Charlton Athletic | 31 May 2026 | |
| 30 January 2026 | CF | (England) | Paul Mullin | (England) Bradford City | 31 May 2026 | |
| 2 February 2026 | AM | (England) | Elliot Lee | (England) Doncaster Rovers | 31 May 2026 | |
| 2 February 2026 | RM | (Wales) | Harry Ashfield | (England) Cheltenham Town | 31 May 2026 | |
| 2 February 2026 | FW | (Scotland) | Ryan Hardie | (England) Huddersfield Town | 31 May 2026 | |
| 2 February 2026 | CF | (The Gambia) | Modou Faal | (England) Cheltenham Town | 31 May 2026 | |

=== Released / Out of Contract ===
| Date | Pos. | Nat. | Name | Subsequent club | Join date | Ref. |
|---|---|---|---|---|---|---|
| 30 June 2025 | AM | (Scotland) | Josh Adam | (Czech Republic) Dynamo České Budějovice | 1 August 2025 | |
| 30 June 2025 | CF | (England) | Sam Dalby | (England) Bolton Wanderers | 1 July 2025 | |
| 30 June 2025 | CM | (Wales) | Jordan Davies | (England) Fleetwood Town | 27 August 2025 | |
| 30 June 2025 | CB | (Wales) | Harry Dean | (Wales) Bala Town | 2 July 2025 | |
| 30 June 2025 | CF | (Scotland) | Steven Fletcher | Retired | | |
| 30 June 2025 | GK | (England) | Brad Foster | (Scotland) Ross County | 3 July 2025 | |
| 30 June 2025 | GK | (England) | Liam Hall | (England) Sheffield United | 3 October 2025 | |
| 30 June 2025 | GK | (England) | Mark Howard | (England) Salford City | 22 July 2025 | |
| 29 August 2025 | CF | (England) | Ollie Palmer | (England) Swindon Town | 29 August 2025 | |
| 1 September 2025 | DM | (England) | George Evans | (England) Burton Albion | 1 September 2025 | |
| 4 September 2025 | CB | (Republic of Ireland) | Eoghan O'Connell | (England) Barnsley | 6 January 2026 | |
| 17 January 2026 | LWB | (Republic of Ireland) | James McClean | (Republic of Ireland) Derry City | 17 January 2026 | |

=== New contracts ===
| Date | Pos. | Nat. | Name | Contract until | Ref. |
|---|---|---|---|---|---|
| 16 May 2025 | DF | (England) | Aaron James | 30 June 2026 | |
| 5 July 2025 | GK | (England) | Callum Burton | 30 June 2027 | |
| 8 August 2025 | DM | (Republic of Ireland) | James McClean | 30 June 2027 | |
| 16 January 2026 | DF | (England) | Max Cleworth | 30 June 2029 | |
| 19 January 2026 | CM | (England) | Matty James | 30 June 2027 | |
| 6 February 2026 | GK | (Republic of Ireland) | Reuben Egan | 30 June 2026 | |
| 23 February 2026 | MF | (England) | George Dobson | 30 June 2028 | |
| 23 February 2026 | CM | (England) | Oliver Rathbone | 30 June 2028 | |

== Pre-season and friendlies ==
On 12 May, Wrexham announced they would visit Australia and New Zealand as part of their pre-season preparations, with friendlies against Melbourne Victory, Sydney and Wellington Phoenix. On 7 July, Wrexham also announced that Ben Foster and Ben Tozer are set to appear at exclusive soccer camps on Wrexham Down Under Tour. On 21 July, a trip to Netherlands to face FC Groningen was confirmed.

Win Draw Loss Fixtures

| 11 July 2025 Friendly | Melbourne Victory | 0–3 | Wrexham | Melbourne, Australia |
| 19:30 AEST | | Report | O'Connor 43'; Hardie 66'; Evans 78' | Stadium: Docklands Stadium; Attendance: 37,020 |

| 15 July 2025 Friendly | Sydney FC | 2–1 | Wrexham | Sydney, Australia |
| 19:30 AEST | Popovic 45'; Lacey 74' | Report | Hollman 18' (o.g.) | Stadium: Sydney Football Stadium; Attendance: 40,242 |

| 19 July 2025 Friendly | Wellington Phoenix | 1–0 | Wrexham | Wellington, New Zealand |
| 17:00 NZST | Flowerdew 49' | Report | | Stadium: Wellington Regional Stadium; Attendance: 25,399 |

| 2 August 2025 Friendly | FC Groningen | 1–0 | Wrexham | Veendam, Netherlands |
| 15:00 CEST | Holder 88' | Report | | Stadium: De Langeleegte; Attendance: 0 (behind-closed-doors) |

| 2 August 2025 Friendly | FC Groningen | 3–1 | Wrexham | Veendam, Netherlands |
| 17:30 CEST | Van der Werff 18'; Willumsson (2) 38', 89' | Report | Windass 22' | Stadium: De Langeleegte; Attendance: 7,000 |

== Competitions ==
=== Overall record ===
| Competition | First match | Last match | Starting round | Final position | Record | | | | | | | |
| Competition | First match | Last match | Starting round | Final position | Pld | W | D | L | GF | GA | GD | Win % |
|---|---|---|---|---|---|---|---|---|---|---|---|---|
| Championship | 9 August 2025 | 2 May 2026 | Matchday 1 | 7th | 46 | 19 | 14 | 13 | 69 | 65 | +4 | 41.30 |
| FA Cup | 9 January 2026 | 7 March 2026 | Third round | Fifth round | 3 | 1 | 1 | 1 | 6 | 7 | −1 | 33.33 |
| EFL Cup | 12 August 2025 | 28 October 2025 | First round | Fourth round | 4 | 2 | 1 | 1 | 9 | 7 | +2 | 50.00 |
| Total | | | | | 53 | 22 | 16 | 15 | 84 | 79 | +5 | 41.51 |

Source: Soccerway

=== Championship ===
==== League table ====
| Pos | Team | Pld | W | D | L | GF | GA | GD | Pts | Promotion, qualification or relegation |
|---|---|---|---|---|---|---|---|---|---|---|
| 5 | Middlesbrough | 46 | 22 | 14 | 10 | 72 | 47 | +25 | 80 | Qualification for the Championship play-offs |
| 6 | Hull City (O, P) | 46 | 21 | 10 | 15 | 70 | 66 | +4 | 73 | Qualification for the Championship play-offs |
| 7 | Wrexham | 46 | 19 | 14 | 13 | 69 | 65 | +4 | 71 | |
| 8 | Derby County | 46 | 20 | 9 | 17 | 67 | 59 | +8 | 69 | |
| 9 | Norwich City | 46 | 19 | 8 | 19 | 63 | 56 | +7 | 65 | |

Source: EFL Official Website
Rules for classification: 1) Points; 2) Goal difference; 3) Number of goals scored; 4) Head-to-head results; 5) Wins; 6) Away goals; 7) Penalty points (sec 9.5); 8) Number of 12-point sending off offences; 9) Play-off (only if needed to determine promotion/relegation)
(O) Play-off winners; (P) Promoted

==== Results summary ====
| Overall | | | | | | | | Home | | | | | | Away | | | | | |
| Pld | W | D | L | GF | GA | GD | Pts | W | D | L | GF | GA | GD | W | D | L | GF | GA | GD |
|---|---|---|---|---|---|---|---|---|---|---|---|---|---|---|---|---|---|---|---|
| 46 | 19 | 14 | 13 | 69 | 65 | +4 | 71 | 10 | 7 | 6 | 41 | 38 | +3 | 9 | 7 | 7 | 28 | 27 | +1 |

Source: Soccerway

==== Results by round ====
| Round | 1 | 2 | 3 | 4 | 5 | 6 | 7 | 8 | 9 | 10 | 11 | 12 | 13 | 14 | 15 | 16 | 17 | 18 | 19 | 20 | 21 | 22 | 23 | 24 | 25 | 26 | 27 | 28 | 29 | 30 | 31 | 32 | 33 | 34 | 35 | 37 | 38 | 36^{1} | 39 | 40 | 41 | 42 | 43 | 44 | 45 | 46 |
|---|---|---|---|---|---|---|---|---|---|---|---|---|---|---|---|---|---|---|---|---|---|---|---|---|---|---|---|---|---|---|---|---|---|---|---|---|---|---|---|---|---|---|---|---|---|---|
| Ground | A | H | H | A | H | A | H | A | H | A | H | A | H | A | H | A | H | H | A | A | H | A | H | H | A | A | H | H | A | A | H | A | H | H | A | H | H | A | A | A | H | A | H | A | A | H |
| Result | L | L | D | W | L | W | D | D | D | L | W | D | W | D | W | D | W | D | D | L | D | L | W | W | W | W | L | D | W | W | L | D | W | W | W | L | W | L | W | D | L | L | W | W | L | D |
| Position | 17 | 19 | 19 | 15 | 21 | 16 | 15 | 15 | 18 | 18 | 15 | 16 | 15 | 14 | 13 | 14 | 10 | 10 | 12 | 14 | 15 | 15 | 13 | 11 | 10 | 9 | 10 | 9 | 6 | 6 | 6 | 7 | 6 | 6 | 6 | 6 | 6 | 7 | 7 | 6 | 7 | 7 | 7 | 6 | 6 | 7 |
| Points | 0 | 0 | 1 | 4 | 4 | 7 | 8 | 9 | 10 | 10 | 13 | 14 | 17 | 18 | 21 | 22 | 25 | 26 | 27 | 27 | 28 | 28 | 31 | 34 | 37 | 40 | 40 | 41 | 44 | 47 | 47 | 48 | 51 | 54 | 57 | 57 | 60 | 60 | 63 | 64 | 64 | 64 | 67 | 70 | 70 | 71 |

Source: EFL
A = Away; H = Home; W = Win; D = Draw; L = Loss
Notes:
- ^{1} Matchday 36 (vs. Watford) was postponed due to FA Cup progression.

==== Matches ====
The league fixtures were released on 26 June 2025.

Win Draw Loss Fixtures

| 9 August 2025 1 | Southampton | 2–1 | Wrexham | Southampton |
| 12:30 BST | Manning 90'; Stephens 90+6' (Downs); Archer (yellow card) 90+8' | Report | Windass 22' (pen.); Cleworth (yellow card) 25'; McClean (yellow card) 90+1' | Stadium: St Mary's Stadium; Attendance: 30,970; Referee: James Bell |

| 16 August 2025 2 | Wrexham | 2–3 | West Bromwich Albion | Wrexham |
| 12:30 BST | Brunt (yellow card) 27'; O'Brien 42' (McClean); Smith 90+5' (Longman), (yellow card) 90+5' | Report | Price 20', 81' (Johnston); Wallace 74' (Johnston) | Stadium: STōK Cae Ras; Attendance: 10,656; Referee: John Busby |
Note: Fixture was initially scheduled for a 15:00 kick-off, but was moved for live Sky Sports broadcast.

| 23 August 2025 3 | Wrexham | 2–2 | Sheffield Wednesday | Wrexham |
| 15:00 BST | Moore 15', 31' | Report | Bannan 63'; Cadamarteri 81' (McNeill) | Stadium: STōK Cae Ras; Attendance: 10,628; Referee: Farai Hallam |

| 30 August 2025 4 | Millwall | 0–2 | Wrexham | Bermondsey |
| 15:00 BST | Bangura-Williams (yellow card) 82' | Report | Moore 58' (Cleworth), (yellow card) 90+18'; Doyle (yellow card) 64'; O'Brien 90+18' (McClean), (yellow card) 90+20' | Stadium: The Den; Attendance: 17,877; Referee: Thomas Kirk |

| 13 September 2025 5 | Wrexham | 1–3 | Queens Park Rangers | Wrexham |
| 15:00 BST | Moore 67' (O'Brien); Dobson (yellow card) 82' | Report | Coady 33' (o.g.); Kone 44' (Madsen); Burrell | Stadium: STōK Cae Ras; Attendance: 10,608; Referee: Ben Speedie |

| 20 September 2025 6 | Norwich City | 2–3 | Wrexham | Norwich |
| 15:00 BST | Topić (yellow card) 13'; Stacey 39' (Jurásek); Makama 90+2' | Report | Doyle (yellow card) 35'; Windass 47' (Kaboré), 59' (Cleworth); Longman 54' (Kaboré) | Stadium: Carrow Road; Attendance: 26,201; Referee: David Webb |

| 27 September 2025 7 | Wrexham | 1–1 | Derby County | Wrexham |
| 12:30 BST | O'Brien (yellow card) 8', (goal) 59' (Kaboré) | Report | Clarke (yellow card) 13'; Adams (yellow card) 36'; Travis (yellow card) 49'; Brereton Díaz; Ozoh (yellow card) 85'; Morris (yellow card) 90+1' | Stadium: STōK Cae Ras; Attendance: 10,613; Referee: Tom Nield |
Note: Fixture was initially scheduled for a 15:00 kick-off, but was moved for live Sky Sports broadcast.

| 30 September 2025 8 | Leicester City | 1–1 | Wrexham | Leicester |
| 19:45 BST | Faes (yellow card) 25'; L. Thomas (yellow card) 34'; James 36' (Daka); Skipp (yellow card) 73' | Report | Longman (yellow card) 57'; Broadhead 77' (O'Brien) | Stadium: King Power Stadium; Attendance: 29,357; Referee: Elliot Bell |

| 3 October 2025 9 | Wrexham | 1–1 | Birmingham City | Wrexham |
| 20:00 BST | Dobson 13' (Cleworth) | Report | Roberts 46' (Stansfield); Koumas (yellow card) 84' | Stadium: STōK Cae Ras; Attendance: 10,669; Referee: Bobby Madley |
Note: Fixture was initially scheduled for 4 October, but was moved for live Sky Sports broadcast.

| 18 October 2025 10 | Stoke City | 1–0 | Wrexham | Stoke-on-Trent |
| 15:00 GMT | Thomas 36' (Cresswell); Cissé (yellow card) 87'; Wilmot (yellow card) 90' | Report | | Stadium: Bet365 Stadium; Attendance: 27,254; Referee: Thomas Bramall |

| 22 October 2025 11 | Wrexham | 1–0 | Oxford United | Wrexham |
| 19:45 BST | Broadhead 14' (Moore); Hyam (yellow card) 37'; Doyle (red card) 67'; Moore (yellow card) 83'; Smith (yellow card) 90+6' | Report | Dembélé (yellow card) 65' | Stadium: STōK Cae Ras; Attendance: 10,547; Referee: Elliot Bell |

| 25 October 2025 12 | Middlesbrough | 1–1 | Wrexham | Middlesbrough |
| 15:00 BST | Hackney 80' (Brittain) | Report | Windass 7' (Thomason), (yellow card) 32'; Dobson (yellow card) 45+4'; O'Brien (yellow card) 65'; M. James (yellow card) 71'; Scarr (yellow card) 90+1' | Stadium: Riverside Stadium; Attendance: 30,046; Referee: Stephen Martin |

| 31 October 2025 13 | Wrexham | 3–2 | Coventry City | Wrexham |
| 20:00 GMT | Sheaf (yellow card) 43'; Moore (yellow card) 54', (goal) 60' (Windass), 69' (Windass), 83' (Windass) | Report | Mason-Clark 22' (Sakamoto); Kitching (yellow card) 54'; Sakamoto 88' (Torp) | Stadium: STōK Cae Ras; Attendance: 10,617; Referee: Anthony Backhouse |
Note: Fixture was initially scheduled for 1 November, but was moved for live Sky Sports broadcast.

| 5 November 2025 14 | Portsmouth | 0–0 | Wrexham | Portsmouth |
| 20:00 GMT | Dozzell (yellow card) 11'; Bishop (yellow card) 73'; Murphy (yellow card) 90+3' | Report | Sheaf (yellow card) 41'; Kaboré (yellow card) 69'; Scarr (yellow card) 73' | Stadium: Fratton Park; Attendance: 19,877; Referee: Bobby Madley |
Note: Fixture was initially scheduled for a 19:45 kick-off, but was moved for live Sky Sports broadcast.

| 8 November 2025 15 | Wrexham | 1–0 | Charlton Athletic | Wrexham |
| 15:00 GMT | Sheaf (yellow card) 37'; Windass 77' (pen.) | Report | Fullah (yellow card) 8'; Bree (yellow card) 55'; Carey (yellow card) 72'; Hernández (yellow card) 90+4' | Stadium: STōK Cae Ras; Attendance: 11,873; Referee: Leigh Doughty |

| 22 November 2025 16 | Ipswich Town | 0–0 | Wrexham | Ipswich |
| 15:00 GMT | Kipré (yellow card) 51'; Matusiwa (yellow card) 64' | Report | Thomason (yellow card) 37'; Sheaf (yellow card) 48'; O'Brien (yellow card) 87' | Stadium: Portman Road; Attendance: 29,147; Referee: Dean Whitestone |

| 26 November 2025 17 | Wrexham | 2–0 | Bristol City | Wrexham |
| 19:45 GMT | Broadhead 16' (Thomason); Scarr (yellow card) 50'; Vítek 74' (o.g.) | Report | Hirakawa (yellow card) 50'; Dickie (yellow card) 53' | Stadium: STōK Cae Ras; Attendance: 10,540; Referee: Ruebyn Ricardo |

| 29 November 2025 18 | Wrexham | 1–1 | Blackburn Rovers | Wrexham |
| 15:00 GMT | M. James (yellow card) 76'; Cleworth 90+5' (Broadhead) | Report | Guðjohnsen 13' (Alebiosu); Forshaw (yellow card) 64'; Pears (yellow card) 81'; Gardner-Hickman (yellow card) 90+7' | Stadium: STōK Cae Ras; Attendance: 10,643; Referee: Tom Reeves |

| 6 December 2025 19 | Preston North End | 1–1 | Wrexham | Preston |
| 15:00 GMT | Devine (yellow card) 49'; Armstrong 81' | Report | Moore 4'; Okonkwo (yellow card) 63' | Stadium: Deepdale; Attendance: 17,842; Referee: Lewis Smith |

| 10 December 2025 20 | Hull City | 2–0 | Wrexham | Kingston upon Hull |
| 20:00 GMT | Joseph 10'; McBurnie 67' (Giles) | Report | Moore (penalty missed) 56'; Dobson (yellow card) 57' | Stadium: MKM Stadium; Attendance: 19,464; Referee: Andrew Kitchen |
Note: Fixture was initially scheduled for a 19:45 kick-off, but was moved for live Sky Sports broadcast.

| 13 December 2025 21 | Wrexham | 2–2 | Watford | Wrexham |
| 15:00 GMT | Windass 21' (M. James), (yellow card) 45'; Moore (yellow card) 38'; Rathbone 90+2'; Sheaf (yellow card) 90+10' | Report | Doumbia 30' (Maamma), (yellow card) 82'; Maamma 42' (Bola); Bola (yellow card) 45'; Alleyne (yellow card) 58'; Chakvetadze (yellow card) 81'; Louza (yellow card) 90+3'; Kyprianou (yellow card) 90+9' | Stadium: STōK Cae Ras; Attendance: 10,667; Referee: Jacob Miles |

| 19 December 2025 22 | Swansea City | 2–1 | Wrexham | Swansea |
| 20:00 GMT | Stamenić (yellow card) 20'; Vipotnik; Galbraith (yellow card) 72'; Idah 90' | Report | Burgess 14' (o.g.); Thomason (yellow card) 18'; McClean (yellow card) 42' | Stadium: Swansea.com Stadium; Attendance: 20,368; Referee: Oliver Langford |
Note: Fixture was initially scheduled for 20 December at 15:00 kick-off, but was moved for live Sky Sports broadcast.

| 26 December 2025 23 | Wrexham | 5–3 | Sheffield United | Wrexham |
| 17:30 GMT | Bindon 9' (o.g.); Moore 28' (Thomason), 76' (Broadhead); Longman 52' (Thomason), (yellow card) 67'; Windass 81' (pen.) | Report | Bamford 7' (Seriki), 15' (Seriki); O'Hare 24'; Hamer (yellow card) 65'; Bindon (yellow card) 80' | Stadium: STōK Cae Ras; Attendance: 10,611; Referee: Andrew Kitchen |
Note: Fixture was initially scheduled for a 15:00 kick-off, but was moved for live Sky Sports broadcast.

| 29 December 2025 24 | Wrexham | 2–1 | Preston North End | Wrexham |
| 19:45 GMT | Broadhead 39' (Moore); Rathbone | Report | Devine | Stadium: STōK Cae Ras; Attendance: 10,616; Referee: Ruebyn Ricardo |

| 1 January 2026 25 | Blackburn Rovers | 0–2 | Wrexham | Blackburn |
| 12:30 GMT | Baradji (yellow card) 30'; Cantwell (yellow card) 37'; Miller (yellow card) 67'; Tronstad (yellow card) 75' | Report | Smith 11' (M. James), (yellow card) 45+1'; Rathbone 38' (Scarr); Dobson (yellow card) 64' | Stadium: Ewood Park; Attendance: 16,494; Referee: Thomas Kirk |
Note: Fixture was initially scheduled for a 15:00 kick-off, but was moved for live Sky Sports broadcast.

| 4 January 2026 26 | Derby County | 1–2 | Wrexham | Derby |
| 15:00 GMT | Brereton Díaz; Sanderson (yellow card) 73' | Report | Smith 25' (Broadhead); Cleworth (yellow card) 30'; M. James 48', (yellow card) 69' | Stadium: Pride Park Stadium; Attendance: 29,939; Referee: Matt Corlett |

| 17 January 2026 27 | Wrexham | 1–2 | Norwich City | Wrexham |
| 15:00 GMT | Smith 24' (Cleworth) | Report | Ben Slimane 9' (Ahmed); Makama 59' (McLean); Mattsson (yellow card) 79' | Stadium: STōK Cae Ras; Attendance: 10,650; Referee: Will Finnie |

| 20 January 2026 28 | Wrexham | 1–1 | Leicester City | Wrexham |
| 20:00 GMT | O'Brien 63'; Doyle (yellow card) 90+4' | Report | Ayew (yellow card) 68'; Pereira (yellow card) 84'; Vestergaard 90' (Okoli) | Stadium: STōK Cae Ras; Attendance: 10,609; Referee: Matthew Donohue |
Note: Fixture was initially scheduled for a 19:45 kick-off, but was rescheduled for live Sky Sports broadcast.

| 24 January 2026 29 | Queens Park Rangers | 2–3 | Wrexham | Shepherd's Bush |
| 15:00 GMT | Vale 6'; Mbengue (yellow card) 44' (yellow-red card) 90'; Smyth (yellow card) 61'; Cook 80' (Madsen) | Report | Scarr (yellow card) 12'; Doyle 54' (Broadhead); Sheaf (yellow card) 56'; Windass 90+3'; Rathbone 90+4' (Windass) | Stadium: Loftus Road; Attendance: 17,502; Referee: Oliver Langford |

| 31 January 2026 30 | Sheffield Wednesday | 0–1 | Wrexham | Sheffield |
| 12:30 GMT | | Report | Smith 58' | Stadium: Hillsborough Stadium; Attendance: 23,297; Referee: David Webb |
Note: Fixture was initially scheduled for a 15:00 kick-off, but was rescheduled for live Sky Sports broadcast.

| 7 February 2026 31 | Wrexham | 0–2 | Millwall | Wrexham |
| 15:00 GMT | Cleworth (yellow card) 57' | Report | Cleworth 59' (o.g.); Ivanović (yellow card) 62'; Bannan (yellow card) 69'; Watson (yellow card) 82'; Coburn 86' (Azeez) | Stadium: STōK Cae Ras; Attendance: 10,663; Referee: Tim Robinson |

| 17 February 2026 32 | Bristol City | 2–2 | Wrexham | Bristol |
| 19:45 GMT | Borges (yellow card) 44'; Armstrong 47'; Bird 89'; Burgzorg (yellow card) 90+1' | Report | Rathbone 34', (yellow card) 40'; Cleworth (yellow card) 54'; Hyam (yellow card) 73'; Williams 76' (o.g.) | Stadium: Ashton Gate; Attendance: 22,915; Referee: Ruebyn Ricardo |
Note: Fixture was initially scheduled for 14 February, but was rescheduled for live Sky Sports broadcast. It was then later rearranged again due to both club's progression in the FA Cup.

| 21 February 2026 33 | Wrexham | 5–3 | Ipswich Town | Wrexham |
| 15:00 GMT | Moore 6' (Windass); Cleworth (yellow card) 25'; Doyle (yellow card) 31' (goal) 75' (O'Brien); Windass 37' (Moore); Rathbone (yellow card) 60'; Hyam (yellow card) 64'; Thomason 66'; Broadhead 86' (O'Brien); Dobson (yellow card) 89' | Report | Mehmeti 20' (Azón); Davis (yellow card) 37'; Kipré (yellow card) 41' (goal) 47'; Azón; Furlong (yellow card) 45+4'; Burns (yellow card) 57' | Stadium: STōK Cae Ras; Attendance: 10,610; Referee: Leigh Doughty |

| 24 February 2026 34 | Wrexham | 2–1 | Portsmouth | Wrexham |
| 19:45 GMT | Smith 23' (Doyle); Cleworth | Report | Poole (yellow card) 30'; Swanson 49' (Poole) | Stadium: STōK Cae Ras; Attendance: 10,499; Referee: Tom Reeves |

| 28 February 2026 35 | Charlton Athletic | 0–1 | Wrexham | Charlton |
| 15:00 GMT | Ramsay (yellow card) 17'; Coventrt (yellow card) 69' | Report | Rathbone 30'; Moore (yellow card) 89' | Stadium: The Valley; Attendance: 21,844; Referee: Farai Hallam |

| 10 March 2026 37 | Wrexham | 1–2 | Hull City | Wrexham |
| 19:45 GMT | Smith (yellow card) 8'; Rathbone (yellow card) 49'; Hyam (yellow card) 66'; Broadhead 76' (Kabore) | Report | McBurnie (yellow card) 7'; Gelhardt 40' (penalty missed) '44; Hughes (yellow card) 45+1'; Koumas 63' (Millar); Collyer (yellow card) 86'; Joseph (yellow card) 90+4' | Stadium: STōK Cae Ras; Attendance: 10,502; Referee: Steve Martin |

| 13 March 2026 38 | Wrexham | 2–0 | Swansea City | Wrexham |
| 20:00 GMT | Broadhead 25' (Doyle); Cullen 88' (o.g.) | Report | Yalcouyé (yellow card) 62'; Tymon (yellow card) 77' | Stadium: STōK Cae Ras; Attendance: 10,641; Referee: Tom Nield |
Note: Fixture was initially scheduled for 14 March, but was rearranged for Sky Sports broadcasting.

| 17 March 2026 36 | Watford | 3–1 | Wrexham | Watford |
| 19:45 GMT | Bola 18' (Chakvetadze); Kayembe 38' (Irankunda); Chakvetadze (yellow card) 81'; Bove 90+4' (yellow card) 90+5' | Report | Cleworth 49' (Rathbone) | Stadium: Vicarage Road; Attendance: 16,378; Referee: Adam Herczeg |
Note: Fixture was initially scheduled for a 15:00 kick-off, but was brought forward for live Sky Sports broadcasting. It was then postponed due to FA Cup fifth round involvements.

| 21 March 2026 39 | Sheffield United | 1–2 | Wrexham | Sheffield |
| 15:00 GMT | Brooks 49'; Riedewald (yellow card) 61' | Report | Windass; Dobson (yellow card) 56'; Smith 78' (Kabore) (yellow card) 79'; Doyle (yellow card) 82' | Stadium: Bramall Lane; Attendance: 27,997; Referee: Samuel Allison |

| 3 April 2026 40 | West Bromwich Albion | 2–2 | Wrexham | West Bromwich |
| 15:00 BST | Dobson 26' (o.g.); Maja 38' (pen.); Styles (yellow card) 61'; Campbell (yellow card) 74' | Report | Kabore (yellow card) 38'; Windass 47' (O'Brien); Dobson 62' (O'Brien) | Stadium: The Hawthorns; Attendance: 25,927; Referee: Bobby Madley |

| 7 April 2026 41 | Wrexham | 1–5 | Southampton | Wrexham |
| 20:00 BST | Windass 34' (Moore); Doyle (yellow card) 37'; Longman (yellow card) 81' | Report | Matsuki 12'; Downes 22'; Larin 61'; Stewart 81'; Azaz 83' | Stadium: STōK Cae Ras; Attendance: 10,547; Referee: Gavin Ward |
Note: Fixture was initially scheduled for 6 April, but was rearranged due to Southampton in FA Cup quarter-final involvements.

| 12 April 2026 42 | Birmingham City | 2–0 | Wrexham | Birmingham |
| 12:00 BST | Jhon Solís (yellow card) 25'; Carlos Vicente 48' (Wagner); Klarer 71' (Paik Seung-ho) | Report | Cleworth (yellow card) 27' | Stadium: St Andrew's; Attendance: 28,054; Referee: David Webb |
Note: Fixture was initially scheduled for 11 April, but was rescheduled for live Sky Sports broadcasting.

| 18 April 2026 43 | Wrexham | 2–0 | Stoke City | Wrexham |
| 15:00 BST | Thomason 31'; Windass 33' | Report | Manhoef (yellow card) 47' | Stadium: STōK Cae Ras; Attendance: 10,633; Referee: Adam Herczeg |

| 21 April 2026 44 | Oxford United | 0–1 | Wrexham | Oxford |
| 19:45 BST | Emakhu (yellow card) 62'; Mills (yellow card) 90+2' | Report | Longman (yellow card) 32'; Windass; Kaboré (yellow card) 66'; Dobson (yellow card) 90+4' | Stadium: Kassam Stadium; Attendance: 11,128; Referee: Matt Donohue |

| 26 April 2026 45 | Coventry City | 3–1 | Wrexham | Coventry |
| 12:00 BST | Thomas-Asante 19' (Mason-Clark); Onyeka (yellow card) 29'; Eccles (yellow card) 50'; Torp 80'; Mason-Clark 90+4' (Onyeka) | Report | Rathbone 25' (Kabore) (yellow card) 53'; James (yellow card) 40' | Stadium: Coventry Building Society Arena; Attendance: 31,003; Referee: Sam Allison |
Note: Fixture was initially scheduled for 25 April, but was pushed back a day later for live Sky Sports broadcasting.

| 2 May 2026 46 | Wrexham | 2–2 | Middlesbrough | Wrexham |
| 12:30 BST | Windass 28'; Smith 41' (Kabore) | Report | Conway 4'; Strelec 44' (Targett) | Stadium: STōK Cae Ras; Attendance: 10,716; Referee: Oliver Langford |

=== FA Cup ===
Wrexham were drawn at home to Nottingham Forest in the third round, home to Ipswich Town in the fourth round and home to Chelsea in the fifth round.

Win Draw Loss Fixtures

| 9 January 2026 Third round | Wrexham | 3–3 (a.e.t.) (4–3 p) | Nottingham Forest | Wrexham |
| 19:30 GMT | Cacace; Rathbone 40' (Broadhead); Hyam; Windass (yellow card) 120' | Report | Igor Jesus 64' (Savona); Hudson-Odoi 76', 89' (Savona); Hutchinson (yellow card) 87'; Douglas Luiz (yellow card) 87'; Morato (yellow card) 112'; Domínguez (yellow card) 112' | Stadium: STōK Cae Ras; Attendance: 10,603; Referee: Paul Tierney |
| | Penalties |
| | Windass (penalty scored); McClean (penalty missed); Doyle (penalty scored); Thomason (penalty scored); Rodriguez (penalty scored) | | (penalty scored) Gibbs-White; (penalty missed) Igor Jesus; (penalty scored) Hudson-Odoi; (penalty scored) Williams; (penalty missed) Hutchinson |

| 13 February 2026 Fourth round | Wrexham | 1–0 | Ipswich Town | Wrexham |
| 19:45 GMT | Windass 34' (Longman) | Report | Egeli (yellow card) 83' | Stadium: STōK Cae Ras; Attendance: 10,496; Referee: Ben Speedie |

| 7 March 2026 Fifth round | Wrexham | 2–4 (a.e.t.) | Chelsea | Wrexham |
| 17:45 GMT | Smith 18' (Doyle); Doyle 78' (Windass); Dobson (red card) 90+3'; Thomason (yellow card) 102'; Moore (yellow card) 120' | Report | Lavia (yellow card) 23'; Okonkwo 40' (o.g.); Acheampong 82'; Garnacho 96' (Essugo) (yellow card) 120'; Santos (yellow card) 110'; João Pedro 120+5' (Essugo) | Stadium: STōK Cae Ras; Attendance: 10,556; Referee: Peter Bankes |

=== EFL Cup ===
Wrexham were drawn at home to Hull City in the first round, away to Preston North End in the second round, home to Reading in the third round and to Cardiff City in the fourth round.

Win Draw Loss Fixtures

| 12 August 2025 First round | Wrexham | 3–3 (5–3 p) | Hull City | Wrexham |
| 19:45 BST | Lee 31' (McClean); Palmer 90+1' (McClean), 90+2' (Barnett) | Report | Hughes (yellow card) 27'; McBurnie 36' (Drameh); Gelhardt (yellow card) 53'; Ndala 70' (Gelhardt); Crooks 81' (Palmer); Lundstram (yellow card) 90+3' | Stadium: STōK Cae Ras; Attendance: 10,106; Referee: Josh Smith |
| | Penalties |
| | McClean (penalty scored); Lee (penalty scored); Windass (penalty scored); Palmer (penalty scored); Marriott (penalty scored) | | (penalty scored) Palmer; (penalty missed) Ndala; (penalty scored) Kamara; (penalty scored) Giles |

| 26 August 2025 Second round | Preston North End | 2–3 | Wrexham | Preston |
| 19:45 BST | Dobbin 7' (Carroll); Lindsay 32' (Devine); Vukčević (yellow card) 82' | Report | Hardie 11' (Doyle); Ashfield 59' (Lee); Lee (yellow card) 85'; Moore 90+2' | Stadium: Deepdale; Attendance: 12,350; Referee: Adam Herczeg |

| 23 September 2025 Third round | Wrexham | 2–0 | Reading | Wrexham |
| 19:45 BST | Thomason (yellow card) 34'; Broadhead 57', 70' (Barnett) | Report | | Stadium: STōK Cae Ras; Attendance: 9,457; Referee: Simon Mather |

| 28 October 2025 Fourth round | Wrexham | 1–2 | Cardiff City | Wrexham |
| 20:00 GMT | Moore 52' | Report | Salech 13'; Bagan (yellow card) 54'; Kpakio (yellow card) 56'; Fish 71' (Bagan); Robertson (yellow card) 90+2' | Stadium: STōK Cae Ras; Attendance: 10,563; Referee: Gavin Ward |

== Statistics ==
=== Appearances and goals ===
Players with no appearances are not included on the list; italics indicate a loaned in player

| No. | Pos | Nat | Player | Total | | Championship | | FA Cup | | EFL Cup | |
| No. | Pos | Nat | Player | Apps | Goals | Apps | Goals | Apps | Goals | Apps | Goals |
|---|---|---|---|---|---|---|---|---|---|---|---|
| 1 | GK | (Nigeria) NGR | Arthur Okonkwo | 44 | 0 | 38+1 | 0 | 3+0 | 0 | 2+0 | 0 |
| 2 | DF | (England) ENG | Callum Doyle | 39 | 3 | 32+2 | 2 | 3+0 | 1 | 2+0 | 0 |
| 3 | DF | (England) ENG | Lewis Brunt | 12 | 0 | 6+3 | 0 | 0+1 | 0 | 1+1 | 0 |
| 4 | DF | (England) ENG | Max Cleworth | 45 | 3 | 40+1 | 3 | 2+0 | 0 | 1+1 | 0 |
| 5 | DF | (Scotland) SCO | Dominic Hyam | 43 | 1 | 40+0 | 0 | 3+0 | 1 | 0+0 | 0 |
| 6 | DF | (England) ENG | Conor Coady | 6 | 0 | 5+0 | 0 | 0+0 | 0 | 1+0 | 0 |
| 7 | FW | (England) ENG | Davis Keillor-Dunn | 7 | 0 | 0+6 | 0 | 0+1 | 0 | 0+0 | 0 |
| 9 | FW | (Scotland) SCO | Ryan Hardie | 10 | 1 | 2+4 | 0 | 0+0 | 0 | 2+2 | 1 |
| 10 | MF | (England) ENG | Josh Windass | 46 | 17 | 28+13 | 16 | 1+2 | 1 | 0+2 | 0 |
| 11 | FW | (Jamaica) JAM | Bailey Cadamarteri | 3 | 0 | 0+3 | 0 | 0+0 | 0 | 0+0 | 0 |
| 12 | DF | (Burkina Faso) BFA | Issa Kaboré | 31 | 0 | 25+4 | 0 | 0+1 | 0 | 0+1 | 0 |
| 13 | DF | (New Zealand) NZL | Liberato Cacace | 13 | 1 | 8+4 | 0 | 1+0 | 1 | 0+0 | 0 |
| 14 | MF | (England) ENG | George Thomason | 36 | 1 | 26+5 | 1 | 2+1 | 0 | 2+0 | 0 |
| 15 | MF | (England) ENG | George Dobson | 46 | 2 | 31+9 | 2 | 3+0 | 0 | 1+2 | 0 |
| 16 | FW | (England) ENG | Jay Rodriguez | 8 | 0 | 0+7 | 0 | 0+1 | 0 | 0+0 | 0 |
| 18 | MF | (England) ENG | Ben Sheaf | 30 | 0 | 24+4 | 0 | 1+1 | 0 | 0+0 | 0 |
| 19 | FW | (Wales) WAL | Kieffer Moore | 43 | 13 | 30+9 | 11 | 0+2 | 0 | 0+2 | 2 |
| 20 | MF | (England) ENG | Oliver Rathbone | 30 | 8 | 13+13 | 7 | 3+0 | 1 | 1+0 | 0 |
| 21 | GK | (Wales) WAL | Danny Ward | 8 | 0 | 8+0 | 0 | 0+0 | 0 | 0+0 | 0 |
| 24 | MF | (England) ENG | Dan Scarr | 24 | 0 | 15+5 | 0 | 1+0 | 0 | 3+0 | 0 |
| 25 | GK | (England) ENG | Callum Burton | 2 | 0 | 0+0 | 0 | 0+0 | 0 | 2+0 | 0 |
| 26 | DF | (Kenya) KEN | Zak Vyner | 9 | 0 | 5+3 | 0 | 1+0 | 0 | 0+0 | 0 |
| 27 | MF | (England) ENG | Lewis O'Brien | 45 | 4 | 29+9 | 4 | 2+1 | 0 | 1+3 | 0 |
| 28 | FW | (England) ENG | Sam Smith | 45 | 9 | 15+23 | 8 | 3+0 | 1 | 4+0 | 0 |
| 29 | MF | (England) ENG | Ryan Barnett | 18 | 0 | 4+8 | 0 | 0+2 | 0 | 3+1 | 0 |
| 33 | FW | (Wales) WAL | Nathan Broadhead | 41 | 9 | 20+17 | 7 | 1+1 | 0 | 2+0 | 2 |
| 34 | DF | (England) ENG | Aaron James | 1 | 0 | 0+0 | 0 | 0+0 | 0 | 1+0 | 0 |
| 37 | MF | (England) ENG | Matty James | 39 | 1 | 24+13 | 1 | 0+0 | 0 | 1+1 | 0 |
| 38 | MF | (England) ENG | Elliot Lee | 3 | 1 | 0+0 | 0 | 0+0 | 0 | 3+0 | 1 |
| 45 | MF | (Wales) WAL | Harry Ashfield | 3 | 1 | 0+1 | 0 | 0+0 | 0 | 2+0 | 1 |
| 47 | MF | (England) ENG | Ryan Longman | 40 | 2 | 23+10 | 2 | 3+0 | 0 | 2+2 | 0 |
Players who featured but departed the club during the season:
| 5 | DF | (Republic of Ireland) IRL | Eoghan O'Connell | 2 | 0 | 0+0 | 0 | 0+0 | 0 | 2+0 | 0 |
| 7 | DF | (Republic of Ireland) IRL | James McClean | 19 | 0 | 10+6 | 0 | 0+1 | 0 | 2+0 | 0 |
| 11 | FW | (England) ENG | Jack Marriott | 1 | 0 | 0+0 | 0 | 0+0 | 0 | 0+1 | 0 |
| 12 | MF | (England) ENG | George Evans | 2 | 0 | 0+0 | 0 | 0+0 | 0 | 2+0 | 0 |
| 17 | DF | (The Gambia) GAM | Jacob Mendy | 1 | 0 | 0+0 | 0 | 0+0 | 0 | 1+0 | 0 |
| 35 | FW | (England) ENG | Ollie Palmer | 1 | 2 | 0+0 | 0 | 0+0 | 0 | 0+1 | 2 |

=== Goals ===
| Rank | Pos. | Nat. | No. | Player | Championship | FA Cup | EFL Cup | Total |
|---|---|---|---|---|---|---|---|---|
| 1 | FW | (England) | 10 | Josh Windass | 16 | 1 | 0 | 17 |
| 2 | FW | (Wales) | 19 | Kieffer Moore | 11 | 0 | 2 | 13 |
| 3 | FW | (England) | 33 | Nathan Broadhead | 7 | 0 | 2 | 9 |
| 3 | FW | (England) | 28 | Sam Smith | 8 | 1 | 0 | 9 |
| 5 | MF | (England) | 20 | Oliver Rathbone | 7 | 1 | 0 | 8 |
| 6 | MF | (England) | 27 | Lewis O'Brien | 4 | 0 | 0 | 4 |
| 7 | DF | (England) | 2 | Callum Doyle | 2 | 1 | 0 | 3 |
| 7 | DF | (England) | 4 | Max Cleworth | 3 | 0 | 0 | 3 |
| 9 | FW | (England) | 9 | Ollie Palmer | 0 | 0 | 2 | 2 |
| 9 | MF | (England) | 47 | Ryan Longman | 2 | 0 | 0 | 2 |
| 9 | MF | (England) | 15 | George Dobson | 2 | 0 | 0 | 2 |
| 12 | MF | (England) | 14 | George Thomason | 1 | 0 | 0 | 1 |
| 12 | MF | (England) | 38 | Elliot Lee | 0 | 0 | 1 | 1 |
| 12 | FW | (Scotland) | 9 | Ryan Hardie | 0 | 0 | 1 | 1 |
| 12 | MF | (Wales) | 45 | Harry Ashfield | 0 | 0 | 1 | 1 |
| 12 | DF | (New Zealand) | 13 | Liberato Cacace | 0 | 1 | 0 | 1 |
| 12 | DF | (Scotland) | 5 | Dominic Hyam | 0 | 1 | 0 | 1 |
| 12 | MF | (England) | 37 | Matty James | 1 | 0 | 0 | 1 |
| Own goals | | | | | 5 | 0 | 0 | 5 |
| Total | | | | | 69 | 6 | 9 | 84 |

=== Assists ===
| Rank | Pos. | Nat. | No. | Player | Championship | FA Cup | EFL Cup | Total |
|---|---|---|---|---|---|---|---|---|
| 1 | DF | (Burkina Faso) | 12 | Issa Kaboré | 8 | 0 | 0 | 8 |
| 2 | MF | (England) | 27 | Lewis O'Brien | 7 | 0 | 0 | 7 |
| 3 | MF | (England) | 10 | Josh Windass | 5 | 1 | 0 | 6 |
| 4 | FW | (Wales) | 33 | Nathan Broadhead | 4 | 1 | 0 | 5 |
| 5 | DF | (Republic of Ireland) | 7 | James McClean | 2 | 0 | 2 | 4 |
| 5 | MF | (England) | 14 | George Thomason | 4 | 0 | 0 | 4 |
| 5 | DF | (England) | 4 | Max Cleworth | 4 | 0 | 0 | 4 |
| 5 | MF | (England) | 15 | George Dobson | 2 | 2 | 0 | 4 |
| 5 | FW | (Wales) | 19 | Kieffer Moore | 4 | 0 | 0 | 4 |
| 10 | DF | (England) | 2 | Callum Doyle | 1 | 1 | 1 | 3 |
| 11 | MF | (England) | 29 | Ryan Barnett | 0 | 0 | 2 | 2 |
| 11 | MF | (England) | 37 | Matty James | 2 | 0 | 0 | 2 |
| 11 | MF | (England) | 47 | Ryan Longman | 1 | 1 | 0 | 2 |
| 11 | FW | (England) | 28 | Sam Smith | 2 | 0 | 0 | 2 |
| 15 | MF | (England) | 38 | Elliot Lee | 0 | 0 | 1 | 1 |
| 15 | DF | (England) | 24 | Dan Scarr | 1 | 0 | 0 | 1 |
| 15 | DF | (England) | 2 | Callum Doyle | 1 | 0 | 0 | 1 |
| 15 | MF | (England) | 20 | Oliver Rathbone | 1 | 0 | 0 | 1 |
| Total | | | | | 49 | 4 | 6 | 59 |

=== Clean sheets ===
| Rank | Pos. | Nat. | No. | Player | Championship | FA Cup | EFL Cup | Total |
|---|---|---|---|---|---|---|---|---|
| 1 | GK | (England) | 1 | Arthur Okonkwo | 9 | 1 | 0 | 10 |
| 2 | GK | (Wales) | 21 | Danny Ward | 3 | 0 | 0 | 3 |
| 2 | GK | (England) | 25 | Callum Burton | 0 | 0 | 1 | 1 |
| Total | | | | | 12 | 1 | 1 | 14 |

=== Hat-tricks ===
| Player | Against | Result | Date | Competition | Ref. |
|---|---|---|---|---|---|
| Kieffer Moore | Coventry City | 3–2 (H) | 31 October 2025 | Championship | |

=== Disciplinary record ===
| Pos. | Nat. | No. | Player | Championship | | | FA Cup | | | EFL Cup | | | Total | | |
| Pos. | Nat. | No. | Player | Yellow card | (yellow card) (yellow-red card) | Red card | Yellow card | (yellow card) (yellow-red card) | Red card | Yellow card | (yellow card) (yellow-red card) | Red card | Yellow card | (yellow card) (yellow-red card) | Red card |
|---|---|---|---|---|---|---|---|---|---|---|---|---|---|---|---|
| GK | (England) | 1 | Arthur Okonkwo | 1 | 0 | 0 | 0 | 0 | 0 | 0 | 0 | 0 | 1 | 0 | 0 |
| DF | (England) | 2 | Callum Doyle | 6 | 0 | 1 | 0 | 0 | 0 | 0 | 0 | 0 | 6 | 0 | 1 |
| DF | (England) | 3 | Lewis Brunt | 1 | 0 | 0 | 0 | 0 | 0 | 0 | 0 | 0 | 1 | 0 | 0 |
| DF | (England) | 4 | Max Cleworth | 6 | 0 | 0 | 0 | 0 | 0 | 0 | 0 | 0 | 6 | 0 | 0 |
| DF | (Scotland) | 5 | Dominic Hyam | 4 | 0 | 0 | 0 | 0 | 0 | 0 | 0 | 0 | 4 | 0 | 0 |
| DF | (Republic of Ireland) | 7 | James McClean | 2 | 0 | 0 | 0 | 0 | 0 | 0 | 0 | 0 | 2 | 0 | 0 |
| MF | (England) | 10 | Josh Windass | 2 | 0 | 0 | 1 | 0 | 0 | 0 | 0 | 0 | 3 | 0 | 0 |
| DF | (Burkina Faso) | 12 | Issa Kaboré | 3 | 0 | 0 | 0 | 0 | 0 | 0 | 0 | 0 | 3 | 0 | 0 |
| MF | (England) | 14 | George Thomason | 2 | 0 | 0 | 1 | 0 | 0 | 1 | 0 | 0 | 4 | 0 | 0 |
| MF | (England) | 15 | George Dobson | 8 | 0 | 0 | 0 | 0 | 1 | 0 | 0 | 0 | 8 | 0 | 1 |
| MF | (England) | 18 | Ben Sheaf | 6 | 0 | 0 | 0 | 0 | 0 | 0 | 0 | 0 | 6 | 0 | 0 |
| FW | (Wales) | 19 | Kieffer Moore | 5 | 0 | 0 | 1 | 0 | 0 | 0 | 0 | 0 | 6 | 0 | 0 |
| MF | (England) | 20 | Oliver Rathbone | 4 | 0 | 0 | 0 | 0 | 0 | 0 | 0 | 0 | 4 | 0 | 0 |
| DF | (England) | 24 | Dan Scarr | 4 | 0 | 0 | 0 | 0 | 0 | 0 | 0 | 0 | 4 | 0 | 0 |
| MF | (England) | 27 | Lewis O'Brien | 4 | 0 | 0 | 0 | 0 | 0 | 0 | 0 | 0 | 4 | 0 | 0 |
| FW | (England) | 28 | Sam Smith | 4 | 0 | 0 | 0 | 0 | 0 | 0 | 0 | 0 | 4 | 0 | 0 |
| MF | (England) | 37 | Matty James | 5 | 0 | 0 | 0 | 0 | 0 | 0 | 0 | 0 | 5 | 0 | 0 |
| MF | (England) | 38 | Elliot Lee | 0 | 0 | 0 | 0 | 0 | 0 | 1 | 0 | 0 | 1 | 0 | 0 |
| MF | (England) | 47 | Ryan Longman | 4 | 0 | 0 | 0 | 0 | 0 | 0 | 0 | 0 | 4 | 0 | 0 |
| Total | | | | 71 | 0 | 1 | 3 | 0 | 1 | 2 | 0 | 0 | 76 | 0 | 2 |

== Home attendance ==
| Competition | Total | Matches | Average |
|---|---|---|---|
| Championship | 244,836 | 23 | 10,645 |
| FA Cup | 31,655 | 3 | 10,552 |
| EFL Cup | 30,126 | 3 | 10,042 |
| Total | 306,617 | 29 | 10,413 |
