= Issa Kaboré =

Burkinabé footballer (born 2001)

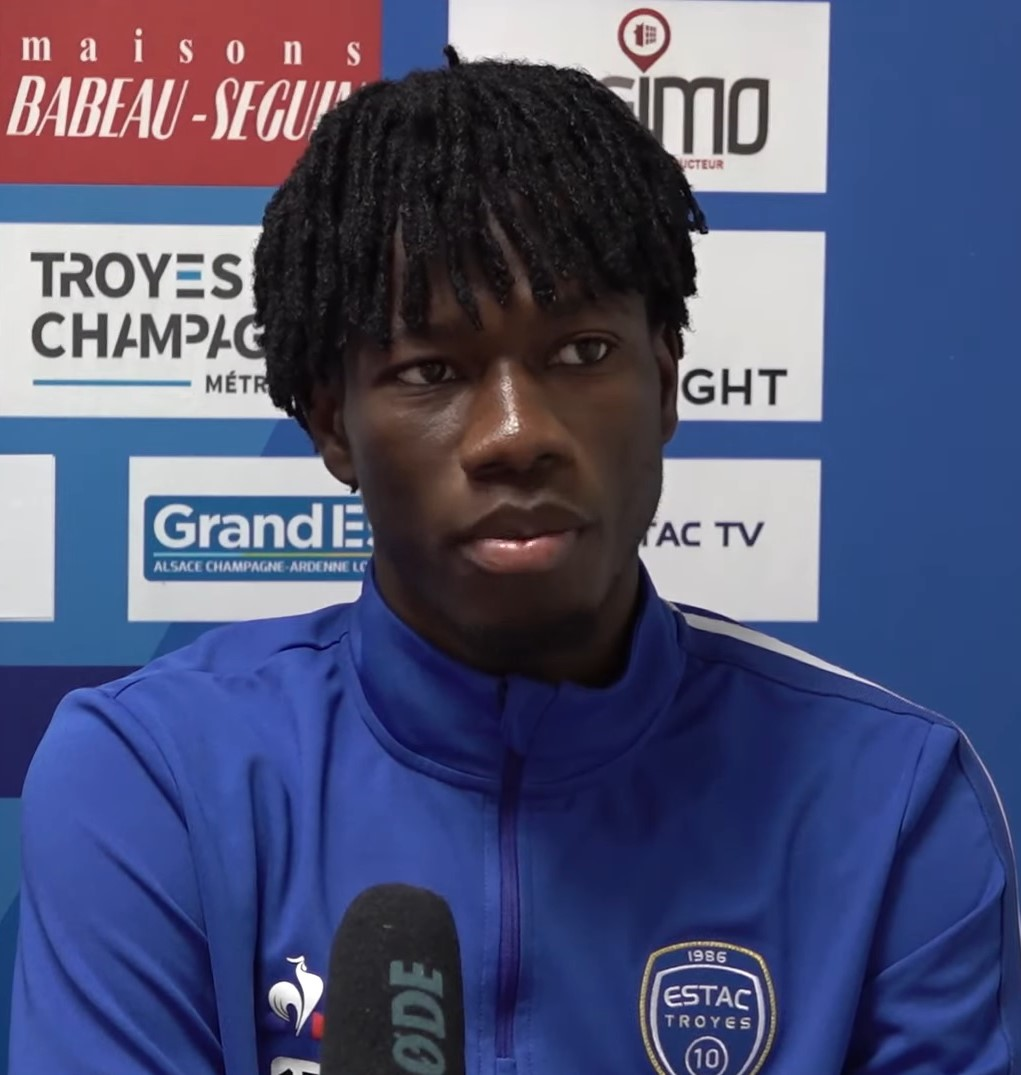
- Kaboré with Troyes in 2021

Personal information
- Full name: Issa Kaboré
- Date of birth: 12 May 2001 (age 25)
- Place of birth: Bobo-Dioulasso, Burkina Faso
- Height: 1.80 m (5 ft 11 in)
- Positions: Right-back; right wing-back

Team information
- Current team: Wrexham
- Number: 12

Youth career
- 2011–2019: Rahimo FC

Senior career*
Years	Team	Apps	(Gls)
2019–2020	Mechelen	5	(0)
2020–2026	Manchester City	0	(0)
2020	→ Mechelen (loan)	27	(0)
2021–2022	→ Troyes (loan)	31	(0)
2022–2023	→ Marseille (loan)	22	(1)
2023–2024	→ Luton Town (loan)	24	(0)
2024–2025	→ Benfica (loan)	3	(0)
2025	→ Werder Bremen (loan)	9	(0)
2025–2026	→ Wrexham (loan)	30	(0)
2026–	Wrexham	1	(0)

International career^{‡}
2019	Burkina Faso U20	3	(0)
2019–	Burkina Faso	56	(2)
- * Club domestic league appearances and goals as of 07:49, 29 August 2026 (UTC) ‡ National team caps and goals as of 23:52, 31 March 2026 (UTC)

Issa Kaboré (born 12 May 2001) is a Burkinabé professional footballer who plays as a right-back or right wing-back for EFL Championship club Wrexham and the Burkina Faso national team.

== Club career ==
On 28 August 2019, Kaboré signed a professional contract with Belgian Side of KV Mechelen. Kaboré signed for English club Manchester City on 29 July 2020, remaining at Mechelen on loan for the forthcoming season.

In July 2021, he joined Troyes on loan for the 2021–22 season. In August 2022, he joined Marseille on loan for the 2022–23 season. On 29 October 2022, he scored his first Ligue 1 goal in a 2–2 away draw against Strasbourg.

On 21 July 2023, Kaboré joined newly promoted Premier League club Luton Town on a season-long loan.

On 1 September 2024, Kaboré joined Primeira Liga club Benfica, on loan from Manchester City. Having struggled for gametime, he was recalled on 6 January 2025 and joined Bundesliga side Werder Bremen on loan for the remainder of the season.

On 1 September 2025, Kaboré joined EFL Championship club Wrexham on loan until the end of the 2025–26 season. On 20 September, he made his debut for the club, recording two assists in a 3–2 away victory over Norwich City in the league.

On 27 August 2026, Kaboré joined Wrexham on a permanent transfer on a three-year contract.He joined Wrexham from Manchester City for a reported fee of £2 million.

== International career ==
Kaboré made his debut for the Burkina Faso national team in a 0–0 friendly tie with the DR Congo on 9 June 2019.

On 8 October 2021, Kaboré scored his first senior international goal in a 4–0 World Cup qualification victory over Djibouti.

He has been named the Best Young Player of the tournament at the 2021 Africa Cup of Nations held in Cameroon from January to February 2022. Although he did not score a goal in the tournament, Kaboré played a key role in Burkina Faso's run to the last-four stage with his attacking and defensive contributions. He made three assists as his side reached the semi-final where they lost 3–1 to eventual winners Senegal.

On 20 December 2023, Kaboré was named among the 27 players selected by Hubert Velud to represent Burkina Faso at the 2023 Africa Cup of Nations.

On 8 December 2025, Kaboré was named among the 25 players selected by head coach Brama Traoré to represent Burkina Faso at the 2025 Africa Cup of Nations.

== Career statistics ==
=== Club ===
As of 28 August 2026

Appearances and goals by club, season and competition
Club	Season	League			National cup (Note: Includes Belgian Cup, Coupe de France, Taça de Portugal, FA Cup)		League cup (Note: Includes EFL Cup, Taça da Liga)		Europe		Total	
Club	Season	Division	Apps	Goals	Apps	Goals	Apps	Goals	Apps	Goals	Apps	Goals
Mechelen	2019–20	Belgian Pro League	5	0	0	0	—		—		5	0
Manchester City	2020–21	Premier League	0	0	0	0	0	0	0	0	0	0
Manchester City	2021–22	Premier League	0	0	0	0	0	0	0	0	0	0
Manchester City	2022–23	Premier League	0	0	0	0	0	0	0	0	0	0
Manchester City	2023–24	Premier League	0	0	0	0	0	0	0	0	0	0
Manchester City	2024–25	Premier League	0	0	0	0	0	0	0	0	0	0
Manchester City	2025–26	Premier League	0	0	0	0	0	0	0	0	0	0
Manchester City	2026–27	Premier League	0	0	—		—		—		0	0
Manchester City	Total		0	0	0	0	0	0	0	0	0	0
Mechelen (loan)	2020–21	Belgian Pro League	27	0	2	0	—		—		29	0
Troyes (loan)	2021–22	Ligue 1	31	0	1	0	—		—		32	0
Marseille (loan)	2022–23	Ligue 1	22	1	3	0	—		4 (Note: Appearances in UEFA Champions League)	0	29	1
Luton Town (loan)	2023–24	Premier League	24	0	0	0	2	0	—		26	0
Benfica (loan)	2024–25	Primeira Liga	3	0	1	0	1	0	2	0	7	0
Werder Bremen (loan)	2024–25	Bundesliga	9	0	0	0	—		—		9	0
Wrexham (loan)	2025–26	Championship	30	0	1	0	1	0	—		32	0
Wrexham	2025–26	Championship	2	0	0	0	—		—		2	0
Wrexham	Wrexham total		32	0	1	0	1	0	0	0	34	0
Career total			152	1	8	0	4	0	6	0	171	1

=== International ===
As of match played 31 March 2026

Appearances and goals by national team and year
National team	Year	Apps	Goals
Burkina Faso	2019	2	0
Burkina Faso	2020	4	0
Burkina Faso	2021	11	1
Burkina Faso	2022	13	1
Burkina Faso	2023	6	0
Burkina Faso	2024	9	0
Burkina Faso	2025	8	0
Burkina Faso	2026	3	0
Total		56	2

As of match played 31 March 2026
Burkina Faso score listed first, score column indicates score after each Kaboré goal

List of international goals scored by Issa Kaboré
No.	Date	Venue	Cap	Opponent	Score	Result	Competition	Ref.
1	8 August 2021	Stade de Marrakech, Marrakesh, Morocco	13	Djibouti	3–0	4–0	2022 FIFA World Cup qualification	
2	2 January 2022	The Sevens Stadium, Dubai, United Arab Emirates	18	Gabon	1–0	3–0	Friendly	

== Honours ==
Manchester City

- FA Community Shield: 2024
- Africa Cup of Nations Best Young Player: 2021
