= ESG Quant =

ESG Quant (or ESG Quantitative) is an investment strategy, developed by Arabesque Partners, which involves quantitative equity investing while utilizing ESG (environmental, social, and corporate governance) information, often referred to as "non-financial" information. ESG Quant strategies are implemented within systematic trading or quantitative trading approaches that leverage a large and growing collection of commercial ESG, alternative and non-profit or academic datasets. As such, there is no human judgment or discretionary buy-sell decision making; rather, “in a pure quant model the final decision to buy or sell is made by the model” or through the “utilization of an expert system that replicates previously captured actions of real traders.”

== ESG materiality ==
ESG Quant funds invest in companies with strong performance on the material ESG issues for their sector and region. As a result, such funds aim to invest in sustainable companies, which are better positioned for future stock price outperformance, as shown by a growing body of literature.

A growing body of research around ESG Quant funds suggests ESG compliance and alpha generation are not mutually exclusive outcomes. Several ESG-modelled portfolio construction frameworks have since surfaced to optimize portfolio returns, including a patented method and system conceived by PanAgora Asset Management’s Mike Chen and George Mussalli.

== Non-financial information ==
In determining the ESG properties of companies, ESG Quant funds rely on the use and processing of non-financial performance indicators. Such information is gathered through corporate sustainability reporting or through external data providers, such as Sensefolio or Sustainalytics. A growing number of non-financial disclosure and reporting initiatives are promoting corporate transparency, including the Global Reporting Initiative (GRI), the International Integrated Reporting Council (IIRC) and the Sustainability Accounting Standards Board (SASB). In addition, there is increasing regulatory pressure, as witnessed by the European Parliament and Council of the European Union directive on "non-financial and diversity information by certain large undertakings and groups".

== ESG as a risk factor ==
ESG information captures many risk drivers not captured through traditional financial metrics. Quant ESG strategists, for example, can scrape and analyze social media content to help inform and assign value to company intangibles, such as customer and employee reputation. ESG information can be considered as a risk factor that is an investment theme that has stable cross-sectional correlations to returns, thereby rewarding stocks that have an exposure to them. ESG factors can be included with traditional thematic factors such as momentum, value, quality, growth, and volatility. ESG factors may also provide diversification benefits due to their low correlation to traditional factors.
