= Climate Disclosure Standards Board =

UK non-profit organization

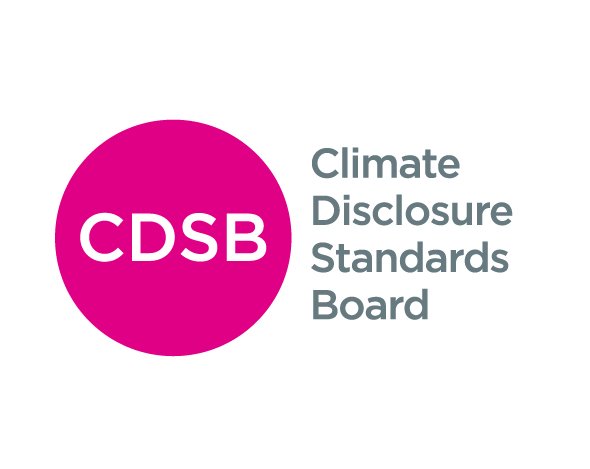
- Logo of the Climate Disclosure Standards Board
- Abbreviation: CDSB
- Formation: 2007
- Type: Not for profit organization, Charity
- Legal status: Managed as a Special Project of CDP Worldwide, a registered UK Charity
- Headquarters: London
- Region served: Global
- Members: World Economic Forum Ceres, INCR; WBCSD; CDP; GHG Protocol Initiative, WRI; The Climate Registry; International Emissions Trading Association; The Climate Group The Sustainability Accounting Standards Board
- Chairman: Richard Samans
- Founder: Lois Guthrie
- Managing Director: Mardi McBrien
- Chairman, Technical Working Group: Lois Guthrie
- Website: www.cdsb.net

The Climate Disclosure Standards Board (CDSB) is a non-profit organization working to provide material information for investors and financial markets through the integration of climate change-related information into mainstream financial reporting. CDSB operates on the premise that investors and financial institutions can make better and informed decisions if companies are open, transparent and analyse the risks and opportunities associated with climate change-related information. To this end, CDSB acts as a forum for collaboration on how existing standards and practices can be used to link financial and climate change-related information using its Framework for reporting environmental information, natural capital and associated business impacts.

The Framework is a standards-ready tool for companies to disclose climate change-related information in mainstream financial reports. Updated in April 2018, the Framework for reporting environmental information, natural capital and associated business impacts adopts and relies on relevant provisions of existing standards and practices, including the TCFD recommendations and International Financial Reporting Standards as well as reflecting regulatory and voluntary reporting and carbon trading rules. The distinctiveness of the Framework is that it references standards instead of creating a new one. The Framework also adopts relevant principles and objectives of financial reporting to complement mainstream financial reporting models.

In November 2021, the IFRS Foundation announced it would consolidate the CDSB with its newly formed International Sustainability Standards Board by June 2022, together with the London-based Value Reporting Foundation.

== Background ==
A number of frameworks have been developed to account for and report greenhouse gas emissions and natural capital. However, the lack of harmonization has resulted in inconsistent data and an increased reporting burden on companies. The resulting information is provided in a multiplicity of formats; making analysis and comparison harder for investors and other stakeholders. This has been substantiated by CDSB's research that was commissioned to prepare for the UK Government's Department of Environment and Rural Affairs (DEFRA). During the 2007 World Economic Forum in Davos, CDSB was formed to bridge the gap between the current uncoordinated approaches of reporting by having developed and promoting the Framework for reporting environmental information, natural capital and associated business impacts. CDP acts as a secretariat to CDSB.

== Governance ==
While CDP acts as a secretariat to CDSB, the board members provide strategic direction. CDSB is also supported by its Technical Working Group (TWG), a group of large global accounting firms and their professional advisors, and academics who make recommendations and lead the work on the development and uptake of the Framework for reporting environmental information, natural capital and associated business impacts.

The objectives in developing the global Framework are:

1. Elicit information of value to reporting organisations in devising and implementing their business strategies and to users of climate change-related disclosures made in mainstream reports.
2. Enhance the efficiency of capital allocation by investors, enabling them to integrate climate change-related costs, risks and opportunities into their analyses.
3. Provide corporations with greater certainty on disclosure requirements and encourage the consistency of approach that is necessary for effective benchmarking.
4. Provide conceptual and practical input into deliberations by regulatory agencies contemplating the introduction or development of requirements on corporate climate change-related disclosures.

== CDSB's programmes ==
=== Framework for reporting environmental information, natural capital and associated business impacts ===
The Framework for reporting environmental information, natural capital and associated business impacts sets out an approach for reporting environmental information and natural capital in mainstream reports, such as the annual report, 10-K filing or integrated report. The Framework has been developed by the CDSB Technical Working Group and the Secretariat. Edition 1.0 of the Framework, focusing solely on climate change-related information, was officially launched for public comments in 2009 at the World Business Summit on Climate Change in Copenhagen, Denmark. The Framework was published in September 2010, after four years of consultation. CDSB has developed its Climate Change Reporting Framework and guidance based on existing standards, research and analysis, and good practice working with leading professional organisations. The Framework has since undergone revisions to Edition 1.1 – released in October 2012, to reflect the changes to global accounting principles. The latest edition of the Framework, focusing on environmental and climate change-related information was launched on 9 April 2018.

=== Consistency Report ===
During the last few decades, a number of organizations and governments have developed methodologies and frameworks for corporations to disclose their greenhouse gas emissions. However, there are no internationally agreed standards for reporting corporate climate change-related information. This leads to variations in methodologies, scope and boundaries of reported information, which in turn limits comparability and usefulness, leading to doubts about its quality and reliability. It also increases the cost of climate change reporting for enterprises, especially for those operating in multiple jurisdictions, and may deter smaller, resource-constrained companies from preparing emission inventories. To address these concerns, CDSB, the Organization for Economic Co-operation and Development (OECD) and the United Nations Conference on Trade and Development (UNCTAD) (collectively referred to here as the "project partners") are calling for and are taking actions to encourage consistency of approach to the demand and supply of climate change-related information. The working paper "The case for consistency in corporate climate change disclosure", written by CDSB highlights the numerous issues resulting from the large amount of standards and requirements that international companies need to adhere to.

=== XBRL ===
CDP and CDSB are currently working with a group of global experts, including representatives from the Fujitsu Research Institute, to develop an independent XBRL climate change reporting taxonomy in order to encourage the adoption of the Climate Change Reporting Framework as the standard for climate change reporting. XBRL is an important tool in allowing all stakeholders to more efficiently share and analyze information. These subsequently affect the quality and quantity of corporate reporting data.

=== IIRC and CDSB ===
Integrated Reporting not only consolidates an organization's strategy, governance and financial performance, but also its responsibility and contribution towards the environmental, social and economic factors and the context within which it operates. Integrated Reporting can help businesses to evaluate possibilities, advantages and profits of sustainable choices and enable investors and other stakeholders to understand how an organization is really performing. Many CDSB and CDP members contributed to the development of the International Integrated Reporting Committee's (IIRC) discussion paper, "Towards Integrated Reporting: Communicating Value in the 21st Century", released on 12 September 2011, and to IIRC's wider work program.

CDSB, in partnership with Promethium Carbon, have produced a report titled 'Climate Change-Your Journey to Integrated Reporting'. The report is relevant for companies preparing for, or undertaking Integrated Reporting and shows that climate change affects all capitals of a business, affecting its ability to preserve and create value. As such, it is integral that climate change-related disclosures are included in mainstream financial reports.

=== Rio+20 sustainability and U.K. Directive on GHGs ===
At the 2012 United Nations Conference on Sustainable Development conference in Rio de Janeiro, 20 years after the Rio Earth Summit in 1992, UK Deputy Prime Minister Nick Clegg announced that UK quoted companies will have to disclose and account for greenhouse gas emissions in their Director's Reports from April 2013. The announcement was made to meet the requirements of Section 85 of the Climate Change Act 2008 under which the Secretary of State is obliged to make regulations requiring director's report to contain information about greenhouse gas emissions. The announcement was a result of a public consultation held by Defra during the summer of 2011 in which the government sought views to understand whether or not mandatory reporting should be introduced in the UK. The results favored mandatory reporting a draft regulation was released on July 25, 2012. CDSB's Climate Change Reporting Framework is listed as a method for compliance in the guidance document accompanying the proposed regulation.

=== Task Force on Climate-related Financial Disclosures ===
The CDSB helps companies and policymakers implement recommendations of the Task Force on Climate-related Financial Disclosures which develops voluntary disclosures.

The first USA company to join this program was Hannon Armstrong in December 2017.

The number of companies reporting using the Task Force on Climate-related Financial Disclosures recommendations has grown quickly. Two thirds of companies on the FTSE 100 mentioned TCFD in their 2019 annual reports, according to a study.

== Recognition and adaptation ==
CDSB has been named as one of 50 stars in seriously long term innovation in the new Future Quotient report. The report, co-authored by Volans and JWT, is based on a survey of 500 public, private and NGO leaders about who's leading the charge in sustainability, innovation and social enterprise to create value in the long-term. The outcome of the survey identifies the most future ready companies, groups, individuals and initiatives in the world and CDSB sits alongside Google, China's 5-Year Plan, TED, the Bill and Melinda Gates Foundation and the London Organising Committee of the Olympic and Paralympic Games.

== See also ==
- Climate risk
- Fossil fuel divestment
- Socially responsible investing
