= Sustainability reporting =

Reporting about ESG sustainability

Sustainability reporting refers to the disclosure, whether voluntary, solicited, or required, of non-financial performance information to outsiders of the organization. Sustainability reporting deals with qualitative and quantitative information concerning environmental, social, economic, and governance issues. These are the criteria often gathered under the acronym ESG (environmental, social and corporate governance).

The introduction of non-financial information in published reports is seen as a step forward in corporate communications and an effective way to increase corporate engagement and transparency.

Sustainability reports can help companies build consumer confidence and improve corporate reputations through transparent disclosure on social responsibility programs and risk management. Such communication aims to give stakeholders broader access to relevant information outside the financial sphere that also influences the company's performance.

In the EU, the mandatory practice of sustainability reporting for certain companies is regulated by the Non-Financial Reporting Directive (NFRD), recently revised and renamed Corporate Sustainability Reporting Directive (CSRD). Commercial frameworks have been developed for sustainability reporting and are issuing standards or similar initiatives to guide companies in this exercise.

There is a wide range of terminology used to qualify this same concept of sustainability reporting: ESG reporting, non-financial reporting, extra-financial reporting, social reporting, CSR reporting, and socio-economic and socio-environmental reporting.

== History ==
Corporate sustainability reporting has a history linked to environmental reporting. Early examples have been traced to the seventeenth and late nineteenth centuries and environmental reporting became popular in the 1970s.

Corporate sustainability reporting practice is rooted in the multidimensional concept of CSR and in the stakeholders model of corporate governance in Europe, which places emphasis on the importance of understanding the company as an entity with relationships with its stakeholders and the environment. According to Freeman's theory, the company's shareholders are not the only ones to be considered, but also its employees, customers, suppliers, local communities, governments: the society in the broadest sense.

With the emergence of this approach, the first response of many companies has been to expand the communication of their achievements in terms of social responsibility. Information disclosed by companies themselves are the first indicators that can be received by the public in order to verify whether the decisions taken meet the announced commitments, as well as its own interests.

The obligation of accountability is therefore often assimilated to reporting and is addressed, in the first place, to the company's stakeholders. This means that both shareholders and society in general are concerned, while also taking future generations into account.

Recently, there has been a growing interest in communications relating to the extra-financial aspects of organizations: CSR performance is now one of the factors considered in investment decisions. The practice of sustainability reporting has existed in a scattered way since the 1980s but has really expanded over the last twenty years.

This is notably due to the global awareness of the ecological crisis and the common interest in sustainable development, but also to the numerous corporate governance scandals of large companies (Enron scandal, Parmalat Financial Fraud...) over the last two decades or the 2008 financial crisis.

In addition to eroding stakeholder trust, these circumstances have increased their activism for broader transparency and ensuring better information from companies.

In this context, the need for sustainability reporting has gradually emerged. It was carried out by companies initially on a voluntary basis, with the aim of mitigating some of the skepticism of users of financial reports and restoring the trust of stakeholders by expressing a willingness to behave responsibly.

The publication of non-financial reports thus began in an ad hoc and rather anecdotal manner, confined to a few subjects deemed worthy of interest by the companies themselves. A copy effect, combined with latent pressure from stakeholders, subsequently contributed to the acceptance and renewal of this approach, which gradually became more structured. Today, 96% of the world’s 250 largest companies (G250) publish sustainability reports, with 78% aligning to the GRI Standards, signaling mainstream integration of sustainability reporting into corporate practices. Indeed, CSR and its concrete implementation are increasingly valued by public opinion.

This interest has led to the emergence of reference frameworks, guidelines, standards and regulations in this area. In addition to helping and guiding companies, this range of resources has also allowed for a certain standardization of both the information disclosed and the method of communication.

The objectives of developing guidelines are to provide companies with a concrete methodology and to make the published data understandable, credible and comparable for their users. Reporting guidelines are issued either by private non-governmental organizations (whose adoption by companies is therefore voluntary), or more recently by governments on the basis of mandatory standards. Indeed, for some companies, this disclosure has been made mandatory (see next section). In line with these developments, some consulting firms have started ESG advisory services and help companies to draft their sustainability reports.

There are a variety of reasons that companies choose to produce these reports, but at their core they are intended to be "vessels of transparency and accountability". Often, they are also intended to improve internal processes, engage stakeholders and persuade investors.

Improved disclosure of non-financial information can have other benefits for reporting companies. In particular, the adoption of sustainability reporting has been found to have a positive impact on company performance and value. OECD suggests that companies showing sustainable performance on ESG criteria and communicating effectively about them seem to enjoy better financial performance. These companies generally benefit from a more diversified investor base, for example through their inclusion in actively managed investment portfolios or sustainability indices. In addition, companies that effectively communicate their non-financial engagements and have a high performance in this area are more likely to attract and retain talents thanks to their greater social credibility, as this stimulates employees' motivation and meets their values.

As a matter of law, in the United States, the materiality principle controls whether a publicly traded corporation must disclose certain information, that is: "a fact is material if there is a substantial likelihood that the fact would have been viewed by a reasonable investor as having significantly altered the ‘total mix’ of information available."

In this case, some authors have examined and applied several factors (including the percentages of managed investment assets that are screened for ESG criteria, plus the fact that over 90% of large publicly traded companies publish ESG data) and concluded that ESG data qualifies as being material. It has also been suggested that other organizations that issue securities may also be well-advised to also engage in sustainability reporting.

The topic of sustainability reporting has become a recurring theme in recent years and the practice has been increasingly professionalized. However, the framework surrounding such reporting is in constant evolution and companies are increasingly challenged by the form, content and process of their sustainability reporting.

While this requirement presents multiple opportunities for firms, investors, consumers and all stakeholders, it also creates a number of challenges. Indeed, for sustainability statements to be relevant and useful, the information disclosed must not only be realistic and reliable, but also verifiable and comparable.

Increasingly, governments are introducing regulations to ensure that companies disclose NFR information. In Australia, companies must disclose information on their environmental performance under the Corporations Act 2001 and the National Greenhouse and Energy Reporting Act 2007. In China, companies must disclose social responsibility information while those listed on the Shanghai and Shenzhen Stock Exchanges must include their corporate social responsibility performance in their annual reports. In South Africa, companies listed on the Johannesburg Stock Exchange must publish an integrated report for all financial years ending on or after March 1, 2010. In North America, the Securities and Exchange Commission requires Canadian and US companies to disclose non-financial information in their annual reports. Finally, the European Union Directive 2014/95/EU introduced mandatory non-financial reporting practices for large European companies.

As governments and financial regulators continue to issue and update reporting requirements, companies are increasingly obligated to disclose their non-financial information. The increased focus on NFI reporting has been driven, in part, by the rise in ESG investing. ESG investing is a form of investing that focuses on companies with strong ESG practices.

The United Nations Conference on Trade and Development - International Standards of Accounting and Reporting (UNCTAD-ISAR) founded the African Regional Partnership for Sustainability and SDG Reporting in 2022. The collaboration has 53 members as of March 2023, including national corporate social responsibility networks and/or ministries from 27 African nations.

== Legal Framework ==
=== European Union ===
In Europe, the legislative framework for sustainability reporting is governed by the Corporate Sustainability Reporting Directive (CSRD, Directive (EU) 2022/2464), which replaces the Non-Financial Reporting Directive (NFRD, Directive 2014/95/EU). The directive provides a uniform regulatory framework for non-financial information for EU Member States.

==== Corporate Sustainability Reporting Directive (CSRD) ====
The CSRD was adopted in December 2022 and came into force on January 5, 2023. Its provisions apply progressively from January 1, 2024, depending on company size and type. In jurisdictions where the CSRD has been transposed into national law, companies already subject to NFRD are expected to publish their first CSRD-reports in early 2025 about their business year 2024.

The CSRD initially increased the scope of reporting entities to about 50.000 organizations in Europe. All companies exceeding two of the following three thresholds are required to publish a sustainability report: i) 250 employees; ii) Balance sheet of €25 million; and iii) Net turnover of €50 million. However, on 26 February 2025 the European Commission proposed a legislative package to simplify EU rules and boost competitiveness (known as Omnibus package). In addition, the Commission submitted a Stop-the-Clock proposal to delay the implementation for Wave 2 and Wave 3 organizations by 2 years until 2028.

==== Non-Financial Reporting Directive (NFRD) ====
The NFRD applied to large public interest undertakings with more than 500 employees on average during the financial year, both single undertaking and consolidated groups. Companies falling within the scope of the Directive must also have a balance sheet total exceeding EUR 20 million and/or a turnover exceeding EUR 40 million, where applicable, on a consolidated basis. By 2021, approximately 11,600 companies in Europe were in its scope of application.

Directive 2014/95/EU of the European Parliament and of the Council of 22 October 2014 amends Directive 2013/34/EU in relation to the disclosure of non-financial and diversity information by certain large undertakings and groups. Two articles (19a and 29a) are inserted into Directive 2013/34/EU, now requiring, for the first time, certain companies to disclose information on how they operate and manage social and environmental challenges. This updated directive applies to all Member States of the European Union. They must bring into force the laws, regulations and administrative provisions needed to comply with the Directive.

A revision process of Directive 2014/95/EU was initiated in January 2020 with the aim of improving the quality and reliability of non-financial reporting and reducing the administrative burden on companies in terms of reporting. A broad public consultation was then organised from February to June 2020 to gather input and opinions from various stakeholders regarding the review of the Directive's provisions. The outcome of this consultation is the European Commission's proposal on 21 April 2021 to revise the NFRD by introducing the Corporate Sustainability Reporting Directive (CSRD).

New EU legislation came into force in December 2023 to introduce changes to the monetary criteria by which company and group sizes are defined in the EU to address the impact of inflation.

==== Content/Scope of application ====
Companies that fall within the scope of the EU Directive 2014/95/EU on non-financial reporting, the main EU-wide initiative in this area, must publish information on the following areas:

- Environmental protection
- Social responsibility and treatment of employees
- Respect for human rights
- The fight against corruption and bribery
- Diversity on company boards (in terms of age, gender, education and professional experience).

Category	Subcategory
Environment	Climate change; Use of natural resources; Polluting discharges; Waste; Biodiversity and ecosystem conservation
Employee and social matters	Employees and workforce; Social matters
Human rights	General human rights reporting criteria; Human rights in supply chains; High risk areas for civil and political rights; Impacts on indigenous and local communities; Conflict resources; Data protection
Anti-Corruption	Anti-Corruption; Whistleblowing channels
General positive impacts	General and sectorial positive impacts by products/sources of opportunity

For each category, the company is also required to briefly describe the group's business model, describe the policies that are applied in these areas, provide the results of these policies, establish the risks related to these areas and finally establish the non-financial KPIs (Key Performance Indicators) of these areas. The information should also be published with the objective to understand the development, performance, position and ultimately the impact of the firm's activities. Under this directive, companies have however no obligation as to how and where they publish this information. They can therefore base themselves on various international or local frameworks depending on their preferences and needs.

In practice, most companies comply with the requirement to describe in detail the policies they apply, particularly in the social and environmental fields. Due diligence policies and procedures relating to human rights and corruption also appear regularly in organisations' reports, but to a lesser extent than social and environmental policies. The reasons for this divergence in the importance an organisation places on certain areas rather than others stem notably from differences in the maturity of the organisation, the evolution of the areas and their relevance to companies over time, and the place of these areas in relation to a company's supply chain. The presentation of policies, KPIs and risks remains a highly disparate practice.

== Initiatives ==
Organizations can improve their sustainability performance by measuring, monitoring and reporting on it, helping them have a positive impact on society, the economy, and a sustainable future. When it comes to reporting, companies have a certain amount of freedom in the drafting of their statements, given the absence of any binding law on this subject.

However, various initiatives (national, European or international) are developing standardized methodologies to help companies build their sustainability reports which, according to the European Directive 2014/95/UE, have to be cited by the companies using them. Some of these are mentioned in the same Directive and in the Commission's Communication COM (2017) 215/1 setting out guidelines on non-financial information.

The key drivers for the quality of sustainability reports are the Standards of the Global Reporting Initiative (GRI), because it is the most widely used benchmark by companies worldwide given its reliability. It provides opportunities for comparison of information related to the economic, environmental, and social impact of undertakings internationally. In addition, the SDG Compass has been created by GRI, the UN Global Compact and the World Business Council for Sustainable Development (WBCSD) with the aim of linking the GRI standards to the Sustainable Development Goals. This document provides guidance on how to report the company’s contribution to the SDGs by leveraging the GRI standards.

A series of other initiatives exist among which we can mention the most prominent ones on the sustainability and CSR reporting scene:

- The International Integrated Reporting Council (IIRC): guide the relevant integration of financial and non-financial information in company’s reports.
- Account Ability's AA1000 Series: establishes the basic principles to be addressed in a non-financial report without guiding the impact measurement.
- United Nations (UN) Global Compact's Communication on Progress (COP): establishes 10 core principles (on human rights, labor/environmental standards and anti-corruption) on which companies measure their performance.
- Organization for Economic Cooperation and Development Guidelines (OECD): international standards set by governments for responsible business by multinationals.
- International Labour Organization Conventions (ILO): concerning right at work.
- International Organization for Standardization Standards (ISO): providing non-binding international norms standards.
- The NFRD and the Guidelines Communication of the Commission.
- The Eco-Management and Audit Scheme (EMAS): created by the European Commission, it helps companies to improve their environmental efficiency.

== Criticism ==
Despite its purpose of having a positive impact on society, sustainability reporting is subject to various criticisms.

First, while companies can refer to the reporting framework that best fits their industry and organization, this freedom implies a lack of standardization that hinders the effectiveness of the sustainability reporting concept. In fact, the multiplication of reporting frameworks makes published information more difficult to interpret in the markets, taking sustainability reporting away from its main objective of transparency and comparison between firms’ performance.

One solution to this issue of comparability of non-financial information is proposed by the European Commission through the creation of European standards built by EFRAG, in the context of the new CSRD. According to the EU, by putting forward a unique standard, this will reduce the costs of disclosure for companies and improve the way investors and stakeholders compare and use the information disclosed.

Another point of criticism concerns the reasons why companies embark on this process. Indeed, as public opinion increasingly values these initiatives, companies tend to perceive CSR more as a competitive advantage, putting aside ethical reasons. Some opportunistic companies can therefore contribute to discrediting the effort by prioritizing their own interests over transparency objectives. Other firms may go even further by manipulating their sustainability reports in order to present a more attractive corporate image, either by hiding negative information or by over-disclosing positive information regarding environmental data, which may distort reality. Such behaviour can be associated with the practice known as greenwashing.

This tendency towards greenwashing may also stem from the wide range of private initiatives that can be chosen by companies to report on sustainability. Indeed, a large part of these initiatives are taken by private non-governmental organisations (GRI, IIRC, SASB, CDP...) and it is only recently that some governments or supranational institutions, such as the European Commission, are developing mandatory standards (NFRD/CSRD and the Communication on the Commission's guidelines, EMAS, ...). Companies can therefore choose the initiative that best suits their objectives, whether they are set out of conviction or for performance reasons. Finally, some doubts are raised as to the real capacity of private sector initiatives to generate radical environmental and social changes necessary for the future of society and to ensure a real legitimacy of the firm's intentions.

Note: The ISSB, established in 2021 by the IFRS Foundation, consolidates SASB and the IIRC to deliver a unified global baseline for sustainability disclosures.

Another alleged pitfall of this practice is that, for the companies that are legally obliged to report in Europe, there are currently no harmonized control rules at the EU level. For most of the Member States implementing this directive, the national designed control stops at the simple verification of the production of these sustainability data. As for sanctions in case of non-compliance with the legal obligation to publish information, they are not prescribed at the European level either. This constitutes a disincentive to introduce strong supervision at national level, and to respect it for companies.

=== Epistemological considerations ===
The difficulty of adapting traditional reporting to the complexity of non-financial information is an additional criticism that can be made of this concept. Indeed, while financial reporting is by nature quantifiable, easy to verify and reliable, non-financial information is struggling to gain legitimacy in the eyes of stakeholders. To remedy this, some companies are using existing financial reporting tools to build new ones adapted to ethical imperatives. However, these initiatives are undertaken by companies that demonstrate a certain maturity in terms of corporate social responsibility and can be overwhelming for smaller companies such as SMEs. In this respect, sustainability reporting is divided into three categories:

Category	Pros	Cons
Idealistic reporting	The complexity of CSR is fully captured through standardization tools; Provide legitimacy	Little interaction between the company's global strategy and its CSR strategy
Lay reporting	Helps to educate the company's internal stakeholders; Adapted for small structures	Not efficient to ensure comparability because of the lack of structure
Technical reporting	Tailored to fulfill legal requirements (2014/95/EU Directive)	Lack of internal and external dialogue

Moreover, despite attempts by the most motivated and capable companies to make their sustainability reporting as legitimate as the financial one, the qualitative dimensions inherent to it and its predominantly narrative nature persist and make performance assessment difficult. According to Baret and Helfrich (2019), indicators such as the statement of the company's values or the company vision are simply not measurable or standardizable, while others can be quantified only if the company has a high implementation capacity (for instance the capacity to conduct surveys on a population, ... etc). From this stems that the selection and presentation of important information to be disclosed is often a matter of managerial discretion, generating the risk of manipulation bias in narrative disclosure.

Quantitative measures such as KPIs therefore have a critical role in supporting the quality of narratives. However, the ability of companies to measure quantitatively their impact depends not only on the availability of objective indicators but also on the control they have over what they measure (for instance, indicators related to suppliers). In addition, many researches raise concerns about the actual reliability of non-financial KPIs, particularly those related to employee performance, community, environment and innovation. What particularly stands out is that the non-comparability of the measures or formats used compromises the consistent use of quantitative indicators. This trend can be observed as much in the different existing ways of measuring the same data, as in the diversity of indicators that one company can choose to illustrate social or environmental disclosures, for example, compared to another.

Finally, while various indicators are necessary for a company to report on the evolution of its sustainable performance, recognized standards (e.g., GRI) can be a good reference for firms. Nevertheless, according to some authors, it remains important for businesses to develop their own indicators adapted to their specific characteristics in order to ensure a proper sustainable reporting.

== See also ==
- Balanced scorecard
- Carbon accounting
- Context-Based Sustainability
- Integrated Reporting
- Islamic Reporting Initiative
- Journal of Accountancy
- Life cycle thinking
- Sustainability accounting
- Sustainable finance
- Sustainability metrics and indices
- World Resources Institute
