= Swedish Workplace HIV/AIDS Programme =

Trade union in Sweden

The Swedish Workplace HIV/AIDS Programme (SWHAP) is a joint initiative by the International Council of Swedish Industry (NIR) and the Swedish Industrial and Metalworkers’ Union (IF Metall). The SWHAP concept is based on close co-operation between the company management, the local trade union branches and workers' representatives. The programme contributes to the establishment and support to HIV and AIDS programmes at Swedish companies and their partners in Sub-Saharan Africa. In 2010, SWHAP supported close to 90 workplaces directly and reached out to 20,000 employees, yet benefiting far more if taking into account the families and surrounding communities. The programme presently operates in Botswana, Kenya, Namibia, Nigeria, Rwanda, South Africa, Tanzania, Uganda, Zambia and Zimbabwe. SWHAP is financed by the Swedish International Development Cooperation Agency, Sida.

== The workplace as arena for HIV/AIDS programmes ==
With an estimated 33 million people infected, the HIV and AIDS pandemic has severe humanitarian consequences as well as enormous effects on households, businesses and societies at large. HIV and AIDS is a workplace issue because it affects workers and their families, enterprises and communities which depend on them. For that reason, the workplace is one arena (out of many) to address the causes and implications of HIV and AIDS. The workplace has a vital role to play in the wider struggle to control the pandemic. Workplace programmes support prevention, expand access to care and ARV treatment, and promote non-discrimination. Globally, the International Labour Organization (ILO) has created Code of Practice on HIV/AIDS and the World of Work, a document that provides practical guidelines for HIV and Aids programmes at enterprise, community, and national levels. SWHAP is one of several initiatives that have been taken to address HIV and AIDS at the workplace level. In particular in Sub-Saharan Africa but also in other countries both employers' federations, trade unions, specialised business coalitions on HIV/AIDS and NGOs have increasingly addressed the issue.

== Programme objectives ==
The overall development goal of SWHAP is for employers and employees at Swedish related workplaces in the Sub-Saharan region to have created effective HIV and AIDS programmes that contribute to the development of a wider private sector response. In order to achieve this, the programme has three primary objectives:

- Workplace programmes have been initiated and improved in an expanded number of companies.
- Extensive experiences from SWHAP workplace programmes and from a broadening network of shared practice have been documented and used by other actors.
- SWHAP has influenced the global HIV and AIDS workplace arena by sharing experience and information in a variety of contexts.

More specific goals include that management and employees should be stimulated to work hand in hand in the fight against HIV and AIDS, that already existing workplace programmes should be supported with fresh resources and that individual companies should be stimulated to increase similar HIV and AIDS activities. The programme also aims at developing an effective network between the participating workplaces. Likewise to spread information about HIV and AIDS to an external audience.

== See also ==
- International Labour Organization (ILO)
- Global Reporting Initiative (GRI)
