= Erika Karp =

- Born: Erika Karp; New York, New York, USA
- Education: Wharton School - University of Pennsylvania; Columbia University
- Occupations: Businesswoman; investment advisor; speaker and writer
- Title: President, Green Alpha Investments

Erika Karp is an American entrepreneur, Wall Street veteran, businesswoman and investment advisor. She is President and partner at investment advisory firm, Green Alpha Investments. Previously, she was founder and chief executive officer of Cornerstone Capital Inc., a wealth management firm known for systematically integrating environmental, social and governance factors into portfolio design and its focus on social impact. In Karp's view, socially responsible investing is a "proxy for quality, innovation and resilience." Karp is a founding Board member of the Sustainability Accounting Standards Board. She was an advisor to the UN Global Compact's LEAD Board Development Program, a member of the World Economic Forum’s Global Agenda Council on Financing and Capital, and an Advisor to the Clinton Global Initiative’s Market-based Approaches track After growing to nearly $2BN in assets, Cornerstone was acquired in 2021 by Pathstone, a $25BN multi-family office, where Karp was named executive managing director and chief impact officer. In 2022, Karp served as a judge for CGI's distinguished Hult Prize, a year-long social entrepreneurship competition that drew 100,000 entrants from 120 countries in search of a $1M prize. In 2014, Cornerstone Capital launched "Sustainable Games: The Business Model Challenge" for university students as a CGI Commitment to Action that awarded a $25,000 grand prize to a new business concept that addressed global challenges.

Prior to launching Cornerstone in August 2013, Karp was managing director and head of Global Sector Research at UBS Investment Bank. She also chaired the UBS Global Investment Review Committee and served on the UBS Securities Research Executive Committee and the Environmental and Human Rights Committee of the UBS Group Executive Board.

== Education and early career ==
Karp received her B.S. in Economics from the University of Pennsylvania’s Wharton School in 1985 and her MBA in Finance from Columbia Business School in 1991.

She began her professional career at IBM’s ROLM Telecom division as an account representative. In 1989, she left IBM to get her MBA. In 1991, Karp became a director of institutional equity sales at Credit Suisse First Boston.

Karp joined UBS Investment Bank in 1999 and was promoted to Managing Director, Global Head of Research Product Management in 2002. She created the UBS Q-Series research initiative to drive investment research from across regions. She also joined the Global Investment Review Committee (GIRC), composed of researchers from around the world. In 2007, Karp was appointed head of Global Sector Research.

== Recognition ==
She was honored in May 2015 by the Greyston Foundation of Yonkers, New York.
