= Emmanuel Faber =

French businessman (born 1964)

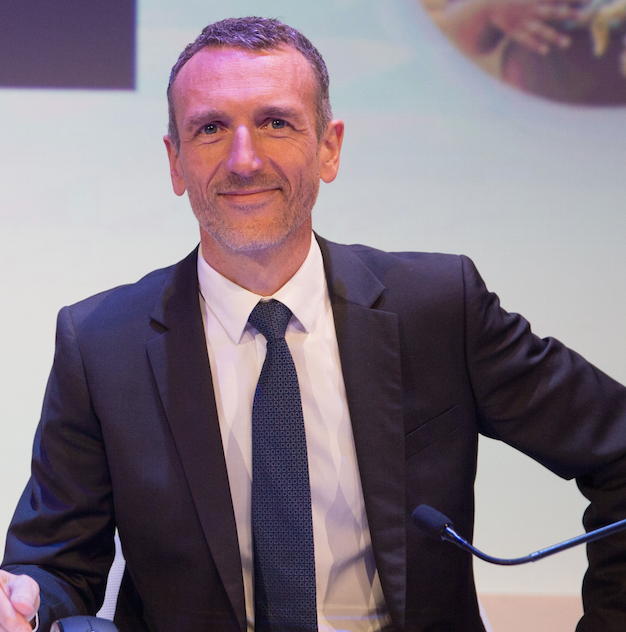
- Born: 22 January 1964 (age 62); Grenoble, France
- Education: HEC Paris
- Occupations: Chair of the International Sustainability Standards Board, former CEO of Danone

Emmanuel Faber (born 22 January 1964) is a French businessman. He was formerly the chief executive officer of Danone, and the chairman of the board of directors. He was subsequently appointed Chair of the International Sustainability Standards Board.

== Biography ==
=== Education and early career ===
Emmanuel Faber passed his baccalaureat in Gap in the early 1980s. Upon graduation from HEC Paris in 1986, Faber began his career at Bain & Company. He then worked for Barings Bank, before joining Legris Industries in 1993 as Administrative and Financial Director. He became general manager in 1996.

=== Career at Danone ===
Faber joined Danone in 1997 as head of Finance, Strategies and Information Systems. In 2000, he became Chief Financial Officer of Danone and a member of the executive committee, appointed as member of the board of directors in 2002. In 2005, he was appointed as vice president, Asia-Pacific region, in charge of operational activities.

From January 2008 to September 2014, he served as Deputy CEO of Danone, responsible for major corporate functions (Finance, Human Resources...), and was named vice-chairman of the board of directors in April 2011.

Invited by Chico Whitaker, he attended the World Social Forum in Belém in 2009.

Faber co-chaired with Martin Hirsch the Action Tank “Business and Poverty”, social experimentation lab, initiated in 2010 by the HEC Paris Chair “Social Business – Enterprise and Poverty”, which gathers companies, civil society organizations and academic spheres together with one common objective: contribute to reducing poverty and exclusion in France.

Between 2011 and 2018, he chaired the Strategic Guidance Committee of IEDES (Institute for the Study of Economic and Social Development) of Paris I Panthéon-Sorbonne University, which amongst others, published the journal Revue Tiers Monde (renamed Revue internationale des études du développement since 2017).

In 2013, at the request of the French Minister of Development, Pascal Canfin, he writes a report with Jay Naidoo on reforming Official Development Assistance : “Mobilizing actors : a new approach to development aid”.

Together with Michael Lonsdale and Eric-Emmanuel Schmitt, he was chosen to be one of the three French sponsors of the World Youth Day 2011.

==== CEO of Danone ====
In October 2014, he became the CEO of Danone, succeeding Franck Riboud. According to Le Figaro, Faber's appointment was favoured by Riboud, as likely to preserve the dual model of pursuing both social and economic values, which had been developed in the 1970s by Riboud's father, Antoine, as head of Danone.

In June 2016 Faber gave the commencement address to graduates of HEC where he spoke of the need for people to come together and bring down walls.

==== Chairman and CEO of Danone ====
In 2017, Emmanuel Faber became chairman of the Board of Directors of Danone in addition to his function of chief executive officer.

That same year, Danone acquired WhiteWave, making the company the world leader in plant-based products, alternatives to animal proteins.

In April 2019, Emmanuel Faber's term of office as chairman and CEO was renewed. In the following months he took leading positions in several global and industry-wide initiatives. On June 17, 2019, he was appointed co-chairman of the Consumer Goods Forum, which seeks to pursue purpose and positive change in the consumer goods industry. In August 2019, on the sidelines of the G7, in Biarritz, Emmanuel Faber was mandated by French president Emmanuel Macron to create a coalition of large global companies committed to the inequalities of opportunity, territory and gender. The initiative was sponsored by the OECD. In September 2019, at the UN Climate Action Summit, he announced the creation of the One Planet Business for Biodiversity (OP2B) business coalition, which aims to protect biodiversity, in particular in the agricultural world.

Faber extended Danone's "multi-stakeholder" model of business, emphasising environmental and social priorities. He championed the idea of includinging a Carbon Adjusted EPS (Earnings Per Share) metric in company reports. In 2020 he won 99% shareholder approval for changing Danone's legal status to an “Entreprise à Mission” to consolidate its social mission. On this he declared they had “toppled one statue of Milton Friedman” (i.e. decisively rejected a profit-only approach).

On March, 14th 2021 he was ousted as chair and CEO by the board of directors.

Following his controversial departure from Danone, Forbes wrote that "Emmanuel Faber will enter history as one of the leading executives promoting stakeholder capitalism and centering core business units around ESG (Environmental, Social, Governance) objectives". Time said his work as Danone's chairman and CEO "had made him a star among environmentalists and climate activists".

==== Compensation at Danone ====
In 2012, his annual compensation was €3.9million.

In 2016, his compensation amounted to 4.82 million euros.

On April 25, 2019, during the general meeting of shareholders of Danone, the resolution concerning the approval of his compensation in 2018 of 2.8 million euros was approved at 98%. He also announced that he would give up his Danone retirement package, which amounts to 1.2 million euros per year, in order to only receive the traditional pension of employees.

In May 2020, in the midst of the COVID-19 crisis, Danone's board of directors accepted Emmanuel Faber's proposal to reduce his fixed compensation by 30% for the rest of 2020 as of July 1, 2019.

=== Career after Danone ===
In October 2021, Faber became a partner at Astanor Ventures, an agritech investment company.

In late 2021, he was appointed chair of the new International Sustainability Standards Board.

=== Personal life ===
Faber is married with three children.

== Bibliography ==
- Main basse sur la cité; éthique et entreprise, Hachette 1992
- Chemins de traverse; vivre l’économie autrement, Éditions Albin Michel 2011, Prix de l'Humanisme Chrétien
- Quand la fragilité change tout (Ouvrage collectif), Albin Michel 2013
