= IFRS Foundation =

Nonprofit accounting organisation

- Purpose: Global corporate reporting standards for the capital markets
- Headquarters: Columbus House 7 Westferry Circus, Canary Wharf, London, E14 4HD UK
- Chair of the Trustees: Erkki Liikanen
- Managing Director: Michel Madelain
- Website: www.ifrs.org
- Formerly called: IASC Foundation

The International Financial Reporting Standards Foundation or IFRS Foundation (sometimes IFRSF) is a nonprofit organization that sets corporate reporting standards for the capital markets globally. Its main objectives include the development and promotion of International Financial Reporting Standards (IFRS Standards), through the International Accounting Standards Board (IASB) for accounting standards and the International Sustainability Standards Board (ISSB) for sustainability-related disclosure standards.

The IFRS Foundation states that its mission is to develop IFRSs that bring transparency, accountability and efficiency to capital markets around the world, and that their work serves the public interest by fostering trust, growth and long-term financial stability in the global economy.

The Foundation is governed by a group of 22 trustees, themselves under the oversight of a "Monitoring Board" of public authorities.

== Background ==
In 2001, the International Accounting Standards Committee (IASC, established 1973) reformed itself under a new dual structure consisting mainly of an independent standard-setting body, the International Accounting Standards Board, and a foundation that appoints and funds the IASB, initially named the IASC Foundation. The IASB assumed accounting standard-setting responsibilities from the IASC on 1 March 2001. The IASC Foundation changed its name to IFRS Foundation on 1 July 2010.

During the first twenty years of activity, the IASB was the IFRS Foundation's dominant standard-setting body. In 2021, the IFRS Foundation created a second standard-setting board, the International Sustainability Standards Board.

== Activities ==
IFRS Accounting

The IASB is an independent group of experts with an appropriate mix of recent practical experience and broad geographical diversity, as required by the IFRS Foundation Constitution.

IASB members are responsible for the development and publication of IFRS Accounting Standards, including the IFRS for SMEs Accounting Standard. The IASB works with the IFRS Interpretations Committee to support consistent application of the Standards.

IFRS Accounting Standards are required for use by more than 140 jurisdictions. The IASB’s work includes continually developing and improving the Standards.

IFRS Sustainability

Responding to the need for consistent and comparable sustainability information to inform economic and investment decisions, in 2021 the IFRS Foundation created the International Sustainability Standards Board (ISSB) which operates alongside the IASB. The ISSB develops IFRS Sustainability Disclosure Standards, designed to deliver a truly global baseline of sustainability disclosures to inform capital markets.

The ISSB builds on the work of market-led investor-focused reporting initiatives, including the Climate Disclosure Standards Board (CDSB), the Task Force on Climate-related Financial Disclosures (TCFD), the Value Reporting Foundation’s Integrated Reporting Framework and industry-based SASB Standards.

The ISSB issued its inaugural Standards, IFRS S1 General Requirements for Disclosure of Sustainability-related Financial Information and IFRS S2 Climate-related Disclosures, in 2023. Jurisdictions around the world are determining how to adopt or use the Standards.

IFRS digital taxonomies

The IFRS digital taxonomies facilitate the reporting of information prepared in accordance with IFRS Standards in a computer-readable, structured data format. They consist of elements that can be used to tag information in financial reports prepared using IFRS Standards. Tagging makes information computer-readable and, therefore, more accessible to investors and other users of electronic company financial reports. The eXtensible Business Reporting Language (XBRL) is used to represent and deliver IFRS Taxonomy content. The IFRS digital taxonomies include the IFRS Accounting Taxonomy, the IFRS Sustainability Disclosure Taxonomy and the SASB Standards Taxonomy.

== Organisation and governance ==
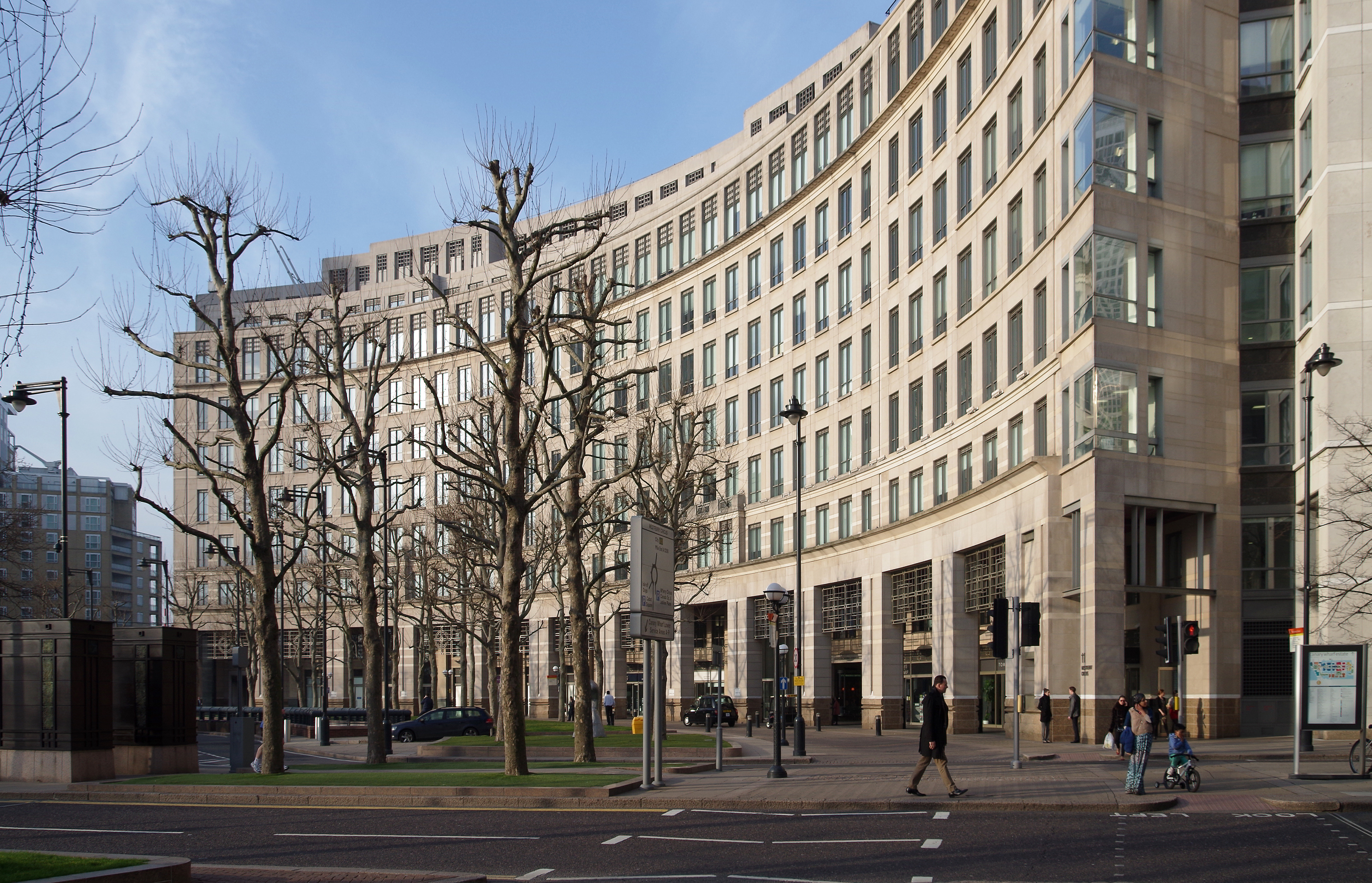
The Columbus Building at 7 Westferry Circus in Canary Wharf has been home to the IFRS Foundation since August 2018

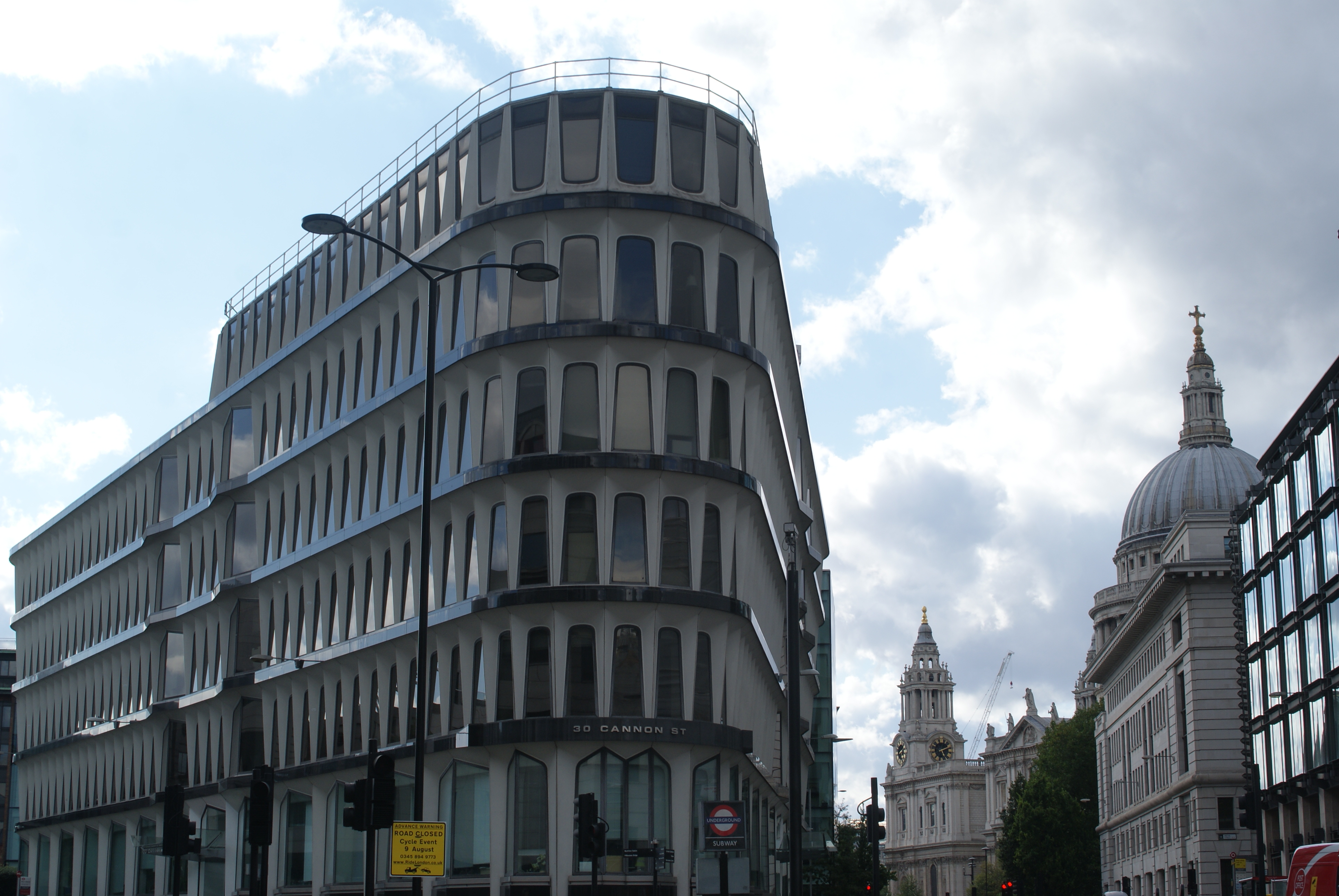
The building at 30 Cannon Street was the previous head office of the IFRS Foundation and IASB, from 2001 to 2018

The IFRS Foundation receives contributed revenue made up of voluntary contributions from jurisdictions, ISSB seed funding, philanthropic grants and contributions from companies. The Foundation receives earned revenue from intellectual property licensing, publications, subscriptions, membership fees, education programmes and conferences.

As of 2024, its managing director is Michel Madelain.

The Foundation is governed by a board of 22 trustees, including, as of 2024:

- Erkki Liikanen (Chair), previously a governor of the International Monetary Fund and a member of the Governing Council of the European Central Bank;
- Teresa Ko (Vice-Chair), Freshfields Bruckhaus Deringer's China Chairman and Founding Partner;
- Maria Theofilaktidis (Vice-Chair), Executive Vice President and Chief Auditor at Scotiabank.

The trustees' responsibilities include IFRS Foundation governance, strategy and funding; due process oversight; and IASB, ISSB, IFRS Interpretations Committee and advisory body appointments. They are accountable to a monitoring board of public authorities, the IFRS Foundation Monitoring Board.

=== List of IFRS Foundation Trustee chairs ===
- Paul Volcker (2000–January 2006)
- Tommaso Padoa-Schioppa (January–May 2006)
- Philip A. Laskawy (May 2006–December 2007)
- Gerrit Zalm (December 2007–June 2010)
- Tommaso Padoa-Schioppa (June–December 2010)
- Robert R. Glauber and Tsuguoki Fujinuma (acting co-chairs, December 2010–December 2011)
- Michel Prada (December 2011–October 2018)
- Erkki Liikanen (October 2018–present)

== See also ==
- Financial Accounting Foundation in the United States
