= Carbon accounting =

Processes used to measure emissions of carbon dioxide equivalents

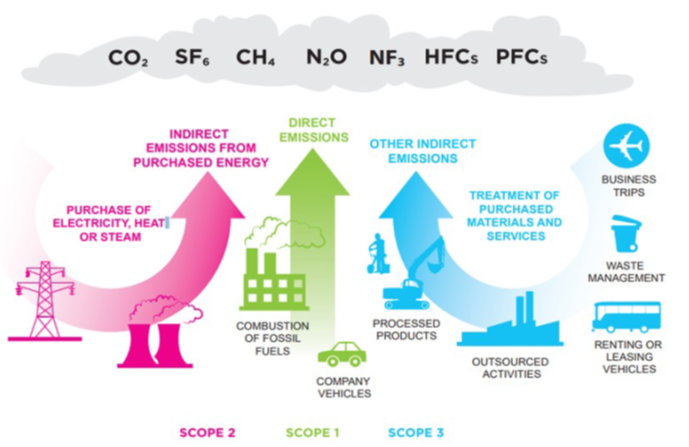
Depiction of carbon accounting using the WRI-Greenhouse Gas Protocol classification of emissions into three categories: Scope 1, 2, and 3. Additional downstream Scope 3 sources are shown on WRI's website.

Carbon accounting, also called greenhouse gas accounting or GHG accounting, is a framework of methods to measure and track how much greenhouse gas (GHG) an organization emits. It can also be used to track projects or actions to reduce emissions in sectors such as forestry or renewable energy. Corporations, cities and other groups use these techniques to help limit climate change. Organizations will often set an emissions baseline, create targets for reducing emissions, and track progress towards them. The accounting methods enable them to do this in a more consistent and transparent manner.

The main reasons for GHG accounting are to address social responsibility concerns or meet legal requirements. Public rankings of companies, financial due diligence and potential cost savings are other reasons. GHG accounting methods help investors better understand the climate risks of companies they invest in. They also help with net zero emission goals of corporations or communities. Many governments around the world require various forms of reporting. There is some evidence that programs that require GHG accounting help to lower emissions. Markets for buying and selling carbon credits depend on accurate measurement of emissions and emission reductions. These techniques can help to understand the impacts of specific products and services. They do this by quantifying their GHG emissions throughout their lifecycle (carbon footprint).

These techniques can be used at different scales, from those of companies and cities, to the greenhouse gas inventories of entire nations. They require measurements, calculations and estimates. A variety of standards and guidelines can apply, including the Greenhouse Gas Protocol and ISO 14064. These usually group the emissions into three categories. The Scope 1 category includes the direct emissions from an organization's facilities. Scope 2 includes the emissions from energy purchased by the organization. Scope 3 includes other indirect emissions, such as those from suppliers and from the use of the organization's products.

There are a number of challenges in creating accurate accounts of greenhouse gas emissions. Scope 3 emissions, in particular, can be difficult to estimate. For example, problems with additionality and double counting issues can affect the credibility of carbon offset schemes. Accuracy checks on accounting reports from companies and projects are important. Organizations like Climate Trace are now able to check reports against actual emissions via the use of satellite imagery and AI techniques.

== Origins ==
Initial efforts to create greenhouse gas (GHG) accounting methods were largely at the national level. In 1995, the United Nations climate program required developed countries to report annually on their emissions from six types of industry. Two years later, the Kyoto protocol defined the greenhouse gases that are the focus of today's accounting methods. These are carbon dioxide (CO_{2}), methane (CH_{4}), nitrous oxide, sulfur hexafluoride, nitrogen trifluoride, hydrofluorocarbons and perfluorocarbons. These actions raised awareness about the importance of accurate GHG emission estimates.

In 1998 the World Resources Institute (WRI) and World Business Council for Sustainable Development (WBCSD) began work to develop a protocol to support this goal. They published the first version of Greenhouse Gas Protocol in September 2001. It establishes a "comprehensive, global, standardized framework for measuring and managing emissions from private and public sector operations, value chains, products, cities, and policies". The corporate protocol divides an organization's emissions into three categories. Scope 1 covers direct emissions from an organization's facilities. Scope 2 covers emissions from generating electricity purchased by the organization. Scope 3 covers other indirect emissions.

Other initiatives since then have helped promote corporate and community participation in GHG accounting. The Carbon Disclosure Project (CDP) began in the UK in 2002, and is now a multinational group, with thousands of companies disclosing their GHG emissions. The Science Based Targets Initiative (SBTi) formed in 2015 as a collaboration between CDP, WRI, the World Wide Fund for Nature (WWF), and the United Nations Global Compact (UNGC). Its goal is to establish science-based environmental target setting as a standard corporate practice.

Since the 2015 Paris Agreement there has been an increased focus on standards for financial risk from GHG emissions. The Task Force on Climate Related Financial Disclosures (TCFD) formed as a follow-up to the Paris Agreement. It established a framework of recommendations on the types of information that companies should disclose to investors, lenders, and insurance underwriters. More recently, governments such as the EU and US have developed regulations that cover corporate financial disclosure requirements and the use of accounting protocols to meet them.

Participation in greenhouse gas accounting and reporting has grown significantly over time. In 2020, 81% of S&P 500 companies reported Scope 1 and Scope 2 emissions. Globally, over 22,000 companies disclosed data to CDP in 2022.

== Drivers ==
=== Internal company drivers ===
A variety of business incentives drive corporate carbon accounting. These include rankings alongside other companies, managing climate change related risks, investment due diligence, shareholder and stakeholder outreach, staff engagement, and energy cost savings. Accounting for greenhouse gas emissions is often seen as a standard practice for business.

=== Governmental requirements ===
Legal requirements provide another type of driver. These are usually created through specific laws on reporting, or within broader environmental programs. Emissions trading markets also depend on accounting and reporting protocols. In 2015 more than 40 countries had some type of reporting requirement in place.

The EU's Corporate Sustainability Reporting Directive (CSRD) is part of the European Green Deal. It is intended to make EU countries carbon neutral by 2050. This directive will require many large companies and companies with securities listed on EU-regulated markets to disclose a broad array of ESG information, including GHG emissions. The UK's Environmental Reporting Guidelines update and clarify requirements in earlier laws that required companies to report information on GHG emissions. In the US the Greenhouse Gas Reporting Program (GHGRP) requires facility (as opposed to corporate) based reporting of GHG emissions from large industrial facilities. The program covers a total of 41 industrial categories.

Recent regulations are also coming from agencies that traditionally have had a financial focus. The US Security Exchange Commission (SEC) proposed a rule in 2022 to require all public companies, regardless of size, to report Scope 1 and Scope 2 emissions. Larger companies would be required to disclose Scope 3 emissions only if they are material to the company, or if the company has set an emissions target that includes Scope 3. Japan's Financial Services Agency's (FSA) also issued rules in 2022 that require financial disclosure of climate related information. These may cover around 4,000 companies, including those listed on the Tokyo Stock Exchange.

Government procurement requirements have also begun to incorporate GHG reporting requirements. In 2022 both the US and the UK governments issued executive type orders that require this practice.

Emission trading schemes in various countries also play a role in promoting GHG accounting, as do international carbon offset programs. The European Union Emissions Trading System (EU ETS) is a cap-and-trade system where a limit is placed on the right to emit specified pollutants over an area, and companies can trade emission rights within that area. EU ETS is the second largest trading system in the world after the Chinese national carbon trading scheme, covering over 40% of European GHG emissions. Greenhouse Gas Protocol is cited in its guidance documents. California's cap-and-trade program operates along similar principles. International offset programs also contain requirements for quantifying emission reductions from specific project. The CDM has a detailed set of monitoring, reporting, and verification procedures, as does the Reducing Emissions from Deforestation and Forest Degradation (REDD+) program. As of 2022, similar procedures to document project reductions under Article 6 of the Paris agreement are yet to be worked out .

=== Non-governmental organization programs ===
Many NGOs have developed programs that both promote GHG accounting and reporting, and help define its features. The Carbon Disclosure project allows a range of protocols for reporting to it. Most companies report GHG emissions to CDP using Greenhouse Gas Protocol or a protocol based on it. The Science Based Targets initiative cites Greenhouse Gas Protocol guidance as part of its criteria and recommendations. Similarly, the TCFD cites Greenhouse Gas Protocol in its recommended metrics and targets.

== Frameworks and standards ==
Many of today's carbon accounting standards have incorporated principles from the 2006 guidelines for greenhouse gas inventories that were created by the Intergovernmental Panel on Climate Change (IPCC). Those most consistently applied include transparency, accuracy, consistency, and completeness. The IPCC principle of comparability, for example amongst organizations, is less widely applied, though techniques to support this goal are mentioned throughout Greenhouse Gas Protocol's corporate standard.

These standards typically cover the greenhouse gases first regulated under the Kyoto Protocol. They operate in two distinct manners. Attributional accounting allocates emissions to specific organizations or products, and measures and tracks them over time. Consequential accounting methods measure the difference from a specific change, like a GHG reduction project.

=== Corporate/local government standards ===
Corporations and facilities use a variety of methods to track and report GHG emissions. These include those from Greenhouse Gas Protocol, the Task Force on Climate-Related Financial Disclosure, the Sustainability Accounting Standards Board, the Global Reporting Initiative, the Climate Disclosure Standards Board, the Climate Registry, as well as several industry specific organizations. CDP lists an even broader set of acceptable methods for reporting in its guidance. Standards for cities and communities include the Global Protocol for Community Scale Greenhouse Gas Inventories and the ICLEI U.S. Community Protocol. This covers cities and communities in the US.

==== Greenhouse Gas Protocol ====
GHG Protocol is a group of standards that are the most common in GHG accounting. These standards reflect a number of accounting principles, including relevance, completeness, consistency, transparency, and accuracy. The standards divide emissions into three scopes.

Scope 1 covers all direct GHG emissions within a corporate boundary (owned or controlled by a company). It includes fuel combustion, company vehicles and fugitive emissions.

Scope 2 covers indirect GHG emissions from consumption of purchased electricity, heat, cooling or steam. As of 2010, at least one third of global GHG emissions are Scope 2.

Scope 3 emission sources include emissions from suppliers and product users (also known as the "value chain"). Transportation of goods, and other indirect emissions are also part of this scope. Scope 3 emissions often represent the largest source of corporate greenhouse gas emissions, for example the use of oil sold by Aramco. These were estimated to represent 75% of all emissions reported to the Carbon Disclosure Project, though that percentage varies widely amongst business sectors. In 2022 about 30% of US companies reported Scope 3 emissions. However, the International Sustainability Standards Board is developing a recommendation that Scope 3 emissions be included as part of all GHG reporting. There are 15 Scope 3 categories. Examples include goods or services an organization purchases, employee commuting, and the use of sold products. Not every category is relevant to all organizations.

WRI is currently developing a Land Sector and Removals Standard for its corporate reporting guidelines. This will include emissions and removals from land management and land use change; biogenic products; and carbon dioxide removal technologies. Furthermore, GHG Protocol is currently (as of 2024) updating its corporate standards and guidelines, including the Corporate Standard, Scope 2 Guidance, and the Scope 3 Standard.

==== ISO 14064 ====
The International Organization for Standardization (ISO) published ISO 14064 standards for greenhouse gas accounting and verification in 2006. ISO, WRI and WBCSD worked together to ensure consistency amongst the ISO and Greenhouse Gas Protocol standards. ISO 14064 is based on Greenhouse Gas Protocol. Part 1 (ISO 14064-1:2006) specifies principles and requirements for estimating and reporting GHG emissions and removals. Part 3 (ISO 14064-3:2006) provides guidance for conducting and managing the verification of GHG reporting.

==== PAS 2060 ====
PAS 2060 is a standard that describes how organizations can demonstrate carbon neutrality. It was developed by the British Standards Institute and published in 2010. Under PAS 2060 GHG estimates should include 100% of Scope 1 and Scope 2 emissions, plus all Scope 3 emissions that contribute more than 1% of the total footprint. Organizations must also develop a Carbon Management Plan which contains a public commitment to carbon neutrality along with a reduction strategy. This strategy should include a time scale for achieving neutrality, specific targets for reductions, how those reductions will be achieved and how residual emissions will be offset.

==== EPA Greenhouse Gas Reporting Program ====
The United States Environmental Protection Agency (EPA)'s Greenhouse Gas Reporting Program (GHGRP) requires facility and supplier based reporting for many categories of emissions sources. The program includes guidelines for how emissions are to be estimated and reported. Facilities are required to report (1) combustion emissions resulting from burning fossil fuels or biomass (such as wood or landfill gas); and (2) other emissions from industrial processes, such as chemical reactions from iron and steelmaking, cement, or petrochemicals. Categories of suppliers that must report include coal and natural gas, petroleum products, as well as suppliers of CO_{2} and other industrial GHGs. Monitoring methodologies are more specific than GHG Protocol or ISO 14064, and require the use of continuous monitoring systems, mass balance calculations, or default emission factors. EPA uses the facility-level and supplier data to help prepare the annual Inventory of U.S. Greenhouse Gas Emissions and Sinks, which is submitted to the United Nations.

==== Task Force on Climate-related Financial Disclosures ====
Created in 2015, the Task Force on Climate Related Financial Disclosures (TCFD) provides information to investors about what companies are doing to mitigate the risks of climate change. TCFD's disclosure standard for companies covers four thematic areas. These are governance, strategy, risk management, and metrics and targets. There are also several principles TCFD emphasizes in its guidance. Disclosures should be representative of relevant information; specific and complete; as well as clear, balanced, and understandable. In addition, estimates also need to be consistent over time; comparable amongst companies within a sector industry or portfolio; reliable, verifiable, and objective; and timely. The metrics and targets portion of the standard requires measurement and disclosure methods based on GHG Protocol. The TCFD's standard specifies that companies should disclose all Scope 1 and 2 emissions regardless of their material impacts on the company. Scope 3 emission reporting is dependent on whether they are "material", but TCFD recommends they be included.

==== Protocols for cities/communities ====
The Global Protocol for Community-Scale Greenhouse Gas Inventories (GPC) is the result of a collaborative effort between the GHG Protocol at World Resources Institute (WRI), C40 Cities Climate Leadership Group (C40), and Local Governments for Sustainability (ICLEI). It requires a community to first identify the inventory boundary, such as an administrative boundary for a city or county. The protocol focuses on six main activity sectors. These are stationary energy; transportation; waste; industrial processes and product use; agriculture, forestry and other land use. Emissions occurring outside the geographic boundary that are a result of a jurisdiction's activities are also included. To distinguish between emissions that occur within a city boundary and outside, the protocol uses the Scope 1, 2 and 3 definitions in GHG Protocol. Communities report emissions by gas, scope, sector and subsector using two options. One is a framework that reflects a more traditional Scope 1, 2, and 3 assessment. Another is more focused on activities taking place within that community, and excludes categories such as waste generated outside of it.

The U.S. Community Protocol (developed by ICLEI–Local Governments for Sustainability USA) is intended to support multiple goals that cities and communities may have in reducing GHG emissions. These include: climate action planning, highlighting climate change accountability and leadership, tracking GHG emissions performance over time, and encouraging community action. The protocol focuses on specific emission sources and activities to characterize emissions rather than using a Scope 1, 2 and 3 framework, though the overall coverage is similar. The guidance suggests communities consider the stories they wish to convey about community emissions, and what reporting methods will help tell those stories. Five basic emissions generating activities are emphasized. These are: use of electricity by the community; use of fuel in residential and commercial stationary combustion equipment; on-road passenger and freight motor vehicle travel; use of energy in drinking water and wastewater treatment and distribution; and generation of solid waste by the community. Reporting guidance covers a variety of approaches, and organizations can include one or more of them. These include GHG activities and sources over which a local government has significant influence; GHG activities of community interest; household consumption inventories; and an inventory that incorporates the GHG emissions (and removals) from land use. An independent evaluation of inventories that have been developed using this protocol has questioned whether they capture the full range of Scope 1 sources within their jurisdictions.

Consumption-based methods, such as PAS 2070, provide another perspective on community greenhouse gas emissions. These clarify the difference between GHG emissions from sources within a community boundary, and GHG emissions from goods and services that are used by residents, but produced outside the community. These consumption-based estimates can often be much greater than those from sources solely within a community.

=== Product accounting standards ===
Product accounting methods are part of a broader set of Life Cycle Assessment approaches that include Product Carbon Footprints. These focus on the single issue of climate change. They can be used for either a product or a service. Related standards include ISO 14067, PAS 2050, and GHG Protocol Product Standard.

GHG Protocol for Products builds on the framework of requirements in the ISO 14040 and PAS 2050 standards. It is similar to GHG Protocol Scope 3, but focused on life cycle/value chain impacts for a specific product. The same five accounting principles apply as with the Corporate Standard. Steps include setting business goals, defining analysis boundaries, calculating results, analyzing uncertainties, and reporting. Boundaries for final products are required to include the complete cradle-to-grave life cycle.

The ISO 14067 standard builds largely on other existing ISO standards for LCA. Steps include goal and scope definition, inventory analysis, impact assessment, interpretation, and reporting. For ISO 14067, the life cycle stages that need to be studied in the LCA are defined by a variety of system boundaries. Cradle-to-grave includes the emissions and removals generated during the full life of cycle of the product. Cradle-to-gate includes the emissions and removals up to where the product leaves the organization. Gate-to-gate includes the emissions and removals that arise in the supply chain.

Product footprint analysis can provide insight into GHG contributions throughout the value chain. On average, 45% of total value chain emissions arise upstream in the supply chain, 23% during the company's direct operations, and 32% downstream.

=== Project accounting standards ===
Project accounting standards and protocols are typically used to ensure the "environmental integrity" of projects designed to reduce GHG emissions and generate carbon offsets. They support both compliance type programs as well as voluntary markets. Accounting rules cover areas such as monitoring, reporting, and verification, and are designed to ensure that the emission reduction estimates for a project are accurate. Greenhouse Gas Protocol and ISO have specific protocols to accomplish this. Certification organizations also have program requirements can cover project eligibility, certification, and other aspects. Verified Carbon Standard, the Gold Standard, Climate Action Reserve and the American Carbon Registry are among the leading certification organizations doing this work. Project developers, brokers, auditors, and buyers are the other main types of participants.

Several principles help ensure the environmental integrity of carbon offset projects that rely on this family of standards. One key principle is additionality. This depends on whether the project would occur anyway without the funds raised by selling carbon offset credits. For instance, a project would not be considered additional if it is already financially viable due to energy or other cost savings. Similarly, if it would normally be done to meet an environmental law or regulation, it would not be additional. Various kinds of analyses can help evaluate this aspect of a project, though the results are often subjective.

Projects are also judged based on the permanence of reductions over various time horizons. This is important in areas such as forestry projects. They should also be designed to avoid double-counting, where reductions are claimed by more than one organization. Avoiding overestimation of emission reductions is another consideration. Some protocols and standards look to ensure that projects produce social and environmental co-benefits, in addition to emission reductions from the project itself.

==== ISO 14064 Part 2 ====
This standard provides guidance for quantification, monitoring and reporting of GHG reduction activities or removal enhancements. It includes requirements for planning a GHG project, as well as identifying and selecting GHG sources and sinks. It also covers various aspects of GHG project performance.

==== GHG Protocol standards for projects and policies ====
The accounting principles in the GHG Protocol for Project Accounting include relevance, completeness, consistency, transparency, accuracy and conservativeness. Like the ISO standard, the protocol's focus is on core accounting principles and impact quantification, rather than the programmatic and transactional aspects of carbon credits. The protocol gives general guidance on applying additionality and uncertainty principles, but does not specifically require them. WRI and WBCSD have also developed additional guidance documents for projects in the land use, forestry, and electric grid sectors. GHG Protocol Policy and Action Standard has similar accounting principles, but these are applied to general programs and policies designed to reduce GHGs.

==== Verified Carbon Standard (VERRA) ====
VERRA was developed in 2005, and is a widely used voluntary carbon standard. It uses accounting principles based on ISO 14064 Part 2, which are the same as the GHG protocol principles described above. Allowable projects under VERRA include energy, transport, waste, and forestry. There are also specific methodologies for REDD+ projects. Verra has additional criteria to avoid double counting, as well as requirements for additionality. Negative impacts on sustainable development in the local community are prohibited. Project monitoring is based on CDM standards.

==== Gold Standard ====
The Gold Standard was developed in 2003 by the World Wide Fund for Nature (WWF) in consultation with an independent Standards Advisory Board. Projects are open to any non-government, community-based organization. Allowable project categories include renewable energy supply, energy efficiency, afforestation/reforestation, and agriculture (the latter can be difficult - for example soil carbon measurements are depth sensitive). The program's focus includes the promotion of Sustainable Developments Goals. Projects must meet at least three of those goals, in addition to reducing GHG emissions. Projects must also make a net-positive contribution to the economic, environmental and social welfare of the local population. Program monitoring requirements help determine this. The standard certifies additionality based on an evaluation of financial viability or the institutional barriers that a project faces. In some cases additionality is assumed based on the type of project. There are also screens for double counting.

== Other applications ==
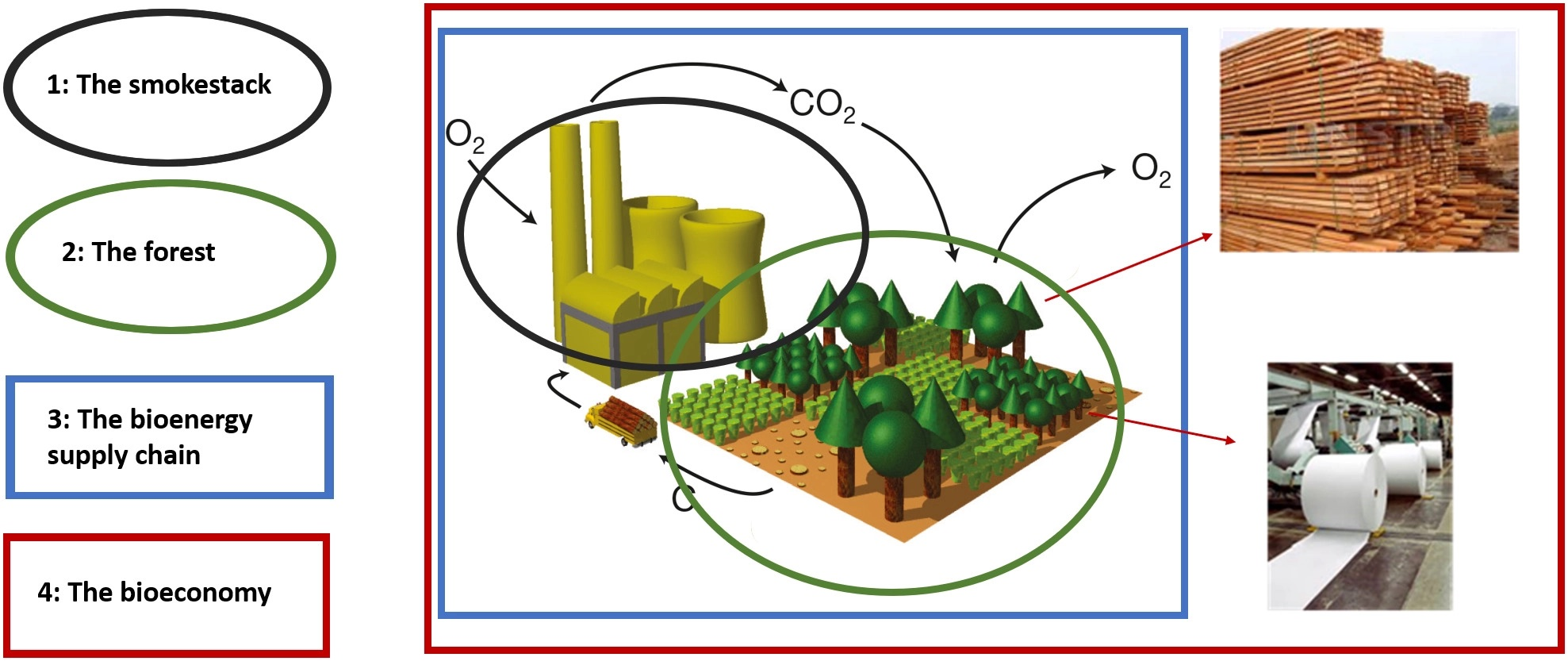
Example for carbon accounting: Bioenergy system boundaries for carbon accounting

In addition to the uses described above, GHG accounting is used in other settings, both regulatory and voluntary.

=== Renewable energy credits ===
Renewable Energy Certificates (REC) or Guarantees of Origin (GO) document the fact that one megawatt-hour of electricity is generated and supplied to the electrical grid through the use of renewable energy resources. RECs are now being utilized around the world and are becoming more prevalent. The United Kingdom (U.K.) has used renewable obligation certificates since 2002 in order to ensure compliance with the U.K. Renewables Obligation. In the European Union, Guarantees of Origin are used to describe this practice. Australia has used RECs since 2001. More recently, India set up a REC market.

In the context of GHG accounting, RECs are often used to adjust estimated Scope 2 emissions. In a typical case, a company would calculate its Scope 2 emissions using its electricity consumption and a grid emissions factor. Companies that purchase RECs can use them to lower the average emissions factors included in their inventories. This allows them to report lower emissions even while their real electricity consumption stays the same, as the use of a REC does not necessarily mean additional renewable power has been brought to the grid. This lack of "additionality" has led to criticism regarding the use of RECs in Scope 2 emission accounting.

=== National emissions inventories ===
Data from facility level accounting can improve the overall quality and accuracy of national inventories by providing quality control checks on inventory estimates and through improved emissions factors. This depends in part on what percentage of the sector's emissions the available data covers. In some cases, aggregated facility level data can also be used to update or modify inventory results for certain sectors.

=== Net Zero goals and GHG disclosure ===
The Net Zero concept emerged from the Paris Agreement, and has become a feature of both national laws and numerous corporate goals. Race to Zero was developed in 2019 to encourage private companies and sub-national governments to commit to net zero emissions by 2050 at the latest. SBTI created a Net Zero program in 2021 to assist organizations in making this transition. That standard includes restrictions on the use of carbon removals to reach net zero goals. Accurate and comprehensive GHG accounting is considered a key element of for Net Zero transition plans, including the use of protocols such as GHG Corporate Standard.

The CDP (formerly the Carbon Disclosure Project) is an international NGO that helps companies and cities disclose their environmental impact. It aims to make corporate accounting and reporting a business norm, and drive GHG disclosure, insight, and action. In 2021, over 14,000 organizations disclosed their environmental information through CDP. CDP's 2022 questionnaire on transition plans includes specific requirements for describing Scope 1, 2 and 3 emissions.

== Effectiveness ==
With the growth of GHG reporting, more information is now available to provide rankings of GHG emissions from companies and cities. News media have used these rankings to bring attention to those companies. In some instances, such as media coverage of the 2017 "Carbon Majors" report by CDP, this particular use of disclosure was shown to be misleading.

Understanding the overall impacts of GHG reporting in reducing an organization's emissions can be difficult. A number of studies have looked at changes in GHG emissions that occur after GHG reporting begins. There is evidence from related programs that self reporting lowers emissions. EPA's Toxic Release inventory is one such example. It has been shown to have had a significant effect in reducing emissions of chemicals once facilities are required to disclose that information.

Recent studies focusing on changes in GHG emissions that result from GHG reporting have shown mixed results. Voluntary carbon reporting itself has often been shown to be ineffective in reducing GHG emissions. However, when looking at the additional impact of programs that require GHG emission reporting, studies have shown more of an effect. A recent study of UK reporting requirements showed that they do result in reduced corporate GHG emissions. Analyses of EPA's Greenhouse Gas Reporting Program found that when firms are required to disclose their facility level emissions, it can also lead to a reduction in GHG intensity of their operations, though the evidence for reductions in absolute emissions is less clear. One suggestion for the effects of specific GHG reporting requirements is that they inhibit the ability of companies to portray their emissions in a flattering way, and so are forced to actually make changes that lower GHG emissions.

There are some confounding factors involved in this research. These include whether or not the studies are done in places where there is emissions trading, such as the EU ETS. Another variable is whether or not the requirements focus on larger companies that emit more GHGs. In addition, firms that are required to report on facility emissions appear to focus on controlling emissions for their affected facilities, but to then transfer emissions to nonreporting facilities that they also control.

== Limitations ==
GHG accounting faces a number of challenges and critical assessments. One category involves how best to determine organizational boundaries and identify inputs and outputs most relevant to emissions. Problems also arise with characterizing uncertainty in emission estimates, and identifying what information materially affects a company's operations, and therefore needs reporting. The use of alternate standards can affect comparability across organizations, as can lack of third party verification.

Accurate reporting of Scope 3 emissions is a particular challenge. These emissions can be several times greater than Scope 1 and 2 emissions. In some cases these are reported inconsistently, depending on whom they are reported to. Lack of high-quality data can also affect the accuracy of Scope 3 estimates for particular categories of upstream and downstream sources that influence Scope 3 estimates. Companies may neglect to include key Scope 3 categories when reporting to organizations such as CDP. As of 2020, only 18% of the constituents of MSCI's global security index reported Scope 3 emissions. There is also evidence that many of the high rate emitters either under-report or do not report at all. Even Scope 3 data from companies that are then analyzed and summarized by third party auditing firms tend to be highly inconsistent. There are also concerns over double counting of Scope 3 emissions as companies work with their value chain partners. Despite the uncertainty of these numbers, Scope 3 estimates are seen by many companies as important for decision making purposes. They are also considered an important tool for investors to better understand climate related risks in their portfolio.

Many companies may also inaccurately estimate the climate benefits of their products. This can happen by failing to account for a product's full life cycle, using inappropriate comparisons, conflating market size with product use, and cherry picking results to skew a portfolio towards those products that have less impacts.

Double counting of GHG emissions or benefits can discredit the information value. Problems created by skewed data collection methods can affect companies, GHG reduction projects, investors, those involved in carbon credits/offsets, and regulatory agencies. It can also distort perceptions of progress in reducing emissions. In corporate accounting, double-counting can reach about 30-40% of emissions in institutional portfolios. However, some accounting methods can still provide organizations with information on how to reduce real emissions.

In trading schemes and regulatory/inventory schemes, double counting presents other problems. For Renewable Energy Certificates, double counting can falsely exaggerate claims about using renewable resources. Double counting of emission reductions can also produce disincentives to use international carbon trading schemes, such as the CDM. Trading participants may be reluctant to purchase credits if the credits are already used by other entities. Double counting of emission reductions could increase the global costs of reducing GHG emissions. It can also make mitigation pledges less comparable. This, in turn, can affect the credibility of the international climate control efforts, and make it more difficult to reach agreements on how to affect the drivers of climate change. Estimating the extent of double counting is difficult. Estimates depend in part on actions taken at various levels to prevent double counting.

In addition to double counting, carbon offsets face a variety of other challenges that affect the quality of the offset. These include additionality, overestimation, and permanence of offsets. News stories in 2021 and 2022 have criticized nature-based carbon offsets, the REDD+ program, and certification organizations. The REDD+ program in particular has been criticized as having a poor history of accounting for its results. However, positive aspects of these programs have also been highlighted.

== Current trends ==
=== Standards alignment and interoperability ===
As mentioned in the "Frameworks and standards" section, organizations can use a variety of accounting methods and approaches to estimate and report on GHG emissions. Some standards, such as GHG protocol, have been in existence for more than two decades. Yet efforts continue to better align these standards and create more interoperability among them. For example, the International Sustainability Standards Board (ISSB) has also been established to develop a global baseline of sustainability standards that it hopes will help harmonize sustainability disclosure requirements. In 2022, the ISSB established a working group to enhance compatibility among various corporate disclosure requirements, including the EU Corporate Sustainability Reporting Directive and SEC's 2022 disclosure rule.

Although these are all based on the broader elements of the TCFD framework and GHG protocol, they differ in a variety of ways. For example, when the SEC proposal uses the term "material", it is only describing the extent to which reporting on emissions could directly impact a company financially. The CSRD proposal uses a "double materiality" criterion, which takes into consideration impacts on both a company and the public at large. It remains to be seen how these types of issues will be reconciled.

=== Support for net zero goals ===
There is also an increased focus on aligning GHG accounting standards with net zero goals and claims. SBTi launched a net zero corporate standard in 2021. Companies that pledge to this standard need to have both short term targets as well as targets for 2050. ISO also has a new standard under development, ISO 14068, that supports net zero goals. It is expected to build on the original net neutrality standard, PAS 2060.

=== Managing Scope 3 emissions ===
For the average company, Scope 3 emissions estimates are significantly higher than the level of direct emissions. NGOs such as SBTI are working to address this. If a company's Scope 3 emissions are more than 40% of their total, that company needs a Scope 3 target to meet SBTi standards. However, only about a third of suppliers reporting to CDP as part of their Global Supply Chain program describe specific climate targets.

In some cases, companies are working with their suppliers to set goals for measuring and reducing emission. Other efforts include developing supplier codes of conduct for specific business sectors. Companies may also target specific offset projects within their own Scope 3 supply chains. Government agencies have developed guidance on how to engage with suppliers, including basic questionnaires about Scope 1, 2 and 3 emissions.

=== Voluntary carbon markets ===
The voluntary market is expected to grow tremendously over the next few decades. To date, the Scope 1-3 emissions of the 54 Global Fortune 500 companies that committed to net zero by 2050 or earlier is about 2.5 gigatons of CO_{2} equivalent. By comparison, the volume of credits traded on the voluntary carbon market was about 300 megatons as of 2021. Global demand for carbon credits could increase up to 15 times by 2030 and 100 times by 2050.

=== Alternative validation approaches ===
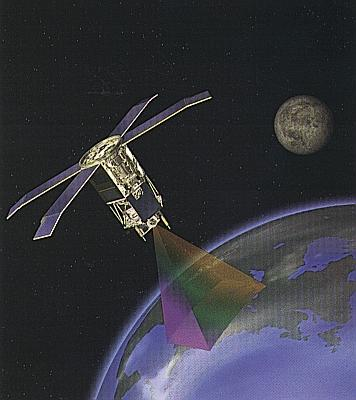
SeaStar satellite. Similar satellites, such as the Sentinel 5P, helps detect methane leaks. Data from sources like the Copernicus Programme are free, and can help validate organisations' carbon accounting results.

Techniques are being developed to use other emission data sets to validate GHG accounting methods. Project Vulcan collects data from a large number of publicly available data sources for the United States such as pollution reporting, energy statistics, power plant stack monitoring, and traffic counts. Using these data, US cities have been found to often underestimate their emissions. Methods that link emissions data with atmospheric measurements can help improve city inventories.

Climate Trace is an independent organization that improves monitoring, reporting and verification (MRV) by publishing point sources of carbon dioxide and methane in near-real-time. Climate Trace has found underreporting of emissions from the oil and gas sector.

== See also ==
- Carbon emission trading
- Carbon footprint
- Clean Development Mechanism
- Cooperative mechanisms under Article 6 of the Paris Agreement
- European Union Emissions Trading System
- Flexible mechanisms
- Greenhouse gas inventory
- Greenhouse gas monitoring
- Regulation of greenhouse gases under the Clean Air Act
