= Global Reporting Initiative =

International standards organization

GRI
- Founded: 1997 Boston, United States
- Type: Non-governmental organization
- Purpose: Sustainability reporting
- Headquarters: Amsterdam, Netherlands
- Region served: Worldwide
- Chief Executive Officer: Robin Hodess
- Deputy Chief Executive: NA
- Chief Financial Officer: NA
- Main organ: Secretariat (administrative office) elected by the annual general meeting
- Affiliations: OECD, UNEP, United Nations Global Compact, ISO
- Website: www.globalreporting.org
- Formerly called: Global Reporting Initiative

The Global Reporting Initiative (GRI) is an international independent standards organization that develops frameworks for sustainability reporting. Its standards are used by businesses, governments, and other organizations to report on environmental, social, and governance (ESG) impacts, including issues such as climate change, human rights, and corruption.

Founded in 1997 by the non-profit organizations Ceres and Tellus Institute, GRI released its first sustainability reporting guidelines in 2000. The organization is headquartered in Amsterdam, Netherlands, and collaborates with the United Nations Environment Programme (UNEP).

The GRI Standards are among the most widely used sustainability reporting standards in the world and are used by thousands of organizations across more than 100 countries. According to a survey by KPMG, as of 2022, 78% of the world's 250 largest companies by revenue and 68% of the top 100 companies surveyed across 58 countries used GRI Standards in their sustainability reporting.

The standards are developed by the Global Sustainability Standards Board (GSSB) and are organized into Universal Standards, Sector Standards, and Topic Standards. The revised Universal Standards published in 2021 took effect for reporting in January 2023.

== History ==
The Global Reporting Initiative was developed in 1997 by the United States–based non-profits Ceres (formerly the Coalition for Environmentally Responsible Economies) and consulting agency Tellus Institute. Key individuals were Ceres President Bob Massie and Allen L. White of Tellus. Other influential thinkers who were board members of Ceres included Joan Bavaria of the Social Investment Forum (SIF), Alica Gravitz of Co-op America and Paul Freundlich of the US-based Fair Trade Foundation. The initiative soon gained support from the United Nations Environment Programme (UNEP).

GRI released an "exposure draft" version of the Sustainability Reporting Guidelines in 1999, and the first full version in June 2000. Work immediately began on a second version which was released at the World Summit for Sustainable Development in Johannesburg in August 2002—where the organization and the guidelines were also referred to in the Plan of Implementation signed by all attending member states.

As early as 2001, GRI expressed its intention to institutionalize the organization with a headquarters in Europe. In April 2002, GRI was inaugurated as an independent organization in a ceremony hosted at the UN headquarters in New York. Its mission was to provide “stewardship of the Guidelines through their continuous enhancement and dissemination (GRI 2000 Guidelines).” Engineering consultancy DHV (now Royal HaskoningDHV) expressed a strong interest in the initiative following the publication of the draft guidelines, translating them into Dutch and holding its first seminar on disclosing and reporting on 7 December 1999. Influential figures in the Dutch adoption of GRI include Nancy Kamp-Roelands, Johan Piet and Piet Sprengers. DHV approached then-CEO Allen White and set up meetings with the Dutch government. By April 2002, GRI had decided to settle in Amsterdam, Netherlands where it subsequently incorporated as a non-profit organization and a Collaborating Centre of the United Nations Environment Programme. It had an initial staff of 12 people. Although the GRI is independent, it remains a collaborating center of UNEP and works in cooperation with the United Nations Global Compact.

GRI has managed to mobilize extensive contributions of time, knowledge and funding from a wide variety of individuals and organizations. UN Secretary General Kofi Annan described it as having a "unique contribution to make in fostering transparency and accountability of corporate activities beyond financial matters". A key factor in GRI’s success has been its global multi-stakeholder network, which grew from about 200 organizations and individuals in early 2000 to over 2000 members by early 2002. The network provided a platform for analysis and feedback on the Guidelines, enabling diverse stakeholders to actively engage in their creation and evolution. The initial organizational structure of the GRI was highly efficient and communicated mostly electronically. It consisted of a secretariat, a steering committee, and multiple decentralized working groups. Input from the working groups led to the expansion of GRI's scope from environmental reporting to three categories of sustainability indicators: social performance indicators, economic performance indicators and environmental performance and impacts.

The GRI system was created with the goals of standardizing practices for non-financial reporting, and empowering stakeholders at all levels with "access to standardized, comparable, and consistent environmental information akin to corporate financial reporting." The process of aligning and standardizing practices has continued through multiple versions, with some debate over definitions of materiality to be used in sustainability reporting and their implicatioins. The GRI and the Sustainability Accounting Standards Board (SASB) illustrate two major approaches to materiality, with differences that may cause confusion in interpreting information about “material sustainability issues”.

== Governance ==
The "GRI" refers to the global network of thousands of participants worldwide who contribute to the creation of reporting standards, use them in disclosing their sustainability performance, demand their use by organizations as the basis for information disclosure, or are actively engaged in improving the standards. Examples of good sustainability reporting practices include digitalization of supply-chain management, stakeholder relation mechanisms, and communication strategies that encourage conjoint two-way sense making and sense giving.

The governance structure for the permanent institution was approved on June 21, 2002. The institutional side of the GRI, supporting the network, is made up of the following governance bodies: board of directors, stakeholder council, technical advisory committee, organizational stakeholders, and a secretariat. Diverse geographic and sector constituencies are represented in these governance bodies.

== Reporting guidelines ==
=== Standards for guidelines ===
The GRI standards aim to enable third parties to assess environmental impact from the activities of the company and its supply chain. The most recent of GRI's reporting frameworks are the revised Universal Standards, which were published in October 2021, and came into effect for reporting in January 2023. The GRI Universal Standards apply to all organizations and cover core sustainability issues related to a company’s impact on the economy, society, and the environment. The GRI Sector Standards apply to specific sectors, particularly those with the highest environmental impact, such as Oil and Gas, Coal, and Agriculture, Aquaculture and Fishing. The GRI Topic Standards list disclosures relevant to a particular topic area. Examples include Waste, Occupational Health and Safety, Biodiversity, Energy, Diversity and Equal Opportunity.

GRI thus provides the world's most widely used sustainability reporting standards. Under increasing pressure from different stakeholder groups, such as governments, consumers and investors, to be more transparent about their environmental, economic, and social impacts, many companies publish a sustainability report, also known as a corporate social responsibility (CSR) or environmental, social, and governance (ESG) report. GRI's framework for sustainability reporting helps companies identify, gather, and report this information in a clear and comparable manner.

The GRI Standards have a modular structure, making them easier to update and adapt. Three series of Standards support the reporting process. The GRI Universal Standards apply to all organizations and cover core sustainability issues related to a company’s impact on the economy, society, and the environment. The GRI Sector Standards apply to specific sectors, particularly those with the highest environmental impact, such as fossil fuels. The GRI Topic Standards list disclosures relevant to a particular topic area. GRI Standards and reporting criteria are reviewed every three years by the Global Sustainability Standards Board (GSSB), an independent body created by GRI. The most recent of GRI's reporting frameworks are the revised Universal Standards, which were published in October 2021, and came into effect for reporting in January 2023.

=== ESG metrics ===
Examples of a company's internal and external stakeholders.

Sustainability reporting aims to standardize and quantify the environmental, social and governance (ESG) costs and benefits, derived from the activities of the reporting companies. Examples of ESG reporting include quantified measures of CO_{2} emissions, working and payment conditions, and financial transparency.

The development of GRI standards was influenced by policies in the fields of international labor practices and environmental impact, which it, in turn has influenced. ISO 14010, ISO 14011, ISO 14012 and ISO 26000 set out a standard for assessing the environmental impact, while OHSAS 18001 laid down a health and safety risk management system. The International Labour Organization (ILO)'s eight core conventions outline specific groups or population that require special attention: women, children, migrant workers and their families, persons belonging to national or ethnic, linguistic, and religious minorities, indigenous peoples, and persons with disabilities. The reporting standards set by the GRI ESG assessment and reporting were developed based on principles set in OECD guidelines for Multinational corporations and UN Guiding Principles.

=== Accountability, adoption and registration ===
The Global Reporting Initiative is one example of a transformative shift in accountability systems to one based on a network of actors, observation of global public concerns, new problem framing and an ideological shift. Initially GRI worked with a number of Data Partners to collect and process information about GRI reporting and sustainability reporting in general and reporting trends in specific countries and regions. This information was added to GRI's Sustainability Disclosure Database. In the United States, the United Kingdom and the Republic of Ireland the official GRI data partner was the Governance & Accountability Institute.

In 2020 GRI decided to discontinue its publicly accessible sustainability disclosure database as of April 2021, due to the overhead of maintaining the collection. The publicly available database had over 63,000 reports spanning nearly 20 years from hundreds of companies.

It is still possible to register GRI Standards-based reports and other published materials through the GRI Standards Report Registration System. Under Requirement 9 of GRI 1: Foundation 2021, notifying GRI of the use of the GRI standards is a mandatory step in reporting for associated organizations. Responsibility for the quality and verification of such reports is the responsibility of the reporting organization and its stakeholders. While GRI no longer provides examples of reports, the reports of many organizations are available from company websites.

Under the 2021 guidelines, which are required for reporting as of January 2023, organizations may report either "in accordance" with GRI (more stringent) or "in reference" to GRI. Both options involve notification.

A key issue in the adoption of GRI Standards is that compliance is voluntary. Outcomes depend on the quality and type of information reported. Further, firms may selectively disclose sustainability information. Research suggests that resources for sustainability reporting may be insufficient and staff undertrained in many companies. GRI attempts to address this by providing training. In order to circumvent "greenwashing" or falsified reporting, a financial institution can conduct an independent audit of the investee or enter into a dialogue with the top management of a company in question. Independent assurance of sustainability reports may be demanded by stakeholders, and third-party assurance is standard practice for many large and mid-cap companies, though often expensive. Absence of assurance is associated with lower quality and credibility of sustainability reporting.

== Related laws and standards ==
=== European Commission Directives ===
In December 2014, the European Commission, on behalf of the European Union, adopted the Non-Financial Reporting Directive (NFRD) obliging large multinational corporations to provide non-financial disclosure to the markets. The law applies to public companies with more than 500 employees. Companies that would provide such a reporting would be required to report on environmental, social and employee-related, human rights, anti-corruption and bribery matters. Additionally, these large corporations would be required to describe their business model, outcomes and risks of the policies on the above topics, and the diversity policy applied for management and supervisory bodies. The reporting techniques were encouraged to rely on recognized frameworks such as GRI's Sustainability Reporting Guidelines, the United Nations Global Compact (UNGC), the UN Guiding Principles on Business and Human Rights, OECD Guidelines, International Organization for Standardization (ISO) 26000 and the International Labour Organization (ILO) Tripartite Declarations.

Sustainability reporting requirements for companies were further expanded in the EU's Corporate Sustainability Reporting Directive (CSRD) which took effect on 5 January 2023. GRI was actively involved in the development of the European Sustainability Reporting Standards (ESRS) which were submitted to the European Commission by the Sustainability Reporting Board (SRB) of the European Financial Reporting Advisory (EFRAG) as a step towards implementation of the Corporate Sustainability Reporting Directive (CSRD). GRI worked for interoperability between GRI's global Standards, which focus on impact materiality, and the ESRS' focus on double materiality. Double materiality requires public reporting of both sustainability factors affecting the financial materiality of the company and its outward materiality (how the company affects society and the environment).

=== International Sustainability Standards ===
As of 24 March 2022, GRI and the International Financial Reporting Standards Foundation (IFRS) announced that they would collaborate to align the International Sustainability Standards Board (“ISSB”)'s investor-focused Sustainability Disclosures Standards for the capital markets with the GRI's multi-stakeholder focused sustainability reporting standards. As of 6 June 2023, the ISSB issued its inaugural standards (IFRS S1 and IFRS S2) for sustainability-related disclosures in capital markets.

== See also ==
- Integrated reporting
- Mervyn King (judge)
- Sustainability accounting
- Sustainability marketing
- Sustainability reporting
- The Amsterdam Global Conference on Sustainability and Transparency
- Triple bottom line
- UN Global Compact
- Multistakeholder governance
