= International Sustainability Standards Board =

Sustainability accounting board

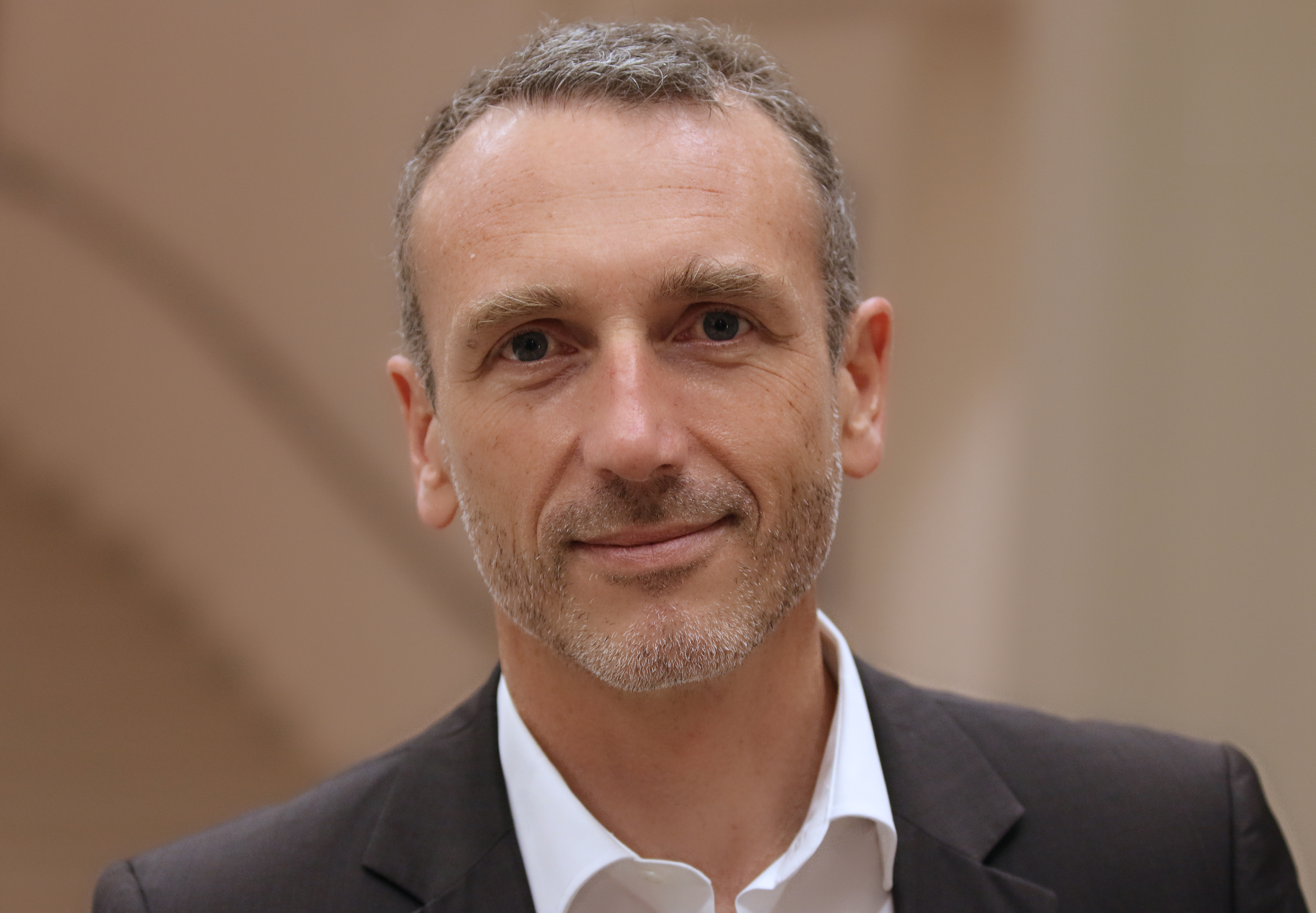
Emmanuel Faber is the first chair of the ISSB.

The International Sustainability Standards Board (ISSB) is a standard-setting body established in 2021–2022 under the IFRS Foundation, whose mandate is the creation and development of sustainability-related financial reporting standards to meet investors' needs for sustainability reporting.

== Background ==
In principle, sustainability-related disclosures have always been at least potentially part of financial reporting, given financial risks associated with sustainability matters. In practice, however, they have not always been a priority of the accounting and financial reporting community. With growing awareness of sustainability challenges and especially climate change, the need for a specific framework for sustainability-related disclosures has been recognized by environmentalists, standard setters, reporting companies and the financial industry.

=== CDSB, IIRC, SASB, VRF ===
The Climate Disclosure Standards Board (CDSB) was formed in 2007 in London as part of the Carbon Disclosure Project that began in 2002. The International Integrated Reporting Council (IIRC) was formed in London in August 2010 with the participation of several stakeholders including the Global Reporting Initiative, International Accounting Standards Board, U.S. Financial Accounting Standards Board, International Organization of Securities Commissions, and International Federation of Accountants. Separately, the Sustainability Accounting Standards Board (SASB) was created in 2011 in San Francisco with a focus on U.S. securities disclosures. In June 2021, the IIRC and SASB announced their combination to form the Value Reporting Foundation (VRF).

== Creation and early development ==
The creation of the ISSB was announced at the 2021 United Nations Climate Change Conference (COP26) in Glasgow in November 2021. Simultaneously, the IFRS Foundation announced it would consolidate the VRF and CDSB with the ISSB by June 2022. The IFRS Foundation announced the appointment of Emmanuel Faber as ISSB Chair in December 2021, and of Sue Lloyd as ISSB Vice-Chair in January 2022. In late March 2022, the ISSB published its first two exposure drafts, on climate and general sustainability-related financial disclosures respectively.

In addition to the IIRC and SASB teams based in London and San Francisco, the ISSB is recruiting staff resources in Frankfurt, where its Chair and Vice-Chair are based, and in Montreal. In June 2023, it opened another office in Beijing.

== Standards ==
ISSB standards will be part of the broader body of International Financial Reporting Standards (IFRS) and are to be known as IFRS-S ("S" for sustainability) to distinguish them from the accounting standards issued by the ISSB's sister body, the International Accounting Standards Board.

== See also ==
- Task Force on Climate Related Financial Disclosures
- Sustainability standards and certification
