= Integrated reporting =

Framework for communicating an organization's value creation

Integrated reporting (IR, or <IR> in International Integrated Reporting Council publications) in corporate communication is a "process that results in communication, most visibly a periodic “integrated report”, about value creation over time. An integrated report is a concise communication about how an organization's strategy, governance, performance and prospects lead to the creation of value over the short, medium and long term."

It means the integrated representation of a company's performance in terms of both financial and other value relevant information. Integrated Reporting provides greater context for performance data, clarifies how valuable relevant information fits into operations or a business, and may help make company decision making more long-term. While the communications that result from IR will be of benefit to a range of stakeholders, they are principally aimed at providers of financial capital allocation decisions.

IR helps to complete financial and sustainability reports. A framework has been published, but some questions remain in order to know how to apply it. Do we need one report ? Will this report be useful for investors, and for other stakeholders? Other questions could have been raised, such as who is really working for an integrated reporting, and who has interests in it.

In June 2021, the International Integrated Reporting Council and the Sustainability Accounting Standards Board announced their combination to form the Value Reporting Foundation (VRF). In November 2021, the IFRS Foundation announced it would consolidate the VRF and Climate Disclosure Standards Board with its own newly formed International Sustainability Standards Board by June 2022.

== The call for integrated reporting ==
Capitalism relies on the efficient allocation of capital to deliver returns to investors over the short, medium and long term. It is the job of companies to manage the financial capital that investors provide and also to create and preserve the value generated from other forms of non-financial data such as people, trademarks/copyrights and natural resources or nature, the basis of all life. The western model of capitalism has been questioned following the onset of the banking crisis in 2007 because of its apparent dependence on short-term financial factors over other forms of capital and longer time scales. Corporate reporting no longer reflects the needs of the 21st century, resilient capitalism needs financial stability and sustainability in its exchange with nature in order to succeed – and Integrated Reporting is intended to underpin both of these problems through communicating to providers of financial capital the information that they need. Therefore, a report of financial data is no longer sufficient, but has to be extended with information about our exchanges with nature, as money is not natural, but a 7,000 year old cultural invention. Nature has never invented a means for its exchanges.

A wide range of factors determine the value of an organization – some of these are financial or tangible in nature and are easy to account for in financial statements (e.g. property, cash), while many such as intellectual capital, competition and energy security are not. IR reflects the broad and longer-term consequences of the decisions organizations make, based on a wide range of factors, in order to create and sustain value. IR enables an organization to communicate how it is drawing on all the resources and relationships it utilises to create and preserve value in the short, medium and long term, helping investors to manage risks and allocate resources.

It is therefore seen as necessary to expand the reporting of only financial data with ecological data, for example about the greenhouse gas emissions that a company generates. In accordance with the 2015 Paris climate agreement, greenhouse gas emissions should be reduced, hence reporting on such progress within the main accounts is useful in providing accountability. Integrated Reporting therefore needs two sides, the financial balancing data as well the non-financial ecological data, it must aim at two achievements: annual financial profit per as well as profit for nature, e.g. reductions in greenhouse gas emissions.

== History of integrated reporting ==
In 2009, the Prince of Wales convened a high-level meeting of investors, standard setters, companies, accounting bodies and UN representatives including The Prince's Accounting for Sustainability Project, International Federation of Accountants (IFAC), and the Global Reporting Initiative (GRI), to establish the International Integrated Reporting Committee (IIRC), a body to oversee the creation of a globally accepted Integrated Reporting framework. In November 2011, the Committee was renamed the International Integrated Reporting Council.

=== Timeline ===
Year	Source	Aspect of Discussion
2013	Consultation Draft of the International IR Framework	16 April 2013 the IIRC released the Consultation Draft of the International IR Framework. The launch was followed by a 90-day consultation period giving all stakeholders an opportunity to respond with comments and feedback to help shape the development of the Framework.
2012	Prototype of the Framework	26 November 2012 the IIRC released a Prototype of the International IR Framework, a significant further step towards publication of the Framework in 2013. This was an interim step intended to demonstrate progress towards defining key concepts and principles that underpin IR, and support organizations' ability to produce an integrated report.
	Emerging IR Database	The Emerging Integrated Reporting Database brings together extracts of reports which illustrate emerging practices in the Guiding Principles and Content Elements. These examples have been chosen from publicly available reports, including those produced by the IIRC Pilot Programme organizations.
	BlackSun	BlackSun published, in accordance with the IIRC, 'Understanding Transformation: Building the Business Case for Integrated Reporting'
2011	Integrated Reporting Discussion Paper	The Discussion Paper Towards Integrated Reporting – Communicating Value in the 21st Century was launched Monday 12 September 2011. It considered the rationale for Integrated Reporting, offering initial proposals for the development of an International Integrated Reporting Framework and outlining the next steps towards its creation and adoption. Its purpose was to prompt input from all those with a stake in improved reporting, including producers and users of reports.
	IIRC Pilot Programme	On 17 and 18 October 2011, the first Integrated Reporting Pilot Programme conference was convened in Rotterdam. The Pilot Programme is made up of a Business Network and Investor Network that are both feeding back to the IIRC with their progression towards Integrated Reporting. There are over 80 Businesses and over 25 Investors participating in the Pilot Programme
2010	Robert Eccles and Mike Krzus	Book discussing trends towards greater transparency in external reporting and how integrated reporting can address this. Coins the term "one report" as a reference to integrated reporting.
	Official Formation of the IIRC	On 2 August 2010 the International Integrated Reporting Committee. The steering committee was chaired by Sir Michael Peat, Principle Private Secretary to TRH The Prince of Wales and the Duchess of Cornwall, with Professor Mervyn King, Chairman, King Committee on Corporate Governance and Chairman, Global Reporting Initiative, as Deputy Chairman. The Working Group announced co-chairman Paul Druckman and Ian Ball.
	SAICA	South Africa has established a multi-organisation Integrated Reporting Committee (IRC). The aim is to develop guidelines on integrated reporting. Its first task will be to develop a framework for an integrated report for listed companies. The Committee is chaired by Professor Mervyn King.
2009	Preliminary Foundation of IIRC	The International Integrated Reporting Committee was discussed by those attending The Prince's Accounting for Sustainability Forum meeting on 17 December 2009
	International Corporate Governance Network (ICGN)	Puts forward a statement discussing the reasons for integrating non-financial information into annual reports. Couched in terms of risk mitigation and assessing the quality of management in dealing with risk.
	St. James's Palace Meeting	Meeting of key players in sustainability reporting on September 11, 2009: discussed idea and meaning of integrated reporting and the challenges facing its adoption.
	European Commission Workshops on ESG Disclosure	Series of 5 workshops. Discussed ESG disclosure from different stakeholders' perspectives, identified motivations, barriers, challenges and ways of addressing these issues.
	Institute of Directors in Southern Africa (KING III)	South African governance code to take effect in March 2010. Provides guidance against Companies Act 2008. Asks companies to provide an integrated report that provides a holistic and integrated representation of the company's performance. Reports may be presented in a single report or dual reports. If dual reports, then should be released simultaneously.
	Tracy Oates	Reports on need for integrated reporting, discusses issues and challenges involved in developing integrated reports.
	Jayne Mammat, Ernst & Young South Africa	Paper outlines recent trends in sustainability reporting. References King III in call for integrated reporting. Says "integrated sustainability reporting is more about management than reporting."
2008	Corporate Register	Corporate Register began awarding the first annual award for Best Integrated Report.
	KPMG and SustainAbility	Trends found in GRI Readers Choice's 2008 survey indicate readers are looking for sustainability reports to integrated with annual financial reports.
2007	Alan Willis	Proposes a new corporate reporting model based on Corporation20/20 principles of governance. This includes integrating financial and non-financial information in one report.
	The Prince's Accounting For Sustainability Project (A4S)	Proposes the Reporting Framework, Connected a framework for approaching reporting that recognizes ESG concerns. Includes reporting on "core" environmental indicators such as waste, water, energy, carbon emissions.
	WICI, World Intellectual Capital Initiative (WICI)	WICI's mission is to develop a voluntary global framework for measuring and reporting corporate performance to shareholders and other stakeholders. This framework is based on a combination of a PWC reporting framework and KPIs for ESG Issues by the DVFA – Society of Investment Professionals in Germany. WICI is essentially a XBRL taxonomy.
2005	Allen White	Puts forward an agenda for integrated reporting, who, why, what could be common approaches.
	Vancity	Reviews 12 organizations producing integrated reports and discusses definitions of integrated reporting based on exploratory research. Presents issues and challenges.
2004	SustainAbility	Timescale for experimentation with integrated reporting and challenges and opportunities associated with integrated reports.
	Enhanced Business Reporting Consortium (EBR360)	Mission is to provide a voluntary, global disclosure framework for the presentation of the non-financial components of business reports, including key performance indicators. The focus of the model will be on information that delivers a broader view of a company's current and future performance.
2003	Business in the Community	Release of the report by the Business Impact Review Group, "Indicators That Count", which includes findings of 20 companies in implementing a set of impact indicators covering workplace, community, environment and marketplace for external reporting purposes.
	Magna Rautenbach	Authored a course on Integrated Sustainability Accounting, Assurance and Reporting (ISAAR), which was sponsored by Deloitte South Africa and presented through the University of South Africa (UNISA) Centre for Corporate Citizenship. Says "integrated sustainability accounting, assurance and reporting is a dynamic management process for social, economic and environmental sustainability, mutually beneficial to the organisation and its stakeholders."
2002	Novozymes	Novozymes, a Danish enzyme company spun off from Novo Nordisk in 2000, produced the first corporate integrated report in 2002. Novo Nordisk itself began integrated reporting shortly thereafter.
	Institute of Directors of Southern Africa (KING II)	South African governance code. Integrated Sustainability Reporting. A company is expected to report on its commitments in social and environmental areas.
1999	PricewaterhouseCoopers (PwC)	Created the ValueReporting Framework (now known as the Corporate Reporting Framework) which identifies information that all industries and companies share in common: market overview, strategy and structure, managing for value, and performance, all underpinned by relevant performance measures.

== International Integrated Reporting Council ==
The International Integrated Reporting Council (IIRC), of which Mervyn King is chair, was convened in order to aid businesses and investors as they begin to adopt Integrated Reporting. Launched in 2010 by the Prince of Wales with international partners. The IIRC was formerly known as the International Integrated Reporting Committee, being renamed in 2011. The Prince's Accounting for Sustainability Project (A4S) acted as the Secretariat for the IIRC until January 2012.

The IIRC calls itself 'a global coalition of regulators, investors, companies, standard setters, the accounting profession and NGOs. Together, this coalition shares the view that communication about businesses' value creation should be the next step in the evolution of corporate reporting'. It states its mission is to create the globally accepted International IR Framework that elicits from organizations material information about their strategy, governance, performance and prospects in a clear, concise and comparable format. The Framework is intended to underpin and accelerate the evolution of corporate reporting, reflecting developments in financial governance, management commentary and sustainability reporting.

The IIRC produced a 'Discussion Paper' in 2011 from which the overwhelming feedback demonstrated overwhelming support for Integrated Reporting and endorsed the development of a global Framework. It also concluded that the primary audience of integrated reports is investors in order to aid their allocation of financial capital.

=== The IIRC Pilot Programme ===
The IIRC began a Pilot Programme in 2011 in order to underpin the development of the International Integrated Reporting Framework. The group of organizations participating in the Pilot Programme have the opportunity to contribute to the development of the Framework. Paul Druckman, CEO IIRC, said "We call the Pilot Programme our "innovation hub" - made up of people who want to push the boundaries just a little bit further, to challenge, or at least question orthodox thinking, and to acknowledge the importance of reporting to the way our organizations think and behave".

There are over 90 businesses in the Pilot Programme Business Network include Unilever, Coca-Cola, Microsoft, China Light and Power, Hyundai, Diesel & Motor Engineering PLC (Dimo-Sri Lanka) and HSBC.

The IIRC, in collaboration with UNPRI set up an Investor Network as part of its Pilot Programme. It is made up of over 30 investor organizations in order to help shape the Framework by providing an investor's perspective on the shortfalls in current corporate reporting.

=== The International Integrated Reporting Framework ===
The IIRC was created with the remit of developing the globally accepted International IR Framework that elicits from organizations material information about their strategy, governance, performance and prospects in a clear, concise and comparable format. The Framework will underpin and accelerate the evolution of corporate reporting, reflecting developments in financial, governance, management commentary and sustainability reporting. The benefits of the Framework are purported to be the enabling of informed decision-making that leads to efficient capital allocation and the creation and preservation of value.

The Framework is ultimately intended as a guidance for all businesses producing integrated reports.

== National integrated reporting practices ==
=== Netherlands ===
The Dutch accountancy body, NBA (Koninklijke Nederlandse Beroepsorganisatie van Accountants) announced in 2015 that it would be collaborating with the IIRC "to increase the momentum towards integrated reporting by raising awareness in markets across the world".

=== South Africa ===
Corporate reporting on financial and non-financial information in a single document has grown as companies such as BlackSun have produced research which suggests that producing integrated reports will have a strong correlation to the resilience and ability of a business to create value in the short, medium and long term. For many years businesses have been producing both Annual Reports and separate sustainability reports. However, increasingly often businesses are starting to produce integrated reports. On 1 March 2010 the Johannesburg Stock Exchange (JSE) adopted the King III principles as part of its listing requirements, which require listed companies to apply King III or explain which recommendations have not been applied and publicly provide reasons therefore. King III recommends Integrated Reporting and hence the requirements for listed companies to issue integrated reports.

In the King III Report (otherwise known as King Code of Governance for South Africa 2009), Integrated Reporting is referred to in this manner: "A key challenge for leadership is to make sustainability issues mainstream. Strategy, risk, performance and sustainability have become inseparable; hence the phrase ‘integrated reporting’ which is used throughout this Report."

== See also ==
- Corporate social responsibility
- Environmental Social and Corporate Governance
- EthicalQuote
- Financial statement
- Islamic Reporting Initiative
- King Report on Corporate Governance
- Social accounting
- Socially responsible investing
- Sustainability reporting
- Triple bottom line
