= Sustainability Accounting Standards Board =

Non-profit accounting standards organization

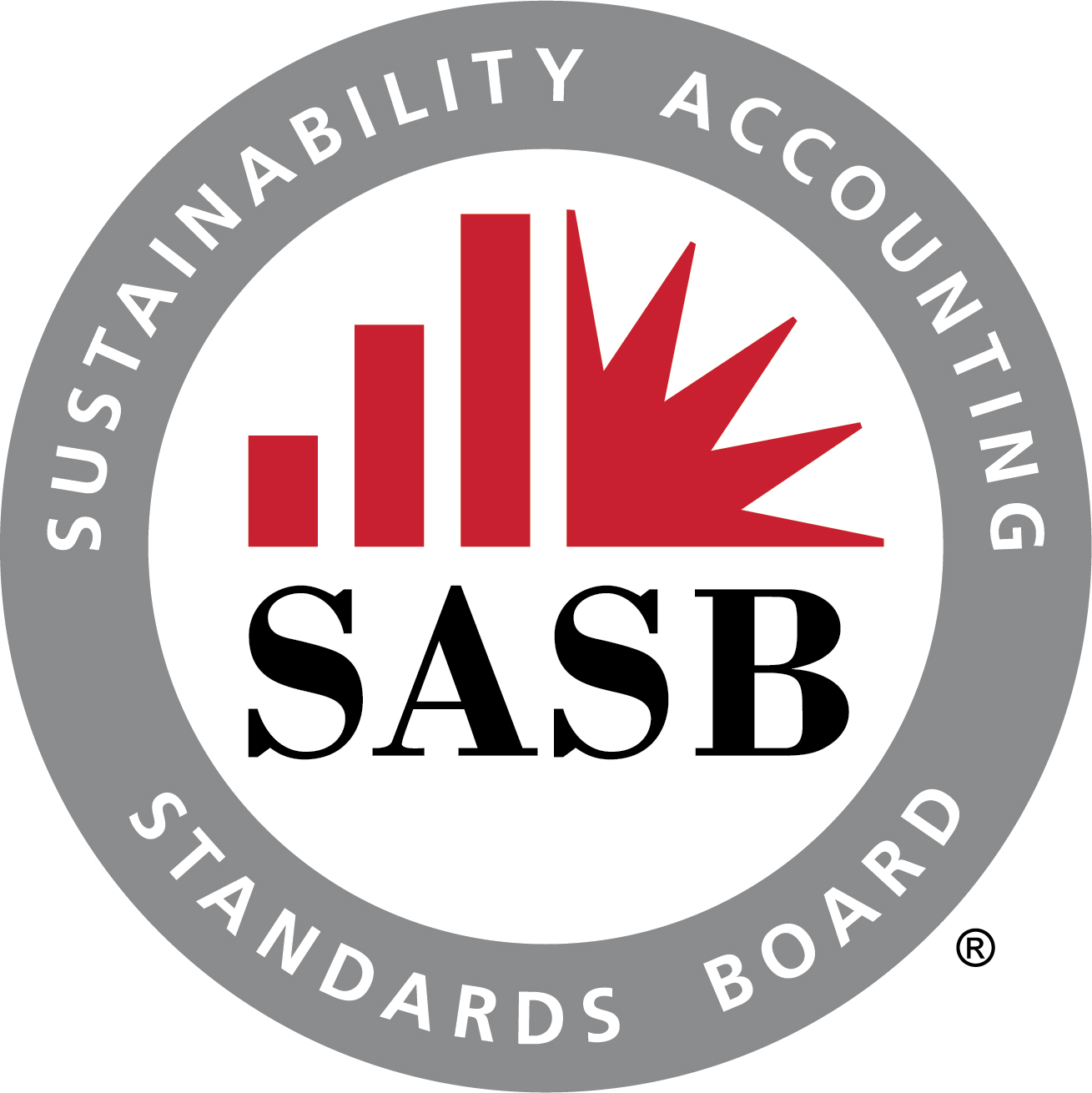
- Founded: July 2011
- Founder: Jean Rogers
- Type: Non-profit organization
- Purpose: Sustainability accounting, Environmental, social and corporate governance
- Location: 1045 Sansome St, San Francisco, California, United States
- Website: www.sasb.org

The Sustainability Accounting Standards Board (SASB) is a non-profit organization, founded in 2011 by Jean Rogers to develop sustainability accounting standards. Investors, lenders, insurance underwriters, and other providers of financial capital are increasingly attuned to the impact of environmental, social, and governance (ESG) factors on the financial performance of companies, driving the need for standardized reporting of ESG data. Just as the International Accounting Standards Board (IASB) and the Financial Accounting Standards Board (FASB) have established International Financial Reporting Standards and Generally Accepted Accounting Principles (GAAP), respectively, which are currently used in the financial statements, SASB's stated mission “is to establish industry-specific disclosure standards across ESG topics that facilitate communication between companies and investors about financially material, decision-useful information. Such information should be relevant, reliable and comparable across companies on a global basis.”

SASB standards are used by companies around the world in a variety of disclosure channels, including their annual reports, financial filings, company websites, sustainability reports, and more.

In June 2021, the SASB and the London-based International Integrated Reporting Council announced their combination to form the Value Reporting Foundation (VRF). In November 2021, the IFRS Foundation announced it would consolidate the VRF and Climate Disclosure Standards Board with its own newly formed International Sustainability Standards Board (ISSB) by June 2022. This was completed by August 2022, when all the open SASB Standards projects were transitioned to the ISSB.

== Organizational structure ==
SASB's work is overseen by the SASB Foundation Board of Directors and carried out by the Standards Board and SASB staff. In this regard, SASB's governance structure is similar to other internationally recognized standard-setting bodies such as FASB and IASB.

The SASB Foundation is responsible for the “financing, oversight, administration and appointment of the SASB Standards Board”. The Board of Directors, the organization's governance body, appoints members of the Standards Board and oversees the integrity of its due process. Some of the prominent members of the SASB Foundation Board of Directors have included a former SEC chair, former FASB chair, former mayor of New York City, a chair of the central bank of the Netherlands, De Nederlandsche Bank, chair of the World Benchmarking Alliance, as well as many other distinguished individuals. The current chair of the Foundation Board of Directors is Robert K. Steel.

== History ==
SASB was founded in 2011 by Jean Rogers, who originated the concept and served as organization's first CEO. Its primary aim was to develop standards for use in corporate filings to the U.S. Securities and Exchange Commission (SEC). The intention was to provide investors with comparable, non-financial information about the companies whose stocks they or their investment funds owned and to allow investors and financial analysts to compare performance on critical environmental, social, and governance (ESG) issues within an industry. The founding chair of the organization's Board of Directors was Robert G. Eccles. Initial funding for the organization came from private donors. In 2017, the organization underwent a governance change to establish a more formal separation between oversight, administration, and finances (the SASB Foundation) and technical standard-setting work (the Standards Board), in order to better align its structure with traditional financial standard-setting organizations such as IASB and FASB. As SASB worked towards codification of the first full set of its standards, its work involved extensive outreach to investors, many of whom hold globally diversified portfolios. SASB also engaged in consultation with corporations, many with multinational operations. One of the recurring messages that SASB heard was the idea that financial information, like financial capital – needs to be able to move across borders. As a result, beginning in 2018, SASB began to encourage (public and private) companies around the world to report using SASB disclosure topics and metrics in all communications with investors – not just in US public filings. This can include annual reports, integrated reports, investor relations sections of a company website and stand-alone SASB reports. In addition to these cases, many companies started including SASB disclosure tables in corporate social responsibility and sustainability reports. To ensure quality, SASB recommends that the companies use the same level of rigor and internal controls as used for traditional financial measures when reporting sustainability-related performance to investors.

After a six-year effort, SASB launched the standards in November 2018.

== Guiding Principles ==
SASB operates with a set of core principles that guide its approach to standard setting, as defined in its Conceptual Framework. These principles are designed to facilitate sustainability disclosures that provide material, decision useful information to investors and are cost effective for reporting companies.

- Global Applicability
- Financial Materiality
- Approach to Standard-Setting:
  - Industry-Specific
  - Evidence-Based
  - Market-Informed

=== Global Applicability ===
SASB's mission statement notes that investor-focused sustainability “information should be relevant, reliable and comparable across companies on a global basis.” SASB has pointed out that “more than three-quarters of SASB metrics are appropriate for use by companies and investors globally, and the remaining metrics are under review to enhance their global applicability.”

=== Financial Materiality ===
SASB Standards are geared toward providing decision-useful information to investors. Because the standards are investor-driven, evidence of financial materiality is the underpinning for the standards. SASB states that its standards focus on “financially material issues because our mission is to help businesses around the world report on the sustainability topics that matter most to their investors.” This focus has been recognized by firms such as BlackRock, as referenced in Larry Fink's 2020 letter to CEOs, which said, “BlackRock believes that the Sustainability Accounting Standards Board (SASB) provides a clear set of standards for reporting sustainability information across a wide range of issues, from labor practices to data privacy to business ethics.” SASB's emphasis on financial materiality sets it apart from other sustainability reporting standards, such as those of the Global Reporting Initiative (GRI), which “focuses on a company’s impacts on the broader economy, environment and society to determine its material issues.”

=== Approach to Standard-Setting ===
SASB uses its Conceptual Framework as guidance in its approach to setting sustainability accounting standards. The SASB Conceptual Framework “sets out the basic concepts, principles, definitions, and objectives that guide SASB in its approach to setting standards for sustainability accounting”. SASB's mission statement was revised in 2018, and the Conceptual Framework does not reflect the current mission statement. SASB initiated a project to update its Conceptual Framework in September 2019.

==== Industry-Specific ====
SASB has developed a unique standard for each industry. This is due to the fact that sustainability issues manifest differently from one industry to another due to differences in business models, resource dependencies, and other factors. As Eccles has noted, “For each industry, standards have been established for the ESG issues most likely to be material to investors.” SASB developed standards for 77 industries across 11 sectors. SASB's Sustainable Industry Classification System® (SICS®) organizes industries using a combination of traditional classification factors and sustainability risks and opportunities. “To identify the disclosure topics that are likely to impact all or most companies in an industry, the SASB has developed its own industry classification system. The system differs from typical industry classification systems, such as the Global Industry Classification Standard (GICS), in that it classifies companies based on common sustainability issues. For example, the GICS identifies three industries in the technology hardware and equipment industry group, including communications equipment; technology hardware, storage, and peripherals; and electronic equipment, instruments, and components. But communications equipment, computers and peripherals, and office electronics have very similar sustainability issues. Accordingly, they are included in the same group (i.e., hardware) in SASB’s sustainability-based industry classification system.” SASB's website has a SICS® lookup tool that identifies the industry classification of tens of thousands of publicly listed companies.

SICS® Sector	SICS® Industries
Consumer Goods	Apparel, Accessories & Footwear Appliance Manufacturing Building Products & Furnishings E-Commerce Household & Personal Products Multiline and Specialty Retailers & Distributors Toys & Sporting Goods
Extractives & Minerals Processing	Coal Operations Construction Materials Iron & Steel Producers Metals & Mining Oil & Gas – Exploration & Production Oil & Gas – Midstream Oil & Gas – Refining & Marketing Oil & Gas – Services
Financials	Asset Management & Custody Activities Commercial Banks Consumer Finance Insurance Investment Banking & Brokerage Mortgage Finance Security & Commodity Exchange
Food & Beverage	Agricultural Products Alcoholic Beverages Food Retailers & Distributors Meat, Poultry & Dairy Non-Alcoholic Beverages Processed Foods Restaurants Tobacco
Health Care	Biotechnology & Pharmaceuticals Drug Retailers Health Care Delivery Health Care Distributors Managed Care Medical Equipment & Supplies
Infrastructure	Electric Utilities & Power Generators Engineering & Construction Services Gas Utilities & Distributors Home Builders Real Estate Real Estate Services Waste Management Water Utilities & Services
Renewable Resources & Alternative Energy	Biofuels Forestry Management Fuel Cells & Industrial Batteries Pulp & Paper Products Solar Technology & Project Developers Wind Technology & Project Developers
Resource Transformation	Aerospace & Defense Chemicals Containers & Packaging Electrical & Electronic Equipment Industrial Machinery & Goods
Services	Advertising & Marketing Casinos & Gaming Education Hotels & Lodging Leisure Facilities Media & Entertainment Professional & Commercial Services
Technology & Communications	Electronic Manufacturing Services & Original Design Manufacturing Hardware Internet Media & Services Semiconductors Software & IT Services Telecommunication Services
Transportation	Air Freight & Logistics Airlines Auto Parts Automobiles Car Rental & Leasing Cruise Lines Marine Transportation Rail Transportation Road Transportation

==== Evidence-Based ====
SASB standards are designed to generate standardized and comparable data, which is decision-useful for investors and typically quantitative. Compliance Week notes that “SASB saves companies time and costs by: (a) performing evidence-based research and industry vetting to identify the likely material issues; and (b) identifying metrics that companies can use to disclose performance on these issues. In researching and developing its standards, SASB identifies the sustainability risks and opportunities for which clear evidence exists that companies in an industry are financially impacted and investors are interested in those impacts. SASB standards average five topics and 14 metrics (79 percent quantitative) per industry.”

The effectiveness of SASB's framework was validated by independent research from Harvard Business School. Researchers used SASB standards to produce the first significant study that differentiated between those sustainability factors that are likely to have material financial impacts and those that are not. Using historical data, the study tracked the performance of 2,307 unique firms over 13,397 unique firm-years across 6 sectors and 45 industries, and found that firms enjoyed significantly higher accounting and market returns when they addressed financially material sustainability factors, and significantly higher returns still when they efficiently concentrated on financially material sustainability factors to the exclusion of immaterial sustainability factors. These findings have since been replicated in a variety of contexts.

==== Market-Informed ====
SASB Chair Jeff Hales writes that a “market-informed approach to standard setting has always been in SASB’s DNA". SASB standards are formulated and vetted using a balance of perspectives from investors, corporate professionals and subject-matter experts. For example, market input from reporting companies helps SASB leverage commonly used metrics from existing frameworks and regulations to ensure use of the standards is cost-effective. Former Foundation Board chair Robert Eccles has said, “For most industries, only about five or six issues with unique industry manifestation are identified as Disclosure Topics to inform corporate reporting. Clearly there are other ESG issues that matter to society, but the list that are directly related to shareholder value creation is fairly small. This is good news for companies. It means that the often-complained-about ‘reporting burden’ is not a large one for an investor audience.”

In 2018, SASB announced a group of 87 industry experts to serve on the organization’s inaugural Standards Advisory Group (SAG) – the number has since grown to over 150 individuals. The Standards Advisory Group “consists of industry experts from leading companies, investment firms, and third parties who will work to improve the quality and comparability of sustainability-related disclosure by advising SASB on matters of implementation and emerging issues that should be considered in the standards development process."

== Standard-Setting Process ==
SASB uses a project-based model, approaching updates to the standards on an issue-by-issue basis, rather than updating all the standards at once. This approach allows SASB to address priority broad themes, regulatory changes, and market trends. When research and market consultation indicates that issues identified by SASB's project-based model warrant standard-setting, SASB applies the due process outlined in its Rules of Procedure. Historical versions of the standards and associated evidence are found in SASB's Standard-Setting Archive.

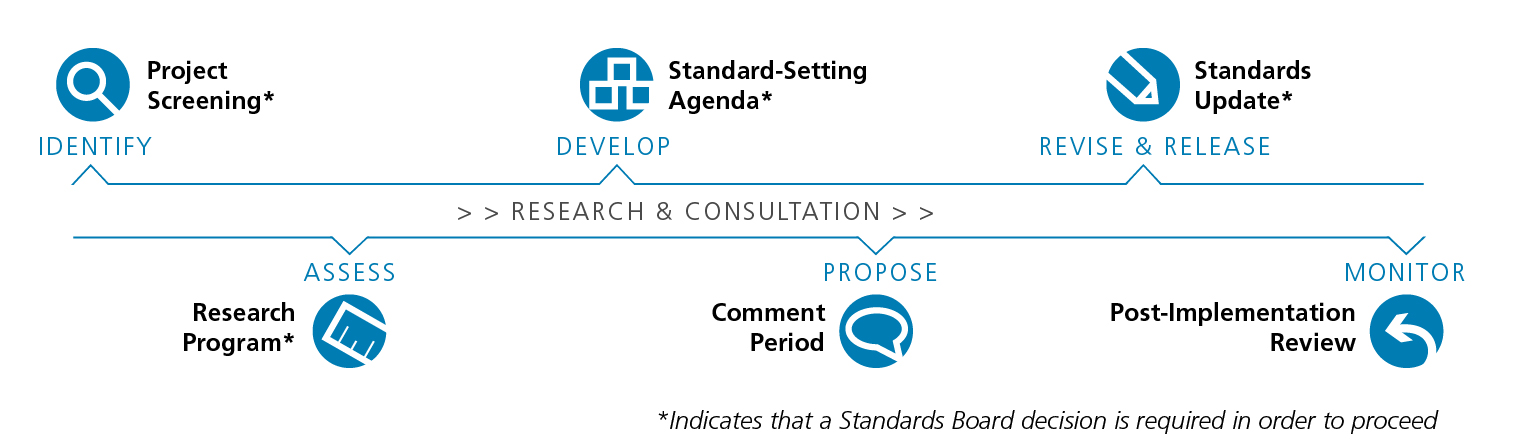

=== Rules of Procedure ===
SASB's Rules of Procedure establishes the processes and practices followed by SASB in its standard-setting activities, and in its governance and oversight of related activities undertaken by its staff. In establishing a formal governance model, the rules describe SASB's organizational structure, including the roles, composition, and operating procedures of the Standards Board. The Rules also provide an overview of SASB's standard-setting due process, which involves the systematic, independent evaluation of evidence-based research, stakeholder consultation, proposed updates, public comment, and ratification—all of which are subject to public transparency.

=== Current Projects ===
SASB maintains a list of current research and standard-setting projects on its website.

== Market Use ==
Industry leaders from many disciplines seek to better understand and manage ESG-related risk and opportunities and many are turning to SASB standards. Investors, reporting companies, consultants, and representatives of the accounting profession are using SASB's standards and underlying materiality framework to understand the intersection between companies’ sustainability and financial performance.

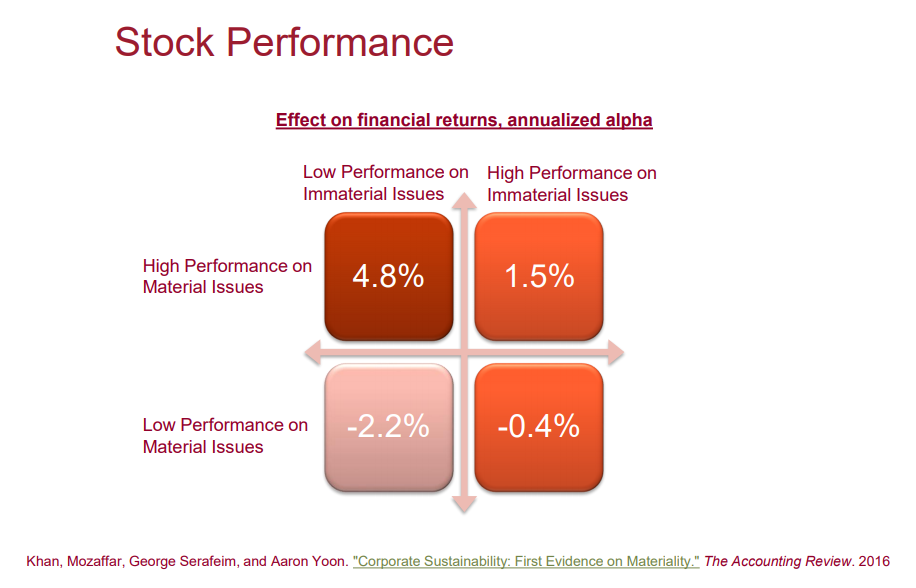
"Corporate Sustainability: First Evidence on Materiality"

=== Companies ===
SASB standards and tools enable businesses around the world to identify and manage financially material sustainability issues and communicate on these issues to investors. Companies like GM, Merck, Nike, Host Hotels & Resorts, Kilroy Realty, and JetBlue were early adopters of SASB standards, using the provisional standards to report on financially material ESG issues. As of the beginning of 2020, of the more than 120 companies using the standards, 76 were based in the US, while 44 were domiciled elsewhere.

The global marketplace for unique and creative goods Etsy, Inc. pushed the frontiers of sustainability assurance and reporting in its fiscal year-end filing for 2019, Securities and Exchange Commission (SEC) Form 10-K. Etsy prepared a detailed sustainability report based on SASB standards, engaged its auditor PwC to provide a review report on its sustainability report, included its sustainability report in its 10-K, and referred readers to its investor relations website, which includes PwC's name and a copy of the review report.

Vornado Realty, a $13 billion market cap Real Estate Investment Trust (REIT), was the first company to report on sustainability through a current report on SEC Form 8-K and the first company to include an examination report of ESG topics in an SEC filing in 2019. Vornado attached a press release, a copy of its ESG report—which included detailed SASB and GRI reports and respective review and examination reports from its auditor Deloitte & Touche as exhibits.

=== Investors ===
Investors and analysts are increasingly looking beyond financial statements for a more comprehensive view of company performance and seeking out sustainability data to enhance their understanding of ESG-related risks and opportunities. Asset managers and owners around the world have used SASB standards to inform their analysis and decision-making across a variety of asset classes and investment strategies, including fundamental equity and fixed income analysis, index construction, private market fund monitoring, manager evaluation, corporate engagement, proxy voting, and more.

In State Street Global Advisors’ 2020 annual letter on its proxy voting agenda, President & CEO Cyrus Taraporevala described SSGA's endorsement of SASB's framework. “We believe a company’s ESG score will soon effectively be as important as its credit rating.”

BlackRock has also publicly encouraged the use of SASB standards. CEO Larry Fink's 2020 letter to CEOs speaks to the need for standardized sustainability reporting, writing “Important progress improving disclosure has already been made – and many companies already do an exemplary job of integrating and reporting on sustainability – but we need to achieve more widespread and standardized adoption. While no framework is perfect, BlackRock believes that the Sustainability Accounting Standards Board (SASB) provides a clear set of standards for reporting sustainability information across a wide range of issues, from labor practices to data privacy to business ethics.” Fink's 2020 letter to clients clearly states BlackRock's expectations for companies it invests in, “We are asking companies to publish SASB and TCFD-aligned disclosures.”

==== Investor Advisory Group ====
SASB established its Investor Advisory Group (IAG) in late 2016 to provide investor feedback and guidance for the organization, and to demonstrate investor support for a market standard for investor-focused sustainability disclosure. A total of 50+ firms, accounting for more than $40 trillion in assets under management, now serve as IAG members. It comprises leading asset owners and asset managers who are committed to improving the quality and comparability of sustainability-related disclosure to investors. Eivind Lorgen, CEO and President of Nordea Asset Management in North America, is the current Chair and Hans Op ’t Veld, Head of Responsible Investment at PGGM, is the Vice Chair of IAG.

Vanguard’s then-CEO William McNabb wrote this about the IAG in a 2017 letter to shareholders: “Our participation in the Investor Advisory Group to the Sustainability Accounting Standards Board (SASB) reflects our belief that materiality-driven, sector-specific disclosures will better illuminate risks in a way that aids market efficiency and price discovery. We believe it is incumbent on all market participants—investors, boards, and management alike—to embrace the disclosure of sustainability risks that bear on a company’s long-term value creation prospects.”

The IAG's founding members included large, mainstream asset managers such as BlackRock, Goldman Sachs Asset Management, Nordea Asset Management, and State Street Global Advisors, as well as prominent asset owners such as CalPERS, CalSTRS, and Ontario Teachers Pension Plan. The founding chair of the IAG was Christopher Ailman, Chief Investment Officer of the California State Teachers’ Retirement System (CalSTRS). Barbara Zvan, Chief Risk & Strategy Officer of the Ontario Teacher's Pension Plan, also chaired the group from May 2019 to April 2020.

=== Commercial Use ===
State Street Global Advisors (SSGA) announced the R-Factor™ scoring system, a transparent scoring system that generates a unique ESG score for publicly listed companies, measuring “the performance of a company’s business operations and governance as it relates to financially material ESG challenges facing the company’s industry.” SSGA uses SASB's materiality framework to generate its scores, explaining that “to access appropriate data, we leverage raw metrics from three different ESG data providers, and identify which metrics are material to an industry according to the SASB framework.”

Bloomberg launched the Bloomberg SASB ESG Index Family in late 2019, leveraging SASB standards and SSGA's scoring system. “Building on the SASB’s market-informed materiality framework, Bloomberg will now offer ESG policy benchmarks for asset owners and custom indices that maximize the R-Factor ESG score. These offerings will help investors track companies and create sustainable, long-term value in a way that supports their fiduciary responsibilities.” SASB itself does not rate company performance on the standards. Rating, ranking, and scoring is the role of licensees.

==== Licensing ====
The SASB Foundation has licensed its standards and related resources to power a variety of investment strategies, platforms, and products. Licensing organizations include asset managers and asset owners; banks and multilateral organizations; data, analytics, and research firms; and corporate reporting software companies. In addition to the State Street and Bloomberg examples cited above, licensing applications include investment strategies from Russell Investments, services from TruValue Labs and RepRisk, and indices developed by ET Index. SASB's website has a list of licensing companies and information on how organizations are licensing SASB IP.

== Alignment with Other Sustainability Reporting Frameworks ==
=== Climate-Related Disclosure ===
The Task Force on Climate-Related Financial Disclosures (TCFD) publishes recommendations for climate-related financial risk disclosures, and many organizations have publicly expressed support for the TCFD recommendations. In 2019, SASB began a collaboration with the Climate Disclosure Standards Board (CDSB) to create an effective solution for TCFD implementation by global organizations across all industries. Organizations can use the TCFD Implementation Guide, along with SASB's and CDSB's tools, to “provide more effective climate-related disclosures that are comparable within industries and have clear links to material financial impacts. In 2019, the Corporate Reporting Dialogue – an initiative bringing together the major ESG standard setters and framework providers globally, including SASB – released a report “showing high levels of alignment between the frameworks on the basis of the Task Force on Climate-related Financial Disclosures (TCFD) recommendations.”

=== SASB and GRI ===
SASB's approach differs from that of the Global Reporting Initiative (GRI), but the organizations have stated that their standards complement one another. On the subject of the complementary strengths of these two major standards, GRI's CEO Tim Mohin said, “The GRI Sustainability Reporting Standards (GRI Standards) and the SASB Sustainability Accounting Standards are designed for different, but complementary, purposes. Stated simply, GRI looks at the company’s impacts on the world and the SASB looks at the world’s impacts on the company." The GRI Standards support broad and comprehensive disclosures for a comprehensive understanding of the organization's impacts on economy, environment, and society. SASB standards offer an industry-focused perspective on a subset of issues that are financially material. Many companies, such as ArcelorMittal, Diageo, and Nike, report with both SASB and GRI Standards.

=== Collaboration with Other Sustainability Reporting Organizations ===
SASB's Standards Board Chair Jeff Hales has stated that “Although we have always worked toward alignment—for example, the provisional SASB standards reference some 200 sources, with roughly half of those outside the U.S.—we can do better. Thus, as we look ahead, SASB will place greater emphasis on how it complements other approaches, including the recommendations of the Task Force on Climate-related Financial Disclosures (TCFD), the framework of the Climate Disclosure Standards Board (CDSB), and the Global Reporting Initiative (GRI).”

SASB is a member of the Better Alignment Project, a project facilitated by the Corporate Reporting Dialogue. Through the Better Alignment Project, participants will map their respective sustainability standards and frameworks to identify the commonalities and differences between them, jointly refining and continuously improving overlapping disclosures and data points to achieve better alignment. Participants in the Better Alignment Project include the Climate Disclosure Standards Board (CDSB), the Global Reporting Initiative (GRI), the International Integrated Reporting Council (IIRC), and the Sustainability Accounting Standards Board (SASB). SASB also participates in the Impact Management Project, which is a “forum for organizations to build consensus on how to measure, compare and report impacts on environmental and social issues."

== Educational Efforts ==
Sustainability accounting is an emerging practice, and SASB is working to build expertise in the field. SASB offers a Fundamentals of Sustainability Accounting (FSA) credential for professionals interested in improving their understanding of the connections between sustainability information and financial performance.

SASB works to educate future business leaders as well, through ongoing collaboration with colleges and universities, such as Fordham University's Gabelli School of Business. Fordham currently offers a class which gives students the opportunity to complete various research projects in partnership with the SASB. In a memorandum of understanding between Fordham University and SASB, the purpose of the collaboration is to “advance the emerging field of sustainability accounting through education, research, and public events." Additionally, the SASB recognizes “the importance of educating our next generation of market participants (e.g., corporate leaders, investors, lawyers, and accountants), and the unique intersection of technical disciplines required to advance the legitimacy and rigor of field—from business to law to sustainability—there is an opportunity to drive measurement and management of critical environmental, social, and governance factors that are important to sustain our businesses, our economies, and our societies.”

== See also ==
- Natural capital
- Environmental Profit and Loss Account
- International Sustainability Standards Board
- Sustainability accounting
- Environmental, social and corporate governance
