= Task Force on Climate-related Financial Disclosures =

Climate risk disclosure framework

Logo of TCFD

The Task Force on Climate Related Financial Disclosures (TCFD) provides information to investors about what companies are doing to mitigate the risks of climate change, as well as be transparent about the way in which they are governed. It was established in December 2015 by the Group of 20 (G20) and the Financial Stability Board (FSB), and is chaired by Michael Bloomberg. It consists of governance, strategy, risk management, and metrics and targets. It will become mandatory for companies to report on these disclosures by 2025 in the UK, although some companies will have to report earlier.

== Origins from the Paris Agreement ==
The TCFD was formed, in part, as a response to the 2015 Paris Agreement. The Agreement established nationally determined contributions (NDCs), which demonstrated each nation's own commitment to tackle climate change. On the one hand, the UN and the Centre for Climate Change Economics and Policy hailed the Agreement as 'historic' for securing NDC commitments from 189 countries. On the other hand, these contributions are also 'widely recognised as insufficient to achieve the goal of keeping global warming well below 2 °C or efforts to limit it to 1.5 °C.' One of the most significant criticisms of the NDC approach is the lack of transparency and international standards by which countries demonstrate or disclose that they are meeting their commitments.

To help identify the information needed by investors, lenders, and insurance underwriters to appropriately assess and price climate-related risks and opportunities, the Financial Stability Board established an industry-led task force: the TCFD. Under the chairmanship of Michael Bloomberg, the Task Force published recommendations designed to standardise worldwide climate-related disclosures that could "promote more informed investment... and in turn, enable stakeholders to understand better concentrations of carbon-related assets in the financial sectors."

== TCFD in the UK ==
In 2015, the FSB created the Task Force in order to develop recommendations of voluntary disclosures for listed companies. However, ahead of the COP26 summit (2021), the UK responded to the clear 'leadership vacuum on climate change governance' to become the first G20 country to mandate 1,300 of the UK's largest private companies to disclose climate-related data in line with the TCFD recommendations.

Rather than the previous comply or explain regime, the UK Chancellor of the Exchequer announced a mandatory comply and apply, whereby the Government would 'mandate climate disclosures by large, private companies and financial institutions by 2025.' However, according to the Financial Services and Markets Act 2000, s.89A F2(1)(a), although the FCA may create new rules which impose disclosure requirements upon public limited companies, they do not have the statutory authority to impose such disclosure upon private companies limited by shares.

== Formation of the ISSB ==
Previously, there was 'no set standard for how climate data should be verified, or by whom. Most of the... companies that got climate data verified employed an engineering or consulting firm, rather than an accounting one...' However, at COP26, the IFRS announced the formation of the International Sustainability Standards Board (ISSB), into which the TCFD will converge. The ISSB intends to work 'in close cooperation' with the International Accounting Standards Board (IASB) to ensure harmonisation is achieved between the conceptually based IFRS accounting standards and the ISSB's sustainability disclosure standards.

== Conclusion ==
Climate change presents financial risk to the global economy. This includes the risks and opportunities presented by rising temperatures, climate-related policy, and emerging technologies in our changing world.

The Financial Stability Board created the Task Force on Climate-related Financial Disclosures (TCFD) to improve and increase reporting of climate-related financial information.

While many companies have increased their efforts to improve sustainable operations in recent years, and investors are increasingly pursuing Environmental, social, and corporate governance (ESG) integration in their investment decisions, the lack of consistent disclosure and reliable data for assessing, analyzing and tracking progress remains the biggest barrier to disclosure. TCFD was set up to help solve such problems. The UK is expected to move beyond the "comply or explain" approach with the aim of advancing mandatory TCFD consistent disclosure for UK non-financial and financial sectors by 2025, with a significant number of mandatory requirements in place by 2023. Specifically, the regulations outlined in the TCFD Taskforce interim report will cover most sectors of the economy, including listed commercial companies, large UK-incorporated private companies, banks, building societies, insurance companies, UK-authorised asset managers, life insurers, FCA-mandated pension schemes and occupational pension schemes.
