= July 1937 =

Month of 1937

<<	July 1937					>>
Su	Mo	Tu	We	Th	Fr	Sa
				1	2	3
4	5	6	7	8	9	10
11	12	13	14	15	16	17
18	19	20	21	22	23	24
25	26	27	28	29	30	31

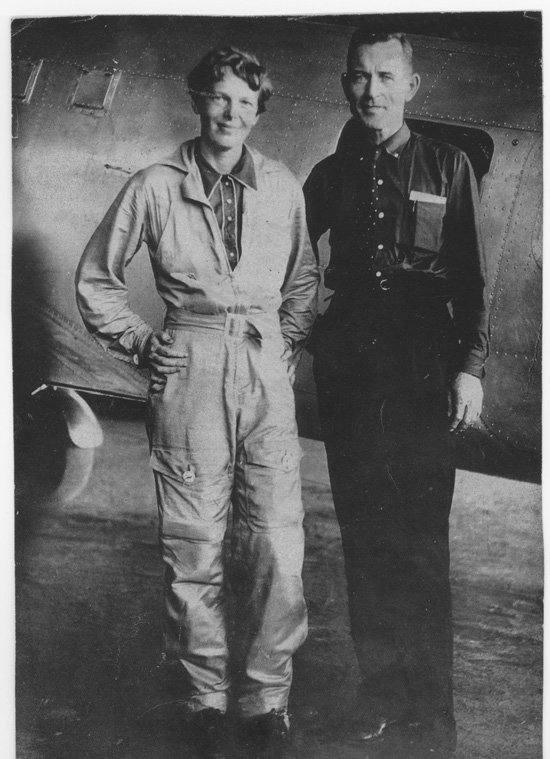
July 2, 1937: Amelia Earhart and Fred Noonan disappear over the Pacific Ocean while attempting to circumnavigate the world

The following events occurred in July 1937:

== July 1, 1937 (Thursday) ==
- Elections were held in the Irish Free State for the 138 seats of the Dáil Éireann, the lower house of the Oireachtas. The Fianna Fáil party of Prime Minister Éamon de Valera won 69 seats, exactly half but one short of the 70 needed for a majority, while the Fine Gael party of W. T. Cosgrave won 48.
- A constitutional referendum was held in Ireland at the same time, as 56.5% of voters approved the new constitution that would come into effect on December 29 and transform the Irish Free State into the Republic of Ireland, with a president replacing the Governor-General and completing the separation of the Free State from the United Kingdom.
- In the Spanish Civil War, the rebel Nationalists of Francisco Franco won the Biscay Campaign against the Republicans of the Spanish Second Republic.
- In Peru, archeologists Julio C. Tello and Toribio Mejía Xesspe rediscovered the ruins of Cerro Sechín in the Casma Province, more than 2500 years after it had flourished in the 16th century BC.
- Roman Catholic bishops in Spain issued a joint letter pledging their support for the Nationalists.
- German authorities arrested Martin Niemöller.
- The MacGregor Arctic Expedition began as an 11-man crew, led by U.S. Weather Bureau meteorologist Clifford J. MacGregor, set sail from Port Newark in the U.S. state of New Jersey, on the schooner A.W. Greely, bound for Nova Scotia in Canada.
- Died: William King, 46, player for the U.S. national rugby union team in 1912 and 1913

== July 2, 1937 (Friday) ==
- Amelia Earhart and navigator Fred Noonan, continuing their attempt to fly around the world, departed from the Territory of New Guinea town of Lae with a destination of Howland Island, a distance of 2,556 miles (4,113 km), with an expected flying time of 20 hours. The two never arrived, disappearing somewhere over the Pacific Ocean .
- In England, the Holditch Colliery disaster killed 30 coal miners, mine inspectors and managers at the Brymbo Colliery in Chesterton, Staffordshire, in England.
- Don Budge of the United States defeated Gottfried von Cramm of Germany in the gentlemen's singles final at Wimbledon.
- The first 24-hour guard for the Tomb of the Unknown Soldier in Arlington National Cemetery was posted at midnight; the changing of the guard has continuously been upheld uninterrupted since.
- At the direction of Soviet leader Joseph Stalin, the Politburo of the Ukrainian Communist Party adopted Decision No. P51/94, titled "on anti-Soviet elements", and "suggesting" that "the secretaries of all provincial and district committees, as well as the representatives of the NKVD of all provincial and district committees and republics, should immediately arrest the criminals who return to their native regions and those who show the most hostile attitude," followed by a directive for the "planned shooting" of 500 criminals dissidents, and the deportation of 1,300 dissidents and 1,700 criminals, including family members to b deported.
- The oldest of Indonesia's wayang wong dance troupes, Ngesti Pandawa, was founded by Sastro Sabdo in Madiun, East Java.
- In Nampa, Idaho, in the U.S., a child set off a fireworks display in the shop window at a drugstore, killing six people and injuring 14 others.
- Born: Richard Petty, American stock car driver, NASCAR Series champion seven times (1964, 1967, 1971, 1972, 1974, 1975, 1979), holder of the NASCAR record for most races won (200); in Level Cross, North Carolina

== July 3, 1937 (Saturday) ==
- Dorothy Round of the United Kingdom defeated Jadwiga Jędrzejowska of Poland, 6–2, 2–6, and 7–5, to win the ladies' singles final at Wimbledon.
- The Marine Parkway Bridge opened in Brooklyn, New York.
- Nikolay Oleynikov, the editor of Soviet children's magazine Sverchok (Cricket), was arrested on charges of being a counter-revolutionary against the Communist Party and the government of the USSR. After four months of imprisonment and torture, he was executed by firing squad on November 24, 1937. On the same day, Aleksandr Arosev, the former Soviet ambassador to Czechoslovakia and Chairman of the Society of Foreign Cultural Relations, was arrested on charges of counter-revolutionary activity; he would be executed on February 10, 1938.
- Born: Li Kwan-ha, the first ethnic Chinese Commissioner of Police for British Hong Kong, from 1989 to 1994; in Xinhui, Guangdong province, Republic of China (d.2017)
- Died:
  - May Sybil Leslie, 49, English chemist known for her work with Marie Curie and Ernest Rutherford in measuring the decay of the radioactive elements thorium and actinium.
  - Jacob Schick, 59, U.S. inventor of the electric razor, died of complications following kidney surgery.
  - Lev Sosnovsky, 51, Soviet journalist and former press secretary of the Central Committee of the Soviet Communist Party, was executed eight months after his arrest on charges of being a member of a "Trotskyist terrorist organization"

== July 4, 1937 (Sunday) ==
- Sir Oswald Mosley led 7,000 Blackshirts, members of his British Union of Fascists in a march from Kentish Town into London's to Trafalgar Square. A group of anti-fascists tried to push past the 2,383 police on hand, but order was generally maintained amid 27 arrests.
- An assassination attempt failed to harm Portugal's prime minister and dictator, António de Oliveira Salazar, who was stepping out of his limousine to attend Sunday mass at a chapel on Barbosa du Bocage Avenue in Lisbon. Although the bomb had been set in an iron case 10 feet (3.0 m) away, the blast did not injure Oliveira. Emídio Santana, an anarchist and founder of the National Syndicate of Metallurgists and leader of the attempted murder, fled to the United Kingdom but was turned back over to Portugal for trial, where he received a prison sentence.
- Representatives of Iran and Iraq signed the Treaty of Tehran, granting Iran some rights to use the Shatt al-Arab strait leading to the Persian Gulf.
- Born: Queen Sonja of Norway, queen consort since 1991 as wife of King Harald V; in Oslo

== July 5, 1937 (Monday) ==
- Hormel Foods Corporation began selling the canned meat product Spam.
- The highest recorded temperature, up to that time, in Canada was measured at Yellow Grass and Midale, both in Saskatchewan as being 45.0 °C (113.0 °F). The record would stand for almost 84 years before being surpassed on June 27, 2021, at Lytton, British Columbia by a temperature of which hit 49.6 °C (121.3 °F).
- Two airlines, Imperial Airways of the UK and Pan American Airways of the U.S., both began test flights with long-range flying boats across the Atlantic Ocean. Imperial's Short Empire airplane, Caledonia, departed from Foynes, County Limerick in Ireland toward Botwood, Newfoundland, flying 1,990 miles (3,200 km) trip in 15 hours and 9 minutes. Pan American's Clipper III, a Sikorsky S-42, had departed Botwood and landed in Foynes, after flying eastward 1,960 miles (3,150 km) in 12 hours and 40 minutes with the benefit of tailwinds. Neither airplane carried passengers or mail, and the two craft passed each other over the ocean. The flight demonstrated that airline passenger service between North America and Europe had become feasible.
- The Battle of Albarracín began in Spain and would continue for more than five weeks until being won by the Nationalists of Francisco Franco on August 11.
- Born:
  - Wolf von Lojewski, German journalist, anchor for the TV news program heute-journal on ZDF; in Berlin
  - Jo de Roo, Dutch bicyclist and winner of the Giro di Lombardia in 1962 and 1963; in Schore,
  - Nita Melnikoff Lowey, U.S. Representative for New York for 22 years from 1989 to 2021 and the first woman to chair the House Appropriations Committee; in The Bronx (d.2025)

== July 6, 1937 (Tuesday) ==
- The Battle of Brunete, a Spanish Civil War battle that which would lead to the deaths of as many as 22,000 dead and wounded over three weeks, was started by the Spanish Republic's forces to protect Madrid from capture by the Nacionalista rebels. When the battle began, the Nacionalistas were only 15 miles (24 km) from the Spanish capital.
- Born:
  - Michael Sata, President of Zambia from 2011 to 2014; in Mpika, Northern Rhodesia (d. 2014)
  - Vladimir Ashkenazy, Soviet Russian pianist and conductor; in Gorky, Soviet Union
  - Ned Beatty, American actor; in Louisville, Kentucky (d. 2021)
  - Gene Chandler (stage name for Eugene Dixon), American singer, songwriter and music producer known for the hit "Duke of Earl; in Chicago
- Died:
  - Carlos Eugenio Restrepo, 69, President of Colombia from 1910 to 1914
  - Paul Dashiell, 69, American sports administrator who reformed U.S. college football while chairman of the Intercollegiate Rules Committee

== July 7, 1937 (Wednesday) ==
- The Marco Polo Bridge Incident occurred in China, after the commander of the Wanping Fortress refused to allow Japanese troops to enter in order to search for a missing soldier, Private Shimura Kikujiro. With Wanping only 10.2 miles (16.4 km) from Beijing, fighting began the next morning at 4:50. The three-day battle marked the beginning of the Second Sino-Japanese War as China's Colonel Ji Xingwen ordered troops to prevent the Japanese from crossing the Marco Polo Bridge to attack.
- Britain's Peel Commission, chaired by Viscount Peel, published a report on the situation in Mandatory Palestine, recommending an end to the British mandate and a partition of the property into an Arab state and a Jewish state.
- The American League defeated the National League 8–3 in the 5th Major League Baseball All-Star Game at Griffith Stadium in Washington, D.C..
- Born:
  - Tung Chee-hwa, Chinese politician and the first Chief Executive of Hong Kong after its transfer from British to Chinese control, from 1997 to 2005; in Shanghai
  - Carroll Hubbard, U.S. Congressman for Kentucky for 18 years from 1975 to 1993, who was later incarcerated for two years for violations of U.S. federal campaign finance laws; in Murray, Kentucky (d. 2022)
  - Nanami Shiono, Japanese historian and novelist; in Tokyo

== July 8, 1937 (Thursday) ==
- Turkey, Iran, Iraq and Afghanistan signed the Treaty of Saadabad, a non-aggression pact, at the Saadabad Palace in the Iranian capital, Tehran.
- The Teatro Gran Rex, the largest cinema in Argentina, opened in Buenos Aires.
- After being summoned to Moscow from Paris, Comintern executive Edward Prochniak, an official with the Communist Party of Poland was arrested upon arrival and charged with being an agent of a Polish anti-Soviet organization. Prochniak was imprisoned for six weeks and would be executed on August 21.

== July 9, 1937 (Friday) ==
- A fire destroyed the film archive of 20th Century-Fox at its film storage facility in Little Ferry, New Jersey, destroying most of the silent films that had been produced by Fox Film Corporation. The blaze, caused by the spontaneous combustion of flammable nitrate film during hot weather, killed one person and injured two others. A film historian would describe the blaze as "the most tragic" nitrate fire in history in terms of the loss of irreplaceable films.
- Chinese diplomat Chen Jie, secretary of the Foreign Ministry, met with Japanese diplomat Hidaka Shinkuoru in an effort to stop an impending war between the two nations with both sides de-escalating the crisis that began earlier in the week with the Marco Polo Bridge incident. Chen's meeting was unsuccessful and a full-scale war broke out shortly afterward.
- The Army of the Republic of Spain recaptured Quijorna from the Nacionalista rebels.
- Hotel and café workers in Paris went on strike for a 5-day work week.
- English golfer Henry Cotton won the British Open, finishing two strokes ahead of England's Reg Whitcombe.
- Born:
  - David Hockney, English artist; in Bradford, West Yorkshire
  - Allan J. McDonald, American aerospace engineer and author known for refusing to sign off on approval, in 1986, of the disastrous launch of the NASA's Space Shuttle Challenger; in Cody, Wyoming (d.2021)
  - Sir Brian Harrison, British historian and editor of the Oxford Dictionary of National Biography.
- Died: Oliver Law, 36, African-American communist and labor organizer, was killed in the Spanish Civil War.

== July 10, 1937 (Saturday) ==
- Chiang Kai-shek made a radio address to millions announcing the Kuomintang's policy of resistance against Japan.
- At Lushan, China's President Chiang Kai-shek hosted exiled Korean leader Ji Cheong-cheon and several other officers of the Korea Independence Party, as well as Kim Won-bong and officials of the Korean National Revolutionary Party, and reached an agreement for the two parties to recruit Koreans to form a united front against the colonial rule of Japan and to fight alongside the Chinese in the Sino-Japanese War.
- As part of the Great Purge in the Soviet Union, 24 people were executed in Siberia after having been convicted on charges of sabotaging Soviet railways.
- A team of seven mountaineers made the first ascent to the top of California's 11,177 feet (3,407 m) high Forsyth Peak in California.
- Born: Francis Schuckardt, right-wing American Catholic bishop who founded and led the Congregation of Mary Immaculate Queen until being expelled, after which he founded the Tridentine Latin Rite Church; in Seattle (d. 2006)

== July 11, 1937 (Sunday) ==
- In the U.S., radio station WGAR, in Cleveland, launched the first major African-American music program, The Negro Hour, which would become nationally broadcast over the CBS Radio Network on January 9, 1938, as Wings Over Jordan
- Rudolf Hasse of Germany won the Belgian Grand Prix.
- Born:
  - Adin Steinsaltz, Israeli Talmud scholar; in Jerusalem, British Mandate for Palestine (d.2020)
  - Hugh R. Nelson Jr., U.S. Army officer who was posthumously awarded the Medal of Honor more than 38 years after being killed in the Vietnam War; in Tuscaloosa, Alabama (d.1966)
- Died:
  - George Gershwin, 38, American composer and pianist, died following surgery for a brain tumor
  - Marcia Van Dresser, 60, American opera soprano
  - Keene Thompson, 51, American film screenwriter known for Six of a Kind and Wives Never Know, died from pneumonia.

== July 12, 1937 (Monday) ==
- The Spanish pavilion opened at the Exposition Internationale des Arts et Techniques dans la Vie Moderne in Paris, featuring Pablo Picasso's mural-sized painting Guernica hanging in the entrance hall.
- American mercenary pilot Harold Edward Dahl was shot down near Madrid and captured by Nationalist forces.
- The comic strip Abbie an' Slats first appeared.
- LIFE magazine published Robert Capa's classic photograph, The Falling Soldier, purporting to show the moment of death of a Spanish Republican soldier in battle, giving the image worldwide circulation. The photo had first been printed in the French news magazine Vu, shortly after it had been taken on September 5, 1936. Its authenticity would be questioned in later years, with the consensus being that it was staged at a location away from battle.
- Piano Concerto in D-flat major, Op. 38, composed by Aram Khachaturian of the Soviet Union and the first concerto to gain Khachaturian recognition worldwide, was performed for the first time, as it was premiered at Sokolniki Park by the Moscow Philharmonic Orchestra conducted by Lev Steinberg.
- Born:
  - Bill Cosby, African-American television actor and comedian, later convicted of rape; in Philadelphia
  - Lionel Jospin, Prime Minister of France from 1997 to 2002; in Meudon, Seine-et-Oise département (now part of Hauts-de-Seine).
  - Michel Louvain (stage name for Michel Poulin), popular Canadian singer; in Thetford Mines, Quebec (d.2021)
  - Xavier Miserachs, Spanish photographer; in Barcelona (d. 1998)
- Died: Jack Curley (stage name for Jacques Armand Schuel), 61, American boxing and pro wrestling promoter, died from a heart attack.

== July 13, 1937 (Tuesday) ==
- Krispy Kreme, a U.S.-based chain of doughnut bakeries throughout the world, was launched by Vernon Rudolph who opened its first location, a store in Winston-Salem, North Carolina.
- The Australian pharmacy chain Amcal (Allied Master Chemists of Australia Limited) was founded by Major General C. H. Simpson and 11 phrarmacists.
- At the age of 33, General Germán Busch became President of Bolivia, who had previously led a coup d'état on May 16, 1936, to overthrow President José Luis Tejada Sorzano, led a second coup to overthrow Colonel David Toro, whom he had installed to replace Tejada.
- Born:
  - Clay Riddell, Canadian entrepreneur and billionaire who founded the Canadian petroleum company Paramount Resources; near Treherne, Manitoba (d.2018)
  - Aron Aronov, Bulgarian opera tenor; in Dupnica (d.2022)
- Died:
  - Dashdorjiin Natsagdorj, 30, Mongolian author and playwright, died of a stroke shortly after being released from prison by the Mongolian communist regime.
  - Victor Laloux, 86, French architect
  - Yevgeni Preobrazhensky, 51, Soviet Marxist economist, was executed.
  - Faina Stavskaya 46, former director of the State Public Historical Library of Russia, was executed.
  - General Mikhail Alafuso, 46, former Chief of Staff of the Soviet Red Army's Moscow Military District, was executed.
  - Vasily Sedlyar, 38, Soviet Ukrainian artist, was executed.

== July 14, 1937 (Wednesday) ==
- Mikhail Gromov, Andrey Yumashev and navigator Sergey Danilin completed a 6,306 miles (10,149 km) airplane flight over the North Pole from the Soviet Union to the United States, landing in San Jacinto, California after departing from Moscow on July 12 in a Tupolev ANT-25, a new distance record.
- The Moscow Canal was opened, bringing the waters of the Volga River to flow into the Moscow River and to provide for the growing capital city's needs. More than 600,000 prisoners were used as forced labor for the construction of the canal, of which almost 23,000 died.
- Chakravarti Rajagopalachari was inaugurated as the new Prime Minister of the Madras Presidency of British India, after being asked by the British Governor of Madras, Lord Erskine, to form a cabinet.
- Born:
  - Yoshirō Mori, Prime Minister of Japan from 2000 to 2001; in Nomi, Ishikawa Prefecture
  - Kevin Connor, English film director known for The Land That Time Forgot and Motel Hell; in Kings Cross, London
- Died:
  - Joseph T. Robinson, 64, U.S. Senator for Arkansas since 1913 and U.S. Senate Majority Leader since 1933, died two days after experiencing chest pains during a Senate session.
  - John "Pudgy" Dunn, 40, American gangster and hitman for the Egan's Rats gang in St. Louis, was shot to death by members of the rival Hogan Gang
  - Julius Meier, 62, American banker, department store magnate and politician who served as governor of Oregon from 1931 to 1935
- Died: Walter Simons, 75, President of Germany's Supreme Court, the Reichsgericht, from 1922 to 1929, acting president of the Weimar Republic from March 12 to May 12, 1925, between the death of Friedrich Ebert and the inauguration of Paul von Hindenburg, and German Minister for Foreign Affairs 1920 to 1921

== July 15, 1937 (Thursday) ==
- The Buchenwald concentration camp was opened by the Nazi German government near Weimar, as prisoners were brought in from camps at Sachsenburg, Lichtenburg and Bad Sulza. Built initially to house 8,000 prisoners, it would have 2,400 by September.
- The German-Polish accord on Upper Silesia signed May 15, 1922 expired. Germany was no longer obligated to provide equality to all citizens in this region and so the Nuremberg Laws immediately went into effect there.
- Born: Wes Wilson, American psychedelic poster artist; in Sacramento, California (d.2020)
- Died: Segis Luvaun (stage name for Louis Thompson), 55, Hawaiian-born American musician and recording artist known as the King of Ukelele Players

== July 16, 1937 (Friday) ==
- Adolf Hitler opened a major art festival in Munich. He made a preview visit to the Degenerate Art Exhibition where a well-known photograph was taken of him passing the Dada wall along with several other Nazi officials.
- String Octet in B-flat major, composed by the late Max Bruch for eight instruments (four violins, two violas, a cello and a double bass, was premiered 17 years after his death, broadcast live from Daventry on the BBC radio network.
- The International Society of Criminology was founded in Rome by Father Agostino Gemelli and Arturo Rocco.
- The second annual Soviet Cup, the knockoout tournament of the Soviet Union's soccer football teams, was won by FC Dynamo Moscow, which defeated FC Dinamo Tbilisi 5–2 before 60,000 spectators at Central Dynamo Stadium.
- Born: John L. Rhodes, American mathematician known for the Krohn–Rhodes theory; in Columbus, Ohio
- Died: Herbert Weir Smyth, 80, American classical scholar known for his compilation of a comprehensive grammar of the Ancient Greek language
  - Vladimir Kirillov, 46, Soviet Russian poet
  - Pavel Vasiliev, 27, Soviet Russian poet and journalist
  - Ivan Makarov, 36, Soviet Russian novelist
  - Mikhail Karpov, 38, Soviet short-story writer. All four writers were shot on the same day at Lefortovo Prison at Moscow the day after being sentenced to death by the Military Collegium of the Supreme Court of the Soviet Union.Russian Literature of the 20th Century: Prose writers, poets, playwrights, ed. by N. N. Skatov — 2005. — ISBN 5-94848-245-6

== July 17, 1937 (Saturday) ==
- The derailment of the Delhi-Calcutta Express train killed 107 people near the town of Bihta in Bihar Province in British India.
- Died:
  - Harriet Chalmers Adams, 61, American explorer and writer for National Geographic magazine
  - Leslie Balfour-Melville, 83, Scottish sportsman who represented Scotland in international play for cricket, rugby union, golf, lawn tennis, and billiards

== July 18, 1937 (Sunday) ==
- The Haus der Deutschen Kunst, an art museum devoted to the ideal works of art in Nazi Germany, opened in Munich with the "Große Deutsche Kunstausstellung" ("Exhibition of Great German Art"). Chancellor Adolf Hitler spoke at the opening ceremony, declaring that "From now on, we will wage a relentless war of purification against the last elements of our cultural decay." Hitler added that "all the mutually supporting cliques of gossips, dilettantes and art cheats will be rooted out and eliminated. As far as we are concerned, these prehistoric cultural Stone Agers and art dabblers may return to the caves of their ancestors, to make their primitive international scribblings there.
- On the first anniversary of the outbreak of the Spanish Civil War, both Francisco Franco and Manuel Azaña addressed the nation on radio.
- Born:
  - Roald Hoffmann, Polish-born American theoretical chemist and 1981 Nobel Prize in Chemistry laureate; as Roald Safran in Zloczow (now Zolochiv, Ukraine)
  - Hunter S. Thompson, American journalist and author; in Louisville, Kentucky (d. 2005)
  - Peter Tishler, American geneticist and researcher; in Boston (d.2021)
- Died: Julian Bell, 29, English poet, died of wounds received at the Battle of Brunete in the Spanish Civil War while working for the International Brigades as an ambulance driver.

== July 19, 1937 (Monday) ==
- The Degenerate Art Exhibition (Die Ausstellung "Entartete Kunst"), organized by Adolf Ziegler and the Nazi Party, opened in Munich at the German Archaeological Institute the day after the opening in Munich of the display of "Great German Art" (Großen Deutschen Kunst). The exhibit, which was free, drew 30,000 people on its opening day, compared to only 10,000 who paid 50 pfennigs to see the exhibit of "great" art. The exhibit featured 650 paintings, sculptures and prints by 112 artists, with examples of what the government defined as items that "insult German feeling, or destroy or confuse natural form or simply reveal an absence of adequate manual and artistic skill". The exhibition would run for seven months until November 30.
- In Switzerland, as the European nation's economy improved, the "Peace of Labor" was signed between four labor unions and two employers associations to seek resolution, "according to the rules of good faith", of potential conflicts and to prohibit strikes and lockouts where possible.
- The Bombay Legislative Assembly opened its first session, inaugurating an autonomous provincial rule in British India for the Bombay Presidency (now India's states of Maharashtra and Gujarat) by a legislature elected by and for natives of India, following the implementation of the Government of India Act of 1935. The 175-member body had 115 elected seats, with the other 60 reserved for various groups. The upper house of the legislature, the 60-seat Bombay Legislative Council, was inaugurated the next day.
- B. G. Kher became the Prime Minister of the Bombay Presidency within British India, succeeding the first person to hold the office, Dhanjishah Cooper. Kher formed the seven-member government at the request of Sir Robert Duncan Bell, the British Governor of the Bombay Presidency.
- Bishwanath Das became the first Prime Minister of the Orissa Province in British India (now the state of Odisha)
- Generalissimo Francisco Franco told royalists in the Spanish Second Republic that the Spanish monarchy might be restored in the event of a Nationalist victory.
- Born:
  - George Hamilton IV, American country musician; in Winston-Salem, North Carolina (d. 2014)
  - General Tiécoro Bagayoko, Malian military officer who directed the secret police of the National Security Services of Mali from 1968 to 1978 to suppress any opposition to the regime of President Moussa Traoré; in Goundam, French Sudan (now the Republic of Mali) (d. 1983).

== July 20, 1937 (Tuesday) ==
- At Patna, Shri Krishna Sinha formed a government as the second Premier of Bihar Province in British India, replacing Mohammad Yunus, who had been appointed in a caretaker role until elections could be held in Bihar.
- Player-manager Rogers Hornsby of the St. Louis Browns played in his final major league game, going 0-for-1 in a pinch hitting appearance during a 5–4 loss to the New York Yankees.
- Born:
  - Ken Ogata, Japanese film and TV actor, three-time Japan Academy Film Prize winner for Best Actor; in Tokyo (d. 2008)
  - Bea Moten-Foster, African-American journalist; in Selma, Alabama (d.2011)
  - Dick Hafer, American conservative author and cartoonist; in Reading, Pennsylvania (d. 2003)
  - Ilie Datcu, Romanian footballer and goal keeper with 13 caps for the Romania national team; in Bucharest

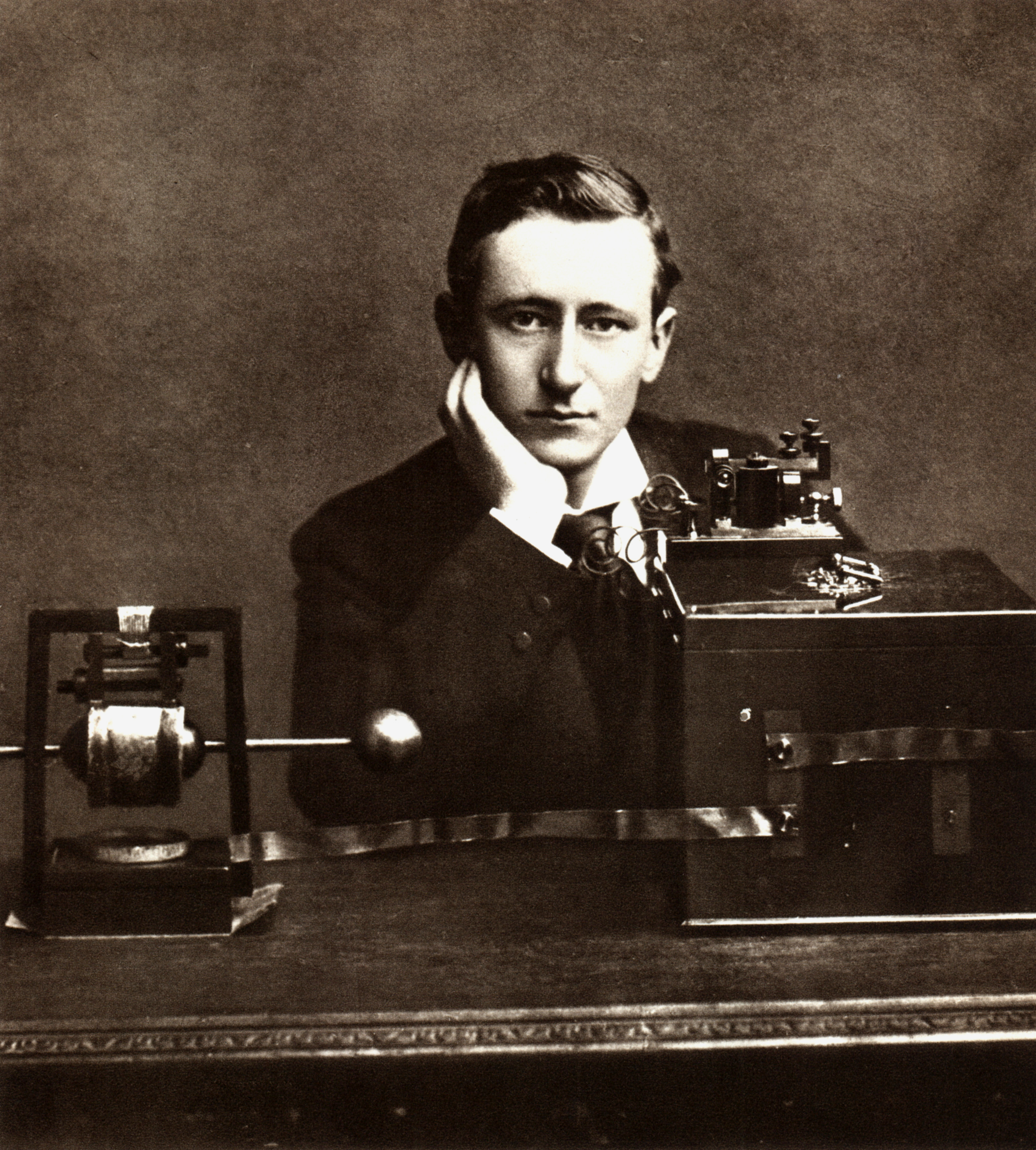
Guglielmo Marconi

- Died: Guglielmo Marconi, 63, Italian physicist and electrical engineer known for his invention of practical wireless communication in the form of telegraphy by radio waves, 1909 Nobel Prize in Physics laureate, died of a heart attack.

== July 21, 1937 (Wednesday) ==
- Éamon de Valera was re-elected President of the Executive Council of the Irish Free State.
- The musical film High, Wide and Handsome starring Irene Dunne and Randolph Scott premiered at the Astor Theatre in New York City.
- Born: Eduard Streitsov, Soviet Russian footballer with 38 caps for the Soviet national team between 1955 and 1968 (died of throat cancer, 1990)
- Died: Rab Howell, 69, English sportsman of Romani descent, footballer for Sheffield United F.C. and the England national team

== July 22, 1937 (Thursday) ==
- U.S. President Roosevelt's Judicial Procedures Reform Bill, called "court packing" by its critics by mandating that an additional justice would be appointed to the U.S. Supreme Court (or another judge to a federal appeals court) would be appointed whenever a member reached the age of 70, was defeated in the U.S. Senate. The vote was only 20 in favor and 70 against, and the legislation was sent back to the judiciary committee.
- In British India, the first joint session of the Bihar Legislative Assembly, primarily composed of natives of India was held as part of the Government of India Act 1935. Bihar was one of several Indian provinces to inaugurate a "home grown" legislature.
- The biographical film The Toast of New York starring Edward Arnold, Cary Grant, Frances Farmer, and Jack Oakie premiered at Radio City Music Hall in New York City. The film was a fictionalized account of the lives of financiers James Fisk (played by Arnold) and Edward S. Stokes (with Cary Grant portraying a character named Nick Boyd.
- Born: Mervyn King, former judge of the Supreme Court of South Africa, chairman of the International Integrated Reporting Council and former Chairman of the Global Reporting Initiative, known for the King Report on Corporate Governance; in Johannesburg
- Died:
  - Kottarathil Sankunni, 82, Indian author who compiled the Aithihyamala, a collection of legends and stories of India's Malayali people
  - Paolo Iashvili, 43, Soviet Georgian writer and poet, went to the Writers' Union office in Tbilisi and shot himself, after being wracked with guilt for his betrayal of fellow author Titsian Tabidze.

== July 23, 1937 (Friday) ==
- The British Parliament passed the Matrimonial Causes Act, liberalizing the country's divorce laws, extending the grounds for dissolution of marriage from one (adultery) to six by adding cruelty, "unlawful desertion for three years or more", "incurable insanity"", incest or sodomy. The bill was given royal assent on July 30 and the law went into effect on January 1.
- The romantic comedy Saratoga, the last film made by actress Jean Harlow prior to her death on June 7, premiered in the United States. Starring Harlow, Clark Gable, Lionel Barrymore, Frank Morgan, Walter Pidgeon and Una Merkel, Saratoga became the second-highest-grossing film of 1937.
- The seven-part radio series Les Misérables adapted by Orson Welles began airing on the Mutual Network.

== July 24, 1937 (Saturday) ==
- Following a debate overnight, the lower house of Yugoslavia's parliament voted, 24 to 22, to approve the Concordat between the Vatican and Yugoslavia, extending privileges given by Yugoslavia's government to the Catholic churches. The move came despite the protests of the Serbian Orthodox Church, including the Serbian church leader, Partriarch Varnava, who died hours later. Violent protests and street demonstrations followed, and the measure never came to a vote before the upper house of the Parliament.
- In Alabama, four of the nine Scottsboro Boys were set free after six years of legal battles.
- The CBS radio network talent show Hollywood Showcase made its debut as a regular series
- Born:
  - Manoj Kumar (stage name for Harikrishan Giri Goswami), Indian film actor and director known for Upkar (1968) and Be-Imaan (1972), winner of seven Filmfare Awards; in Abbottabad, North-West Frontier Province, British India (now part of Pakistan) (d.2025)
  - Betty Loh Tih (stage name for Hsi Chung-i), Hong Kong film actress known for The Enchanting Shadow; in Shanghai, Republic of China (d. of drug overdose, 1963)
  - Quinlan Terry, British architect; in Hampstead, London

== July 25, 1937 (Sunday) ==
- The Soviet Union's Internal Affairs Minister, Nikolai Yezhov, issued NKVD Order No. 00439, directing the arrest of citizens of Germany, including former German citizens who had been granted Soviet citizenship. The order was initially aimed at Germans who worked at railways and in defense industries, whom Yezhov described as agents of the Gestapo and the German General Staff.
- After the Marquess of Linlithgow, the British Governor-General of India refused to consider transfer of India's political prisoners from the "Cellular Jail" on the distant Andaman Islands back to the Indian mainland, all 385 prisoners began a hunger strike, led by Shiv Verma and H. K. Konar. After 36 days, the hunger strike ended and repatriation of the prisoners to mainland India would begin on November 29.
- In the Spanish Civil War, the Air Force of the Spanish Second Republic sent five airplanes to bomb the city of Cáceres. The Republic forces dropped 18 bombs, striking the Nationalists Civil Guard barracks, the town hall and the Mayorazgo Palace, killing 35 people. On the same day, the Battle of Brunete ended inconclusively in Spain.
- La Hora Nacional, one of the longest-running radio programs in the world, was broadcast for the first time by Mexican radio stations, initially on XEDT-AM IN Mexico City. Since its premiere, the one-hour news program has been heard every Sunday night for more than 85 years.
- Roger Lapébie of France won the Tour de France.
- Rudolf Caracciola of Germany won the German Grand Prix.
- Born:
  - Todd Armstrong, American film actor known for potrtaying the hero of the 1963 film Jason and the Argonauts; in St. Louis (committed suicide, 1992)
  - Lee Ki-taek, South Korean politician and president of the Korean Democratic Party, 1991 to 1995; in Cheongha- myeon, Keishōhoku Province, Japanese Korea (d. 2016)
- Died: Charles E. Saunders, 70, Canadian agronomist known for inventing the cultivar for Marquis wheat

== July 26, 1937 (Monday) ==
- Outside of Philadelphia in the U.S., the Herrick HV-2A Vertaplane became the first aircraft to make a transition from being a fixed-wing airplane to an autogyro, capable of vertical takeoff and landing (VTOL), marking the first transition of a "convertible" airplane. Pilot George Townson piloted the flight of the HV-21, which had been designed by Gerald P. Herrick. A second demonstration was made on July 30 before the U.S. Army, the National Advisory Committee for Aeronautics, and newspaper reporters.
- El Salvador quit the League of Nations.
- The Langfang Incident and Guanganmen Incident occurred in China.
- The Orizaba earthquake killed at least 34 people in eastern Mexico.
- Born: Kanayi Kunhiraman, Indian sculptor; in Kuttamath, Madras Presidency, British India (now state of Kerala)
- Died:
  - Jānis Akuraters, 61, Latvian playwright and founder of the Latvian National Theatre.
  - Gerda Taro, 26, German war photographer became the first female war correspondent to die from injuries sustained covering the front lines.
  - Ernst von Delius, 25, German racing driver, died of injuries the day after colliding with British driver Richard Seaman in the German Grand Prix at Nürburg.
  - Carl Minkley, 70, American socialist politician who was elected alderman of Milwaukee, Wisconsin

== July 27, 1937 (Tuesday) ==
- The sale of the British newspaper The Morning Post to the rival Daily Telegraph was announced. The Post was discontinued after 165 years in print and absorbed into the Telegraph.
- Born:
  - Anna Dawson, English TV actress and singer; in Bolton, Lancashire
  - Don Galloway, American TV actor known for being co-star on Ironside; in Brooksville, Kentucky (d. 2009)

== July 28, 1937 (Wednesday) ==
- The infamous defrocked English priest Harold Davidson was fatally mauled by a lion at the Skegness Amusement Park, where he was making a speech in a sideshow act titled "Daniel in the Lions' Den". According to witnesses, Davidson inadvertently stepped on the foot of "a young lioness named Toto" while speaking and "He was pounced upon savagely by her mate, a lion known as Freddie." A 16-year old circus attendant, Rene Somer, dashed into the cage, drove off the lion with a whip and an iron rod, and dragged Davidson out Davidson died two days later. While Davidson was on his deathbed, the carnival promoters in Skegness posted a sign that said "See the lions that mauled and injured the rector, and the plucky girl who went to his rescue."
- Northern Ireland was struck by a wave of bombings in reaction to the one-day visit of the King George VI and Queen Elizabeth of the United Kingdom of Great Britain and Northern Ireland. Although nobody was injured, the bombs by Irish Republicans "wrecked every custom house along the sixty miles of the Ulster-Irish Free State frontier"
- Died: Dr. Belle Reynolds, 96, U.S. physician and American Civil War veteran known for being the first woman to serve as a major in the United States Army

== July 29, 1937 (Thursday) ==
- An elaborate coronation ceremony was held in Cairo for King Farouk I, 15 months after he had become king upon the death of his father, King Fuad I.
- A train derailment killed 25 people south of Paris.
- The Tongzhou mutiny occurred within the East Hebei Army.
- Japanese forces bombed Tianjin, destroying Nankai University.
- Born:
  - Ryutaro Hashimoto, Prime Minister of Japan from 1996 to 1998; in Sōja, Okayama Prefecture (d. 2006)
  - Daniel McFadden, American economist and econometrician and 2000 Nobel Prize in Economic Science laureate; in Raleigh, North Carolina

== July 30, 1937 (Friday) ==
- In the course of the Japanese invasion of China, the Japanese Imperial Army occupied the Chinese port of Tianjin, referred to in the Western press at the time as Tientsin, although the foreign concessions — large sections of the city reserved for France, the UK, the U.S., Belgium, Russia and Italy — were not disturbed.
- Martha Graham's dance solo Immediate Tragedy was given its first performance, premiering at the School of Dance at Bennington College in Bennington, Vermont.
- L. Ron Hubbard's first published novel Buckskin Brigades was released.
- Born: Joseph "Sonny" West, American songwriter and musician known for writing the hit rock and roll songs "Rave On" and "Oh, Boy!" for Buddy Holly; near Lubbock, Texas (d.2022)
- Died:
  - Hans von Rosenberg, 62, German diplomat, Foreign Minister of Germany from 1922 to 1923
  - Alfredo Codona, 43, Mexican-born U.S. trapeze artist who had been the first to regularly perform the triple somersault, fatally shot his ex-wife and then shot himself to death.

== July 31, 1937 (Saturday) ==
- NKVD Order No. 00447, titled ""On the operation of repressing former kulaks, criminals and other anti-Soviet elements," was issued by Soviet Internal Affairs Minister Yezhov as part of the Great Purge by Soviet Premier Stalin. The NKVD allocated the Butovo firing range and the Kommunarka shooting ground to serve as the execution site and mass grave for persons to be eliminated after arrest.
- Died:
  - György Zala, 79, Hungarian sculptor
  - Charles E. Hires, 85, American beverage maker and entrepreneur who created Hires Root Beer in 1876.
