= 1983 Heze earthquake =

Earthquake in Shandong, China

- Location within Shandong Location within China
- UTC time: 1983-11-06 21:09:45
- ISC event: 564438
- USGS-ANSS: ComCat
- Local date: November 7, 1983
- Local time: 05:09:25 (UTC+8)
- Magnitude: 5.7 mb 5.9 M_{s}
- Depth: 19 km (12 mi)
- Epicenter: 35.206°N 115.213°E
- Type: Strike-slip
- Areas affected: China
- Max. intensity: MMI VII (Very strong)
- Casualties: 34 dead 2,200 injured

The 1983 Heze earthquake occurred near the administrative borders between the provinces of Shandong and Henan in the People's Republic of China on November 7, 1983, at 05:09 local time and date. The earthquake had a body-wave magnitude of 5.7 and a maximum intensity of VII (Very strong) on the Modified Mercalli intensity scale. The event caused 34 deaths and injured 2,200 people. More than 3,300 houses were destroyed.

== Tectonic setting ==
The Shandong Plain lies inside the much larger North China Plain, a seismically active alluvial plain riddled with faults and boundaries and home to most of China's most catastrophic earthquakes. In this case, within the eastern regions of Shandong and China lies the Tanlu fault, one of the largest faults in all of Eastern China reaching as far as the Bohai Sea. The Tanlu fault and the Yishu fault were the cause of the 1668 Shandong earthquake with a moment magnitude of 8.5 and the 1937 Heze earthquakes respectively.

== Earthquake ==
The earthquake was said to be a result of a modal plane striking in a Northeastern direction in the plains of the Shandong province. The northeastern direction of the fracture has a velocity of 0.6 kilometers per second, the rupture of the said fault was measured at a length of 3 kilometers. From more calculations it was said that the magnitude of the earthquake was 5.9 on the surface-wave magnitude scale or 5.7 on the moment magnitude scale. The mezoseismal area near the epicenter recorded a maximum intensity VII (Very strong) according to the Modified mercalli scale, and it was said to be felt as far as the Hebei and Henan provinces nearby.

=== Precursor anomalies ===
A month before the earthquake occurred, multiple anomalies and changes along faults near the epicenter were observed. Some anomalies were said to have involved with liquids and hydrochemical elements on the most vulnerable faults in the northern plains of China. Certain spikes of these anomalies were frequent with sudden jumps of observations. Another geological anomaly that was observed was uplift occurring upon 20 km (12 mi) of the plane fault, specifically a maximum uplift of 2.8 mm; slightly above the average uplift of 2 mm. It was later realized that the fault was experiencing multiple soft strains for one year before the mainshock. The straints have also caused minor shocks since the last earthquake in the area in 1937.

== Damage and casualties ==
Damage was observed in the counties of Heze and Dongming in Shandong; 3,300 houses were destroyed. A total of 34 people were confirmed dead and 2,200 people were injured, mainly due to falling debris.

== See also ==
- 1937 Heze earthquakes
- 1668 Shandong earthquake
- List of earthquakes in China
- List of earthquakes in 1983
