= Chen Yujian =

Chinese politician (born 1970)

- 陈宇剑

Vice Mayor of Shanghai
- In office December 2023 – June 2026

Personal details
- Born: February 1970 (age 56) Tancheng County, Shandong, China
- Party: Chinese Communist Party (1992-)

Chen Yujian (Chinese: 陈宇剑; born February 1970 (Note: There are also two other official birth dates: January 1972 and November 1972.)) is a Chinese politician, who was served as the vice mayor of Shanghai from 2023 to 2026. He is a delegate to the 20th National Congress of the Chinese Communist Party.

== Career ==
Chen was born in Tancheng County, Shandong. He was previously served as the deputy general manager of Shanghai Investment Consulting Company, the director of the high-tech industry division, the director of the fixed asset investment division, the deputy chief Economist of the Shanghai Municipal Development and Reform Commission, the deputy district head of Yangpu District, and the deputy district head of Songjiang District. In July 2017, he was appointed as the district head of Songjiang District.

In December 2019, Chen was appointed as the district head of Minhang District.

In December 2023, Chen was appointed as the vice mayor of Shanghai.

== Investigation ==
On 10 June 2026, Chen was suspected of "serious violations of laws and regulations" by the Central Commission for Discipline Inspection (CCDI), the party's internal disciplinary body, and the National Supervisory Commission, the highest anti-corruption agency of China.
