= Schooner A.W. Greely =

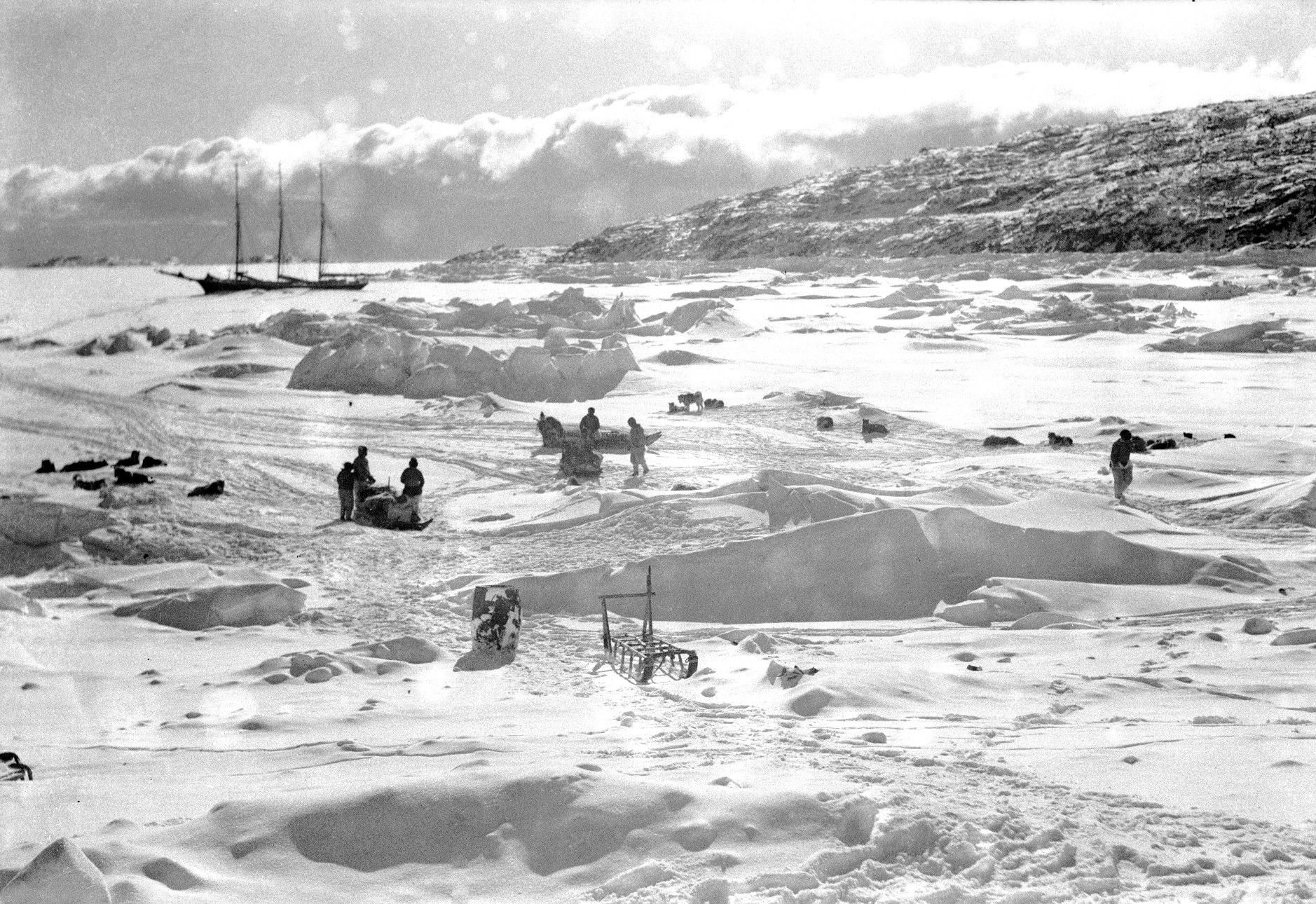
- A.W. Greely frozen in at Foulke Fiordat near Etah, Greenland, 1938

History

United States
- Name: A.W. Greely
- Namesake: Adolphus Washington Greely
- Acquired: by purchase, 1936
- In service: 1937
- Out of service: 1938
- Fate: Sold, 1938

General characteristics
- Type: Schooner
- Tonnage: 200 tons
- Length: 109 ft (33 m)
- Beam: 27 ft (8.2 m)
- Draft: 11 ft (3.4 m)

A.W. Greely was a three-masted wooden schooner that became known for her role in the MacGregor Arctic Expedition, a privately funded expedition to the North Pole between July 1, 1937, and October 3, 1938.

== Donald II ==
She was built as Donald II in 1925 for Hollett and Sons of Newfoundland and measured 200 tons, 109 feet (33 m) long, 27 feet (8.2 m) in beam. The vessel drew 11 feet (3.4 m) of water and was specially reinforced for ice conditions.

Donald II was purchased in 1932 by Master Mariner Captain William Trenholm for use as a merchant ship. With only his daughter for crew, he plied the West Indies route taking down lath and returning to Newfoundland with salt for the cod fleet. Captain Trenholm died on his last voyage on Donald II, leaving his daughter to skipper the ship home by herself.

Owned by Ann Trenholm of Louisbourg, Nova Scotia, by 1937 Donald II was out of service and needed work to be made seaworthy as she hadn't been under sail since her master's death.

== MacGregor Arctic Expedition ==
Donald II was purchased by Clifford J. MacGregor in 1936 for what would become known as the MacGregor Arctic Expedition. Lieutenant Commander Isaac Schlossbach was tasked with bringing the schooner from Nova Scotia to New Jersey. With “Dusty” Dustin, a veteran of Byrd's Second Antarctic Expedition, Captain Frasier Wilcox and H.L. Fleet, they departed Louisbourg late in 1936, with a cargo destined for Boston.

By the spring of 1937 Donald II was in Port Newark, New Jersey where new motors were installed and the vessel reinforced and reconditioned for the expedition. She was rechristened A.W. Greely on 2 May 1937, in honor of Adolphus Greely, leader of the ill-fated Lady Franklin Bay Expedition of 1881 and 1882.

The expedition set sail from Port Newark on 1 July 1937. They made two stops in Nova Scotia: Lunenburg and Sydney, and two stops in Greenland, one at Fairhaven and another at Idglorssuit, Umank Fjord. After departing Idgorsuit the ship encountered ice in Baffin Bay. At the lower end of Robertson Channel they were stopped completely by a wall of ice 15 feet (4.6 m) thick. Unable to proceed further they tried to seek shelter on Ellesmere Island only to find the entire coast blocked with ice. They then drifted south along the coast of Greenland urgently looking for winter quarters as new ice was already forming and there was a danger of being frozen in.

They arrived at Foulke Fiord, near Etah, Greenland, on 31 August 1937. Before the expedition could get settled on land they experienced a series of near disasters which almost settled the expedition at the bottom of the sound. The charts of the area showed 40 feet (12 m) of water. The ship drew 12 feet (3.7 m), but to their surprise they found themselves aground. By unloading some of the supplies they were able to re-float the ship at the next tide. On 1 September 1937 a severe gale blew the ship out to sea, the anchor being unable to hold on the rocky bottom. On the return to Etah, one of the engines backfired, starting a fire aboard ship. There were anxious moments until the fire was extinguished as there was still gasoline, ammunition and dynamite aboard. After two days they were able to get back to Reindeer Point near Etah, only to find that most of the supplies that they had unloaded earlier to re-float the ship were under water, as a 10-foot (3 m) tide ebbed and flowed there.

As was the practice with this type of wooden vessel, A.W. Greely was intentionally allowed to freeze into the ice for the winter of 1937–38. This facilitated the unloading and loading of supplies and the aircraft. When the ice broke in July 1938, the explorers left Greenland. The winter had damaged the schooner more than had been expected, and an ice jam in Baffin Bay held the ship for weeks, drifting with the ice. Several seams opened up, and constant pumping was required for days before reaching St. John's, where repairs were made. During the voyage from St. John's to Newark off the Grand Banks of Newfoundland, on 21 September 1938, they encountered one of the worst hurricanes that had ever moved up the Atlantic Coast, now remembered as the New England Hurricane of 1938. The expedition finally returned to Port Newark on 4 October 1938, having been away fifteen months and four days.

Simon Lake purchased A.W. Greely after the expedition. She ended up in South America, where she was lost during World War II.
