= Tan-Lu fault =

The Tancheng-Lujiang Fault (referred to as the Tan-Lu Fault) is a large fault in eastern China. It was named after it was initially discovered that it starts from Tancheng, Shandong Province in the north and reaches the Lujiang County in Anhui Province in the south. In fact, the northern section of the Tan-Lu fault has been extending along the north-north-east direction through the Bohai Sea and northeast China to the Sea of Okhotsk, with a length of more than 2,400 kilometers in China. Its southern section also once extended to today's Mount Lu for a time.

== Formation ==
The southern segment of the Tan-Lu Faults (south of Tancheng) was formed at the end of the Triassic period as a strike-slip fault east of the Qinling-Dabie collision zone between the Yangtze plate and the Sino-Korean plate. During the Yanshan period of the Mesozoic Era, due to the westward subduction of the Pacific plate under the Eurasian plate (in a broad sense), the Tanlu fault belt extended to the north and was transformed into a thrust fault. Afterwards, although the Tan-Lu Faults was once restored to a strike-slip fault, it was still dominated by thrust movement for most of the time.

During the neotectonic period, the Tan-Lu Faults was a left strike-slip-thrust fault. There have been many major earthquakes along this fault zone in history, such as the Tancheng earthquake in 1668 and the Haicheng earthquake in 1975.

== See also ==
- Seismic fault
- Yangtze Plate
- Tectonics
