= 1937 Heze earthquakes =

Earthquakes in China

- Location within China
- UTC time: 1937-07-31 20:35:51
- 1937-08-01 10:41:09
- ISC event: 903183
- 903185
- USGS-ANSS: ComCat
- ComCat
- Local date: August 1, 1937
- Local time: 04:35:51
- 18:41:09
- Magnitude: 7.0 M_{w}, 6.7 M_{w}
- Depth: 25 km (16 mi)
- Epicenter: 37°04′N 114°29′E
- Areas affected: China
- Max. intensity: CSIS IX
- Casualties: 3,252 dead, 12,701 injured

The 1937 Heze earthquakes struck the Mudan District in Shandong Province, China on July 31 and August 1 respectively. The moment magnitude 7.0 and 6.7 earthquakes were centered near the city of Heze. Although the total number of casualties has never been finalized, at least 3,252 people died and 12,701 were injured. The earthquakes also killed more than 6,000 livestock and destroyed 470,000 homes. Due to the outbreak of the Second Sino-Japanese War, rescue operations by the Chinese government were ineffective.

== Tectonic setting ==
Seismic activity in the North China Plain occur as a result of interaction between three crustal blocks that form the North China Craton. The western part of the craton consists of a continental rift system and the tectonically stable Ordos Plateau. At the center of the block is another rift that forms the North China Plain, and to the east, the Bohai Sea. Several large fault systems bound the North China Craton, including the Tanlu Fault. These faults have generated magnitude 8.0+ earthquakes in the past centuries including the 1668 Shandong and 1679 Sanhe-Pinggu earthquakes. The North China Plain also hosted the 1975 Haicheng and 1976 Tangshan earthquakes.

== Earthquakes ==
The two earthquakes have been often attributed to being triggered along the 230 km (140 mi) Liaokao Fault Zone. The average slip rate along the fault over the past 47 years is measured at 9.24 mm (0.364 in) per year, and it has a strike-slip sense of movement. It is predominantly buried beneath the south-central part of the North China Plain. In the epicenter region, nearby faults lie beneath sediments deposited by the Yellow River. The northern Liaokao Fault Zone was active during the late Pleistocene and presently active along its southern segment. Based on analysing the isoseismal lines, surface ruptures and fault plane solutions, these shocks were likely produced on the Xiaoliu-Xieyuanji and Dongming-Chengwu faults; north-northeast west-northwest trending faults, respectively.

== Precursor events ==
Prior to the mainshocks, residents noted extremely unusual weather patterns in the area. Heavy rains and strong winds battered the region. The region also became unusually hot and humid, where several residents suffered heat injuries, and many livestock died. The temperature was so high that the walls of homes overheated and burned. The water level in wells also fluctuated many times. In some instances, the water rose and overflowed from these wells. Discoloration, bubbling, and foaming of well water were also observed.

A mere two or three days before the earthquakes, animals displayed peculiar behaviors. Swallow flocks did not disperse but slept around the area. Cattle did not consume grass, and horses refused to enter their stables. Mice were observed fleeing the epicenter area, and dogs barked continuously. The residents also reported witnessing glowing red fireballs rising from the ground and into the air. Thunderous sounds were heard coming from the ground.

== Damage ==
In the meizoseismal area where the maximum seismic intensity was assigned IX (Violent), all buildings collapsed and severe liquefaction occurred. The area encompassed the towns of Xieyuanji and Muli Malinggang. From Hezhe; Malinggangzhen to the east; Wubagang and Dongming to the west; Tongguji in the south, and northward to Genghai. Intensity IX covered an area of 82 km^{2}. The second mainshock had a maximum intensity of VIII (Severe).

In all, more than 3,252 people died, 12,701 were injured and over 470,000 homes were destroyed. The earthquakes caused damage in 40 counties across the provinces of Shandong, Henan, Anhui, Jiangsu, and Hebei. Its effects were also felt along the coast of the Bohai Sea, in Beijing, Zhenjiang, and Luoyang. At Xuzhou in Jiangsu, 50 homes collapsed, killing over 20 people. Homes also collapsed in Feixiang and Daming, Hebei Province. Several huts fell in Dangshan County, Anhui.

An estimated 30 percent of all residential homes in Heze were destroyed. Some sections of the city walls and battlements were torn down. The well-known Guanyin Temple also collapsed. Water ejected from the ground through wells. In Dongming County, 20 percent of the county homes were lost. Six people died and ground fissures erupted water. Some fissures were up to one meter wide and were reported as far as 30 km from the epicenter. A farmer fell into one of the fissures and was washed away by rushing water.

== See also ==
- List of earthquakes in 1937
- List of earthquakes in China
