= Miaoshan, Tancheng County =

Miaoshan 庙山镇
- Town
- Location in Shandong
- Coordinates: 34°44′55″N 118°21′55″E
- Country: People's Republic of China
- Province: Shandong
- Prefecture-level city: Linyi
- County: Tancheng County
- Time zone: UTC+8 (China Standard)

Miaoshan (simplified Chinese: 庙山; traditional Chinese: 廟山; pinyin: Miàoshān) is a town in Tancheng County, Shandong province, China. As of 2020, it has 8 rural communities under its administration:

- Miaoshan Community(庙山社区)
- Lichao Community (立朝社区)
- Mazhan Community (马站社区)
- Lequan Community (乐泉社区)
- Qianlin Community (前林社区)
- Dabu Community (大埠社区)
- Xincheng Community (新城社区)
- Xuezhuang Community (薛庄社区)

== See also ==
- List of township-level divisions of Shandong
