= Murray A. Wiener =

Murray A. Wiener (1909 – 1993) was a polar explorer and photographer.

== Early years ==
Wiener grew up in Bradley Beach, New Jersey and graduated from the University of Missouri in 1935. Wiener worked for Universal Studios.

== Polar exploration ==
Wiener served as photographer for the MacGregor Arctic Expedition (1937–1938). Wiener was auroral observer at West Base for the United States Antarctic Service Expedition (1939–1941). Wiener accompanied Admiral Byrd on three additional Antarctic Expeditions: Operation Highjump (1946–1947); Operation Deep Freeze I (1955–1956) and Operation Deep Freeze II. He served on Richard Evelyn Byrd's personal staff and became the United States leading expert on polar survival.

== Military service ==
Wiener was a US Army Captain and observer with air sea rescue on Mount Olympia during World War II. Major, Murray A. Wiener of Alexandria, Va. a 3-time visitor to the bottom of the world, was (15 Dec. 1955) air force adviser on the staff of Admiral Byrd. In 1956, Murray was a major in the United States Air Force.

== Sources ==
- Inglis, Robert: "A Scout Goes North", 1938
- Sallach, David L.: "NJ Historical Commission Newsletter", February 1977
- Vogel, Hal: "Ice Cap News", Nov-Dec 1977
- Vogel, Hal: "They Brought Their Own Storms", 1977
