= Roy Fitzsimmons =

American explorer

Roy at the helm of the schooner A.W.Greely, 1938

Roy G. Fitzsimmons (1916 – May 5, 1945) was an American Polar Explorer and Geophysicist. Born LeRoy Fitzsimmons, he was the youngest child of John and Alice Brown Fitzsimmons and was one of 10 children.

Roy graduated from Seton Hall College in 1937 with a Physics degree. He was trained in Magnetometry by the Carnegie Institution. He served as Geophysicist and Magnetologist on the MacGregor Arctic Expedition July 1, 1937 through October 4, 1938. He was a member of the United States Antarctic Service Expedition (Byrd's third expedition) 1939 through 1941 where he worked at West Base on magnetometry, aurora studies and seismology in the Rockefeller Mountains where a peak bears his name.

During World War II Roy was a captain in the United States Army Air Forces. He was killed on May 5, 1945, while returning from active duty in Cuba. He is buried in Newark NJ. His survivors included six nieces and nephews.

== Sources ==
- Inglis, Robert: "A Scout Goes North", 1938
- MacGregor, Clifford J.: "Monthly Weather Review", October 1939
- Vogel, Hal: "Ice Cap News", Nov–Dec 1977
- Vogel, Hal: "They Brought Their Own Storms", 1977
- Inglis, Robert: "Rutgers University Oral History Archives" October 27, 1998
- Stonehouse, 'Bernard: "The Encyclopedia of Antarctica and the Southern Oceans", 2002
