= List of earthquakes in 1937 =

Earthquakes in 1937
Approximate epicenters of the earthquakes in 1937
- 4.0–5.9 magnitude
- 6.0–6.9 magnitude
- 7.0–7.9 magnitude
- 8.0+ magnitude
- Strongest: China, Qinghai Province (Magnitude 7.8) January 7
- Deadliest: China, Shandong Province (Magnitude 6.9) July 31 390 deaths
- Total fatalities: 497

Number by magnitude
- 9.0+: 0

This is a list of earthquakes in 1937. Only magnitude 6.0 or greater earthquakes appear on the list. Lower magnitude events are included if they have caused death, injury or damage. Events which occurred in remote areas will be excluded from the list as they wouldn't have generated significant media interest. All dates are listed according to UTC time. The death toll of 497 was the lowest since 1921. China once again bore the brunt of the deadly events. The largest magnitude event was a 7.8 in January in China. Activity was fairly scattered across the planet with China, Dutch East Indies, Mexico, South America, the southern Pacific Ocean islands and Alaska seeing large (7.0+ magnitude) events.

== Overall ==
=== By death toll ===
Rank	Death toll	Magnitude	Location	MMI	Depth (km)	Date
1	390	6.9	China, Shandong Province	IX (Violent)	25.0	July 31
2	51	5.0	China, Shanxi Province	VII (Very strong)	0.0	September 15
3	34	7.3	Mexico, Veracruz	( )	90.0	July 26
4	15	6.3	Peru, Pasco Region	X (Extreme)	15.0	December 24

- Note: At least 10 casualties

=== By magnitude ===
Rank	Magnitude	Death toll	Location	MMI	Depth (km)	Date
1	7.8	0	PRC, Qinghai Province	X (Extreme)	15.0	January 7
2	7.5	1	Philippines, Luzon	VIII (Severe)	15.0	August 20
= 3	7.4	0	Russian SFSR, Kuril Islands	( )	30.0	February 21
= 3	7.4	4	Mexico, Guerrero	( )	25.0	December 23
= 4	7.3	0	Fiji	( )	330.0	April 16
= 4	7.3	34	Mexico, Veracruz	( )	90.0	July 26
= 4	7.3	0	United States, Andreanof Islands, Alaska	( )	120.0	September 3
= 5	7.2	0	British Solomon Islands	( )	15.0	January 25
= 5	7.2	0	United Kingdom, South Sandwich Islands	( )	95.0	September 8
= 5	7.2	0	Afghanistan, Badakhshan Province	VII (Very strong)	200.0	November 14
= 6	7.1	0	Peru, off the coast of northern	( )	30.0	June 21
= 6	7.1	0	Ecuador, Pastaza Province	( )	175.0	July 19
= 6	7.1	0	Dutch East Indies, Bali Sea	( )	610.0	August 11
7	7.0	0	United States, central Alaska	VIII (Severe)	10.0	July 22

- Note: At least 7.0 magnitude

== Notable events ==
=== January ===
January
- Strongest: 7.8 M_{w} China
- Total fatalities: 0

Number by magnitude
- 8.0–8.9: 0
- 7.0–7.9: 2
- 6.0–6.9: 4

Date	Country and location	M_{w}	Depth (km)	MMI	Notes	Casualties	
Date	Country and location	M_{w}	Depth (km)	MMI	Notes	Dead	Injured
4	New Guinea, West Sepik Province	6.0	35.0				
5	Japan, southeast of Kyushu	6.5	20.0				
7	China, Qinghai Province	7.8	15.0	X	Some damage was reported.		
11	Mexico, off the coast of Oaxaca	6.0	110.0				
12	Nicaragua, Chinandega Department	0.0	0.0		Some damage was caused. The magnitude and depth were unknown.		
23	New Guinea, southeast of New Ireland (island)	6.8	35.0				
25	British Solomon Islands	7.2	15.0				

=== February ===
February
- Strongest: 7.4 M_{w} Russian SFSR
- Deadliest: 5.4 M_{w} French Algeria; 1+ deaths
- Total fatalities: 1+

Number by magnitude
- 8.0–8.9: 0
- 7.0–7.9: 1
- 6.0–6.9: 0
- 5.0–5.9: 1

Date	Country and location	M_{w}	Depth (km)	MMI	Notes	Casualties	
Date	Country and location	M_{w}	Depth (km)	MMI	Notes	Dead	Injured
10	French Algeria, Guelma Province	5.4	0.0	VIII	At least 1 person died and some damage was caused. The depth was unknown.	1+	
21	Russian SFSR, Kuril Islands	7.4	30.0		Some damage was reported.		

=== March ===
March
- Strongest: 6.6 M_{w} Peru
- Total fatalities: 0

Number by magnitude
- 8.0–8.9: 0
- 7.0–7.9: 0
- 6.0–6.9: 5

Date	Country and location	M_{w}	Depth (km)	MMI	Notes	Casualties	
Date	Country and location	M_{w}	Depth (km)	MMI	Notes	Dead	Injured
9	Costa Rica, Puntarenas Province	6.4	20.0				
14	Chile, off the coast of Antofagasta Region	6.4	15.0				
19	Chile, Atacama Region	6.0	70.0				
25	United States, southern California	6.0	6.0	VI			
29	Peru, Moquegua Region	6.6	120.0				

=== April ===
April
- Strongest: 7.3 M_{w} Fiji
- Total fatalities: 0

Number by magnitude
- 8.0–8.9: 0
- 7.0–7.9: 1
- 6.0–6.9: 4

Date	Country and location	M_{w}	Depth (km)	MMI	Notes	Casualties	
Date	Country and location	M_{w}	Depth (km)	MMI	Notes	Dead	Injured
2	Fiji	6.5	600.0				
5	Dutch East Indies, off the north coast of Papua (province)	6.8	15.0				
16	Fiji	7.3	330.0				
29	United States, south of Alaska Peninsula	6.6	35.0	I			
29	Russian SFSR, Primorsky Krai	6.2	370.0				

=== May ===
May
- Strongest: 6.5 M_{w} 5 events
- Total fatalities: 0

Number by magnitude
- 8.0–8.9: 0
- 7.0–7.9: 0
- 6.0–6.9: 7

Date	Country and location	M_{w}	Depth (km)	MMI	Notes	Casualties	
Date	Country and location	M_{w}	Depth (km)	MMI	Notes	Dead	Injured
10	Fiji, south of	6.5	640.0				
13	Dutch East Indies, south of Minahassa Peninsula, Sulawesi	6.2	200.0				
21	Colombia, Cauca Department	6.5	90.0				
28	New Guinea, Rabaul	0.0	0.0	VIII	Some homes were destroyed. This event was part of a volcanic eruption which left 507 dead. The magnitude and depth was unknown.		
28	Mexico, Chiapas	6.5	150.0				
28	Japan, Volcano Islands	6.5	530.0				
31	Dutch East Indies, northeast of Halmahera	6.2	170.0				
31	New Guinea, southwest of Bougainville Island	6.5	100.0				

=== June ===
June
- Strongest: 7.1 M_{w} Peru
- Total fatalities: 0

Number by magnitude
- 8.0–8.9: 0
- 7.0–7.9: 1
- 6.0–6.9: 2

Date	Country and location	M_{w}	Depth (km)	MMI	Notes	Casualties	
Date	Country and location	M_{w}	Depth (km)	MMI	Notes	Dead	Injured
8	Russian SFSR, Kuril Islands	6.5	130.0				
8	Mexico, Chiapas	6.2	200.0				
21	Peru, off the north coast	7.1	30.0				

=== July ===
July
- Strongest: 7.3 M_{w} Mexico
- Deadliest: 6.9 M_{w} China; 390 deaths
- Total fatalities: 424

Number by magnitude
- 8.0–8.9: 0
- 7.0–7.9: 3
- 6.0–6.9: 10

Date	Country and location	M_{w}	Depth (km)	MMI	Notes	Casualties	
Date	Country and location	M_{w}	Depth (km)	MMI	Notes	Dead	Injured
1	Dutch East Indies, north of Simeulue	6.3	30.0				
2	New Hebrides	6.5	35.0				
4	British Solomon Islands	6.5	15.0	rowspan="2"| Doublet earthquake			
4	British Solomon Islands	6.6	15.0				
9	Peru, Arequipa Region	6.0	180.0				
15	Russian SFSR, off the east coast of Kamchatka	6.5	140.0				
18	United States, Fox Islands (Alaska)	6.3	70.0	I			
19	Ecuador, Pastaza Province	7.1	175.0				
21	Russian SFSR, south of Sakhalin	6.0	400.0				
22	United States, central Alaska	7.0	10.0	VIII	Some minor damage was reported.		
26	Mexico, Veracruz	7.3	90.0		34 people were killed in the 1937 Orizaba earthquake. Some damage was caused.	34	
26	Japan, off the east coast of Honshu	6.6	35.0				
31	China, Shandong Province	6.9	25.0	IX	390 deaths were reported and at least 101 people were injured during the 1937 Heze earthquakes. Many homes were wrecked.	390	101+

=== August ===
August
- Strongest: 7.5 M_{w} Philippines
- Deadliest: 7.5 M_{w} Philippines; 1 death
- Total fatalities: 1

Number by magnitude
- 8.0–8.9: 0
- 7.0–7.9: 2
- 6.0–6.9: 5

Date	Country and location	M_{w}	Depth (km)	MMI	Notes	Casualties	
Date	Country and location	M_{w}	Depth (km)	MMI	Notes	Dead	Injured
1	China, Shandong Province	6.7	25.0		This came around 14 hours after the previous deadly event on July 31.		
4	India, Nicobar Islands	6.0	120.0				
5	New Guinea, West New Britain Province	6.6	140.0				
8	United States, Northern Mariana Islands	6.5	120.0				
11	Dutch East Indies, Bali Sea	7.1	610.0				
20	Philippines, Luzon	7.5	15.0	VIII	1 person was killed and 200 were injured. Many homes were destroyed or damaged.	1	200
31	British Burma, Kachin State	6.6	15.0				

=== September ===
September
- Strongest: 7.2 M_{w} 2 events
- Deadliest: 5.0 M_{w} China; 51 deaths
- Total fatalities: 52+

Number by magnitude
- 8.0–8.9: 0
- 7.0–7.9: 2
- 6.0–6.9: 9
- 5.0–5.9: 1

Date	Country and location	M_{w}	Depth (km)	MMI	Notes	Casualties	
Date	Country and location	M_{w}	Depth (km)	MMI	Notes	Dead	Injured
1	New Zealand, south of the Kermadec Islands	6.5	45.0				
3	United States, Andreanof Islands, Alaska	7.2	80.0	I			
4	Fiji	6.5	35.0				
8	United Kingdom, South Sandwich Islands	7.2	95.0				
15	China, Shanxi Province	5.0	0.0	VII	At least 51 people died and many homes were destroyed.	51+	
15	British Solomon Islands	6.7	35.0				
21	Laos, Oudomxay Province	6.0	35.0				
21	Dutch East Indies, Molucca Sea	6.7	50.0				
23	New Guinea, southwest of Bougainville Island	6.9	35.0				
24	Chile, Antofagasta Region	6.0	130.0				
27	Dutch East Indies, south of Java	6.8	55.0	IX	1 person was killed. 326 homes were destroyed and a further 2,200 were damaged.	1	
28	Dutch East Indies, south of Minahassa Peninsula, Sulawesi	6.5	200.0				

=== October ===
October
- Strongest: 6.7 M_{w} Mexico
- Total fatalities: 0

Number by magnitude
- 8.0–8.9: 0
- 7.0–7.9: 0
- 6.0–6.9: 6

Date	Country and location	M_{w}	Depth (km)	MMI	Notes	Casualties	
Date	Country and location	M_{w}	Depth (km)	MMI	Notes	Dead	Injured
5	Mexico, Guerrero	0.0	0.0		Major damage was caused. The magnitude and depth were unknown.		
6	Mexico, Morelos	6.7	35.0				
12	Chile, Antofagasta Region	6.5	110.0				
17	Japan, off the east coast of Honshu	6.5	25.0				
23	New Zealand, Bay of Plenty Region, North Island	6.2	35.0				
27	Chile, O'Higgins Region	6.0	110.0				
29	Afghanistan, Badakhshan Province	6.2	230.0				

=== November ===
November
- Strongest: 7.2 M_{w} Afghanistan
- Total fatalities: 0

Number by magnitude
- 8.0–8.9: 0
- 7.0–7.9: 1
- 6.0–6.9: 5

Date	Country and location	M_{w}	Depth (km)	MMI	Notes	Casualties	
Date	Country and location	M_{w}	Depth (km)	MMI	Notes	Dead	Injured
1	Chile, Antofagasta Region	6.0	75.0				
14	Afghanistan, Badakhshan Province	7.2	200.0	VII	Major damage was caused.		
15	India, Jammu and Kashmir	6.4	30.0				
26	Taiwan, east of	6.0	50.0				
28	Dutch East Indies, off the west coast of Sumatra	6.5	15.0				
30	Italian Ethiopia, SNNPR	6.3	10.0				

=== December ===
December
- Strongest: 7.4 M_{w} Mexico
- Deadliest: 6.3 M_{w} Peru; 15 deaths
- Total fatalities: 19

Number by magnitude
- 8.0–8.9: 0
- 7.0–7.9: 1
- 6.0–6.9: 8

Date	Country and location	M_{w}	Depth (km)	MMI	Notes	Casualties	
Date	Country and location	M_{w}	Depth (km)	MMI	Notes	Dead	Injured
8	Taiwan, Taitung County	6.9	15.0		1 person was hurt and 5 homes collapsed.		1
12	Chile, Antofagasta Region	6.0	60.0				
13	Taiwan, off the east coast	6.7	15.0				
16	Greece, south of Crete	6.5	100.0				
17	Taiwan, Taitung County	6.6	15.0				
18	Uzbek SSR, Tashkent Region	6.5	15.0				
23	Mexico, Guerrero	7.4	25.0		4 deaths were reported.	4	
24	Peru, Pasco Region	6.3	15.0	X	15 people died and some damage was caused.	15	
25	Russian SFSR, Irkutsk Oblast	6.0	35.0				
26	El Salvador, La Libertad Department (El Salvador)	0.0	0.0		Major damage was caused. The magnitude and depth were unknown.		
