= Albert Gerald Sayre =

Gerry loading an antenna

Albert Gerald Sayre (1897 – September 6, 1990) was an American radioman and Arctic explorer.

Gerry served in the United States Navy as a radioman during World War I, and was a commander in the Naval Reserve. He was living in Cornwall-on-Hudson, New York, and working as a teacher at the Storm King School, when he signed on as radio operator for the MacGregor Arctic Expedition of 1937–1938.

After the expedition, Sayre lived in Arlington County, Virginia, and worked as an instructor at the United States Naval Academy. He retired to Milton, Wisconsin, in the 1960s and died, at age 92, on September 6, 1990.

== Sources ==
- Inglis, Robert: "A Scout Goes North", 1938
- MacGregor, Clifford J.: "Monthly Weather Review", October 1939
- Sallach, David L. "NJ Historical Commission Newsletter", February 1977
- Vogel, Hal: "Ice Cap News", Nov-Dec 1977
- Vogel, Hal: "They Brought Their Own Storms", 1977
