= John Johnson (explorer) =

Arctic explorer and World War II veteran

John Johnson was an Arctic explorer and World War II veteran.

Johnson server as cook and mechanic for the MacGregor Arctic Expedition (1937–1938).

He was killed while on active duty during World War II.
