= Tancheng County =

Tancheng County 郯城县
- County
- Location of the seat in Shandong
- Coordinates: 34°36′49″N 118°22′02″E
- Country: People's Republic of China
- Province: Shandong
- Prefecture-level city: Linyi

Area
  - Total: 1,195 km^{2} (461 sq mi)

Population (2019)
  - Total: 888,000
  - Density: 743/km^{2} (1,920/sq mi)
- Time zone: UTC+8 (China Standard)
- Postal code: 276100

Tancheng County (simplified Chinese: 郯城县; traditional Chinese: 郯城縣; pinyin: Tánchéng Xiàn) is a county under the administration of the prefecture-level city of Linyi, in Shandong Province, People's Republic of China.

Tancheng is the southernmost county-level division of Shandong Province and borders Jiangsu. It is about 90 kilometres (by road) south of Linyi City, and almost 300 kilometers south by southeast of Jinan, the capital city of Shandong Province. Qingdao on the coast is 250 km. NE of Tancheng. Just over into Jiangsu is Xinyi. Tancheng is the "Hometown of Chinese Ginkgo" (银杏之乡) and "Hometown of Chinese Tamarix" (中国杞柳之乡).

The population in 2024 was 1,040,775. The land area of the county is about 1,306.58 square kilometres. It is a developing city in a rural area. Tancheng is famous for its ginkgo trees.

== Administrative divisions ==
As of 2012, this county is divided to 11 towns and 6 townships.

Towns

- Tancheng (郯城镇)
- Matou (马头镇)
- Chongfang (重坊镇)
- Lizhuang (李庄镇)
- Chudun (褚墩镇)
- Yangji (杨集镇)
- Huangshan (黄山镇)
- Gangshang (港上镇)
- Gaofengtou (高峰头镇)
- Miaoshan (庙山镇)
- Shadun (沙墩镇)

Townships

- Shengli Township (胜利乡)
- Xincun Township (新村乡)
- Huayuan Township (花园乡)
- Guichang Township (归昌乡)
- Honghua Township (红花乡)
- Quanyuan Township (泉源乡)

== Climate ==
Climate data for Tancheng, elevation 36 m (118 ft), (1991–2020 normals, extremes 1991–present)
Month	Jan	Feb	Mar	Apr	May	Jun	Jul	Aug	Sep	Oct	Nov	Dec	Year
Record high °C (°F)	16.3 (61.3)	24.2 (75.6)	29.7 (85.5)	31.8 (89.2)	36.4 (97.5)	38.4 (101.1)	38.6 (101.5)	37.4 (99.3)	35.2 (95.4)	32.9 (91.2)	27.3 (81.1)	18.8 (65.8)	38.6 (101.5)
Mean daily maximum °C (°F)	5.3 (41.5)	8.5 (47.3)	14.1 (57.4)	20.6 (69.1)	25.9 (78.6)	29.9 (85.8)	31.0 (87.8)	30.4 (86.7)	26.9 (80.4)	21.7 (71.1)	14.1 (57.4)	7.4 (45.3)	19.7 (67.4)
Daily mean °C (°F)	0.2 (32.4)	3.0 (37.4)	8.1 (46.6)	14.5 (58.1)	20.1 (68.2)	24.4 (75.9)	26.8 (80.2)	26.1 (79.0)	21.7 (71.1)	15.8 (60.4)	8.7 (47.7)	2.2 (36.0)	14.3 (57.8)
Mean daily minimum °C (°F)	−3.7 (25.3)	−1.2 (29.8)	3.2 (37.8)	9.0 (48.2)	14.7 (58.5)	19.8 (67.6)	23.6 (74.5)	22.9 (73.2)	17.8 (64.0)	11.1 (52.0)	4.3 (39.7)	−1.8 (28.8)	10.0 (50.0)
Record low °C (°F)	−15.4 (4.3)	−13.1 (8.4)	−7.7 (18.1)	−2.2 (28.0)	3.3 (37.9)	10.9 (51.6)	15.8 (60.4)	12.7 (54.9)	8.0 (46.4)	0.5 (32.9)	−10.7 (12.7)	−15.5 (4.1)	−15.5 (4.1)
Average precipitation mm (inches)	14.6 (0.57)	20.5 (0.81)	30.1 (1.19)	42.3 (1.67)	69.5 (2.74)	99.6 (3.92)	221.6 (8.72)	205.5 (8.09)	82.6 (3.25)	36.4 (1.43)	30.2 (1.19)	16.9 (0.67)	869.8 (34.25)
Average precipitation days (≥ 0.1 mm)	4.1	4.7	4.9	6.8	7.4	7.5	13.0	12.2	7.6	5.3	5.2	4.1	82.8
Average snowy days	3.1	2.9	0.9	0.1	0	0	0	0	0	0	0.4	1.6	9
Average relative humidity (%)	67	65	63	64	68	71	83	84	78	73	70	68	71
Mean monthly sunshine hours	142.2	145.3	188.7	212.3	224.3	189.6	181.5	182.9	174.7	172.4	148.1	148.0	2,110
Percentage possible sunshine	45	47	51	54	52	44	42	44	47	50	48	49	48
Source: China Meteorological Administration

== Historical events ==
=== Visit by Confucius ===
A visit by Confucius to Tancheng had been kept alive in local memory. A temple and shrines marked the locations where Confucius was said to have been seen. The episode is described in the ancient Tso-chuan commentary on the Spring and Autumn Annals, a classic text of China. It apparently tells of the journey by Confucius circa 524 B.C. from his home in Lu to the former state of T'an, to consult and study with the Viscount of T'an, also called T'an-tzu. Qufu was capital of Lu. Tancheng claims being then the capital of T'an.

=== 6th century poet ===
Xu Ling was born in Tancheng county. His reputation as a poet was established in his youth. Later at the court of the Liang dynasty in south China, he compiled the anthology New Songs from the Jade Terrace.

=== 17th century life ===
Tancheng in the 17th century is the setting for Jonathan Spence's multi-layered microhistory. It contains an idiosyncratic narrative, many social vignettes, and several criminal cases: The Death of Woman Wang (1978).

==== Local writings ====
Spence draws on three sources for Tancheng. The first two authors, also magistrates, came to Tancheng from other provinces and are described below. The third and most well known is from nearby Tancheng.

- Local History of T'an-ch'eng (1673), edited by Feng K'o-ts'an.
- A complete Book concerning Happiness and Benevolence, which Spence describes as "a personal memoir and handbook on the office of magistrate compiled in the 1690s by the scholar-official Huang Liu-hung".
- Strange Stories written in the Liao studio by P'u Sung-ling (1640-1715). These are sad and true stories and contrarian essays of the time and place. The author P'u "lived a little to the north in Tzu-ch'uan county, separated from T'an-ch'eng by a range of bandit-infested hills".

==== Two magistrates ====
Feng

In 1668 Feng K'o-st'an arrived in Tancheng from Fukien as the new magistrate. This was the year of the Great Tancheng earthquake. Its calamitous effects greatly complicated the situation he faced.

Although Feng was a "chin-shih", an 'advanced scholar', his experiences in Tancheng were not fortunate. He was dismissed from office in 1670. His Local History took a long view of Tancheng, recording that it was "suffering for fifty years" from the 1622 White Lotus uprisings, which arose during times of drought, locusts, famine, sickness, and assorted banditry. People hurt, and despaired. In 1643 "Manchu troops under General Abatai" invaded Tancheng and "killed tens of thousands". In 1644 the Ming dynasty collapsed.

Huang

In 1670 the scholar Huang Liu-hung arrived in Tancheng as the next magistrate. From Honan, it was his first posting. The people of Tancheng told him that the region had for many years been "destitute and ravaged". He found the people struggling for bare survival. They were also "unusually superstitious". It was very difficult to raise morale. The social fabric had begun to fray. To counter the "decades of catastrophes", Huang attempted to grant generous "tax concessions" and "corvée labor rebates", but adequate approval by the Peking government was not forthcoming. Huang's duties were various, including criminal trials (see below).

==== 1668 earthquake ====
The Great Tancheng Earthquake (pinyin: Tánchéng dìzhèn) is also known as the 1668 Shandong earthquake. At an estimated magnitude M8.5, probably it was the largest seismic event ever recorded for eastern China. The epicenter is thought to have been northeast of Linyi city.

P'u wrote about the quake. He and his cousin were drinking wine in lamp light, when the roar came at them. The table rocked, spilled the wine. Roof beams and pillars "began to snap". Houses would "collapse and, as it were, rise up again". The "screams of men and women" they heard; the din of dogs and roosters. An hour later came a calm. Excited people in the streets at night, half dressed, shared earthquake stories.

==== 1672 murder trial ====
A day-laborer Jen and his father filed a complaint at the Yamen in Tan-ch'eng. They alleged their neighbor Kao killed Jen's wife the woman Wang, while in an adulterous affair. The case came before Magistrate Huang Liu-hung (see above). Kao and his wife were put in the grim city prison. Thus ended day one of proceedings.

Day two Jen testified that he awoke at night to see Kao with a knife lead his wife away. He followed them to Kao's house where Kao's wife awaited. Afraid, Jen left. Kao denied the adultery and murder. His wife Ts'ao offered an alibi per the village night watchmen. Huang released Kao and Ts'ao, and imprisoned Jen and his father.

Huang rode out to the village on day three. At Jen's house, he saw extreme poverty. Also found was dried human excrement by the bed. A woman examined the body of woman Wang, finding on her neck massive bruises. The watchmen confirmed Ts'ao's alibi. Back in Tan-ch'eng Huang put Jen and his father inside the City God's temple that night. There Jen said that "it was he, Jen, who deserved to die."

On day four Jen confessed. Thus his father had falsely accused the innocent, a serious crime. Finding mitigation, Huang let him go. Jen was sentenced to a potentially fatal beating and to wearing the cangue around his neck. The woman Wang, it was feared, might haunt the village as a hungry ghost. Burial in a good coffin near her home may pacify her spirit, Huang felt.
