= Mervyn King (judge) =

South African corporate attorney (born 1937)

Mervyn Mau E. King
- Born: Mervyn Masiapa Mau Eldred King; 22 July 1937 (age 89); Johannesburg
- Occupations: Attorney, arbitrator, mediator, commission chair
- Known for: King Report on Corporate Governance

Mervyn Eldred King (born 22 July 1937, Johannesburg) is a South African corporate attorney, arbitrator, mediator, corporate director, commission chair, author and speaker. A former judge of the Supreme Court of South Africa, he is currently chairman of the IIRC, chairman emeritus of the Global Reporting Initiative and director of the Association of Business Administrators of Southern Africa. He is best known for chairing the King Committee on Corporate Governance, which issued three comprehensive reports in 1994, 2002 and 2009 endorsing an integrated and inclusive approach to corporate governance in South Africa.

== Biography ==
King was born on 22 July 1937 to Aubrey and Mona King. He attended the University of the Witwatersrand, where he earned his Bachelor of Arts, Bachelor of Law, and a higher diploma in tax law.

From 1961 to 1964 he was a practising attorney. From 1965 to 1979 he was an advocate to the Supreme Court of South Africa, specialising in commercial law; he was appointed senior counsel in 1975. He became a judge of the Supreme Court of South Africa in 1977. He resigned that post in 1980 – reportedly after an altercation with Prime Minister P. W. Botha – and entered the commercial arena.

He became executive chairman of Frame Group Holdings, a textile giant, and executive chairman of First National Bank's corporate and investment banking group. In later years, he chaired and was a director of Capital Alliance Ltd and Metro Cash & Carry Ltd.

From 1981 to 1989 he was the first chairman of Operation Hunger, a South African charity which aimed to feed children in rural areas; he is now honorary life president of that organisation.

=== Arbitrator and mediator ===
King is a founding member of the Arbitration Foundation of Southern Africa. He has acted as a company inspector and commissioner of inquiry into the affairs of companies, and has chaired many meetings to effect compromises for company creditors and on behalf of shareholder interests. In 1994 he chaired a commission of inquiry into political divisions in athletics, drafting recommendations for future conduct of the sport in South Africa; this was followed up by his second commission investing the sport of tennis.

=== King Report ===
In July 1993 the Institute of Directors in South Africa asked King to chair the first official committee on corporate governance. The King Committee on Corporate Governance issued its first report (King I), a comprehensive code of corporate practices and conduct, in 1994. King viewed the committee as an opportunity to educate the recently democratized South African public on the principles of working in a free economy. King I was the first report of its kind in South Africa. In 2002, when the Earth Summit was held in Johannesburg, King pushed for a revision of the report (King II), including new sections on sustainability, the role of the corporate board, and risk management. The report was further revised in 2009 (King III). Compliance with the King Reports is a requirement for companies listed on the Johannesburg Stock Exchange. The King Report on Corporate Governance has been cited as "the most effective summary of the best international practices in corporate governance".

=== International arena ===
From 2000 to 2008, King was the South African representative on the International Chamber of Commerce's International Court of Arbitration in Paris. He was the first president of the Commonwealth Association of Corporate Governance and a former Governor of the International Corporate Governance Network.

He is currently a member of the Private Sector Advisory Group to the World Bank on Corporate Governance and a member of the international advisory boards of Stern Stewart (US), Tomorrow's Company (United Kingdom), and the Central European Corporate Governance Association. He chairs the Asian Centre of Corporate Governance, the United Nations Committee on Governance and Oversight, and the Global Reporting Initiative. He is the Chairman of the International Integrated Reporting Council.

In South Africa, King holds the following positions:

- Director of JD Group Limited (since 1995)
- Director of Brait Societe Anonyme (since 1998)
- Director of Strate, the settlement arm for equity trading in South Africa (since 1999)
- Director of the Association of Business Administrators of Southern Africa (since 2004)
- President of the Advertising Standards Authority
- First vice-president of the Institute of Directors Southern Africa
- Chairman of the Automobile Association of South Africa
- Chairman of the Appeal Committee of the United Cricket Board of South Africa
- Member of the Securities Regulation Panel (which oversees all acquisitions and mergers in South Africa)

=== Speaker ===
King has addressed conferences and lectured on corporate issues in 38 countries. He is a regular speaker on radio and television talk shows and had his own television series, "King on Governance".

== Honors and awards ==
- 2010: International Association of Business Communicators Africa Excel Award
- 2010: Honorary doctorate from the University of the Witwatersrand

== Family ==
King is married to Elizabeth Mae Miller; they have two sons.

== Bibliography ==
- Public Policy and the Corporation. Chapman and Hall. 1977. ISBN 0-470-99263-8.
- The Taxation of Income from Capital: A Comparative Study of the United States, the United Kingdom, Sweden, and West Germany. University of Chicago Press. 1984. ISBN 0-226-43630-6. (with Don Fullerton)
- The Corporate Citizen: Governance for all entities. Penguin Books. 2006. ISBN 0-14-302508-2.
- Transient Caretakers: Making life on earth sustainable. Pan Macmillan. 2009. ISBN 978-1-77010-162-3. (with Teodorina Lessidrenska)
