= William King (rugby union) =

American rugby union player (b. 1890)

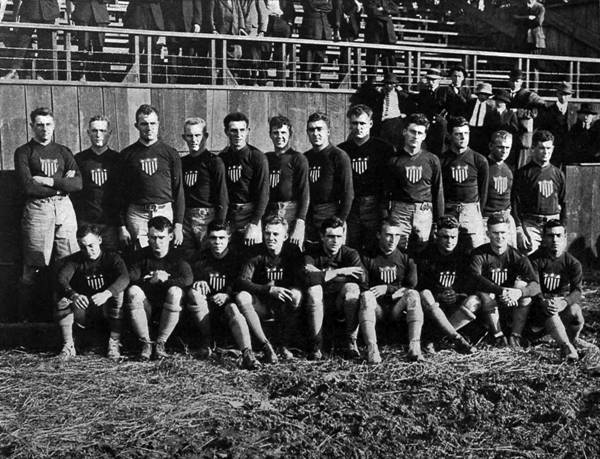
- King with the US team in 1912 (pictured back row, third from left)
- Full name: William Norris King
- Born: December 3, 1890 San Mateo, California
- Died: July 1, 1937 (aged 46)
- University: University of California

Rugby union career
- Position(s): Back row Lock
Amateur team(s)
Years	Team	Apps	(Points)
1910–1914	University of California		
- Correct as of November 3, 2018
International career
Years	Team	Apps	(Points)
1912–1913	United States	2	(0)
- Correct as of November 3, 2018

William Norris King (December 3, 1890 – July 1, 1937) was an American rugby union player who played in the back row for the United States men's national team in its first two capped matches in 1912 and 1913.

== Biography ==
William King was born on December 3, 1890 in San Mateo, California, the son of Frederic Randolph King and Edith King (born Boswell). He was the grandson of minister and noted orator, Thomas Starr King.

As a freshman at the University of California, King was a member of the varsity rugby team. While at the university, King played primarily at lock. On November 16, 1912, King played for the United States at flanker in its first capped match against Australia—a 12–8 loss. On November 15, 1913, King returned to the United States team, playing at number eight against New Zealand—a 51–3 defeat. By August 1914, King had withdrawn from the University of California and was consequently no longer a member of the rugby team.

After attending the University of California and playing for the United States team, King became a rancher. William King died on July 1, 1937, at the age of 46.
