= Bea Moten-Foster =

American journalist

- Born: July 20, 1937; Selma, Alabama
- Died: April 9, 2011 (aged 73)

Bea Moten-Foster (1937–2011) was a pioneering radio journalist in the United States, and founder and publisher of the Muncie Times, an African-American newspaper that served Muncie and surrounding cities. In addition to her newspaper work, Moten-Foster is remembered as the first African American to broadcast from the United Nations, the first African American woman radio announcer in Indianapolis, and the first African American woman to host a television show in Indianapolis.

== Early life and radio career ==
Moten-Foster was born Beatrice Moten in Selma, Alabama, on July 20, 1937. Her first job was picking cotton. In the 1960s she participated in the civil rights movement and was arrested in Talladega, Alabama for riding at the front of a bus.

Upon graduating from high school, Moten-Foster moved to Birmingham and began her career as a radio journalist. She subsequently moved to Miami, where she co-hosted an all-night jazz show with Flip Wilson on radio station WFAB. After WFAB changed to an all-Spanish-language format, she moved to New York City.

From 1965 to 1969, Moten-Foster hosted a radio show on WNJR called "African Profiles," in which she profiled over 65 African diplomats. In this capacity, she was the first African American to broadcast from the United Nations.

== Indianapolis career ==
Moten-Foster served as the first Black woman radio announcer in Indianapolis. Moten-Foster initially moved to Indianapolis in an effort to reconcile with her first husband, who had moved there.

In the 1970s, Moten-Foster served as chair of the Indianapolis Black Bicentennial Committee. The Committee, established in 1975, was part of a broader upsurge in interest in Black history in Indiana during the 1970s. The committee intended to publish two books, but the project stalled and Moten-Foster instead completed one of the books, a cookbook, herself.

Moten-Foster's resulting 1976 book 200 Years of Black Cookery is remembered as an example of the renaissance in African-American cuisine in the 1970s. The book built upon her experiences as a UN reporter in the 1960s, when she collected African recipes from many diplomats.

In 1989, Moten-Foster became the announcer of a television show on WFBM-TV, the Bea Moten-Foster Show, making her the first Black woman television announcer in Indianapolis.

== Muncie career ==
Moten-Foster moved from Indianapolis to Muncie in the early 1980s, subsequently marrying a Ball State University professor named Robert O. Foster. In 1991, Moten-Foster founded the Muncie Times, with an initial budget for the project was fifty dollars. It was the first Black paper serving Muncie to last for more than a few months.

By the late 1990s, the Times had a circulation of about 8000, reaching 10,000 by 2011. It was published twice a month.

Moten-Foster was honored as a Sagamore of the Wabash on multiple occasions, including by Evan Bayh. She was also honored as Outstanding Businessperson of the Year by the Indiana Chamber of Commerce in 1996.

== Death and legacy ==
Moten-Foster died April 9, 2011. Her husband Robert O. Foster had died approximately three weeks earlier. Moten-Foster's death was remarked upon, among others, by then-United States Representative Mike Pence, who read a memorial to her on the House floor.

On Moten-Foster's death, ownership of the Muncie Times passed to Moten-Foster's daughter Rev. Pamela Emmanuel, but it soon ceased publication.

In 2018, a marker was added to the Muncie Walk of Fame honoring Moten-Foster and her husband.

== Works cited ==
- Grant, Sara (1990-04-07). "Channel 11 — your urban independent station". Indianapolis Recorder. p. A4.
- Lake, Jeannine Lee (2011-05-19). "Muncie Times Publisher Bea Moten-Foster, a Muncie institution, dies". Muncie Times. pp. 16, 18.
- Morago, Greg (2015-10-19). "Book explores early contributions of largely forgotten black cooks". Houston Chronicle.
- Moulton, Jane (1981-11-11). "Black cuisine is preserved in cookbook". Cleveland Plain Dealer. p. 4F.
- Pence, Mike (2011-04-04). "Remembering Bea Moten-Foster". Proceedings and Debates of the 112th Congress, First Session. p. 6256.
- "Bea Moten-Foster, Muncie civic leader, dies". Indianapolis Recorder. 2011-04-14.
- Smith, Jessie Carney (2012). Black Firsts: 4,000 Ground-Breaking and Pioneering Historical Events. Visible Ink Press. ISBN 9781578593699.
- Thornbrough, Emma Lou (2001). Indiana Blacks in the Twentieth Century. Indiana University Press. ISBN 9780253337993.
- The Working Press of the Nation, Volume 1. Farrell Pub. Corp. 1998.
