= Herrick HV-2A Vertaplane =

1930s convertiplane

The Herrick HV-2 Vertaplane (Herrick Vertoplane-2) was one of the world's first convertiplanes and was designed by Gerard P. Herrick, a pioneer in the field of VTOL in the 1930s. Herrick's concept called for an aircraft that had a fixed lower wing and an upper wing that could rotate about the vertical axis. The upper rotor wing could be stopped or started both on the ground and in the air. The HV-2 was the first aircraft with an in-flight stoppable rotor to actually use this compound system to generate lift and propulsion in a number of test flights and to perform an in-flight transition.

Modern counterparts using a similar propulsion concept include the Sikorsky S-72 and the Boeing X-50.

== History ==
The main motivation for developing the convertiplane was to build a stall-proof aircraft. Herrick envisioned the rotating wing as a type of parachute to be used in an emergency during critical takeoff and landing phases. To this end, the rotor wing was to be capable of being started or stopped both in flight and on the ground. Herrick's projects, carried out between 1931 and 1937, differed from modern stop-rotor concepts in that the rotor was not actively driven but operated in autogyro mode.

During the development phase, Herrick changed the name of his aircraft several times, using the designations Vertoplane, Vertaplane, Convertoplane, and Convertaplane. The Convertible Aircraft Congress also referred to him as the father of the convertiplane when awarding him a plaque for his life's work.

== HV-1 ==
The HV-1 was the first aircraft designed by Herrick. The single-seater had a 40 horsepower Poyer engine and was equipped with a short-span lower wing and an 11.00 meter diameter teeter-type upper rotor wing on a pylon above the cockpit. The HV-1 prototype had its first flight as a fixed-wing aircraft at Niles, Michigan, on November 6, 1931. Later launches were also made with the rotor rotating as an autogyro, but when the upper wing was launched in flight, it struck the vertical stabilizer and stopped in the position parallel to the fuselage. Although the pilot, Merrill Lambert, was able to bail out, he was killed when his parachute failed to open. The HV-1 was destroyed in the accident.

== HV-2A ==
Herrick, with the help of aeronautical engineer Ralph McLaren, then began construction of a revised variant designated the HV-2A. Like the HV-1, the prototype was built by Heath Aircraft, a small manufacturer of home-built aircraft. The upper wing had a span of only 7.32 m to prevent contact with the vertical stabilizer.

Test flights of the HV-2A were made by 22-year-old George Townson, who had no previous experience with autogyros. He was paid $25 for each flight hour, $12.50 for taxiing hours, and $1.50 each for consulting hours. The first flight as a fixed-wing aircraft was made on October 31, 1936, with subsequent testing at Boulevard Airport in the outer boroughs of Philadelphia. This was followed by initial taxi tests and flights in autogyro mode. The flights proceeded in such a way that the rotor was set in motion by briefly bumping it while stationary, the aircraft then rolled along the periphery of the field to increase the speed of the rotor, finally taxied to the start of the runway and took off into the wind. The flights were all in a straight flight path at a maximum altitude of only about 15 m. The stall speed in fixed-wing mode was 64 km/h and in autogyro mode 56 km/h, demonstrating that the rotor could perform a lift function. Below 56 km/h, vertical descent occurred without stall effects.

Flights at higher altitudes of 400 m and first turns took place between Boulevard Airport and a smaller airfield about 1.6 kilometers away. The first transition between fixed-wing and autogyro configuration took place on July 26, 1937. To do this, the procedure was to tension the rubber cord in the upper wing with two rotor turns and, after takeoff at 80 km/h at an altitude of 45 m, release the upper wing lock. On the first such attempt, Townson struggled with severe oscillations about all three axes that did not subside until the rotor speed reached 250 rpm. This flight is considered the first successful transition of a convertible aircraft. A second successful attempt occurred on July 30, 1937, this time under scrutiny by the media and members of the NACA and military staffs.

Between 1937 and 1939, the year the aircraft was retired, about 100 more transitions were made in the air. The aircraft was then transferred to the National Air and Space Museum, where it was displayed hanging from the ceiling of Building 23 in Silver Hill, Maryland.

== Design ==
The HV-1 and HV-2 concept differed from later designs in that Herrick's rotor was not powered, but operated only in autogyro mode. The HV-2A was powered by a 5-cylinder Kinner radial engine. The lower wing had a Clark-Y airfoil, a structure of wood with plywood planking. The upper wing, also constructed of wood with a Herrick M-7-II airfoil, had double planking. The symmetrical airfoil, with a curved top and flat bottom, had a depth of 1.20 m at the center, tapering to 0.60 m at the wingtips. The fuselage and empennage were fabric-covered and conventionally constructed of welded tubes. The cost of construction was reported to have been $1500.

The rotating surface had no control system and was equipped only with an unlocking lever. In the locked position, the upper wing was oriented parallel to the lower wing; after unlocking, the upper wing began to rotate as a rotor. As with the HV-1, this was mounted on a pivot. A hinge joint allowed a "rocking" motion, i.e., the rotor moved upward when turning toward the nose and downward when turning backward. A hydraulic damping system limited the swings.

In order to start the rotor rotating after the rotor lock was released, even in possible emergencies where rotation was not automatically initiated, the HV-2A had a special Bendix ignition system. This consisted of a small turbine, a drive shaft, and a latch containing a cartridge with igniter. After the latch was opened, the fuze was triggered electrically. The gases from the cartridge, which passed through a tube, drove the turbine, which acted on the drive shaft. This brought the rotor up to a speed of about 60 per minute within a few revolutions. The airstream then ensured that a stable speed of about 250/min was eventually established. However, this emergency system was never used during testing.

If the rotor was already set in rotation on the ground, this was done according to the following procedure: With the help of four people (two at each rotor tip), a rubber cable, which was located in a tube inside the wing, was stretched by turning the rotor backward two turns. The cable was connected to another cable that was wrapped around a drum on the rotor head. After releasing the cable, the rotor accelerated to a speed of about 60 r/min.
