= MacGregor Arctic Expedition =

Promotional Post Card showing Clifford J. MacGregor, Map to Ft. Conger and the Schooner A.W. Greely

The MacGregor Arctic Expedition was a privately funded expedition which set out to reoccupy Fort Conger, Ellesmere Island, Canada, a site within flying distance of the North Pole. The expedition, which took place from July 1, 1937, to October 3, 1938, had four main objectives: To collect weather data; to make a magnetic survey; to photograph the aurora borealis and study its effects upon radio transmission; and to explore the area northwest of Ellesmere Island, in order to clear up the questions about Crocker Land, which Robert Peary placed on the map more than 30 years earlier.

== Preparation ==
In the spring of 1937, a three-mast, tern schooner, Donald II, was purchased in Nova Scotia and brought to Port Newark, New Jersey, where new motors were installed and the ship reinforced and reconditioned for the expedition. It was rechristened the Gen. A. W. Greely on May 2, 1937, in honor of Adolphus Greely, leader of the ill-fated Lady Franklin Bay Expedition of 1881 and 1882.

All expedition members paid their own way either by supplying necessary equipment or cash. There were originally eleven members of the expedition: Clifford J. MacGregor, meteorologist for the US Weather Bureau; Isaac "Ike" Schlossbach, "second in command", navigator and chief airplane pilot, United States Navy (retired); Roy Fitzsimmons, Polar Geophysicist and magnatologist; Robert Danskin, aircraft supplier and geologist; Gerry Sayre, radio engineer and operator; Murray A. Wiener, photographer; John Johnson, cook and mechanic; Paul "Fuzzy" Furlong, mechanic and dog handler; Francis Lawrence, aerologist and Junior Naval Guard; Robert Inglis, Surveyor and Boy Scout (the youngest member of the crew); and Norman Hortman, pilot (who left en route north at Sydney, Nova Scotia).

== En route north ==
The expedition set sail from Port Newark, New Jersey, on July 1, 1937. They made two stops in Nova Scotia: Lunenburg to drop off passengers and take on fresh food and supplies; and Sydney to drop off Norm Hortman and a radio technician who had been tuning the radio equipment and to take on coal. They made two scheduled stops in Greenland, one to take on fresh water and food at Fairhaven and another at Idglorssuit, Umank Fjord to pick up dogs and deliver presents to the Eskimo inhabitants.

After departing Idgorsuit the ship encountered ice in Baffin Bay. At the lower end of Robertson Channel they were stopped completely by a wall of ice 15 feet (5 m) thick. Failing to reach Ft. Conger was a disappointment to MacGregor. Unable to proceed further they tried to seek shelter on Ellesmere Island only to find the entire coast blocked with ice. They then drifted south along the coast of Greenland urgently looking for winter quarters as new ice was already forming and there was a danger of being frozen in.

== Wintering over in Etah, Greenland ==
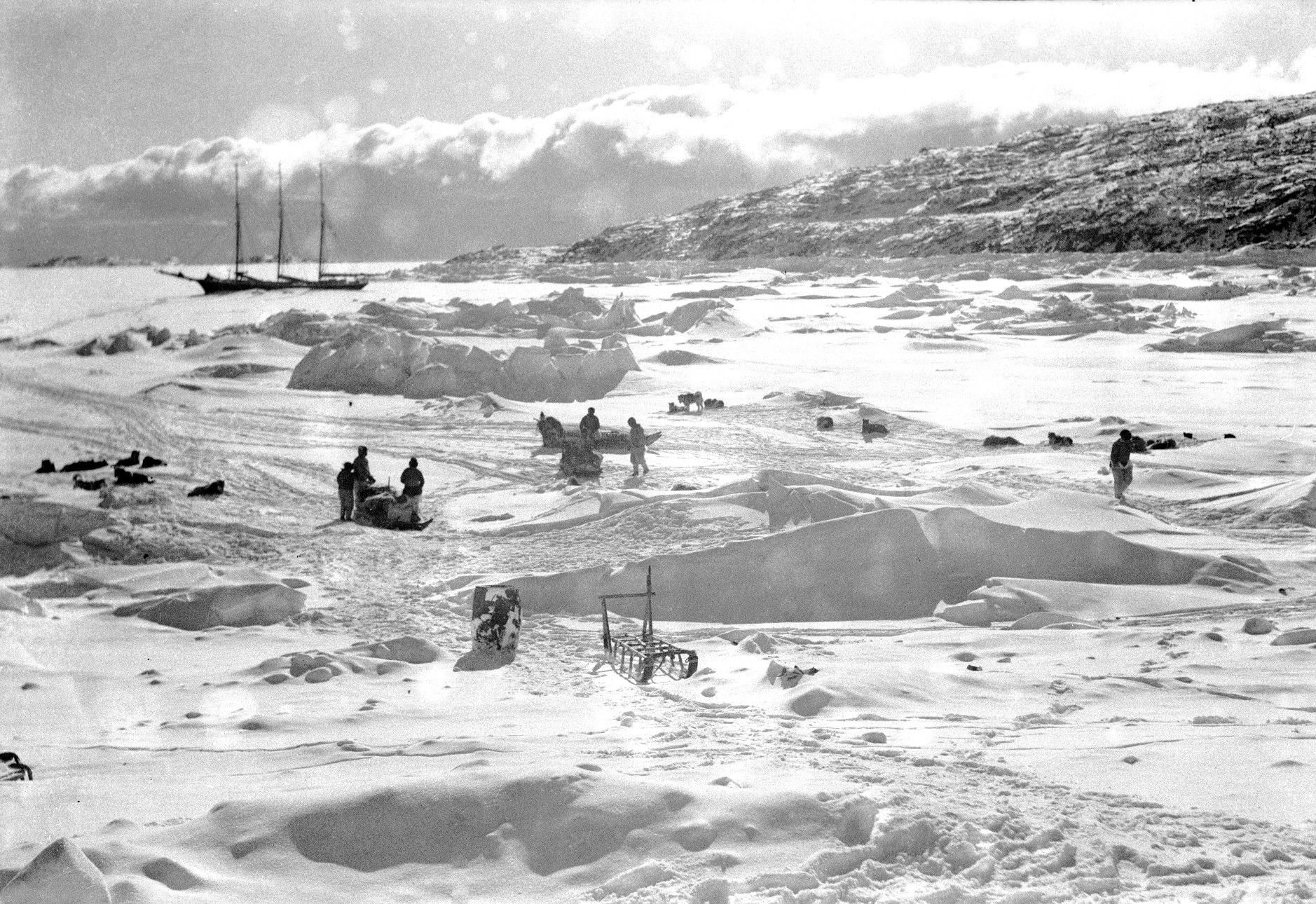
Schooner A.W. Greely frozen in Foulke Fiordat near Etah, Greenland, 1938.

They arrived at Foulke Fiord, near Etah on August 31, 1937. Before the expedition could get settled on land, they experienced a series of near disasters which almost settled the expedition at the bottom of the sound. The charts of the area showed 40 feet (12 m) of water—the ship drew 12 feet (3.7 m)—but much to their surprise they found themselves aground. By unloading some of the supplies they were able to re-float the ship at the next tide. On September 1, 1937, a severe gale blew the ship out to sea, the anchor being unable to hold on the rocky bottom. On the return to Etah, one of the engines backfired, starting a fire aboard ship. There were some anxious moments until the fire was extinguished as there was still gasoline, ammunition and dynamite aboard. After two days they were able to get back to Reindeer Point near Etah, only to find that most of the supplies that they had unloaded earlier to re-float the ship were under water, as a 10-foot (3 m) tide ebbed and flowed there. Finally the ship was unloaded, and work started on enlarging a cabin left by the Humphrey Expedition of 1934–35.

So confident was MacGregor that his ice-reinforced, wooden-hulled schooner could reach Ft. Conger that he hadn't bothered to obtain an entry permit from Danish authorities (required for a base camp in Greenland). Shortly after New Years the expedition was visited by the territorial governor, who had traveled overland from Thule. He had learned of the expedition's presence in Greenland by monitoring their radio broadcasts and instructed them to leave at the earliest opportunity.

== Accomplishments ==
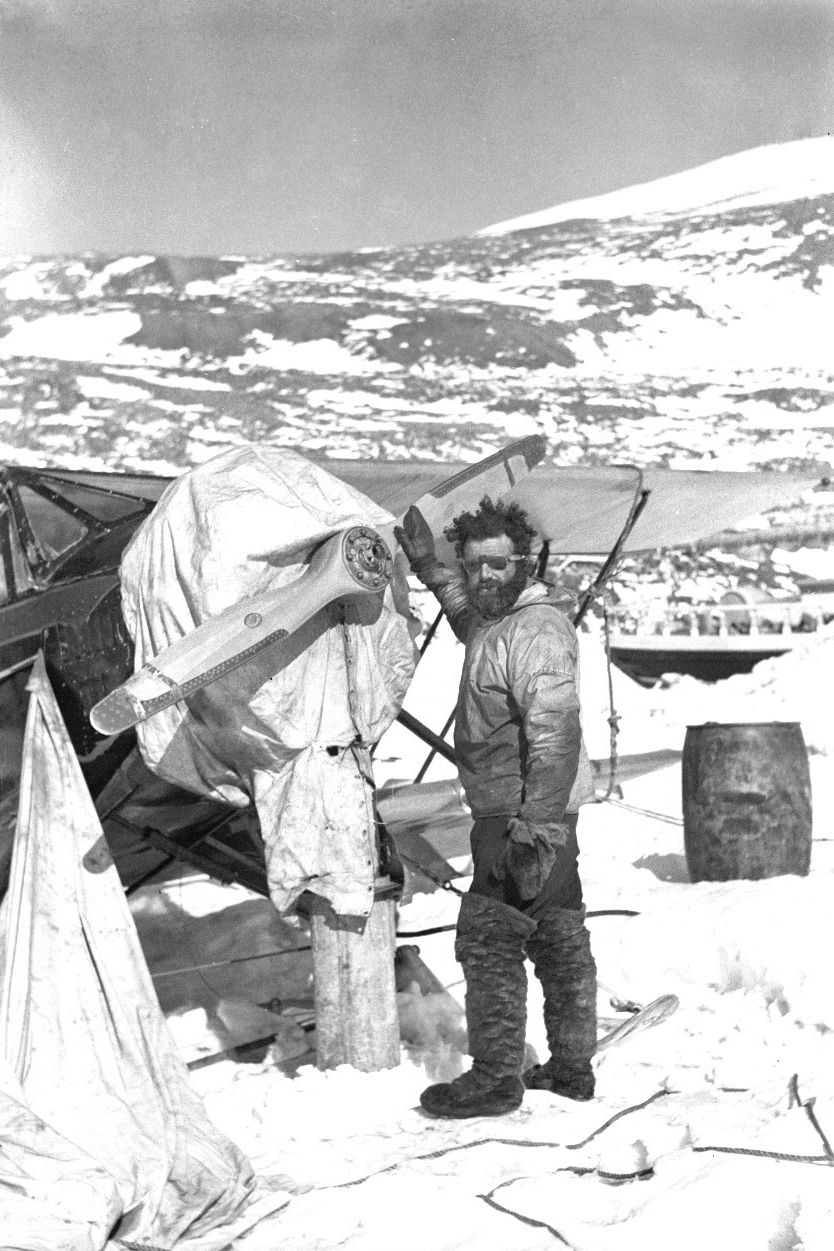
Ike Schlossbach warming up the Waco, Spring 1938

Hourly weather observations started September 8, 1937, and reports were transmitted daily to the U.S. Weather Bureau in Washington, D.C. Pilot-balloon observations were made twice daily except during December and January. All observations were continued until the hour of sailing July 7, 1938. MacGregor believed that accurately observing and plotting the development and movement of air masses as they moved across the Arctic would make possible more precise, longer-range Northern Hemispheric weather forecasting. In late 1937 MacGregor, from Etah, Greenland, gave a long-range weather forecast for 1938, based on the observations from his expedition. Two and a half months later, it proved to be amazingly accurate.

In February, Eskimos began arriving from the south. Among them was Ootah, who had accompanied Peary in 1909 on the historic first trip to the North Pole.

In March, the Haig-Thomas, Wright, Hamilton expedition visited. They shared the hut while charting portions of Ellesmere Island and conducting biological and glaciological studies. In a combined venture, Schlossbach and Wright made a 300-mile (480 km) ice cap survey northeast of Etah. It was probably the longest continuous traverse over that region to that time.

Paul Furlong and Roy Fitzsimmons trekked across Smith Sound to Cape Sabline, Ellesmere Island to deposit supplies at a Royal Canadian Mounted Police cache site (a request from Charles Camsell the Northwest Territories Commissioner).

The MacGregor expedition took with them a 1933 model Waco biplane for surveying and exploration. The aircraft had a single, 210 horsepower (hp), Continental air-cooled rotary engine. Schlossbach flew the Waco four times from Etah marking several memorable aviation accomplishments; the first solo flight over Ellesmere Island; the first landing on Ellesmere Island; and the refuting of Perry's claim that there was another island northwest of Ellesmere Island.

While exploring the coast of Ellesmere Island in 1909, Commodore Robert Peary had sighted a gray shadow on the horizon. Convinced that he had discovered an uncharted island, he christened it Crocker Land. Isaac Schlossbach armed with a sun compass and extra gas, attempted to locate Crocker Land from the air. He crisscrossed the area where Perry had placed Crocker Land. All he saw was ocean; there was no Crocker Land.

== Voyage home ==
When the ice broke in July 1938, the explorers left Greenland after making a brief stop in Thule to pick up John Johnson, who had been dog sledded there earlier for medical care.

The severe winter had damaged the schooner more than had been expected, and an ice jam in Baffin Bay held the ship for weeks, drifting with the ice. Several seams opened up, and constant pumping was required for days before reaching St. John's, Newfoundland and Labrador, where repairs were made.

During the voyage from St. Johns to Newark, off the Grand Banks, on September 21, 1938, they encountered one of the worst hurricanes that had ever moved up the Atlantic Coast. The expedition finally returned to Port Newark on October 4, 1938, having been out fifteen months and four days.

== Postscript ==
With only ten members and a scant budget, the MacGregor Arctic Expedition could not rival the major undertakings of Byrd or Scott. But it certainly was comparable in size and purpose to many other polar expeditions of its era. Besides its scientific and aviation accomplishments, the 15-month-long MacGregor Arctic Expedition was a valuable experience for several members who would serve again on polar expeditions. Ike Schlossbach would continue to be on expeditions until he was 70 years old; Paul Furlong would be with Grenfell in 1939; Roy Fitzsimmons would go on the United States Antarctic Service Expedition, 1939–41; Murray Wiener would be with Byrd on several expeditions and serve on Byrd's personal staff.

"The MacGregor Arctic Expedition had some notable achievements. Probably the most notable is its obscurity. Unlike most of its contemporaries, the MacGregor Arctic Expedition is virtually unrecorded in polar history." - Hal Vogel

== Crew ==
Clifford J. MacGregor - Commander - Meteorologist
Commander, U.S. Navy Reserve
U.S. Weather Bureau
Newark, NJ

Isaac Schlossbach - Second in Command - Navigator, Airplane Pilot
U.S. Naval Academy, Annapolis, MD
Lieutenant Commander – U.S. Navy (retired)
Nautelis Arctic Expedition
Second Byrd Antarctic Expedition
Neptune, NJ

Roy G. Fitzsimmons – Geophysicist and Magnetologist
Seaton Hall College, Class of 1937, Physics
Carnige Institution, Magnetology
Captain - U.S. Army Air Force
Newark, NJ

Robert Sterling Danskin – Aircraft Supplier - Geologist
Burdett College class of 1929
Arlington, MA

Albert Gerald Sayre – Radio Engineer
Commander U.S. Navy Reserve
Cornwall On Hudson, New York

Murray A. Wiener—Photographer
Bradley Beach, NJ

John Johnson – Cook - Mechanic
Farmingdale, NJ

Robert Inglis Jr. – Assistant Surveyor
Boy Scout
Trenton, NJ

Paul B. "Fuzzy" Furlong – Mechanic - Dog Handler
Upper Montclair, NJ

Francis D. Lawrence – Aerologist
Junior Naval Guard
East Orange, NJ

Norman Hortman - Pilot
(Left en route north at Sydney, Nova Scotia)
