= King Report on Corporate Governance =

1994, 2002, 2009 and 2016 South African reports

The King Report on Corporate Governance is a booklet of guidelines for the governance structures and operation of companies in South Africa. It is issued by the King Committee on Corporate Governance. Three reports were issued in 1994 (King I), 2002 (King II), and 2009 (King III) and a fourth revision (King IV) in 2016. The Institute of Directors in Southern Africa (IoDSA) owns the copyright of the King Report on Corporate Governance and the King Code of Corporate Governance. Compliance with the King Reports is a requirement for companies listed on the Johannesburg Stock Exchange. The King Report on Corporate Governance has been cited as "the most effective summary of the best international practices in corporate governance".

== History ==
In July 1993, the Institute of Directors in South Africa asked retired Supreme Court of South Africa judge Mervyn E. King to chair a committee on corporate governance. King viewed this as an opportunity to educate the newly democratic South African public on the working of a free economy. The committee's report was to be the first report of its kind in South Africa.

Committee members included Phillip Armstrong, Nigel Payne, and Richard Wilkinson.

== Approach ==
Unlike other corporate governance codes such as Sarbanes-Oxley, the code is non-legislative and is based on principles and practices. It also espouses an apply or explain approach, unique to the Netherlands until King and now also found in the 2010 Combined Code from the United Kingdom.

The philosophy of the code consists of the three key elements of leadership, sustainability and good corporate citizenship. It views good governance as essentially being effective, ethical leadership. King believes that leaders should direct the company to achieve sustainable economic, social and environmental performance. It views sustainability as the primary moral and economic imperative of this century; the code's view on corporate citizenship flows from a company's standing as a juristic person under the South African constitution and should operate in a sustainable manner.

== King I ==
In 1994, the first King report on corporate governance (King 1) was published, the first corporate governance code for South Africa. It established recommended standards of conduct for boards and directors of listed companies, banks, and certain state-owned enterprises. It included not only financial and regulatory aspects, but also advocated an integrated approach that involved all stakeholders.

It was applicable to all companies listed on the main board of the Johannesburg Stock Exchange, large public entities as defined by the Public Entities Act of South Africa; banks, financial and insurance companies as defined by the Financial Services Acts of South Africa; and large unlisted companies. It defined "large" as companies with shareholder equity over R50 million, but encouraged all companies to adopt the code.

The key principles from the first King report covered:

- Board of directors makeup and mandate, including the role of non-executive directors and guidance on the categories of people who should make up the non-executive directors
- Appointments to the board and guidance on the maximum term for executive directors
- Determination and disclosure of executive and non-executive director's remuneration
- Board meeting frequency
- Balanced annual reporting
- The requirement for effective auditing
- Affirmative action programs
- The company's code of ethics

== King II ==
In 2002, when the Earth Summit was held in Johannesburg, King pushed for a revision of the report (King II), including new sections on sustainability, the role of the corporate board, and risk management. This revised code of governance was applicable from March 2002.

In addition to those types of organizations listed in King I, it was applicable to departments of State or national, provincial or local government administration falling under the Local Government: Municipal Finance Management Act, and public institution or functionary exercising a power or performing a function in terms of the constitution, or exercising a public power or performing a public function in terms of any legislation, excluding courts or judicial officers. As before, it encourages all companies to adopt the applicable principles from the code.

The key principles from the second King report covered the following areas:

- Directors and their responsibility
- Risk management
- Internal audit
- Integrated sustainability reporting
- Accounting and auditing

=== Legislative Enforcement ===
As before, the code is not enforced through legislation. However, it co-exists with a number of laws that apply to companies and directors including the Companies Act. In addition further enforcement takes place by regulations such as the JSE Securities Exchange Listings Requirements.

== King III ==
Mervyn King considered the King II report wrong to include sustainability as a separate chapter, leading companies to report on it separately from other factors. In the next version, the 2009 King III report, governance, strategy and sustainability were integrated. The report recommends that organisations produce an integrated report in place of an annual financial report and a separate sustainability report and that companies create sustainability reports according to the Global Reporting Initiative's Sustainability Reporting Guidelines.

In contrast to the earlier versions, King III is applicable to all entities, public, private and non-profit. King encourages all entities to adopt the King III principles and explain how these have been applied or are not applicable. The code of governance was applicable from March 2010.

The report incorporated a number of global emerging governance trends:

- Alternative dispute resolution
- Risk-based internal audit
- Shareholder approval of non-executive directors' remuneration
- Evaluation of board and directors' performance

It also incorporated a number of new principles to address elements not previously included in the King reports:

- IT governance
- Business Rescue
- Fundamental and affected transactions in terms of director's responsibilities during mergers, acquisitions and amalgamations.

Again, the code of corporate governance is not enforced through legislation. However, due to evolutions in South African law many of the principles put forward in King II are now embodied as law in the Companies Act of South Africa of 2008. In addition to the Companies Act, there are additional applicable statutes that encapsulate some of the principles of King III such as the Public Finance Management Act and the Promotion of Access to Information Act.

- Integrated reporting
- The Unites Nations Global Compact and the Principles for Responsible Investment
- OECD Guidelines for Multinational Companies
- Global Reporting Initiative’s G3 guidelines
- The United Kingdom Companies Act of 2006

== King IV ==
"There have been significant corporate governance and regulatory developments, locally and internationally, since King III was issued in 2009 which need to be taken into account. The other consideration is that whilst listed companies are generally applying King III, non-profit organisations, private companies and entities in the public sector have experienced challenges in interpreting and adapting King III to their particular circumstances. The enhancement will aim to make King IV more accessible to all types of entities across sectors."

King IV was published on 1 November 2016. Providing for a 2-year period in respect of the drafting process and another year grace period to allow organisations to implement, and it was expected that King IV would probably become effective from middle 2017.

The Institute of Directors in Southern Africa (IoDSA) is the custodian of the King reports and the holder of their copyrights. Ansie Ramalho from the IoDSA, with the assistance of Parmi Natesan and Julie Dixon, leads the project management of the redrafting process and serves as the editor of the various drafts. The King Committee governs the drafting process and ultimately approved the King IV Report.
