= Isaac Schlossbach =

American explorer

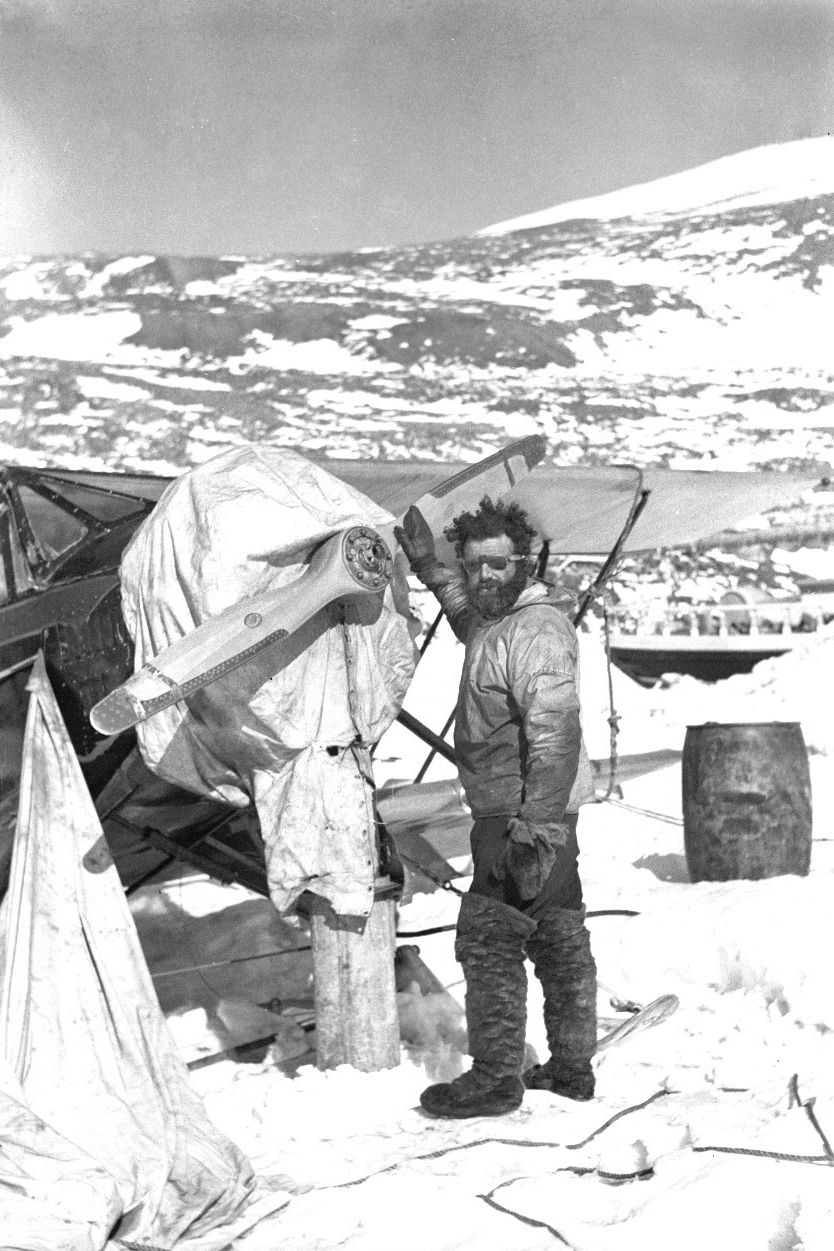
- Schlossbach warming up the Waco, Spring 1938
- Born: August 20, 1891; Bradley Beach, New Jersey, U.S.
- Died: August 1, 1984 (aged 92)
- Known for: Polar explorer

Isaac Schlossbach (c. August 20, 1891 – August 1984) was an American polar explorer, submariner and aviation pioneer.

He was born in Bradley Beach, New Jersey and raised in Neptune Township, New Jersey where he attended Neptune High School.

== Military career ==
In 1911, Schlossbach entered the United States Naval Academy in Annapolis, Maryland. As a midshipman he won letters in football and wrestling. He graduated from the Naval Academy in 1915 and volunteered to go to the first submarine school. During World War I, he commanded submarines in the Mediterranean.

In 1921, after the end of the war, Schlossbach joined the aviation branch of the United States Navy. He was first to be sent to lighter-than-air flying school (dirigibles). In 1922, he learned to fly fixed-wing aircraft. By 1925, then Lieutenant Commander Schlossbach was leading an aero squadron. He first commanded the squadron that flew the record South American flight, and then the first squadron to serve on the first aircraft carrier, USS Langley.

Schlossbach had trouble with his left eye, and the Navy assigned him to the Naval Academy, teaching engineering and aviation and coaching the football team. In 1930 at the age of 38, Lieutenant Commander Schlossbach was forced to retire from the Navy on a medical discharge when he lost his eye.

Just before U.S. entry into World War II, Schlossbach headed a small radio/meteorological team that founded the airport at Fort Chimo (Crystal I) in Labrador on 10 October 1941. Out of retirement, he further distinguished himself while assigned to Guadalcanal.

== Arctic and Antarctic exploration ==
Schlossbach went on twelve polar expeditions, three to the Arctic and nine to the Antarctic. He was on the Wilkins Trans-Arctic Expedition in 1931 and served as navigator on USS Nautilus, the first attempt to take a submarine to the North Pole under the icepack. He commanded Admiral Richard Byrd's ship, Bear of Oakland, and was a pilot on Byrd's Second Antarctic Expedition (1933–35). He was the second in command on the MacGregor Arctic Expedition (1937–38) where he accomplished a number of polar aviation firsts. In 1939, he accompanied Byrd again to the Antarctic on the United States Antarctic Service Expedition.

After World War II, Schlossbach was second in command on the last privately funded Antarctic expedition, the 1946–1948 Ronne Antarctic Research Expedition. He commanded the 1200-ton diesel-powered wooden tug Port of Beaumont, which was frozen into Back Bay through the winter. He also accompanied Finn Ronne to a cape in the Weddell Sea, which was named after him. as is a mountain.

Schlossbach accompanied an Australian research expedition to Ellsworth Station Antarctica in 1955, for which he received a letter of commendation from the Australian government.

In 1956, Admiral Byrd selected Ike as his personal representative on Operation Deep Freeze. Schlossbach accompanied Byrd on several other occasions and made his last trip to the Antarctic as a consultant to the United States Navy in 1961 when he was 70 years old.

He was awarded three Congressional medals for his contributions to Antarctic exploration.

== Other accomplishments ==
Before World War II, Schlossbach founded the Asbury Park Air Terminal, originally known as Schlossbach Field (also known as Gibson Air Academy).

His adventures took him around the world, to the South Pacific, New Zealand, Australia, the Philippines, South America as well as to the Arctic and Antarctica. He never married and died in 1984 at the age of 93.

== Timeline ==
Years	Age	Activity – Location
1891–1911	0–19	Growing up – Neptune City
1911–1915	20–24	Midshipman – United States Naval Academy, Annapolis, Maryland
1915–1921	23–29	US Navy Submarine Service – World War I – Mediterranean Sea
1921-192x	30-x	Naval Aviator – Aircraft carrier USS Langley
192x-1930	x-38	Faculty – United States Naval Academy
1930–1931	39–40	Wilkins Trans-Arctic Expedition – Nautilus – Arctic
1932	40–41	
1933–1935	41–44	Byrd's Second Antarctic Expedition – Antarctica
1936	45	Schlossbach Field
1936–1938	46–47	MacGregor Arctic Expedition Etah, Greenland
1939–1940	48–50	United States Antarctic Service Expedition (Byrd's Third Expedition) – Antarctica
1941		Ungava Bay Expedition – Canada
1942-194x	51-x	United States Navy – World War II – Guadalcanal
1946–1948	55–57	Ronne Antarctic Research Expedition – Antarctica
1949–1954	58–63	Asbury Park Air Terminal
1955	64	Australian National Research Expedition – Antarctica
1956–1957	65–66	Operation Deep Freeze I – Antarctica
1957–1958		International Weddell Sea Expedition – Antarctica
1957–1958	66–67	International Geophysical Year (Operation Deep Freeze II) – Antarctica
1958–1959	68–69	Operation Deep Freeze – Antarctica
1960–1961	70	Consultant to US Navy in Antarctica (Operation Deep Freeze V) – Antarctica
1962–1984	71–93	Retirement
