= 1937 Orizaba earthquake =

Earthquake in Mexico

- Location within Mexico
- UTC time: 1937-07-26 03:47:15
- ISC event: 903178
- USGS-ANSS: ComCat
- Local date: July 25, 1937
- Local time: 21:47
- Magnitude: 7.3 M_{s}
- Depth: 35 km (22 mi)
- Epicenter: 18.52°N 95.88°W
- Areas affected: Mexico
- Casualties: 34

The 1937 Orizaba earthquake occurred on July 26 at 03:47 UTC, near Orizaba, Veracruz, Mexico. It had a magnitude of 7.3 on the surface-wave magnitude scale. Thirty four people were reported dead. Damage was reported in Esperanza, Puebla. This was an intraplate earthquake within the subducting Cocos plate.

== See also ==
- List of earthquakes in 1937
- List of earthquakes in Mexico
