= 1668 Shandong earthquake =

Magnitude 8.5 earthquake in East China

Great Tancheng earthquake
- Location within China
- Local date: July 25, 1668
- Magnitude: 8.5 M_{s}, 7.7 or 8.5 M_{w}
- Depth: 22–28 km (14–17 mi)
- Epicenter: 35.3°N 118.6°E
- Fault: Yishu Fault
- Areas affected: Qing dynasty (present day China)
- Max. intensity: MMI XII (Extreme)
- Tsunami: Probable
- Aftershocks: Lasted for six years
- Casualties: 42,578–50,000+ dead

A major earthquake occurred during the rule of the Qing dynasty in Shandong Province on July 25, 1668. It had an estimated magnitude of M_{s} 8.5, making it the largest historical earthquake in East China, and one of the largest to occur on land. An estimated 43,000 to 50,000 people were killed, and its effects were widely felt. Its epicenter may have been located between Ju and Tancheng counties, northeast of the prefecture-level city of Linyi in southern Shandong.

== Geology ==
The earthquake occurred halfway between Beijing and Shanghai, where seismic activity is infrequent. There had not been any major earthquakes in the area for over 150 years. Within historical times, only seven earthquakes have occurred with estimated magnitudes greater than M_{s} 6.0. The first recorded earthquake occurred northwest of Zhucheng in 70 BCE, estimated at M_{s} 7.0 or greater. The most recent destructive earthquake occurred on 19 November 1829, measuring M_{s} 6.75 near Yidu and Linqu. These major earthquakes occurred along the Tan-Lu Fault Zone.

The Tan-Lu Fault Zone is eastern China's most geologically significant fault—a north-northeast-south-southwest trending dextral strike-slip fault zone. The fault extends 2,400 km (1,500 mi) from Wuxue near the Yangtze River bank, through the Bohai Sea, to Zhaoxing in Heilongjiang. It has evolved multiple times during its history; from the late Triassic to middle Cretaceous, it was a sinistral strike-slip fault zone which produced offsets ranging from 200–740 km (120–460 mi). During the late Cretaceous, the fault zone became an area of extensional tectonics, producing rift grabens and collecting sediments up to 10 km (6.2 mi) thick in some areas. During the Paleogene, rifting ceased and the fault zone evolved into a dextral strike-slip fault by the late Eocene. This was in response to the change in tectonics brought on by the India–Asia collision and subduction along the west Pacific.

== Earthquake ==
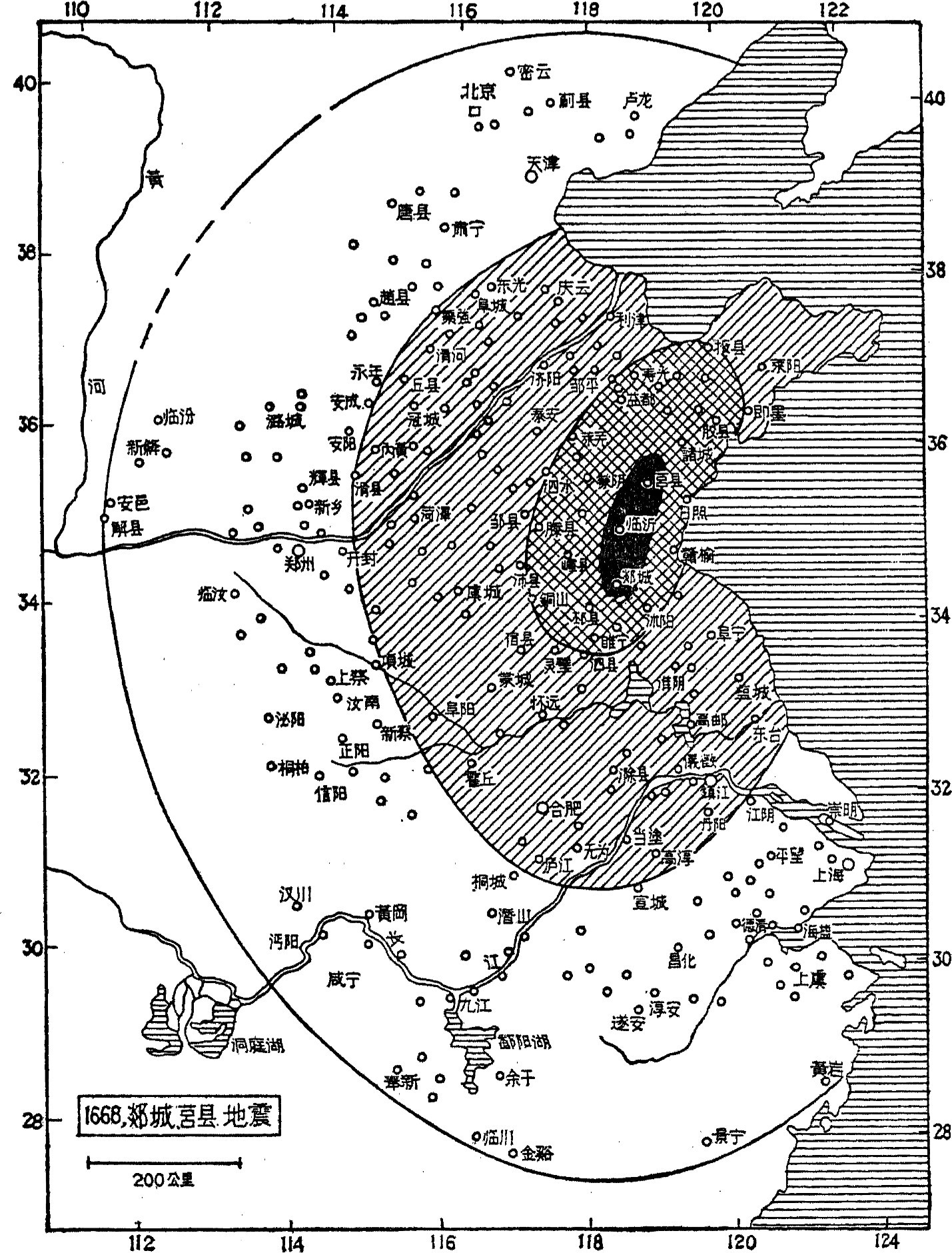
Isoseismal map of the earthquake illustrating a range of damage severity across the region

The earthquake rupture occurred along the 360 km (220 mi)-long Yishu Fault, a segment of the Tan-Lu Fault Zone. The Tan-Lu Fault Zone formed during the Mesozoic. Its slip rate has been estimated at less than 1–2.6 mm (0.039–0.102 in) per year. During the earthquake, the Yishu Fault produced an average offset of 9 m (30 ft). The slip sense was mainly dextral strike-slip with a small thrust component. Seismic inversion suggest a 160 km × 32 km (99 mi × 20 mi) rupture area on a near-vertical, north–south striking fault. A hypocenter depth of between 22 km (14 mi) and 28 km (17 mi) has been suggested. Three aftershocks occurred on 26 July and 18 September 1688; estimated at M_{s} 6.25 and 6.0, respectively. Another aftershock occurred in 1672 estimated at M_{s} 6.0.

A 2026 research paper published by Acta Seismologica Sinica detailed the discovery of surface ruptures possibly related to the 1668 event near the village of Maipo. Offset gullies, fault scarps, sag ponds and pressure ridge features were fault in the area. Right-lateral displacements of 2.0 to 3.3 m (6 ft 7 in to 10 ft 10 in) and vertical displacements of 0.25 to 1.3 m (9.8 in to 4 ft 3.2 in) were measured. At a displaced gully in southern Maipo, a maximum strike-slip offset of 5.5 ± 1 m (18.0 ± 3.3 ft) and 0.5 m (1 ft 8 in) vertical displacement was measured. Based on studying the seismicity of the area, seismologists Maipo–Hezhuang region. Scaling relationships between the rupture dimensions and earthquake magnitude suggest a moment magnitude of 7.7.

A paleoseismic study of the fault zone in 1987 suggest the same segment was the source of a similarly sized earthquake in 6280 BCE. The same fault may have also produced a 1975 earthquake in Haicheng, 700 km (430 mi) north of this event. Another destructive earthquake in 1969 was also produced along the Tan-Lu Fault Zone.

== Impact ==
Death toll by location
Place	Fatalities
Ju County	>20,000
Tancheng County	>8,700
Linyi	>6,900
Zhucheng	>2,700
Dongying	>1,000
Laiwu	Most of the population was killed
Jiaoxian	>90
Weifang	>470
Yishui	1,725
Jimo	653
Zouxian	>100
Yutai	140
Sishui	>100

The earthquake was felt in 379 counties, 29 of which experienced catastrophic damage. It also affected Jiangsu, Anhui, Zhejiang, Fujian, Jiangxi, Hubei, Henan, Hebei, Shanxi, Shaanxi, Liaoning, and Korea. Damage extended 1,000 kilometres (620 mi) away from Tancheng, Linyi and Ju counties. It is considered one of the most destructive in Chinese history. The earthquake produced strong shaking assigned XII (Extreme) on the Modified Mercalli intensity scale. Seismic intensity VIII was assigned to a 16,800 square kilometres (6,500 sq mi) elliptical-shaped area along the fault zone.

In Ju County, more than 20,000 people died. Residential and official homes were destroyed while schools, temples, warehouses and the city walls toppled. Landslides occurred on the hills around Mashi, Wulugu, Yanjiagu, Shifengdo, Keluodo and Maqi. Widespread land subsidence and collapse occurred. Fissures up to 1 metre (3 ft 3 in) wide and hundreds of meters long were observed. One fissure measured 7.5 kilometres (4.7 mi) from Guanzhuang to Gehu along a river cliff. It ejected dust, sand and water. At three wells, water was ejected 1 metre (3 ft 3 in) into the air.

In Tancheng, battlements, government buildings, homes, a watchtower, temples and storehouses were completely destroyed. Over 8,700 people died. Fissures were reportedly so wide that people were unable to walk over it. The bottom of these fissures were also too deep to be seen. Water erupted from the ground to a height of 10 metres (33 ft). At Lizhuang, a town in the county, massive subsidence occurred. In Linyi, all homes, city walls and temples were damaged, and more than 6,900 people were killed. Black-colored water reportedly emerged from fissures; water also erupted from wells, creating a pool 15–20 metres (49–66 ft) wide. In nearby cities, walls fell, and some parts were flooded by overflowing rivers and wells. Fissures caused water and sand to erupt, burying homes. Many livestock also died. Heavy damage also occurred in Ganyu.

== Tsunami ==
Historical records also documented a probable tsunami in the region. It was reported that coastal cities were flooded and rivers overflowed.

== Response ==
The Kangxi Emperor ordered his ministry to handle the relief efforts. In 40 prefectures and counties, tax fees were waived. Over 227,300 taels of silver were issued.

== See also ==
- List of historical earthquakes
- List of earthquakes in China
