= Clifford J. MacGregor =

Meteorologist, Arctic explorer and naval aviator

Clifford J. MacGregor (23 February 1904 – October 1985) was a meteorologist, Arctic explorer and naval aviator.

== Education ==
MacGregor went to College in Michigan.

== Career ==
MacGregor was in the U.S. Navy until 1926 where he was trained to pilot Zeppelins at the Philadelphia Navy Yard. MacGregor was a Commander in the US Naval Reserve and returned to active duty during World War II as a PBY Squadron Commander in Greenland. He had left the Navy only 15 years earlier. After his military service he worked for the weather bureau.

In 1930 MacGregor was posted to Alaska for the establishment of the first Arctic weather observation network for Alaskan Airways Weather Service.

He was then appointed to the Point Barrow, Alaska Meteorological Station as Commander of the U.S. Arctic weather expedition for the Second International Polar Year (1932–33). While in Alaska MacGregor formulated a theory that Northern Hemispheric weather was bred in the Arctic.

MacGregor captained a boat in the 1935 California-Hawaii yacht race.

MacGregor was assigned to the Newark Airport Weather office before taking a leave of absence to lead his own Arctic Expedition from July 1, 1937, through October 4, 1938 to Etah, Greenland. It was MacGregor and his expedition that first proposed the need for a network of Arctic weather stations.

In 1939, MacGregor was stationed at the Weather Bureau, in Horseheads, NY.

MacGregor retired in Milanville, Pennsylvania.

== Sources ==
- Inglis, Robert: "A Scout Goes North", 1938
- MacGregor, Clifford J.: "Monthly Weather Review", October 1939
- Vogel, Hal: "Ice Cap News", Nov-Dec 1977
- Vogel, Hal: "They Brought Their Own Storms", 1977
