= Corporate social responsibility =

Form of corporate self-regulation aimed at contributing to social or charitable goals

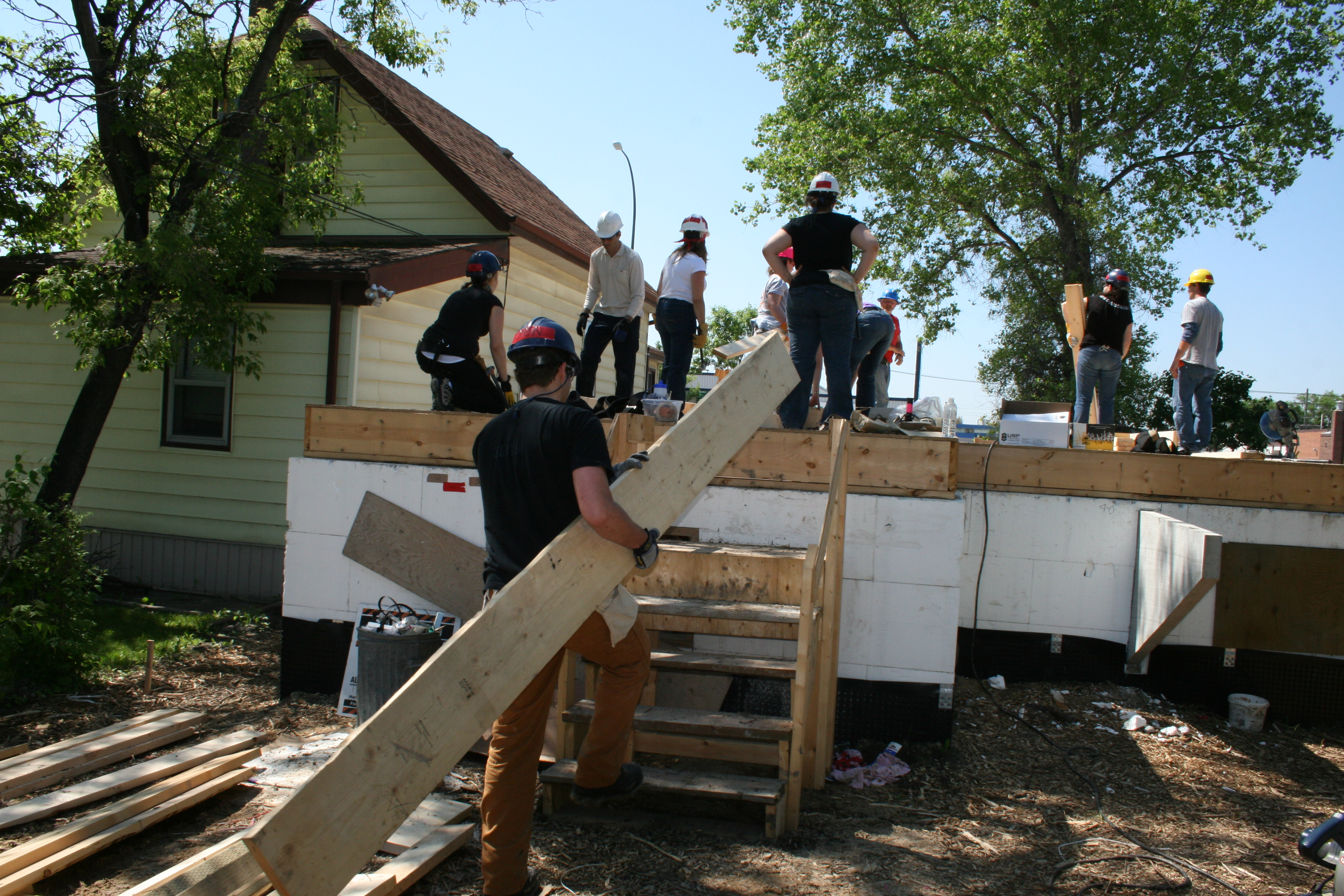
Employees of a leasing firm taking time off their regular jobs to build a house for Habitat for Humanity, a non-profit that builds homes for needy families using volunteers

Corporate social responsibility (CSR) refers to companies conducting their core operations in a responsible and sustainable way to create a positive corporate social impact. It is a form of international private business self-regulation, which aims to contribute to societal and environmental goals by reducing harm. For instance, by reducing a company's carbon footprint or increasing positive outcomes for all stakeholders. It is related to the company's commitment to be ethical in its production, employment, and investment practices. CSR is often confused with corporate sustainability; Bansal and DesJardine (2014) state that ethics permeate CSR, whereas sustainability requires businesses to make intertemporal trade-offs to uphold intergenerational equity.

While CSR often takes the form of a philanthropic, activist, or charitable nature by supporting volunteering through pro bono programs, community development, and by administering monetary grants to non-profit organizations for the public benefit, corporations have been seen shifting to a holistic and strategic approach. Strategic CSR is a long-term approach to creating a net positive social impact based on brand alignment, stakeholder integration, and ethical behaviour. Moreover, some scholars and firms are using the term "creating shared value", an extension of CSR which allows for social obligations to be met while the company reaps a profit. Others have developed a "portfolio-based view of CSR," which treats a firm's social initiatives as an interrelated portfolio of investments rather than as isolated activities.

For publicly listed companies, CSR often takes the form of environmental, social, and governance (ESG) practices and reports, but many companies have pledged to go beyond that. In some countries, companies are mandated or incentivized by governments to measure and report their impact on society, the community, and/or the environment. In addition, national and international standards, laws, and business models have been developed to facilitate and incentivize this phenomenon. Various organizations have used their authority to push it beyond individual or industry-wide initiatives. Further, CSR has been considered a form of corporate self-regulation, shifting from voluntary decisions at the level of individual organizations to mandatory schemes at regional, national, and international levels.

When focusing on corporate environmental responsibility, most firms use the term "sustainability" to explore the effort the company makes to reduce environmental harm such as by reducing waste and emissions, or by making a contribution through climate action and climate activism. Other companies focus more on their social impact, activism, or corporate citizenship. It is, therefore, important to know that CSR reports can take any of these names.

Businesses engage in CSR for strategic, ethical, or instrumental reasons. From a strategic perspective, CSR can contribute to firm performance, particularly when CSR is embedded strategically in the company, aligned with its brand, and occurs when the company utilizes its market position to create impact. Doing so, could lead to higher levels of financial and employee performance. These benefits accrue by increasing positive public relations and high ethical standards to reduce business and legal risk by taking responsibility for corporate actions. CSR strategies encourage the company to make a positive impact on the environment and stakeholders including consumers, employees, investors, communities, and others. From an ethical perspective, some businesses will adopt CSR policies and practices because of the ethical beliefs of senior management: for example, the CEO of outdoor-apparel company Patagonia, Inc. argues that harming the environment is ethically objectionable.

Proponents argue that corporations increase long-term profits by operating with a CSR perspective, while critics argue that CSR distracts from businesses' economic role. A 2000 study compared existing econometric studies of the relationship between social and financial performance, concluding that the contradictory results of previous studies reporting positive, negative, and neutral financial impact were due to flawed empirical analysis and claimed when the study is properly specified, CSR has a neutral impact on financial outcomes. Critics have questioned the "lofty" and sometimes "unrealistic expectations" of CSR, or observed that CSR is merely window-dressing, or an attempt to pre-empt the role of governments as a watchdog over powerful multinational corporations. In line with this critical perspective, political and sociological institutionalists became interested in CSR in the context of theories of globalization, neoliberalism, and late capitalism.

== Definitions ==
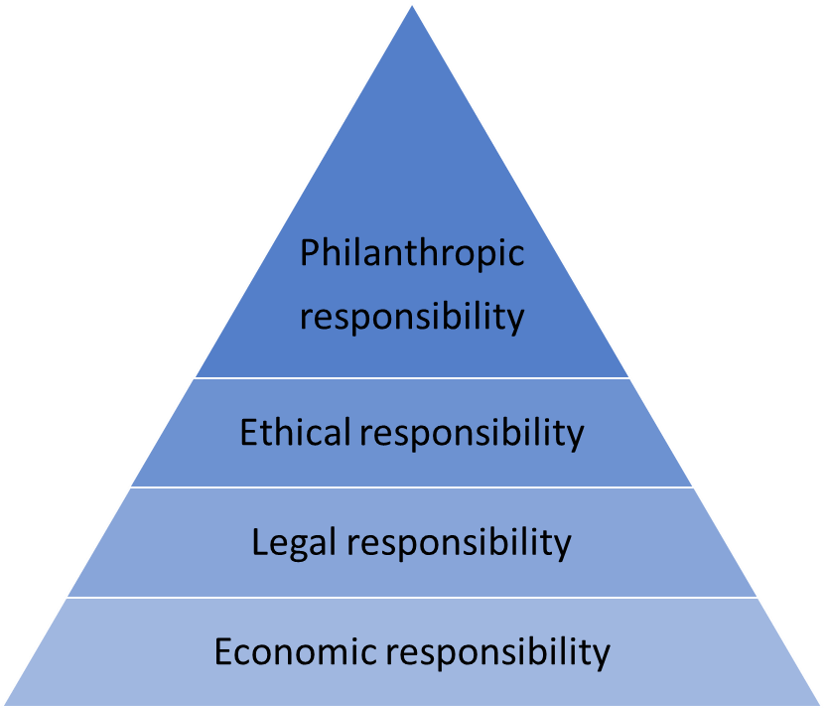
The pyramid of corporate social responsibility theorized by Archie Carrol in 1991

Since the 1960s, corporate social responsibility has attracted attention from a range of businesses, academics and stakeholders and been referred to by a number of other terms, including "corporate sustainability", "sustainable business", "corporate conscience", "corporate citizenship", "purpose", "social impact", "conscious capitalism", and "responsible business".

A wide variety of definitions have been developed, but with little consensus. Part of the definition problem has arisen because of the different interests represented. A business person may define CSR as a business strategy, an NGO activist may see it as 'greenwash' while a government official may see it as voluntary regulation. "In addition, disagreement about the definition will arise from the disciplinary approach." For example, while an economist might consider the director's discretion necessary for CSR to be implemented a risk of agency costs, a law academic may consider that discretion to be an appropriate expression of what the law demands from directors. In the 1930s, two law professors, A. A. Berle and Merrick Dodd, famously debated how directors should be made to uphold the public interest: Berle believed there had to be legally enforceable rules in favor of labor, customers and the public equal to or ahead of shareholders, while Dodd argued that powers of directors were simply held on trust.

Howard R. Bowen's 1953 book, Social Responsibilities of the Businessman, is widely regarded as the foundational work in modern CSR and "regarded as a classic in the fields of business ethics and management". Bowen was among the first to theorize that, because businesses have significant influence over society, business leaders have responsibilities that go beyond generating profit and should consider the wider social consequences of their decisions.

Another important definition of CSR is provided by Archie Carroll. He defined CSR as a four-part conceptual framework that he started to develop after his Academy of Management Review of 1979 on corporate social performance. This encompassing the economic, legal, ethical, and discretionary (philanthropic) that society has of organizations at a given point in time in response to the rising concerns on ethical issues in businesses. A review of 14,523 articles found that the stakeholder perspective is considered the most prevalent dimension of corporate social responsibility. The term stakeholder was coined in English by Eric Rhenman, a Swedish management scholar, in his 1968 book named Industrial Democracy and Industrial Management.. Robert Edward Freeman elaborated on Rhenman's initial conceptualization of stakeholder theory in his landmark book Strategic Management: A Stakeholder Approach.

Sheehy, for instance, later examined a range of different disciplinary approaches to defining CSR. The definitions reviewed included the economic definition of "sacrificing profits", a management definition of "beyond compliance", institutionalist views of CSR as a "socio-political movement," and the law's focus on directors' duties. Further, Sheehy considered Archie B. Carroll's description of CSR as a pyramid of responsibilities, namely, economic, legal, ethical, and philanthropic responsibilities.

== Consumer perspectives ==
Businesses have changed when the public came to expect and require different behavior [...] I predict that in the future, just as in the past, changes in public attitudes will be essential for changes in businesses' environmental practices.

— Jared Diamond, "Big businesses and the environment"

Most consumers agree that while achieving business targets, companies should engage in CSR efforts at the same time. Most consumers believe companies doing charity work will receive a positive response. Somerville also found that consumers are loyal and willing to spend more on retailers that support charity. Consumers also believe that retailers selling local products will gain loyalty. Smith (2013) shares the belief that marketing local products will gain consumer trust. However, environmental efforts are receiving negative views, given the belief that this would affect customer service. Oppewal et al. (2006) found that not all CSR activities are attractive to consumers. They recommended that retailers focus on one activity. Becker-Olsen (2006) found that if the social initiative done by the company is not aligned with other company goals it will have a negative impact. Mohr et al. (2001) and Groza et al. (2011) also emphasise the importance of reaching the consumer.

== Approaches ==
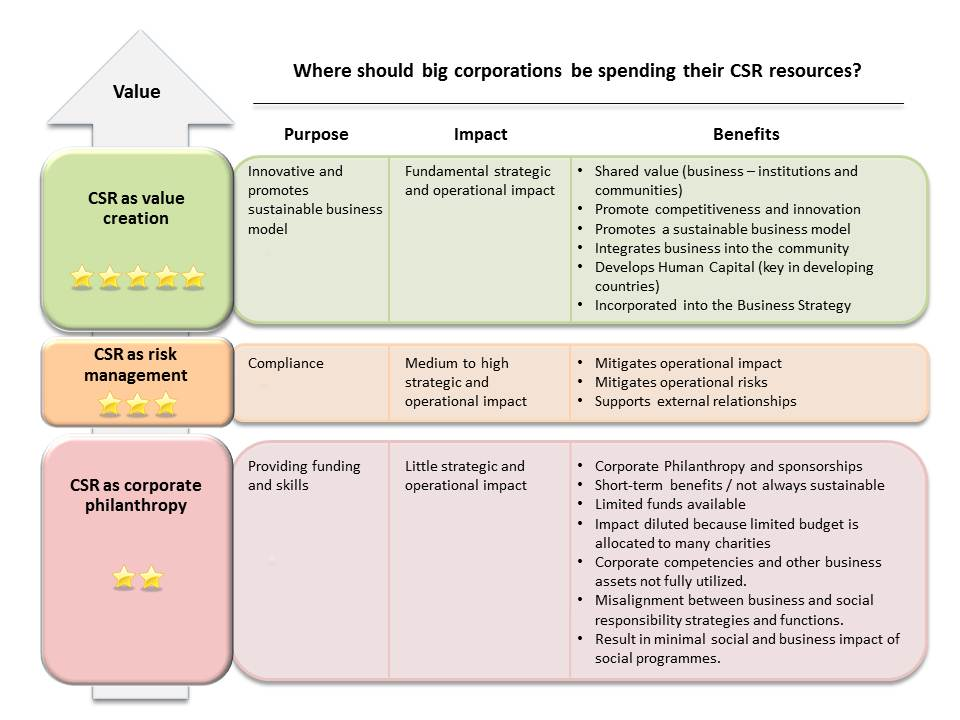
CSR approaches

The technology company Hewlett-Packard, based in California's Silicon Valley, codified their vision of corporate social responsibility as The HP Way in 1957, detailing their duty "To honor our obligations to society by being an economic, intellectual and social asset to each nation and each community in which we operate." The company organized or supported many community activities, with employees voluntarily spending unpaid personal time helping to improve society.

Some commentators have identified a difference between the Canadian (Montreal school of CSR), the Continental European, and the Anglo-Saxon approaches to CSR. It has been described that for Chinese consumers a socially responsible company makes safe, high-quality products; for Germans it provides secure employment; in South Africa it makes a positive contribution to social needs such as health care and education. Even within Europe, the discussion about CSR is very heterogeneous.

A more common approach to CSR is corporate philanthropy. This includes monetary donations and aid given to nonprofit organizations and communities. Donations are made in areas such as the arts, education, housing, health, social welfare, and the environment, among others, but excluding political contributions and commercial event sponsorship.

Another approach to CSR is to incorporate the CSR strategy directly into operations, such as procurement of Fair Trade tea and coffee.

Creating shared value, or CSV, is based on the idea that corporate success and social welfare are interdependent. The Harvard Business Review article "Strategy & Society: The Link between Competitive Advantage and Corporate Social Responsibility" provided examples of companies that have developed deep linkages between their business strategies and CSR. CSV acknowledges trade-offs between short-term profitability and social or environmental goals, but emphasizes the opportunities for competitive advantage from building a social value proposition into corporate strategy. CSV gives the impression that only two stakeholders are essential – shareholders and consumers.

Many companies employ benchmarking to assess their CSR policy, implementation, and effectiveness. Benchmarking involves reviewing competitor initiatives, measuring and evaluating the impact those policies have on society and the environment, and how others perceive competitor CSR strategy.

Meehan, Meehan and Richard developed a model known as the 3C-SR model, published in a frequently cited article in 2006, which aimed to offer "a new strategic approach to corporate responsibility". Their model sought to fill the gap between corporate social responsibility definitions and strategy, which the authors perceived to be an issue, and to provide guidance to managers on connecting businesses with ethically aware consumers.

An approach described by Tóth Gergely and published by the Hungarian Association for Environmentally Aware Management (KÖVET) refers to "Deep CSR" and the role of a "Truly Responsible Enterprise". Gergely's definition of "Deep CSR" is the behaviour displayed by a "Truly Responsible Enterprise" (TRE), which:

- sees itself as a part of the system, not a completely individual economic actor concerned only about maximizing its profit,
- recognises unsustainability (the destruction of the natural environment and the increase of social injustice) as the greatest challenge of our age,
- accepts that businesses and enterprises have to work on solutions according to their economic weight,
- honestly evaluates its weight and part in causing the problems (it is best to concentrate on 2–3 main problems),
- takes essential steps – systematically, progressively, and focused – towards a more sustainable world.

The five principles of the TRE are:

1. minimal transport
2. maximal fairness
3. zero economism
4. maximum middle size (deep CSR is more readily embedded in small and medium-sized enterprises)
5. product or service falling to the most sustainable 30%.

=== Cost-benefit analysis ===
In competitive markets, the cost-benefit analysis of CSR initiatives can be examined using a resource-based view (RBV). According to Barney (1990), "formulation of the RBV, sustainable competitive advantage requires that resources be valuable (V), rare (R), inimitable (I) and non-substitutable (S)". A firm introducing a CSR-based strategy might only sustain high returns on their investment if their CSR-based strategy could not be copied (I). However, should competitors imitate such a strategy that might increase overall social benefits? Firms that choose CSR for strategic financial gain are also acting responsibly.

RBV presumes that firms are bundles of heterogeneous resources and capabilities that are imperfectly mobile across firms. This imperfect mobility can produce competitive advantages for firms that acquire immobile resources. McWilliams and Siegel (2001) examined CSR activities and attributes as a differentiation strategy. They concluded that managers could determine the appropriate level of investment in CSR by conducting a cost-benefit analysis in the same way they analyze other investments. Reinhardt (1998) found that a firm engaging in a CSR-based strategy could only sustain an abnormal return if it could prevent competitors from imitating it.

- Moreover, regarding cost-benefit analysis, one should look at Waddock and Graves (1997), who showed that corporate social performance was positively linked to financial performance, meaning that the benefits of being socially responsible outweigh the costs. McWilliams and Siegel (2000) noted that Waddock and Graves had not considered innovation, that companies that incorporated CSR were also very innovative, and that the innovation drove financial performance, not CSR. Hull and Rothenberg (2007) then found that when companies are not innovative, a history of CSR does help financial performance.

==== CSR and corporate financial performance ====
The relationship between corporate social responsibility and a firm's corporate financial performance is a phenomenon that is being explored in a variety of research studies that are being conducted across the world. Based on these research studies, including those undertaken by Sang Jun Cho, Chune Young Chung, and Jason Young, a positive relationship exists between a firm's corporate social responsibility policies and corporate financial performance. To investigate this relationship, the researchers conducted a regression analysis and preceded the analysis with the provision of several measures that they utilized to serve as proxies for key financial performance indicators (i.e. return on assets serves as a proxy for profitability).

== Scope ==
Initially, CSR emphasized the official behaviour of individual firms. Later, it expanded to include supplier behaviour, the uses to which products were put, and how articles were disposed of after they lost value. Malcolm McIntosh notes also that focussing on the identifiable behaviour of individual businesses risks not including what he calls "unincorporated market behaviour" within the scope of CSR - actions attributable to market processes, and also calls for other factors including "brand citizenship" and "illegitimate, informal or illegal activity" to be considered as part of a more complete picture.

The term "brand citizenship" has been put forward because the public perception of an organisation may be associated with its branding rather than its corporate identity: McIntosh uses Virgin as an example. Similarly, Anne Bahr Thompson uses the same term and observes that companies adopting socially responsible behaviours are primarily investing in their reputations.

=== Supply chain ===
In the 21st century, corporate social responsibility in the supply chain has attracted attention from businesses and stakeholders. A corporation's supply chain is the process by which several organizations, including suppliers, customers, and logistics providers, work together to provide a value package of products and services to the end-user, who is the customer.

Corporate social irresponsibility in the supply chain has greatly affected the reputation of companies, leading to many costs to solve the problems. For instance, incidents like the 2013 Savar building collapse, which killed over 1000 people, pushed companies to consider the impacts of their operations on society and the environment. The horsemeat scandal of 2013 in Europe affected many food retailers, including Tesco, the largest retailer in the United Kingdom, leading to the dismissal of the supplier. Corporate social irresponsibility from suppliers and retailers has greatly affected the stakeholders who lost trust in the affected business entities. Although sometimes it is not directly undertaken by the companies, they become accountable to the stakeholders. These surrounding issues have prompted supply chain management to consider the corporate social responsibility context. Wieland and Handfield (2013) suggested that companies must include social responsibility in their reviews of component quality. They highlighted the use of technology to improve visibility across the supply chain.

=== Corporate social initiatives ===
Corporate social responsibility includes six types of corporate social initiatives:

- Corporate philanthropy: company donations to charity, including cash, goods, and services, sometimes via a corporate foundation
- Community volunteering: company-organized volunteer activities, sometimes while an employee receives pay for pro-bono work on behalf of a non-profit organization
- Socially-responsible business practices: ethically produced products that appeal to a customer segment
- Cause promotions and activism: company-funded advocacy campaigns
- Cause-related marketing: donations to charity based on product sales
- Corporate social marketing: company-funded behavior-change campaigns

All six of the corporate initiatives are forms of corporate citizenship. However, only some of these CSR activities rise to the level of cause marketing, defined as "a type of corporate social responsibility (CSR) in which a company's promotional campaign has the dual purpose of increasing profitability while bettering society."

Companies generally do not have a profit motive when participating in corporate philanthropy and community volunteering. The remaining corporate social initiatives can be examples of cause marketing, in which there is both a societal interest and a profit motive.

=== Corporate digital responsibility ===
Corporate Digital Responsibility (CDR) is an extension of CSR that addresses data protection, AI ethics, digital inclusion, and the environmental impact of digital operations. CDR applies to organizations with digital business models and is typically managed by existing CSR departments, though integration into traditional CSR frameworks remains incomplete. Countries like Germany and France have developed government-led CDR initiatives, with Germany establishing voluntary commitment charters and France creating a framework through its CSR Platform.

== Implementation ==
CSR may be based within the human resources, business development or public relations departments of an organisation, or may be a separate unit reporting to the CEO or the board of directors.

=== Engagement plan ===
An engagement plan can assist in reaching the desired audience. A corporate social responsibility individual or team plans the goals and objectives of the organization. As with any corporate activity, a defined budget demonstrates commitment and scales the program's relative importance.

=== Accounting, auditing, and reporting ===
Social accounting is the communication of social and environmental effects of a company's economic actions to particular interest groups within society and to society at large.

Social accounting emphasizes the notion of corporate accountability. Crowther defines social accounting as "an approach to reporting a firm's activities which stresses the need for the identification of socially relevant behavior, the determination of those to whom the company is accountable for its social performance and the development of appropriate measures and reporting techniques."

Modern CSR has a wide range of different standards, frameworks and metrics for reporting and disclosing the social, environmental and economic issues. However, there is no single, fixed standard and the complex, dynamic and contextual nature of CSR means different companies and stakeholders adopt different approaches depending on their needs.

There are a range of reporting guidelines and standards that serve as frameworks for social accounting, auditing, and reporting:

- AccountAbility's AA1000 standard, based on John Elkington's triple bottom line (3BL) reporting
- The Prince's Accounting for Sustainability Project's Connected Reporting Framework
- The Fair Labor Association conducts audits based on its Workplace Code of Conduct and posts audit results on the FLA website.
- The Fair Wear Foundation verifies labour conditions in companies' supply chains using interdisciplinary auditing teams.
- Global Reporting Initiative's Sustainability Reporting Guidelines
- Economy for the Common Good's Common Good Balance Sheet
- GoodCorporation's standard developed in association with the Institute of Business Ethics
- Synergy Codethic 26000 Social Responsibility and Sustainability Commitment Management System (SRSCMS) Requirements—Ethical Business Best Practices of Organizations—the necessary management system elements to obtain a certifiable ethical commitment management system. The standard scheme has been built around ISO 26000 and UNCTAD Guidance on Good Practices in Corporate Governance. The standard applies to any organization.
- Earthcheck Certification / Standard
- Social Accountability International's SA8000 standard
- Standard Ethics Aei guidelines
- The ISO 14000 environmental management standard
- The United Nations Global Compact requires companies to communicate their progress (or to produce a Communication on Progress, COP), and to describe the company's implementation of the Compact's ten universal principles.
- The United Nations Intergovernmental Working Group of Experts on International Standards of Accounting and Reporting (ISAR) provides voluntary technical guidance on eco-efficiency indicators, corporate responsibility reporting, and corporate governance disclosure.
- The FTSE Group publishes the FTSE4Good Index, an evaluation of CSR performance of companies.
- EthicalQuote (CEQ) tracks the reputation of the world's largest companies on Environmental, Social, Governance (ESG), Corporate Social Responsibility, ethics, and sustainability.
- The Islamic Reporting Initiative (IRI) is a not-for-profit organization that leads the creation of the IRI framework; the guiding integrated CSR reporting framework based on Islamic principles and values.

Legal requirements for social accounting, auditing, and reporting exist in nations like France. However, international or national agreement on meaningful social and environmental performance measurements has not been achieved. Many companies produce externally audited annual reports that cover Sustainable Development and CSR issues ("Triple Bottom Line Reports"), but the reports vary widely in format, style, and evaluation methodology (even within the same industry). Critics dismiss these reports as lip service, citing examples such as Enron's yearly "Corporate Responsibility Annual Report" and tobacco companies' social reports.

In South Africa, as of June 2010, all companies listed on the Johannesburg Stock Exchange (JSE) were required to produce an integrated report in place of an annual financial report and sustainability report. An integrated report reviews environmental, social, and economic performance alongside financial performance. This requirement was implemented in the absence of formal or legal standards. An Integrated Reporting Committee (IRC) was established to issue guidelines for good practice.

One of the reputable institutions that capital markets turn to for credible sustainability reports is the Carbon Disclosure Project, or CDP.

=== Verification ===
Consumers of goods and services should verify corporate social responsibility and the results of reports and efforts. The accounting, auditing, and reporting resources provide a foundation for consumers to verify that their products are socially sustainable. Due to an increased awareness of the need for CSR, many industries have their verification resources. They include organizations such as the Forest Stewardship Council (paper and forest products), International Cocoa Initiative, and Kimberly Process (diamonds). The United Nations Global Compact provides frameworks not only for verification, but also for reporting human rights violations in corporate supply chains.

=== Ethics training ===
The rise of ethics training inside corporations, some of which are required by government regulation, has helped CSR to spread. Such training aims to help employees make ethical decisions when the answers are unclear. The most direct benefit is reducing the likelihood of "dirty hands", fines, and damaged reputations for breaching laws or moral norms. Organizations see increased employee loyalty and pride in the organization.

=== Common actions ===
Common CSR actions include:

- Environmental sustainability: recycling, waste management, water management, renewable energy, reusable materials, 'greener' supply chains, reducing paper use, and adopting Leadership in Energy and Environmental Design (LEED) building standards.
- Human capital enhancement: Companies provide additional resources for capacity building of local employees, including technical and professional training, adult basic education, and language classes.
- Community involvement: This can include raising money for local charities, providing volunteers, sponsoring local events, employing local workers, supporting local economic growth, engaging in fair trade practices, etc.
- Ethical marketing: Companies that ethically market to consumers are placing a higher value on their customers and respecting them as people who are ends in themselves. They do not try to manipulate or falsely advertise to potential consumers. This is important for companies that want to be viewed as ethical.
- Supply Chain Management: Ensuring responsible procurement practices, including avoiding child labor and forced labor, conducting regular social and environmental audits of suppliers, and supporting fair trade practices. This can enhance transparency and ethical standards throughout the supply chain.

=== Social license to operate ===
The term "social license" was introduced in 1997 and has since been applied in multiple resource extraction industries to describe changes in company-community interactions. This use of social license has included an understanding of how acceptance levels impact resource development operations within these industries. Gunningham et al. state corporations comply with their social license by operating within societal expectations and avoiding activities (or influential elements within them) considered unacceptable, and define social license it as "the demands on and expectations for a business enterprise that emerge from neighborhoods, environmental groups, local stakeholders, and other elements of the surrounding civil society".

Social License to Operate can be determined as contractual grounds for the legitimacy of activities and projects a company is involved in. It refers to the level of support and approval of a company's activities by its stakeholders. Displaying commitment to CSR is one way to achieve a social license, by enhancing a company's reputation.

As stated in Enduring value: the Australian minerals industry framework for sustainable development the concept of the 'social license to operate', then defined simply as obtaining and maintaining broad community support and acceptance. Unless a company earns and maintains that license, social license holders may intend to block project developments; employees may leave the company for a company that is a better corporate citizen: and companies may be under ongoing legal challenge. Issues related to the government's measurement of corporations' social license include its role in licensure processes, the penalties for non-compliance, or the community's ability to halt a project if a corporation is not responsive to their concerns, are still subject to global concern. Regardless of government involvement, social license is achieved within and given by communities, which is defined as "a social unit of any size that shares common values, or that is situated in a given geographical area". Lacey suggested that social license can take a long time for a corporation or industry to achieve, but social license can be lost very quickly for a variety of factors, including changes in stakeholder expectations, technology, or other disturbances. Gunningham et al. stated that meeting and exceeding regulations to build reputational capital is economically vital, saying: "in certain circumstances, [natural resource-based industries] cannot afford to do otherwise". In communities with a diverse economy, achieving social license is often much more complex than in local communities, which depend economically on the natural resource industry.

In research undertaken by Ketola et al., the writers believed that the forest products industry in rural Michigan in the United States may have received a social license through the channels that mining corporations initially established and the long history of logging and copper mining in the area continued to shape the attitudes and identities of industry participants to present day. They found that local stakeholders and local industry operators have shared history and experience as having limited power to control the larger economic forces acting upon them. Local actors are more likely to have values similar to those of stakeholders, have established some history in the area, and have had the time to develop meaningful relationships within the community. This shared experience shaped the process of acquiring a social license. Nonlocal actors are likely to experience a much lesser degree of social license than local actors. Furthermore, many of the resources affected by forest management are held in the public trust, so it is essential for both industry actors and community stakeholders to feel engaged and involved in decisions regarding local natural resource management. Baines and Edwards shared similar findings in New Zealand's aquaculture sector regarding the importance of relationships and communication between industry and local stakeholders. They find that social license depends on relationships and building trust. Smaller, local companies tend towards relationships that are relational as opposed to transactional, possibly due to their ongoing community presences and communication abilities, which are better for fostering these relationships and trust building.

In research of Requisite Organization, Elliott Jaques defines Social License to Operate for the company as the social contract the company has with the social license holders (employees, trade unions, communities, government) for them to manifest positive intention to support the business short- and long-term objectives by "providing managerial leadership that nurtures the social good and also gives the foundation for sustainable growth in organizational results."

The primary objective for the companies is to obtain and maintain the Social License to Operate. Based on the Requisite Organization, to achieve this goal, a company needs to:

- Identify the business strategy and business objectives
- Identify the social license holders (employees of a company, labour unions, local and national governments, communities, activist groups, etc.) for every business objectives
- Identify the support that the company desires to achieve from the social license holders by specifying for every business objective social license element (target of support, context of support, time of support, action of support)
- Quantitatively measure the intention (positive or negative) of the social license holders to support the business objectives
- Identify the factors that negatively impact the intention of the social license holders to support the business objectives (strength of their belief in support, their evaluation of support outcomes, the pressure to provide support, enablers/disablers of support, etc.)
- Develop the Social License Development Strategy to remove the negative factors and ensure the positive intention of all the social license holders to support all the company's business objectives.
- Perform ongoing monitoring and quantitative measurement of changes in the Social License to Operate of the company

=== Emerging markets vs. developed economies ===
A positive relationship has been shown to exist between CSR and a firm's corporate financial performance. However, results from these analyses may need to be examined under different lenses for emerging and developed economies, especially since firms based in emerging economies oftentimes have weak firm-level governance.

For companies operating in emerging markets, engaging in CSR practices enables widespread reach into a variety of outside markets, an improved reputation, and stakeholder relationships. In all cases (emerging markets vs. developed economies), implementing CSR policies into the daily activities and framework of a company has been shown to allow for a competitive advantage versus other companies, including the creation of a positive image for the company, improved stakeholder relationships, increased employee morale, and attraction of new consumers who are committed to social responsibility. Despite all of the benefits, several drawbacks exist, including possible accusations of hypocrisy, the difficulty of measuring the social impact of CSR policies, and oftentimes placing companies at a disadvantage against competitors when prioritizing CSR ahead of advancing a company's R&D.

== Potential business benefits ==
A large body of literature urges businesses to adopt non-financial measures of success (e.g., Deming's Fourteen Points, balanced scorecards). While CSR benefits are hard to quantify, Orlitzky, Schmidt and Rynes found a correlation between social/environmental performance and financial performance. However, across the empirical literature this correlation is on average relatively small.

The business case for CSR within a company employs one or more of these arguments:

=== Triple bottom line ===
"People, planet, and profit", also known as the triple bottom line, form one way to evaluate CSR. "People" refers to fair labour practices, the community, and the region where the business operates. "Planet" refers to sustainable environmental practices. Profit is the economic value created by the organization after deducting the cost of all inputs, including the cost of the capital (unlike accounting definitions of profit).

The triple bottom line focuses on balancing economic, ecological, and social objectives..

This measure was claimed to help some companies be more conscious of their social and moral responsibilities. However, critics claim that it is selective and substitutes a company's perspective for that of the community. Another criticism is about the absence of a standard auditing procedure.

The term was coined by John Elkington in 1994 who re-evaluated it in 2018 and called for more urgent action toward sustainability

=== Human resources ===
A CSR program can be an aid to recruitment and retention, particularly within the competitive graduate student market. Potential recruits often consider a firm's CSR policy. CSR can also help improve the perception of a company among its staff, particularly when staff can become involved through payroll giving, fundraising activities, or community volunteering. CSR has been credited with encouraging customer orientation among customer-facing employees.

CSR is known for impacting employee turnover. Several executives suggest that employees are their most valuable asset and that the ability to retain them leads to organizational success. Socially responsible activities promote fairness, which in turn generates lower employee turnover. Recent research using employee reviews of S&P 500 firms has found that stronger ESG performance is associated with higher employee satisfaction, partly through employees' perceptions of organizational justice. On the other hand, if a firm demonstrates irresponsible behavior, employees may view this behavior as negative. Proponents argue that treating employees well with competitive pay and good benefits is seen as socially responsible behavior and, therefore, reduces employee turnover. Executives have a strong desire for building a positive work context that benefits CSR and the company as a whole. This interest is driven particularly by the realization that a positive work environment can result in desirable outcomes such as more favorable job attitudes and increased work performance.

The IBM Institute for Business Value surveyed 250 business leaders worldwide in 2008. The survey showed that businesses have assimilated a much more strategic view with 68% of companies utilizing CSR as an opportunity and part of a sustainable growth strategy. Developing and implementing a CSR strategy represents a unique opportunity to benefit the company. However, only 31% of businesses surveyed engaged their employees on the company's CSR objectives and initiatives. Employee engagement on CSR initiatives can be a powerful recruitment and retention tool. Moreover, employees tend to avoid employers with a bad reputation.

=== Risk management ===
Managing risk is an important executive responsibility. Reputations that take decades to build up can be ruined in hours through corruption scandals or environmental accidents. These situations draw unwanted attention from regulators, courts, governments, and the media. CSR can limit these risks.

Sustainability is key to resilience across value chains. As companies prefer working with long-lasting partners, those that have implemented CSR practices will be preferred over ones that have not in order to minimize reputational as well as other damages. High levels of CSR compliance within supply chains (including Tier 1 and beyond) will also help reduce vulnerabilities and eliminate environmental, social, and economic risks through implementing a sustainability-focused procurement strategy.

With effective CSR policies, a company can better mitigate legislative and legal risks by complying with emerging CSR-related laws and regulations, preempting costly lawsuits and non-compliance actions, and addressing sources of non-compliance by fostering corporate alignment around the relevant issues.

=== Brand differentiation ===
CSR can enhance a brand's reputation by "inducing a desire to support and help the company that has acted to benefit consumers". In this way, CSR serves to enhance brand perceptions, which can lead to positive product evaluations, though this effect is dependent upon a variety of factors, including the degree to which consumers value close relationships or believe that the CSR initiative is self-serving, whether the CSR program may be perceived to affect product quality negatively, consumers' consumption-related goals (i.e., whether their consumption is socially versus product-motivated), or consumers' attributions toward the motives of the CSR endeavor.

Some companies use their commitment to CSR as their primary positioning tool, e.g., The Co-operative Group, The Body Shop, and American Apparel. Others use CSR methodologies as a strategic tactic to gain public support for their presence in global markets, helping them sustain a competitive advantage by using their social contributions as another form of advertising.

Companies that operate strong CSR activities tend to drive customers' attention to buy products or services regardless of the price. As a result, this increases competition among firms since customers are aware of the company's CSR practices. These initiatives serve as a potential differentiator because they not only add value to the company, but also to the products or services. Furthermore, firms under intense competition can leverage CSR to increase the impact of their distribution on the firm's performance. Lowering the carbon footprint of a firm's distribution network or engaging in fair trade are potential differentiators to lower costs and increase profits. In this scenario, customers can observe the company's commitment to CSR while increasing company sales.

Whole Foods' marketing and promotion of organic foods have had a positive effect on the supermarket industry. Proponents assert that Whole Foods has been able to work with its suppliers to improve animal treatment and the quality of meat offered in their stores. They also promote local agriculture in over 2,400 independent farms to maintain their line of sustainable organic produce. As a result, Whole Foods' high prices do not turn customers away from shopping. They are pleased to buy organic products that come from sustainable practices.

A Harvard Business Review article proposes three stages of practice in which CSR can be divided. Stage one focuses on philanthropy, including donations of money or equipment to non-profit organizations, engagement with community initiatives, and employee volunteering. This is characterized as the "soul" of a company, expressing the social and environmental priorities of the founders. The authors assert that companies engage in CSR because they are an integral part of society. The Coca-Cola Company contributes $88.1 million annually to various environmental, educational, and humanitarian organizations. Another example is PNC Financial Services' "Grow Up Great" childhood education program. This program provides critical school readiness resources to underserved communities where PNC operates.

Stage two focuses on improving operational effectiveness in the workplace. The researchers assert that programs in this stage strive to deliver social or environmental benefits to support a company's operation across the value chain by improving efficiency. Some examples include sustainability initiatives to reduce resource use, waste, and emissions that could reduce costs. It also calls for investing in employee work conditions such as health care and education, which may enhance productivity and retention. Unlike philanthropic giving, which is evaluated by its social and environmental return, initiatives in the second stage are predicted to improve the corporate bottom line with social value. Grupo Bimbo, the largest bakery in Mexico, is an excellent example of this. The company strives to meet social welfare needs. It offers free educational services to help employees complete high school. Bimbo also provides supplementary medical care and financial assistance to close government health coverage gaps.

Moreover, the third stage of the program aims to transform the business model. Companies create new forms of business to address social or environmental challenges that will lead to financial returns in the long run. One example can be seen in Unilever's Project Shakti in India. The authors describe that the company hires women in villages and provides them with micro-finance loans to sell soaps, oils, detergents, and other products door-to-door. This research indicates that more than 65,000 women entrepreneurs are doubling their incomes while increasing rural access and hygiene in Indian villages. Another example is IKEA's "People and Planet" initiative, which is to be 100% sustainable by 2020. Consequently, the company wants to introduce a new model to collect and recycle old furniture.

=== Reduced scrutiny ===
Corporations are keen to avoid interference in their business through taxation or regulations. A CSR program can persuade governments and the public that a company takes health and safety, diversity, and the environment seriously, reducing the likelihood that company practices will be closely monitored.

=== Supplier relations ===
Appropriate CSR programs can increase the attractiveness of supplier firms to potential customer corporations. For example, a fashion merchandiser may find value in an overseas manufacturer that uses CSR to establish a positive image and to reduce the risks of bad publicity from uncovered misbehavior.

A price-focused procurement strategy has limitations for companies with high CSR expectations. According to Boston Consulting Group, "businesses that are considered leaders in environmental, social and governance criteria have an 11% valuation premium over their competitors." Such companies look for suppliers who share their social, environmental, and business ethics values, which in turn would trigger common innovations that would attract more customers and generate further value for the whole supply chain for a win-win business relationship through a series of interconnected activities implemented holistically. Furthermore, supplier relations are crucial for a company's CSR profile as 70% of businesses' social and environmental impacts occur in their supply chain. Through the spillover effect, CSR programs encourage sustainable practices within different industries. Additionally, a CSR-focused supplier relations management improves collaboration with suppliers, increases the satisfaction of customers' expectations and requirements, expands market opportunities, enhances investor relations, and promotes the development of more sustainable products. Furthermore, CSR supply chain imperatives can leverage their responsible commitment to forge robust and lasting relationships with important stakeholders and positively influence the decision-making of consumers, partners, investors, and talent. By constructing this reputational capital, companies can earn consumer loyalty, attract top talent, and strengthen employee morale and commitment.

=== Crisis management ===
CSR strategies or behaviors related to CSR were discussed by many scholars in terms of crisis management, such as responses to boycotts in an international context. Ang found that relationship building through providing additional services rather than price-cutting is what businesses in Asia feel more comfortable with as a strategy during an economic crisis. Regarding direct research about strategies in cross-cultural crisis management, scholars found that CSR strategies could make effects through empirical case studies involving multinational businesses in China. They found that meeting local stakeholders' social expectations can mitigate the risk of crises. The strategy utilized by Arla Foods works and has helped the company regain most of its lost market share among many countries in the Middle East. Arla Foods founded funding for children with cancer, and they donated ambulances to refugees in Lebanon. As Arla Foods did, they tried to contribute to solving social problems of children's access to health care, which were local priorities. Other researchers analyzed the case of multinational enterprise strategies during the conflict between Lebanon and Israel. During the conflict, many companies stressed seeking to help the local community. In the post-conflict stage, managers highlighted their philanthropic programs and contributions, in terms of monetary in-kind donations to the refugees or businesses that were directly affected. For example, Citibank has provided monetary assistance to some local businesses affected by the war. Another activity done by a Lebanese company was a fund-raising campaign.

== Criticisms and concerns ==
CSR concerns include its relationship to the purpose of business and the motives for engaging in it.

=== Purpose of business ===
Milton Friedman and others argued that a corporation's purpose is to maximize returns to its shareholders and that obeying the laws of the jurisdictions within which it operates constitutes socially responsible behavior. Friedman argued each person should be free to spend their own money on social causes if they wished, but that business owners should avoid putting a "tax" on consumers as "unwitting puppets" of socialism by raising prices to support business practices with social goals unrelated to profit.

While some CSR supporters claim that companies practicing CSR, especially in developing countries, are less likely to exploit workers and communities, critics claim that CSR itself imposes outside values on local communities with unpredictable outcomes.

Rather than voluntary measures, better governmental regulation and enforcement are an alternative to CSR that moves decision-making and resource allocation from public to private bodies. However, critics claim that effective CSR must be voluntary as mandatory social responsibility programs regulated by the government interferes with people's plans and preferences, distorts the allocation of resources, and increases the likelihood of irresponsible decisions.

=== Motives ===
A story of CSR promoted by Azim Premji Foundation in India

Some critics believe that companies undertake CSR programs to distract the public from ethical questions posed by their core operations. They argue that the reputational benefits that CSR companies receive (cited above as a benefit to the corporation) demonstrate the hypocrisy of the approach. Moreover, some studies find that CSR programs are motivated by corporate managers' interests at the cost of the shareholders so they are a type of an agency problem in corporations.

Others have argued that the primary purpose of CSR is to provide legitimacy to the power of businesses. As wealth inequality is perceived to be increasing it has become increasingly necessary for businesses to justify their position of power.

Joel Bakan is one of the prominent critics of the conflict of interest between private profit and a public good, characterizing corporate officials of publicly listed corporations as constrained by law to maximize the wealth of their shareholders. This argument is summarised by Haynes that "a corporate calculus exists in which costs are pushed onto both workers, consumers and the environment". CSR spending may be seen in these financial terms, whereby the higher costs of socially undesirable behaviour are offset by a CSR spending of a lower amount. Indeed, it has been argued that there is a "halo effect" in terms of CSR spending. Research has found that firms that had been convicted of bribery in the US under the Foreign Corrupt Practices Act (FCPA) received more lenient fines if they had been seen to be actively engaging in comprehensive CSR practices. It was found that typically either a 20% increase in corporate giving or a commitment to eradicating a significant labour issue, such as child labour, was equated to a 40% lower fine in the case of bribing foreign officials.

Aguinis and Glavas conducted a comprehensive review of CSR literature, covering 700 academic sources from numerous fields, including organizational behavior, corporate strategy, marketing, and HRM. It was found that the primary reason for firms to engage in CSR was the expected financial benefits associated with CSR, rather than being motivated by a desire to be responsible to society. Consistent with this analysis, consumers respond less favorably to CSR initiatives that they believe are tainted with self-serving motives".

=== Ethical ideologies ===
CEOs' political ideologies are evident manifestations of their different personal views. Each CEO may exercise different powers according to their organizational outcomes. Their political ideologies are expected to influence their preferences for CSR outcomes. Proponents argue that politically liberal CEOs will envision the practice of CSR as beneficial and desirable to increase a firm's reputation. They tend to focus more on how the firm can meet the needs of society. Consequently, they will advance with the practice of CSR while adding value to the firm. On the other hand, property rights may be more relevant to conservative CEOs. Since conservatives tend to value free markets, individualism, and the call for respect of authority, they will not likely envision this practice as often as those identifying as liberals might.

The company's financials and the CSR practice also have a positive relationship. Moreover, a company's performance tends to influence conservatives more likely than liberals. While not seeing it from the financial performance point of view, liberals tend to believe that CSR adds to the business's triple bottom line. For example, when the company performs well, it will promote CSR. If the company is not performing as expected, they will rather tend to emphasize this practice because it will potentially envision it as a way to add value to the business. In contrast, politically conservative CEOs will tend to support the practice of CSR if they believe that it will provide a good return to the company's financials. In other words, these types of executives tend to not see the outcome of CSR as a value to the company if it does not provide anything in exchange.

=== Misdirection ===
There have been unsubstantiated social efforts, ethical claims, and outright greenwashing by some companies that have resulted in increasing consumer cynicism and mistrust. Sometimes companies use CSR to direct public attention away from other, harmful business practices. For example, McDonald's positioned its association with Ronald McDonald House and other children's charities as CSR while its meals have been accused of promoting poor eating habits.

Acts that may initially appear to be altruistic CSR may have ulterior motives. The funding of scientific research projects has been used as a source of misdirection by firms. Stanley B. Prusiner, who discovered the protein responsible for Creutzfeldt–Jakob disease (CJD) and won the 1997 Nobel Prize in Medicine, thanked the tobacco company RJ Reynolds for their crucial support. RJ Reynolds funded the research into CJD. Proctor states that "the tobacco industry was the leading funder of research into genetics, viruses, immunology, air pollution", anything which formed a distraction from the well-established research linking smoking and cancer.

Research has also found that corporate social marketing, a form of CSR promoting societal good, is being used to direct criticism away from the damaging practices of the alcohol industry. It has been shown that advertisements that supposedly encourage responsible drinking simultaneously aim to promote drinking as a social norm. In this case, companies may engage in CSR and social marketing to prevent more stringent government legislation on alcohol marketing.

=== Controversial industries ===
Industries such as tobacco, alcohol, or munitions firms make products that damage their consumers or the environment. Such firms may engage in the same philanthropic activities as other industries. This conflict complicates assessments of such firms concerning CSR.

In a case study, researchers from the Global Conference on Business, Economics, Management, and Tourism examined the correlation between CSR policies and value creation/financial performance in the banking industry, and found that benefits include greater economic efficiency, improved company reputation, and employee loyalty, better communication streamline between the industry and individuals, and the opportunity to attract new opportunities (i.e. attract new investments, or remain competitive) and improve organizational commitment. However, before discussing these effects, the researchers preceded the analysis by stating that typically implementing CSR and other ethical principles within the framework of a financial institution such as banks make it seem as if these are marketing tools for attracting and communicating with stakeholders rather than serving as tools that allow banks and other financial institutions to benefit the individuals that they serve. In another case study, Hein Schreuder discussed the evolution of CSR at the Dutch multinational corporation DSM.

== Stakeholder influence ==
One motivation for corporations to adopt CSR is to satisfy stakeholders beyond those of a corporation's shareholders.

Branco and Rodrigues (2007) describe the stakeholder perspective of CSR as the set of views of corporate responsibility held by all groups or constituents with a relationship to the firm. In their normative model, the company accepts these views as long as they do not hinder the organization. The stakeholder perspective fails to acknowledge the complexity of network interactions in cross-sector partnerships. It relegates communication to a maintenance function, similar to the exchange perspective.

=== Ethical consumerism ===
The rise in popularity of ethical consumerism over the last two decades can be linked to the rise of CSR. Consumers are becoming more aware of the environmental and social implications of their day-to-day consumption decisions and in some cases make purchasing decisions related to their environmental and ethical concerns.

One issue with the consumer's relationship with CSR is that it is much more complex than it first appears. This phenomenon could be described as the "CSR-Consumer Paradox" or mismatch, where consumers report that they would only buy from companies with good social responsibility. Many consumers want to buy from responsible companies, but surveys indicate that "ethical purchases" are a small percentage of household expenditures. The discrepancy between consumer beliefs and intentions, and actual consumer behaviour, means CSR has a much lesser impact than consumers initially say.

One theory for explaining this discrepancy is the "bystander apathy" or the bystander effect. This theory stems from social psychology and states that the likelihood of an individual acting in a given situation is significantly reduced if other bystanders do nothing, even if that individual strongly believes in a specific course of action. It would suggest an "If they do not care then why should I?" mentality. Even if consumers are against the use of sweatshops or want to support green causes, they may continue to make purchases from companies that are socially irresponsible just because other consumers seem apathetic towards the issue.

Another explanation is that of reciprocal altruism. In the evolutionary psychology of human behaviour: people only do something if they can get something back in return. In the case of CSR and ethical consumerism, however, consumers get very little in return for their investment. Ethically sourced or manufactured products are typically higher in price due to greater costs. However, the reward for consumers is not much different from that of a non-ethical counterpart. Therefore, evolutionary speaking, making an ethical purchase is not worth the higher cost to the individual, even if they believe in supporting ethical, environmental, and socially beneficial causes.

=== Socially responsible investing ===
Shareholders and investors, through socially responsible investing (SRI), are using their capital to encourage behavior they consider responsible. However, definitions of what constitutes ethical behavior vary. For example, some religious investors in the United States have withdrawn investments from companies that violate their religious views. In contrast, secular investors divest from companies that they see as imposing religious views on workers or customers.

=== Public policies ===
Some national governments promote socially and environmentally responsible corporate practices. The heightened role of government in CSR has facilitated the development of numerous CSR programs and policies. Various European governments have pushed companies to develop sustainable corporate practices. CSR critics such as Robert Reich argued that governments should set the agenda for social responsibility with laws and regulations that describe how to conduct business responsibly.

Collective bargaining is a way nations promote CSR. In Germany, CSR is kept at the industry level instead of the workplace; this has been viewed as one of the strengths of the German government's push for CPR. Germany also established the German Trade Union Confederation in 1949 to further advance CSR; the confederation represents the interests of 45 million workers in Germany. Job security, wage increases with industry growth are key aspects of collective bargaining in the German labor system.

There is a higher percentage of workers in unions in countries like Sweden and Iceland which have more Social-Democratic elements in their Nordic Model than the U.S. and the U.K.

The U.S. and the U.K. are Liberal Market Economies (LMEs), and the German economy falls under Coordinated Market Economy (CMEs), which are Varieties of Capitalism. In comparison with the U.S. that covers 25.5% of its blue and white-collar workforce under collective bargaining and the U.K. that covers 29% of its workforce, Germany covers a significantly higher 57% of its workforce under collective bargaining.

==== Regulation ====
Fifteen European Union countries are actively engaged in CSR regulation and public policy development. CSR efforts and policies are different among countries, responding to the complexity and diversity of governmental, corporate, and societal roles. Some studies have claimed that the role and effectiveness of these actors were case-specific. This variety among company approaches to CSR can complicate regulatory processes.

Canada adopted CSR in 2007. Prime Minister Harper encouraged Canadian mining companies to meet Canada's newly developed CSR standards.

The 'Heilbronn Declaration' is a voluntary agreement between enterprises and institutions in Germany, especially in the Heilbronn-Franconia region, signed on 15 September 2012. The approach of the Heilbronn Declaration targets the decisive factors of success or failure, the achievements of the implementation, and best practices regarding CSR. A form of responsible entrepreneurship shall be initiated to meet the requirements of stakeholders' trust in the economy. It is an approach to make voluntary commitments more binding.

In opposition to mandated CSR regulation, researchers Armstrong and Green suggest that all regulation is "harmful", citing regulation as the cause of North Korea's low economic freedom and per capita GDP. They further claim without source that "There is no form of market failure, however egregious, which is not eventually made worse by the political interventions intended to fix it", and conclude "there is no need for further research on regulation in the name of social responsibility."

==== Laws ====
In the 1800s, the US government could take away a firm's license if it acted irresponsibly. Corporations were viewed as "creatures of the state" under the law. In 1819, the United States Supreme Court in Dartmouth College vs. Woodward established a corporation as a legal person in specific contexts. This ruling allowed corporations to be protected under the Constitution and prevented states from regulating firms. Countries have included CSR policies in government agendas.

On 16 December 2008, the Danish parliament adopted a bill that required the 1,100 largest Danish companies, investors, and state-owned companies to include CSR information in their financial reports. The reporting requirements became effective on 1 January 2009. The required information included:

- CSR/SRI policies
- How such policies are implemented in practice
- Results and management expectations

CSR/SRI is voluntary in Denmark, but if a company has no policy on this, it must state its position on CSR in financial reports.

In 1995, item S50K of the Income Tax Act of Mauritius mandated that companies registered in Mauritius pay 2% of their annual book profit to contribute to the social and environmental development of the country. In 2014, India also enacted a mandatory minimum CSR spending law. Under Companies Act, 2013, any company having a net worth of 500 crore or more or a turnover of 1,000 crore or a net profit of 5 crore must spend 2% of their net profits on CSR activities. The rules came into effect on 1 April 2014.

The only mandatory CSR Act in the world thus far was passed by the Indian parliament in 2013 as Section 135 of the Companies Act. According to that bill, all firms with a net worth above 5 billion rupees (approx. $75 million), turnover over 10 billion rupees (approx. $150 million), or net profit over 50 million rupees (approx. $750,000) are required to spend at least 2% of their annual profits (averaged over three years). The Act requires that all businesses affected establish a CSR committee to oversee the spending. Before this law was passed, CSR laws were applied only to public sector companies.

Unlike global definitions of CSR in the triple bottom line, corporate citizenship, sustainable business, business responsibility, and closed-loop realm, in India, CSR is a philanthropic activity. What has changed since formalizing it in 2014 is the shift in focus from institution building (schools, hospitals, etc.) to focus on community development.

=== Crises and their consequences ===
Crises have encouraged the adoption of CSR. The CERES principles were adopted following the 1989 Exxon Valdez incident. Other examples include the lead paint used by toymaker Mattel, which required the recall of millions of toys and caused the company to initiate new risk management and quality control processes. Magellan Metals was found responsible for lead contamination, which killed thousands of birds in Australia. The company ceased business immediately and had to work with independent regulatory bodies to execute a cleanup. Odwalla experienced a crisis, with sales dropping 90% and its stock price dropping 34% due to cases of E. coli. The company recalled all apple or carrot juice products and introduced a new process called "flash pasteurization", as well as maintaining lines of communication constantly open with customers.

== National and regional approaches ==
Corporations that employ CSR behaviors do not always behave consistently in all parts of the world. Conversely, a single behavior may not be considered ethical in all jurisdictions, e.g., some jurisdictions forbid women from driving, while others require women to be treated equally in employment decisions.

=== European Union ===
The European Commission presented a green paper for the European Communities, as the EU was then called, "promoting a European framework for Corporate Social Responsibility" in 2001. In that document CSR was defined as

a concept whereby companies integrate social and environmental concerns in their business operations and in their interaction with their stakeholders on a voluntary basis.

By 2011, the Commission recognised a "strategic approach" to CSR as "increasingly important too the competitiveness of enterprises". Believing that enterprises can "significantly contribute to the European Union's treaty objectives of sustainable development and a highly competitive social market economy", therefore presented a revised strategy in October 2011, A renewed EU strategy 2011–14 for Corporate Social Responsibility. In this document, CSR was defined more briefly as

the responsibility of enterprises for their impact on society.

In parallel with CSR, the alternative term "responsible business conduct" (RBC) introduced by the OECD (see OECD Guidelines for Multinational Enterprises) was also adopted. No longer treating CSR as a "voluntary" or is some sense "additional" aspect of managing an enterprise, the commission now stated that

enterprises should have in place a process to integrate social, environmental, ethical, human rights and consumer concerns into their business operations and core strategy in close collaboration with their stakeholders.

Actions planned under the 2011–2014 agenda were aimed at:

- Enhancing the visibility of CSR and disseminating good practices
- Improving and tracking levels of trust in business
- Improving self- and co-regulation processes
- Enhancing market reward for CSR
- Improving company disclosure of social and environmental information
- Further integrating CSR into education, training, and research
- Emphasising the importance of national and sub-national CSR policies, and
- Better aligning European and global approaches to CSR.

Subsequently, the Commission published a staff working document in March 2019 that examined the progress in implementing CSR/RBC as well as business and human rights.

=== UK retail sector ===
A 2006 study found that the UK retail sector showed the greatest rate of CSR involvement. Many of the big retail companies in the UK joined the Ethical Trading Initiative, an association established to improve working conditions and worker health.

Tesco (2013) reported that their 'essentials' are 'Trading responsibility', 'Reducing our Impact on the Environment', 'Being a Great Employer' and 'Supporting Local Communities'. J Sainsbury employs the headings 'Best for food and health', 'Sourcing with integrity', 'Respect for our environment', 'Making a difference to our community', and 'A great place to work', etc. The four main issues to which UK retail companies are committed: environment, social welfare, ethical trading, and becoming an attractive workplace.

Anselmsson and Johansson (2007) assessed three areas of CSR performance: human responsibility, product responsibility, and environmental responsibility. Martinuzzi et al. described the terms, writing that human responsibility is "the company deals with suppliers who adhere to principles of natural and good breeding and farming of animals, and also maintains fair and positive working conditions and workplace environments for their employees. Product responsibility means that all products come with a complete list of content, that country of origin is stated, and that the company will uphold its declarations of intent and assume liability for its products. Environmental responsibility means that a company is perceived to produce environmental-friendly, ecological, and non-harmful products". Jones et al. (2005) found that environmental issues are the most commonly reported CSR programs among top retailers.

=== US corporations ===
An article published in Forbes.com in September 2017 mentioned the yearly study of Boston-based reputation management consulting company Reputation Institute (RI) which rates the top 10 US corporations in terms of corporate social responsibility. RI monitors social responsibility reputations by focusing on the perception of consumers regarding company governance, positive impact on the community and society, and treatment of the workforce. It rates each criterion with the firm's proprietary RepTrak Pulse platform. Forbes identified companies like Lego, Microsoft, Google, Walt Disney Company, BMW Group, Intel, Robert Bosch, Cisco Systems, Rolls-Royce Aerospace, and Colgate-Palmolive.

According to the CSR Journal, the millennial generation worldwide helps propel brands toward social responsibility. Many millennials want to conduct business with companies and trademarks that employ pro-social themes, sustainable manufacturing processes, and ethical business practices. Nielsen Holdings published its Annual Global Corporate Sustainability Report in 2017 concentrating on global responsibility as well as sustainability. Nielsen's 2015 report showed that 66 percent of consumers will spend more on products that come from sustainable brands. Another 81 percent expect their preferred corporate institutions to reveal in public their statements about corporate citizenship

The National Association on the Advancement of Colored People (NAACP), through its chief executive officer Derrick Johnson, shared the organization's insights on how American corporations can help in the realization of social justice. According to the article from Yahoo News, the NAACP has been engaged in a crusade for racial justice and economic opportunities during the last 109 years. This organization believes all citizens in the United States must be held liable in ensuring democracy works for all people.

=== Latin America ===
A 2026 study examined the evolution of ESG reporting among publicly listed companies in six Latin American countries between 2014 and 2023. The research covered 300 companies operating across 11 economic sectors in Argentina, Brazil, Chile, Colombia, Mexico and Peru. The findings of the research indicated that Brazil and Chile have relatively well-established ESG reporting practices. Meanwhile, Peru, Argentina and Mexico have made notable progress in expanding corporate sustainability disclosure, whereas Colombia has experienced more gradual improvements throughout the years covered by the research.

=== India ===
From an Indian perspective, corporate social responsibility is not just about how an organization distributes its profits, but is also about how it generates its revenue. Corporate social responsibility is defined as the ethos and practice of discovering, invoking, infusing, evoking, and radiating the human values of 'righteousness' (dharma) and 'love' (Prema) in an organisation's interactions with its stakeholders. Stakeholders, in this definition, refers to the organisation's customers, employees, shareholders, society, natural environment, business associates, regulatory agencies, future generations, etc.

International field policy expert Edmond Fernandes has provided various ways in which Indian companies can increase their investment efficiency and investment sufficiency by integrating social health in all policies. Non-government organizations like CHD Group and SEEDS have demonstrated ways in which smart and efficient CSR is possible.

== Texts ==
- United Nations Guiding Principles on Business and Human Rights (2011)
- OECD Guidelines for Multinational Enterprises (2011)

== See also ==
- Beneficiation
- Berle–Dodd debate
- Business in the Community
- Business philosophy
- Carbon neutrality
- Carbon offset
- Chief green officer
- Civil society
- Conscious business
- Corporate behaviour
- Corporate governance
- Corporate personhood
- Corporate social entrepreneurship
- Corporate sociopolitical activism
- Corporate sustainability
- Customer engagement
- Development studies
- Enterprise 2020
- Environmentalism
- Ethical banking
- Ethical code
- Ethical job
- Ethical Positioning Index (EPI)
- Ethics
- Fair Stone standard
- Green economy
- Green job
- Inclusive business
- Interest of the company
- International development
- ISO 26000
- Life cycle assessment
- Matching gift
- Noblesse oblige
- OECD Guidelines for Multinational Enterprises
- Organizational ethics
- Organizational justice
- Psychopathy in the workplace
- Public opinion
- Responsible mining
- Responsible Research and Innovation
- Shareholder primacy
- Social development
- Social work
- Socially responsible investing
- Socially responsible marketing
- Stakeholder engagement
- Stakeholder engagement software
- Stakeholder management
- Sustainable finance
- Voluntary compliance
- Volunteer grant
