= Dení Ramírez Macías =

Mexican marine biologist

- Born: 9 May 1978; Mexico City
- Education: Centro de Investigaciones Biológicas del Noroeste. La Paz México, 2010, Dr.Sc; Centro Interdisciplinario de Ciencias Marinas, La Paz, México, 2005, M.Sc.; Department of Marine Biological Sciences, University of La Paz, 2002, B.Sc.
- Known for: Whale Shark Expert

Dení Ramírez Macías (also known as Dení Ramírez) is a Mexican marine biologist, ocean scientist, conservationist, and has been the director of Whale Shark México (Tiburon Ballena Mexico) since 2003. She leads the "Giants of Peru" project of the Save Our Seas Foundation.

Ecology Project International lists Ramírez among "women scientists who are saving the planet", and "one of the few experts on whale shark genetics in the world"; she helped the Mexican government develop management plans for whale shark tourism and conservation.

Ramírez helped form the nonprofit Hawai‘i Uncharted Research Collective, which she encouraged to collect whale shark sightings in the Hawaii region to help complete the picture of their lives.

Ramírez founded Conexiones TerraMar which promotes science, conservation and education.

== Biography ==
Dení Ramírez-Macías was born on May 9th 1978 in Mexico city; however, she spent two years in the Netherlands as a baby, returning to Mexico City at the age of three. Dení Ramírez-Macías spent her teens years in Cuernavaca and Tepoztlán. Ramírez fell in love with diving at the early age of 7 while in Chankanaab, Cozumel. This experience inspired her to complete a Doctor of Science in Biology specializing in whale shark population genetics.

== Career ==
Prior to her academic career, Ramírez created a non-profit organization that focused on environmental education, ConCiencia Mexico, with a group of friends. This NGO was initially inspired by Ramírez and her friends while cleaning beaches. This mentality of environmental education inspired Ramírez to pursue a career in academics, specifically marine biology. She continued her career in academics by focusing on her love for the ocean which brought her to work with large marine species such as whale sharks and manta rays. Ramírez has received grants from organizations such as WWF, Save our Seas Foundation, and Rufford foundation to fund her research. Dení Ramírez-Macías completed her Bachelor of Science degree in Marine Biology at University of La Paz, Mexico, her Master of Science with Honours in Marine Science through the Interdisciplinary Center of Marine Sciences in La Paz, Mexico and her Doctor of Science in Biology through the Northwest Biology Research Centre in La Paz Mexico. Her research has allowed her to travel to the Gulf of California to complete the first study in the world on whale shark population genetics. The field work for her PhD was completed in the Philippines where she collaborated with whale shark experts around the world investigating the whale shark population structure and abundance in the Gulf of California and Holbox Island. Her research continues to focus on the migratory patterns of whale sharks in the Gulf of California and surrounding areas, whale shark behaviour and contaminants. Ramírez has become a whale shark expert, like those she worked with in her PhD. She is now the Director of Whale Shark Mexico and has been active on the scientific committee for the last 2 International Whale Shark Conference in Australia. Additionally, she has been advising for whale sharks projects in Honduras, Hawaii and Venezuela. In 2016 she commenced a project in Peru working with EcOceanica, a Peruvian NGO, in addition to Save our Seas Foundation, to conserve whale sharks and their habitat. Her team is composed solely of females with a passion for marine animals and conservation. Recently, she founded a second non-profit organization, Conexiones TerraMar which promotes science, conservation and education.

Dení Ramírez-Macías’ passion extends beyond whale sharks into manta rays, which she has been studying in Archipelago of Revillagigedo since 2006. She performed ultrasounds to observe the pregnancy of the mantas in Ecuador in collaboration with Marine Megafauna Foundation of Ecuador and on Mobula munkiana from Isla Espiritu Santo in collaboration with Pelagios Kakunjá. Ramírez-Macías’s research has also been used in conservation of other marine species in addition to the creation of protected areas for whale sharks and their management.Ramírez helped form the nonprofit Hawai‘i Uncharted Research Collective, which she encouraged to collect whale shark sightings in the Hawaii region to help complete the picture of their lives.

== Awards ==
2021	Member of Women Divers Hall of Fame 2021.
2010	Sharks International Travel Award to assist Sharks International Conference, Cairns Australia, June 2010.
2008	Visiting Fellowship, from Mexican government to visit Australian Institute of Marine Science in Darwin, Australia.
2008	Special invitation (all expenses included) to assist “SoSF Shark & Ray Workshop”, Simons Town, South Africa 2008. Save our Seas Foundation.
2008	BSAC Duke of Edinburgh Award for Exercise Jurassic Park, Guadalupe & Revillagigedo Islands Mexico, 2008.
2005	Whale shark Conference Fellowship to participate in International Whale SharkConference, Perth Australia.

== Projects ==
2019	WWF-México program. Bahía concepción, una pieza más en el rompecabezas del tiburón ballena del Golfo de California Etapa I
2018	Rufford Foundation. The use of drones and fin cameras to assess the effect of tourism activities on whale shark behavior.
2017	PROCER Nacional 2016. Responsable técnico Bahía de La Paz de consorcio nacional proyecto: Caracterización de la actividad turística de la realizada con el Tiburón Ballena en aguas Nacionales.
2016	WWF- Programa México. Responsable técnico. Programa piloto en el uso de cámaras Go Pro y Drone para el estudio de comportamiento del tiburón ballena
2015	Wave Glider Acoustic Tagging Project Utila 2015-2016. Colaboracion con Whale Shark & Oceanic Research Center: WSORC y Liquid Robot
2015	Rufford Foundation. Responsable técnico. Use of drone to assess the effect on whale shark behavior by tourism activities
2015	PADI Foundation. Responsable técnico. Movements of the Whale Shark and giant manta ray of the Archipelago of Revillagigedo
2014	Rufford Foundation. Responsable técnico. Tiburón Ballena México
2014	WWF- Telcel Mexican Program. Gigantes del Océano: El Tiburón Ballena
2014	Save Our Seas Foundation. Evaluate the presence of whale shark “Rhincodon typus” off Peru
2013	WWF- Telcel Mexican Program. Gigantes del Océano: El Tiburón Ballena
2012	WWF- Telcel Mexican Program. Gigantes del Océano: El Tiburón Ballena
2011	WWF- Telcel Mexican Program. Monitoreo del Tiburón Ballena en La Paz BCS
2011	WWF- Telcel Mexican Program. El tiburón ballena especie emblemática de la Bahía de la Paz.
2010	WWF-Programa México. Manejo sustentable del tiburón ballena en la Bahía de la Paz.
2010	Save Our Seas Foundation. Whale shark migration in the Gulf of California.
2009	Save Our Seas Foundation. Whale shark migration in the Gulf of California.
2009	Project Aware Foundation. Whale shark migration in the Gulf of California.
2008	Save Our Seas Foundation. Whale shark migration in the Gulf of California.
2007	Save Our Seas Foundation. Population Ecology and Genetics of Whale Sharks in the Sea of Cortez (Gulf of California)

== Research Stays Abroad ==
2008	West Texas A&M University. Whale Shark population genetics, an approach using microsatellites markers. Researcher in charge: Rocky Ward.
2008	Australian Institute of Marine Science. Whale Shark Population structure and abundance from Isla Holbox. Researcher in charge: Mark Meekan.
2007	Northern Appalachian Research Laboratory, Wellsboro, Pennsylvania. The characterization of microsatellite markers to study whale shark population genetics. Researcher in charge: Rocky Ward.
2007	The Philippines, to collect tissue sample from whale sharks. Researcher in charge: Angela Quirós

== Students Supervised ==
2015	Co-Dirección de tesis de Maestría en Ciencias. Universidad de Southampton, Inglaterra. Tesis: “Condiciones oceanográficas y atmosféricas relacionadas con la presencia del tiburón ballena en la Bahía de La Paz”. Estudiante Simon Hilbourne.
2015	Co-Dirección de tesis de Maestría en Ciencias para el Desarrollo Sustentabilidad y Turismo. Universidad de Nayarit. Tesis: Efectos de la actividad turística de avistamiento sobre individuos de tiburón ballena (Rhincodon typus) en Bahía de Matanchen, San Blas, Nayarit. Estudiante Gala Esmeralda Pelayo del Real.
2009	Comisión revisora del trabajo de tesis titulado: “La región control del ADN mitocondrial como marcador molecular específico de Tiburón Ballena (Rhincodon typus)” Tesis de licenciatura presentado por Esmeralda Estrella Navarro Holm.

== Scholarships ==
2018	Travel ward para asistir y dar taller en “The Latin America and Caribbean Section of the Society for Conservation Biology”.
2010	Sharks International Travel Award. Para asistir al congreso Sharks International en Cairns Australia, Junio 2010.
2008	Invitación para la participación y asistencia en la conferencia internacional (todo pagado) “SoSF Shark & Ray Workshop”, Simons Town, Sudáfrica 2008 otorgada por Save our Seas Foundation.
2008	Becas Mixtas de Conacyt para estancias en el extranjero. Estancia de 2 meses en Australian Institute of Marine Science en Darwin, Australia.
2005	Apoyo para el viaje (Travel subside) para participar “International Whale Shark Conference”, Perth Australia.

== Publications ==
=== Journal articles ===
- Ramírez-Macías D, Queiroz N, Pierce SJ, Humphries NE, Sims DW, Brunnschweiler JM (2017-05-04). "Oceanic adults, coastal juveniles: tracking the habitat use of whale sharks off the Pacific coast of Mexico". PeerJ. 5. e3271. doi:10.7717/peerj.3271. ISSN 2167-8359. PMC 5420197. PMID 28484673.
- Fossi MC, Baini M, Panti C, Galli M, Jiménez B, Muñoz-Arnanz J, Marsili L, Finoia MG, Ramírez-Macías D (September 2017). "Are whale sharks exposed to persistent organic pollutants and plastic pollution in the Gulf of California (Mexico)? First ecotoxicological investigation using skin biopsies". Comparative Biochemistry and Physiology Part C: Toxicology & Pharmacology. 199: 48–58. doi:10.1016/j.cbpc.2017.03.002. hdl:11365/1005006. ISSN 1532-0456. PMID 28274762.
- Norman BM, Holmberg JA, Arzoumanian Z, Reynolds SD, Wilson RP, Rob D, Pierce SJ, Gleiss AC, de la Parra R, Galvan B, Ramirez-Macías D (December 2017). "Undersea Constellations: The Global Biology of an Endangered Marine Megavertebrate Further Informed through Citizen Science" (PDF). BioScience. 67 (12): 1029–1043. doi:10.1093/biosci/bix127. ISSN 0006-3568.
- Ramírez-Amaro S, Ramírez-Macías D, Vázquez-Juárez R, Flores-Ramírez S, Galván-Magaña F, Gutiérrez-Rivera JN (2017-03-31). "Population structure of the Pacific angel shark (Squatina californica) along the northwestern coast of Mexico based on the mitochondrial DNA control region". Ciencias Marinas (in English and Spanish). 43 (1): 69–80. doi:10.7773/cm.v43i1.2692. ISSN 2395-9053.
- Vignaud T, Maynard JA, Leblois R, Meekan MG, Vázquez-Juárez R, Ramírez-Macías D, Pierce SJ, Rowat D, Berumen ML, Beeravolu C, Baksay S, Planes S (May 2014). "Genetic structure of populations of whale sharks among ocean basins and evidence for their historic rise and recent decline". Molecular Ecology. 23 (10): 2590–2601. Bibcode:2014MolEc..23.2590V. doi:10.1111/mec.12754. ISSN 1365-294X. PMID 24750370. S2CID 8219725.
- Ramírez-Macías D, Vázquez-Haikin A, Vázquez-Juárez R (August 2012). "Whale shark Rhincodon typus populations along the west coast of the Gulf of California and implications for management" (PDF). Endangered Species Research. 18 (2): 115–128. doi:10.3354/esr00437.
- Ramírez-Macías D, Meekan M, de la Parra-Venegas R, Remolina-Suárez F, Trigo-Mendoza M, Vázquez-Juárez R (April 2012). "Patterns in composition, abundance and scarring of whale sharks Rhincodon typus near Holbox Island, Mexico". Journal of Fish Biology. 80 (5): 1401–1416. Bibcode:2012JFBio..80.1401R. doi:10.1111/j.1095-8649.2012.03258.x. ISSN 1095-8649. PMID 22497390.
- Ramírez-Macías D, Shaw K, Ward R, Galván-Magaña F, Vázquez-Juárez R (May 2009). "Isolation and characterization of microsatellite loci in the whale shark (Rhincodon typus)". Molecular Ecology Resources. 9 (3): 798–800. doi:10.1111/j.1755-0998.2008.02197.x. ISSN 1755-098X. PMID 21564747. S2CID 205969528.
- Ramírez-Macías D, Vázquez-Juárez R, Galván-Magaña F, Munguía-Vega A (March 2007). "Variations of the mitochondrial control region sequence in whale sharks (Rhincodon typus) from the Gulf of California, Mexico". Fisheries Research. 84 (1): 87–95. doi:10.1016/j.fishres.2006.11.038. ISSN 0165-7836.
- Ramírez-Macías D, Vázquez-Juárez R, Galván-Magaña F, de la Parra R (2007). "Variabilidad genética del tiburón ballena (Rhincodon typus) en dos poblaciones aisladas: Caribe (Isla Holbox) y Golfo de California" [Genetic Variability of the Shark Whale (Rhincodon typus) in Two Isolated Populations: The Caribbean (Holbox Island) and Gulf of California] (PDF). Proceedings of the Gulf and Caribbean Fisheries Institute (in Spanish). Vol. 59. pp. 541–548.
- Ramírez-Macías D, Vázquez Juárez R (2009). "Tiburón ballena gigante de los Océanos". Ciencia y Desarrollo (in Spanish). 35: 32–37. ISSN 0185-0008.

=== Books ===
- Ramírez-Macías, Dení (2013). Genética del tiburón ballena y estimación de abundancia en México (in Spanish). Publicia. ISBN 978-3639551457.
