= CEQ =

CEQ may refer to:

- Council on Environmental Quality, an agency of the United States federal government
- Centrale des syndicats du Québec, a trade union in Quebec, Canada (previously named Corporation des enseignants du Québec)
- Common ordinary equity, the common shareholders' interest in a company
- Covalence EthicalQuote, a market index tracking reputation of companies on ethical performance
- Cannes–Mandelieu Airport, by IATA code
