= Outline of Chile =

Country in South America

The Flag of Chile

The Coat of arms of Chile

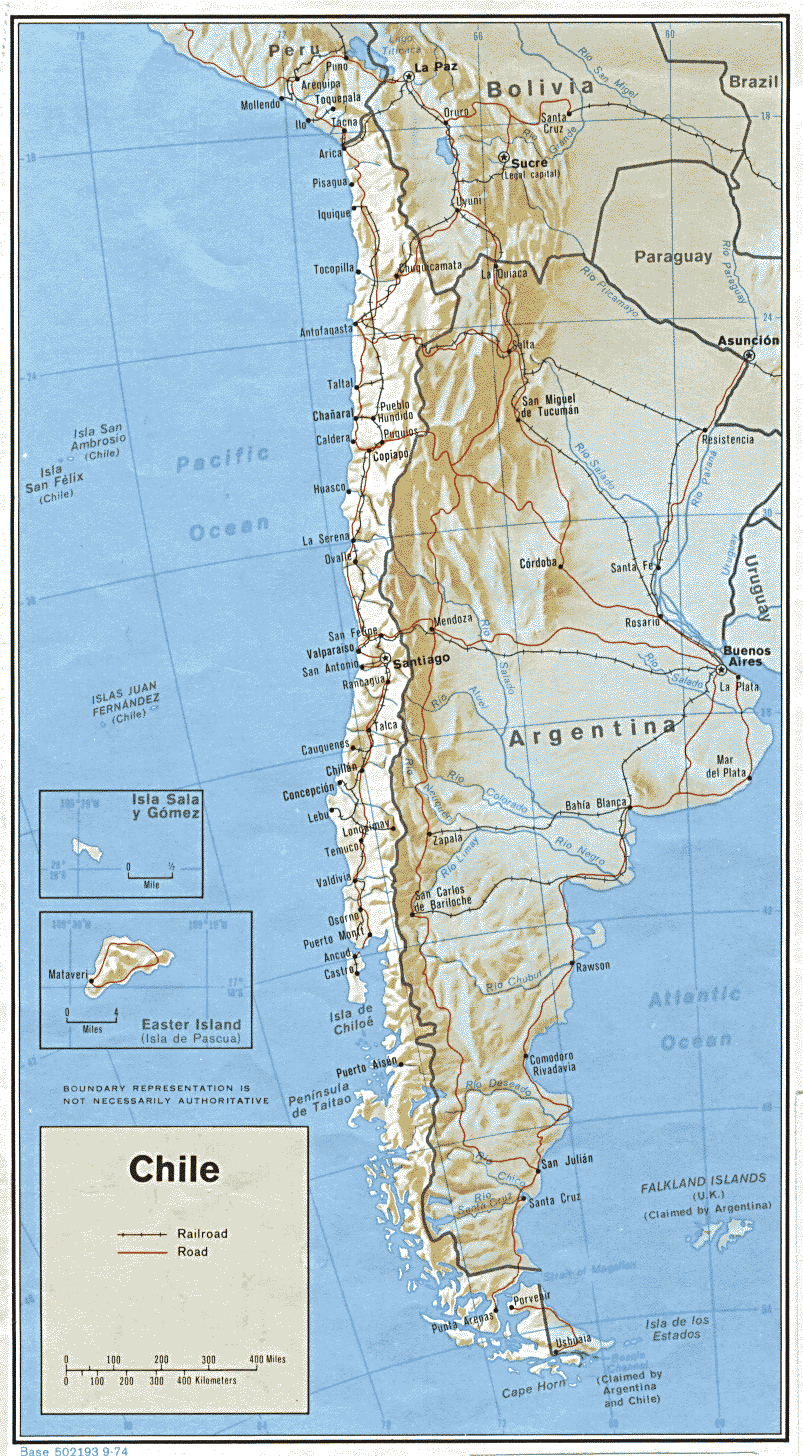
An enlargeable relief map of Chile

The following outline is provided as an overview of and topical guide to Chile:

Chile, officially the Republic of Chile, is a country in western South America. It is the southernmost country in the world and the closest to Antarctica, extending along a narrow strip of land between the Andes Mountains and the Pacific Ocean. According to the 2024 census, Chile had an enumerated population of 18.5 million. The country covers a territorial area of 756,102 square kilometers (291,933 sq mi), sharing borders with Peru to the north, Bolivia to the northeast, Argentina to the east, and the Drake Passage to the south. It also administers several Pacific islands, including Juan Fernández, Isla Salas y Gómez, Desventuradas, and Easter Island, and claims about 1,250,000 square kilometers (480,000 sq mi) of Antarctica as the Chilean Antarctic Territory. The capital and largest city is Santiago, and the official and national language is Spanish.

== General reference ==
- Pronunciation: /ˈtʃɪli/ CHIL-ee, Spanish: [ˈtʃile]
- Common English country name: Chile
- Official English country name: The Republic of Chile
- Ethnic structure of Chile: 60% White 39% Mestizo 1% Indigenous
- Common endonym(s): Chile
- Official endonym(s): República de Chile
- Adjectival(s): Chilean
- Demonym(s): Chilean
- Etymology: Name of Chile
- International rankings of Chile
- ISO country codes: CL, CHL, 152
- ISO region codes: See ISO 3166-2:CL
- Internet country code top-level domain: .cl

== Geography of Chile ==
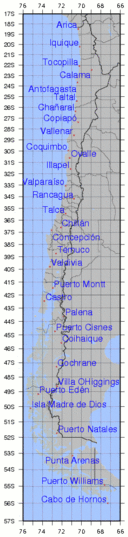
Click over the map to obtain a topographic map of the region and its toponymy.

Geography of Chile

- Chile is: a country
- Location:
  - Southern Hemisphere
  - Western Hemisphere
    - Latin America
      - South America
        - Southern Cone
  - Time zones:
    - Easter Island – UTC-06, October–March UTC-05
    - Rest of Chile (Except Magallanes Region)– UTC-04, October–March UTC-03
    - Magallanes Region - UTC-03
  - Extreme points of Chile
    - High: Ojos del Salado 6,893 m (22,615 ft)
    - Low: South Pacific Ocean 0 m
    - North: tripartite border with Bolivia and Peru
    - Southernmost point can be either:
      - Mainland: Águila Islet, Diego Ramírez Islands
      - Including Antártica: The South Pole
    - Westernmost point: Motu Nui, off Easter Island
    - Easternmost point can be either:
      - Mainland: Nueva Island
      - Including Antártica: the 53rd meridian west over Antarctica
  - Land boundaries: 6,339 km (3,939 mi)

Argentina 5,308 km (3,298 mi)
Bolivia 860 km (534 mi)
Peru 171 km (106 mi)

- Coastline: 6,435 km (3,999 mi)

- Population of Chile: 16,763,470 (2008) - 63rd most populous country
- Area of Chile: 756,950 km^{2} (292,260 sq mi) - 38th largest country
- Atlas of Chile

=== Environment of Chile ===
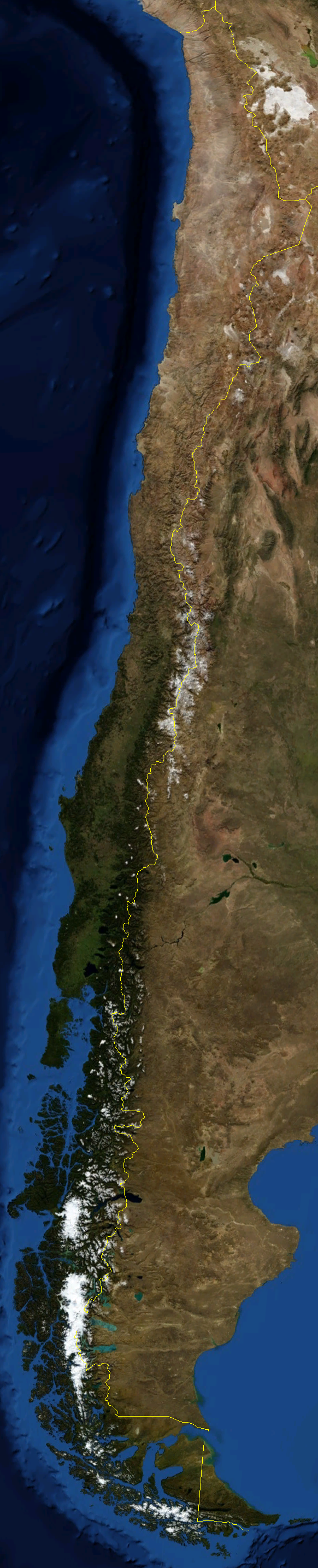
An enlargeable satellite image of Chile

- Climate of Chile
- Environmental issues in Chile
- Ecoregions in Chile
- Renewable energy in Chile
- Geology of Chile
  - Earthquakes in Chile
  - Volcanism of Chile
- Protected areas of Chile
  - Biosphere reserves in Chile
  - National parks of Chile
- Wildlife of Chile
  - Flora of Chile
  - Fauna of Chile
    - Birds of Chile
    - Mammals of Chile

==== Natural geographic features of Chile ====
- Glaciers of Chile
- Islands of Chile
- Lakes of Chile
- Mountains of Chile
  - Volcanoes in Chile
- Rivers of Chile
- World Heritage Sites in Chile

=== Regions of Chile ===
==== Ecoregions of Chile ====
List of ecoregions in Chile

==== Administrative divisions of Chile ====
Administrative divisions of Chile

- Regions of Chile
  - Provinces of Chile
    - Communes of Chile

===== Cities of Chile =====
List of cities in Chile

- Capital of Chile: Santiago

=== Demography of Chile ===
Demographics of Chile

== Government and politics of Chile ==
Politics of Chile

- Form of government: presidential representative democratic republic
- Capital of Chile: Santiago
- Elections in Chile
- Political parties in Chile
- Political scandals in Chile

=== Branches of government ===
Government of Chile

==== Executive branch of the government of Chile ====
- Head of state: President of Chile, José Antonio Kast (2026-)
- Head of government: President of Chile, José Antonio Kast (2026-)
- Cabinet of Chile

==== Legislative branch of the government of Chile ====
- National Congress of Chile (bicameral)
  - Upper house: Senate of Chile
  - Lower house: Chamber of Deputies of Chile

==== Judicial branch of the government of Chile ====
Court system of Chile

- Supreme Court of Chile

=== Foreign relations of Chile ===
Foreign relations of Chile

- List of diplomatic missions in Chile
- List of diplomatic missions of Chile

==== International organization membership ====
The Republic of Chile is a member of:

- Agency for the Prohibition of Nuclear Weapons in Latin America and the Caribbean (OPANAL)
- Andean Community of Nations (CAN) (associate)
- Asia-Pacific Economic Cooperation (APEC)
- Bank for International Settlements (BIS)
- Central American Integration System (SICA) (observer)
- Food and Agriculture Organization (FAO)
- Group of 15 (G15)
- Group of 77 (G77)
- Inter-American Development Bank (IADB)
- International Atomic Energy Agency (IAEA)
- International Bank for Reconstruction and Development (IBRD)
- International Chamber of Commerce (ICC)
- International Civil Aviation Organization (ICAO)
- International Criminal Court (ICCt) (signatory)
- International Criminal Police Organization (Interpol)
- International Development Association (IDA)
- International Federation of Red Cross and Red Crescent Societies (IFRCS)
- International Finance Corporation (IFC)
- International Fund for Agricultural Development (IFAD)
- International Hydrographic Organization (IHO)
- International Labour Organization (ILO)
- International Maritime Organization (IMO)
- International Mobile Satellite Organization (IMSO)
- International Monetary Fund (IMF)
- International Olympic Committee (IOC)
- International Organization for Migration (IOM)
- International Organization for Standardization (ISO)
- International Red Cross and Red Crescent Movement (ICRM)
- International Telecommunication Union (ITU)
- International Telecommunications Satellite Organization (ITSO)
- International Trade Union Confederation (ITUC)
- Inter-Parliamentary Union (IPU)
- Latin American Economic System (LAES)
- Latin American Integration Association (LAIA)
- Multilateral Investment Guarantee Agency (MIGA)
- Nonaligned Movement (NAM)
- Organisation for Economic Co-operation and Development (OECD) (accession state)
- Organisation for the Prohibition of Chemical Weapons (OPCW)
- Organization of American States (OAS)
- Permanent Court of Arbitration (PCA)
- Rio Group (RG)
- Southern Cone Common Market (Mercosur) (associate)
- Unión Latina
- Union of South American Nations (UNASUR)
- United Nations (UN)
- United Nations Conference on Trade and Development (UNCTAD)
- United Nations Educational, Scientific, and Cultural Organization (UNESCO)
- United Nations High Commissioner for Refugees (UNHCR)
- United Nations Industrial Development Organization (UNIDO)
- United Nations Military Observer Group in India and Pakistan (UNMOGIP)
- United Nations Stabilization Mission in Haiti (MINUSTAH)
- United Nations Truce Supervision Organization (UNTSO)
- Universal Postal Union (UPU)
- World Confederation of Labour (WCL)
- World Customs Organization (WCO)
- World Federation of Trade Unions (WFTU)
- World Health Organization (WHO)
- World Intellectual Property Organization (WIPO)
- World Meteorological Organization (WMO)
- World Tourism Organization (UNWTO)
- World Trade Organization (WTO)

=== Law and order in Chile ===
Law of Chile

- Cannabis in Chile
- Constitution of Chile
- Crime in Chile
- Human rights in Chile
  - LGBT rights in Chile
  - Freedom of religion in Chile
- Law enforcement in Chile

=== Military of Chile ===
Military of Chile

- Command
  - Commander-in-chief:
    - Ministry of Defence of Chile
- Forces
  - Army of Chile
  - Navy of Chile
  - Air Force of Chile
  - Lautaro Special Operations Brigade

=== Local government in Chile ===
Local government in Chile

== History of Chile ==
History of Chile

- Timeline of the history of Chile
- Current events of Chile

== Culture of Chile ==
Culture of Chile

- Architecture of Chile
- Cuisine of Chile
- Languages of Chile
- National symbols of Chile
  - Coat of arms of Chile
  - Flag of Chile
  - National anthem of Chile
- People of Chile
- Prostitution in Chile
- Public holidays in Chile
- Religion in Chile
  - Christianity in Chile
  - Hinduism in Chile
  - Islam in Chile
  - Judaism in Chile
- World Heritage Sites in Chile

=== Media in Chile ===
- Art in Chile
  - Museums in Chile
- Cinema of Chile
- Literature of Chile
- Music of Chile
- Newspapers in Chile
- Television in Chile
- Theatre in Chile
  - Municipal Theatre of Santiago
  - Ictus Theatre

=== Sports in Chile ===
- Football in Chile
- Chile at the Olympics

== Economy and infrastructure of Chile ==
Economy of Chile

- Economic rank, by nominal GDP (2007): 43rd (forty-third)
- Agriculture in Chile
- Banking in Chile
  - Central Bank of Chile
- Communications in Chile
  - Internet in Chile
- Companies of Chile
- Currency of Chile: Peso
  - ISO 4217: CLP
- Energy in Chile
- Health care in Chile
- Mining in Chile
- Ministry of Finance
- Santiago Stock Exchange
- Tourism in Chile
- Transport in Chile
  - Airports in Chile
  - Rail transport in Chile
- Water supply and sanitation in Chile

== Education in Chile ==
Education in Chile

== See also ==
Chile

- List of Chile-related topics
- List of international rankings
- Member state of the United Nations
- Outline of geography
- Outline of South America
