= EPI =

EPI or Epi may refer to:

== Science and technology ==
=== Mathematics ===
- Epigraph (mathematics)
- Epimorphism
- Entropy power inequality, a result that relates to so-called "entropy power" of random variables
- Extreme physical information, a principle in information theory

=== Medicine and health ===
- Echo-planar imaging
- Epidemiology
- Epinephrine, a neurotransmitter
- Epinephrine (medication)
  - Epi-pen
- Exocrine pancreatic insufficiency, the inability to properly digest food due to a lack of digestive enzymes made by the pancreas
- Expanded Program on Immunization, a World Health Organization program

=== Biology ===
- Epidendrum, an orchid genus
- Epiphyllum hybrid, a cactus hybrid

=== Technology ===
- Episerver, a global e-commerce company
- Epitaxy, a semiconductor fabrication technique
- European Processor Initiative, a European project to build new low-power processors

=== Other sciences ===
- Eletrophotonic imaging, an imaging technique
- Epimer, one of a pair of diastereomers
- Epi-Paleolithic, an archaeological period

== Places ==
- Epi (island), in Vanuatu
- Portuguese India, also known as the Portuguese State of India (Portuguese: Estado Português da Índia)

== People ==
- Enkhjargal Dandarvaanchig (born 1968), Mongolian musician
- Epi Taione (born 1979), Tongan rugby union footballer
- Epi, (born c. 1988), anonymous British artist
- Juan Antonio San Epifanio (born 1959), Spanish basketball player

== Organisations ==
- Ecology Project International, an American environmental organization
- Economic Policy Institute, an American economic think tank
- Education Policy Institute, a British education think tank
- European Patent Institute, the professional association of European patent attorneys
- European Payments Initiative, a pan-European payment system

== Language ==
- EF English Proficiency Index, a ranking of countries by their English skills
- Epi languages, a family of languages spoken on Epi island

== Other uses ==
- Environmental Performance Index, quantifier of the environmental effect of a state's policies
- Ends per inch, the number of warp threads per inch of woven fabric
- Ethical positioning index, an index which measures how ethically a brand is positioned
- Exploding Plastic Inevitable, a series of multimedia events by Andy Warhol
