= Corporate sustainability =

Business strategy that focuses on sustainability as a core aspect of the business

Corporate sustainability is an approach aiming to create long-term stakeholder value through the implementation of a business strategy that focuses on the ethical, social, environmental, cultural, and economic dimensions of doing business. The strategies created are intended to foster longevity, transparency, and proper employee development within business organizations. Firms will often express their commitment to corporate sustainability through a statement of Corporate Sustainability Standards (CSS), which are usually policies and measures that aim to meet, or exceed, minimum regulatory requirements.

Corporate sustainability is often confused with corporate social responsibility (CSR), though the two are not the same. Bansal and DesJardine (2014) state that the notion of 'time' discriminates sustainability from CSR and other similar concepts. Whereas ethics, morality, and norms permeate CSR, sustainability only obliges businesses to make intertemporal trade-offs to safeguard intergenerational equity. Short-termism is the bane of sustainability.

== Origin ==
The phrase is derived from the concept of "sustainable development" and Elkington's (1997) "triple bottom line." The Brundtland Commission's Report, Our Common Future, defined sustainable development as "development that meets the needs of the present without compromising the ability of future generations to meet their own needs. It contains within it two key concepts:

1. "the concept of 'needs', in particular the essential needs of the world's poor, to which overriding priority should be given; and
2. "the idea of limitations imposed by the state of technology and social organization on the environment's ability to meet present and future needs."

The idea of meeting present economic needs without reducing the ability of future generations to meet their own economic needs became a popular approach in the business world's implementation of sustainable development, referred to as "corporate sustainable development."

"Triple bottom line" proposes that business goals were inseparable from the societies and environments within which they operate. While short-term economic gains could be pursued, failure to account the social and environmental impacts of these pursuits is believed to make those business practices unsustainable.

Therefore, in the literature, corporate sustainability is often referred to as a three-dimensional construct integrating social, environmental, and economic factors. Of these three dimensions, the social dimension is the least represented in current research, and further work on conceptualization is needed. Research primarily approaches the topic from a country and/or industry perspective.

Whether corporate sustainability can be measured remains contested. There are composite measures that include measures of environmental, social, corporate governance, and economic performance, such as the Complex Performance Indicator (CPI). And there are many different definitions of sustainability applied to and used by companies. It remains difficult to say whether a company or other actor is operating sustainably or not because "there is no generally accepted set of indicators that could clearly delineate a status of sustainability from one of unsustainability. Therefore, the global status of sustainability, as well as the exact status of different actors, such as countries, companies, or individuals, is almost impossible to measure."

== Scope ==
The most broadly accepted criterion for corporate sustainability constitutes a firm's efficient use of natural capital. Natural capital not only includes the responsible consumption of renewable and non-renewable resources, but also the preservation of vital ecosystem services such as climate regulation and water purification, which have no viable substitutes. Without balancing industrial inputs and outputs with nature’s regenerative capacities, firms risk contributing to long-term ecological unsustainability.This eco-efficiency is usually calculated as the economic value added by a firm in relation to its aggregated ecological impact.

Similar to the eco-efficiency concept but so far less explored is the second criterion for corporate sustainability. Socio-efficiency describes the relation between a firm's value added and its social impact. Whereas, it can be assumed that most corporate impacts on the environment are negative (apart from rare exceptions such as the planting of trees) this is not true for social impacts. These can be either positive (e.g. corporate giving, creation of employment) or negative (e.g. work accidents, human rights abuses).

Both eco-efficiency and socio-efficiency are concerned primarily with increasing economic sustainability. In this process they instrumentalise both natural and social capital aiming to benefit from win-win situations. Some point towards eco-effectiveness, socio-effectiveness, sufficiency, and eco-equity as four criteria that need to be met if sustainable development is to be reached.

Theorists agree that respect for issues other than economics is an important matter. The Business Case for Sustainability (BCS) has had many different approaches for ways to approve or disapprove the economic rationale for corporate sustainability management.

== Principles for corporate sustainability ==
Transparency
proposes that by having an engaging environment within a company and within the community it operates will improve performance and increase profits. This can be attained through open communications with stakeholders characterized by high levels of information disclosure, clarity, and accuracy.
Stakeholder engagement
is attained when a company educates its employees and outside stakeholders (customers, suppliers, and the entire community) and move them to act on matters such as waste reduction or energy efficiency.
Thinking ahead
Envisioning the future enables companies to generate fresh ideas for implementation. These ideas can either reduce productions costs, increase profits, or provide a better image for the organization.
Diversity, Equity and Inclusion
A a 2012 study by the University of California Berkeley's Haas School of Business found that companies with a high number of female board members were more likely to reduce their environmental impact and improve energy efficiency.

== Pillars of corporate sustainability ==
As previously mentioned, corporate sustainability can be seen through the lens of guiding principles: transparency, stakeholder engagement, thinking ahead, and DEI. However, another way to categorize these core principles is to separate between three key aspects of maintaining a sustainable business:

1. Environmental
2. Social Responsibility
3. Economic and Regulatory

While corporate sustainability is typically associated with solely environmental concerns, such as a carbon footprint reduction or a transition to clean energy sources, it is equally important that companies maintain these other two components. Specifically, social responsibility entails a company's treatment of employees, consideration for consumers, and broader community impacts, and economic sustainability encompasses a corporation's compliance to government regulations, transparency in accounting and reporting, and overall integrity with respect to larger policies and the markets they impact. Considering this separation, "transparency" would fall under economic and governmental, "stakeholder engagement" and "diversity, equity, and inclusion" would fall under social responsibility, and "thinking ahead" would be a general approach conducive to the execution and balancing of all three aspects.

== See also ==
- Sustainable business
- Sustainable finance
- Project finance
- EthicalQuote (CEQ)
- Environmental, social and corporate governance
- Index of sustainability articles

== Sources ==
- Atkinson, Giles (March 2000). "Measuring Corporate Sustainability". Journal of Environmental Planning and Management. 43 (2): 235–252. Bibcode:2000JEPM...43..235A. doi:10.1080/09640560010694. S2CID 154282221.
- Dyllick, Thomas; Hockerts, Kai (March 2002). "Beyond the business case for corporate sustainability". Business Strategy and the Environment. 11 (2): 130–141. Bibcode:2002BSEnv..11..130D. doi:10.1002/bse.323.
- van Marrewijk, Marcel (1 May 2003). "Concepts and Definitions of CSR and Corporate Sustainability: Between Agency and Communion". Journal of Business Ethics. 44 (2): 95–105. doi:10.1023/A:1023331212247. S2CID 189900614.
- Dunphy, Dexter Colboyd; Griffiths, Andrew; Benn, Suzanne (2003). Organizational Change for Corporate Sustainability: A Guide for Leaders and Change Agents of the Future. Psychology Press. ISBN 978-0-415-28740-1.
- Werbach, Adam. Strategy for Sustainability: a Business Manifesto. Boston, Mass.: Harvard Business, 2009. Print.
- "Strengthen Your Business by Developing Your Employees", by Leslie Levine—Business Resources, Advice and Forms for Large and Small Businesses, 2010
- "Walmart Sustainability Report 2010 – Environment – Waste." Walmartstores.com. Web. 1 July 2010.
- "Handbook on Corporate Social Responsibility in India", Sachin Shukla et al – PwC India, 2013.
