= International rankings of Chile =

The following are international rankings of Chile.

== General ==
Publisher	Index	Overall ranking	Lat. Am. ranking	Countries surveyed	% rank.	Date
Freedom House	Freedom in the World 2014	Free	—	195	—	2014/01
SOPAC/UNEP	2005 Environmental Vulnerability Index	Vulnerable	—	235	—	2005/05
The Heritage Foundation/The Wall Street Journal	2014^{[unfit]} Index of Economic Freedom	7 (mostly free)	1	178	4	2014/01
Fraser Institute	Economic Freedom of the World - 2013 ratings	11 ▼	1	152	7 ▼	2013/09
Yale University/Columbia University	Environmental Performance Index 2010	16 ▲	4	163	10	2010/01
International Policy Network	Institutional Quality Index	21 ▲	1	194	11	2011/06
Transparency International	2013 Corruption Perceptions Index	22 ▼	2 ▼	175	13 ▼	2013/12
New Economics Foundation	2012 Happy Planet Index	19	11	151	13	2012/06
World Economic Forum	Enabling Trade Index, 2010	18 ▲	1	125	14	2010/05
Fund for Peace	Failed States Index 2013	27 ▼ (152)	2 (19)	178	15 ▼	2013/07
Forbes	Best Countries for Business, 2013	22 ▼	1	145	15 ▼	2013/12
World Health Organization	The world health report 2000 - Health system performance (overall)	33	2	191	17	2000/06
Economist Intelligence Unit	Business Environment Rankings	15 ▲	1	82	18	2009/05
Institute for Economics and Peace/Economist Intelligence Unit	The Global Peace Index, 2013	31 ▼	2 ▼	162	19 ▼	2013/06
Economist Intelligence Unit	Democracy Index, 2014	32	3	167	19	2015/01
United Nations	E-Government Development Index 2012	39 ▼	1 ▲	190	21	2012/03
World Bank	Logistics Performance Index	32	1	150	21	2007/11
World Bank	Doing Business - Ease of Doing Business, 2012	39 ▲	1 ▲	183	21 ▲	2011/10
United Nations Development Programme	Human Development Report - Human Development Index 2013	40 ▲	1	187	21 ▲	2013/03
Property Rights Alliance	International Property Rights Index 2011	28 ▲	1	129	21	2011/03
World Economic Forum	Global Competitiveness Index, 2011-2012	31 ▼	1	142	22	2011/09
AccountAbility	Responsible Competitiveness Index 2007	24	1	108	22	2007/07
Grant Thornton	Global Dynamism Index 2012	12	1	50	24	2012/09
Legatum Institute	2013 Legatum Prosperity Index	35 ▼	3 ▼	142	25 ▲	2013/10
Charities Aid Foundation	World Giving Index, 2010	39	3	153	25	2010/09
Save the Children	2014 Mothers’ Index Rankings	47 ▲	4 ▲	178 ▲	26 ▲	2014/05
World Bank	Where is the Wealth of Nations? (2005) - Total wealth per capita	32	4	118	27	2005/09
World Economic Forum	The Global Information Technology Report 2012's Networked Readiness Index	39	2 ▼	142	27 ▲	2012/04
World Intellectual Property Organization	Global Innovation Index, 2026	51	1st	139	—	2026
KOF Swiss Economic Institute	KOF Index of Globalization 2008	34	1	122	28	2008/01
The Economist	The World in 2005 - Worldwide quality-of-life index, 2005	31	1	111	28	2004/11
Unesco	EFA Global Monitoring Report 2008 - EFA Development Index	37	3	129	29	2007/11
Yale University/Columbia University	2005 Environmental Sustainability Index	42	9	146	29	2005/01
Newsweek	The World's Best Countries	30	1	100	30	2010/08
FutureBrand/BBC World News	Country Brand Index 2011	34 ▲	4	113	30 ▲	2011/11
Sustainable Society Foundation	Sustainable Society Index 2010	46 ▼	5 ▼	151	30	2011/02
United Nations Development Programme	Human Development Report - Inequality-adjusted Human Development Index 2013	41 ▲	1 ▲	132	31 ▲	2013/03
Reporters without borders	World Press Freedom Index 2014	58 ▲	6	180	32 ▲	2014/02
Freedom House	Freedom of the Press 2013	64 (partly free) ▲	3	197	32 ▲	2013/05
International Telecommunication Union	ICT Development Index 2008	54 ▼	3 ▼	159	34	2010/02
World Economic Forum	Travel & Tourism Competitiveness Index 2011	57	6	139	41	2011/03
FedEx	The Power of Access - 2006 Access Index	32	1	75	43	2006/05
Economist Intelligence Unit/IBM Institute for Business Value	Digital economy rankings 2010	30	1	70	43	2010/06
Brown University	Seventh Annual Global e-Government Study (2007)	85 ▼	8	198	43	2007/07
Economist Intelligence Unit/Business Software Alliance	IT industry competitiveness index 2008	30 ▲	1	66	45	2008/09
Walk Free Foundation	Global Slavery Index 2013	74 (89)	11 (10)	162	46	2013/10
World Economic Forum	Financial Development Index 2012	29 ▲	1 ▲	62	47 ▲	2012/10
IMD International	World Competitiveness Scoreboard 2012	28 ▼	1	59	47	2012/05
United Nations Development Programme	Human Development Report - Technology Achievement Index 2001	37	4	72	51	2001/07
A.T. Kearney/Foreign Policy Magazine	Globalization Index 2007	43 ▼	2	72	60	2007/12
World Economic Forum	The Global Gender Gap Index 2013	91 ▼	17 ▼	136	67 ▼	2013/10
Anholt-GfK Roper	2011 Nation Brands Index	39	4	50	78	2011/11

=== Cities ===
- GaWC Inventory of World Cities, 2008: Santiago de Chile is an Alpha-ranked world city

=== Economic ===
- International Monetary Fund: GDP (nominal) per capita 2007, ranked 52 out of 182 countries
- International Monetary Fund: GDP (nominal) 2007, ranked 43 out of 179 countries

== Military ==
- The World Factbook: military funding, ranked 28 out of 169 countries
- CSIS: active troops, ranked 50 out of 165 countries

== Social ==
- Population ranked 60 out of 221 countries

== Technological ==
- The World Factbook: number of Internet users, ranked 32 out of 192 countries

== See also ==
- Lists of countries
- Lists by country
- List of international rankings
