= Fairstone =

Fairstone may refer to:

- Fairstone Bank, a Canadian financial institution, and its lending subsidiary Fairstone Financial
- Fair Stone standard, a social and environmental standard for the natural stone industry
