= Hawaiʻi Uncharted Research Collective =

Whale shark research organization

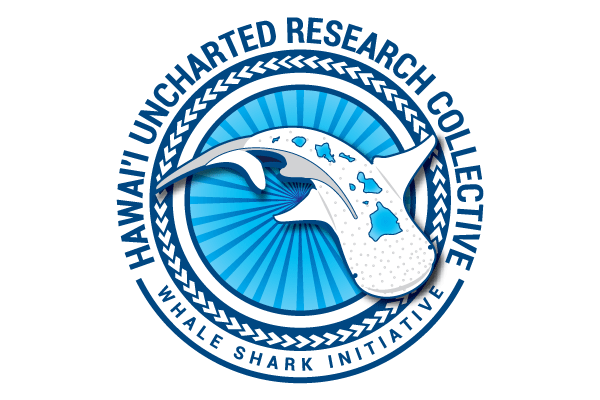

The Hawaiʻi Uncharted Research Collective (HURC) is a nonprofit marine ecology organization focused on whale shark research around the Hawaiian Islands. Director Maria Harvey, Chief Technical Scientist Travis Marcoux, and Chief Research Scientist Stacia Goecke have been working to "help increase knowledge of and awareness about whale sharks and produce scientific evidence that can inform conservation efforts".

HURC partners with other conservation and research organizations to collect and analyze whale shark data. One such organization is Whale Shark Mexico, founded by Dení Ramírez Macías, who was also instrumental in encouraging the formation of HURC.
