= Enterprise 2020 =

Enterprise 2020 was an initiative launched in October 2010 to address the European and global challenges that question patterns of living, working, learning, communicating, consuming and sharing resources. The initiative aimed to promote responsible and sustainable business practice and prepare businesses for emerging societal challenges across the globe, including climate change, demographic change, resource scarcity and increased urbanisation. In the context of the European Union's Europe 2020 strategy, Enterprise 2020 highlighted the contribution of businesses to achieve the EU goals for building a 'smart, sustainable and inclusive' economy delivering high levels of employment, productivity and social cohesion by 2020.

== The Enterprise 2020 company ==
The Enterprise 2020 initiative aimed to mainstream corporate social responsibility (CSR) and advance social innovation in all business functions; assessing and communicating their impacts; and through involvement with different stakeholder groups by 2020. The Enterprise 2020 company had been defined by CSR Europe, the European network for corporate social responsibility, "as a company that has fully integrated CSR into its business strategies" and meets the requirements to operate in a sustainable economy through goals of achieving smart, sustainable and inclusive growth.

Based on a shared vision of the enterprise of the future, Enterprise 2020 was a reference initiative for companies committed to developing innovative business practices and working together with their stakeholders to provide solutions to societal needs.

"The company of the future, Enterprise 2020, operates profitably through mainstreamed responsibility and transparency, and innovates solutions for the planet and its people, in closer cooperation with all stakeholders. Together they lead the transformation towards a smart, sustainable and inclusive society."

== Enterprise 2020 in the EU ==
In the context of the EU's Europe 2020 strategy, Enterprise 2020 provided the foundation for a renewed partnership between business and the European Commission, Council and Parliament. It supported the Commission's goal of "making Europe a pole of excellence on CSR" and promoting CSR as part of the European strategy for smart, sustainable and inclusive growth.

In its communication on CSR, the European Commission wrote:

"CSR Europe's Enterprise 2020 initiative is an example of business leadership in the field of CSR that is particularly relevant to EU policy objectives. The Commission will help to review the initial results of this initiative by the end of 2012, and to define its next steps."

Initiatives were launched under the auspices of Enterprise 2020 in several countries across Europe including Spain, Greece and Turkey, as well as on a global level, with China also partaking in the initiative.

== CSR Europe ==
Enterprise 2020 was an initiative developed by CSR Europe, the leading European business network for corporate social responsibility. The organisation was founded in 1995 by senior European business leaders in response to an appeal by the European Commission President Jacques Delors. It has since become a network of business people working on CSR across Europe and globally spanning a network which represents over 4500 companies in Europe. As of 10 May 2012, the organisation listed 71 multinational corporations as members. Furthermore, the CSR Europe network also stretches across 28 European states through the participation of 33 national partner organisations in the CSR Europe network.
