= List of ecoregions in Chile =

The following is a list of ecoregions in Chile as identified by the World Wide Fund for Nature (WWF).

== Terrestrial ecoregions ==
=== Tropical and subtropical moist broadleaf forests ===
- Rapa Nui and Sala-y-Gomez subtropical broadleaf forests

=== Temperate broadleaf and mixed forests ===
- Juan Fernández Islands temperate forests
- Magellanic subpolar forests
- San Felix-San Ambrosio Islands temperate forests
- Valdivian temperate rain forests

=== Temperate grasslands, savannas, and shrublands ===
- Patagonian grasslands
- Patagonian steppe

=== Montane grasslands and shrublands ===
- Central Andean dry puna
- Southern Andean steppe

=== Mediterranean forests, woodlands, and scrub ===
- Chilean matorral

=== Deserts and xeric shrublands ===
- Atacama Desert
- Sechura Desert

== Freshwater ecoregions ==
=== High Andean Complex ===
- Bolivian High Andean Complex
- Arid Puna

=== Atacama/Sechura Complex ===
- Atacama/Sechura Deserts

=== Pacific Coastal Desert Complex ===
- Pacific Coastal Deserts

=== Mediterranean Chile Complex ===
- North Mediterranean Chile
- South Mediterranean Chile

=== Juan Fernández Islands Complex ===
- Juan Fernández Islands

=== Southern Chile Complex ===
- Valdivian
- Chiloe Island
- Chonos Archipelago
- Magallanes/Ultima Esperanza

=== Patagonia Complex ===
- Tierra del Fuego-Rio Grande
