= AccountAbility =

- Formation: 1995; 31 years ago
- Founded at: London, United Kingdom
- Type: Nonprofit consultancy
- Legal status: Self-managed partnership
- Purpose: Consulting and standards for sustainability of companies
- Locations: New York City, United States; London, United Kingdom; Riyadh, Saudi Arabia; Dubai, United Arab Emirates
- Region served: Worldwide
- Services: Sustainability impact assessments, strategy design and implementation
- Official language: English
- Chief Executive: Sunil Misser
- Website: www.accountability.org

AccountAbility is an independent, global, not-for-profit organisation promoting accountability, sustainable business practices and corporate responsibility. It is a self-managed partnership, governed by its multi-stakeholder network.

AccountAbility's work is closely related to the Corporate Social Responsibility (CSR) field.

== History ==
AccountAbility was established in London, United Kingdom in 1995. The organization has offices in London, New York, Riyadh, and Dubai

== See also ==
- Corporate Social Responsibility (CSR)
- Global Reporting Initiative
- Social accounting
