= Common ordinary equity =

Common ordinary equity (CEQ) represents the common shareholders' interest in the company. CEQ is a component of shareholders' equity total (SEQ).

CEQ is the sum of:

- Common/ordinary stock (capital) (CSTK)
- Capital surplus/share premium reserve (CAPS)
- Retained earnings (RE)

less:

- Treasury stock total (all capital) (TSTK)

CEQ includes:

- Common stock outstanding, including treasury stock adjustments
- Capital surplus
- Retained earnings
- Treasury stock adjustments for both common and nonredeemable preferred stock

== See also ==
- Equity (finance)
- History of private equity and venture capital
- Private investment in public equity
- Publicly traded private equity
