= Berle–Dodd debate =

The Berle–Dodd debate is the name for a series of exchanges over the purposes of the corporation between the New Deal architect, A. A. Berle, and Merrick Dodd, a law professor. In this debate, Berle argued that corporations should "serve ... all society" through legally enforceable rules, and argued that shareholders' interests should ultimately be "equal" or "subordinated to a number of claims by labor, by customers and patrons, by the community". Dodd argued that corporate powers should be regarded as held on "trust" by directors and managers, and considered it "undesirable ... to give increased emphasis ... to the view that business corporations exist for the sole purpose of making profits for their stockholders". This debate has become well known in corporate governance, with widely conflicting interpretations, for the conflict over the extent to which corporations should pursue "shareholder value" or the "public interest". Berle and Dodd agreed that the corporation should pursue the public interest, but were initially at odds in how this was achieved.

== Background ==
Berle had been an adviser and attendee at the Versailles Peace Conference but like others he had returned disillusioned by the lack of progress, particularly in the claims of labor. His first paper argued that labor should control enterprises, through increasing ownership of stocks. He went on to write a textbook on corporate finance, adjusting his views, to say that this should not be individual ownership but diversified ownership through pension or other saving funds. After the Wall Street crash struck in 1929, Berle became an adviser and speech writer to the next presidential candidate for the Democratic Party, Franklin D. Roosevelt. He became an influential part of the Brains Trust and led the drafting of the Securities Act of 1933 and much of the concepts by the New Deal, including a new "economic declaration of rights".

Merrick Dodd was a professor at Harvard Law School, and decided to respond to Berle's 1931 article that argued directors needed to be held accountable in law.

== Exchange in Harvard Law Review ==
After the Wall Street crash and as the Great Depression unfolded, Berle argued in 1931 in the Harvard Law Review that it was better that there was shareholder control of companies than pure-director control. He originally stated that corporate powers should be used ‘only for the ratable benefit of all the shareholders’ as opposed to being left to director discretion: (1931) 44(7) Harvard LR 1049. This followed his view that directors of companies had become too unaccountable, and that tight legal control was needed. At this time, most shareholders were workers saving for retirement, because social security had been held illegal by the US Supreme Court. This meant people had saved vast sums of money in the stock markets: Berle thought directors should be accountable to them.

Responding to this article, Merrick Dodd stated he was "in sympathy with Mr. Berle's efforts to establish a legal control which will more effectually prevent corporate managers from diverting profit into their own pockets from those of stockholder" but that it was "undesirable, even with the laudable purpose of giving stockholders much-needed protection against self-seeking managers, to give increased emphasis at the present time to the view that business corporations exist for the sole purpose of making profits for their stockholders." He held up the examples of the executives and president of General Electric Company, who argued that to cure instability, "organized industry should take the lead, recognizing its responsibility to its employees, to the public, and to its stockholders rather than that democratic society should act through its government".

Berle quickly responded by clarifying that his 1931 article was merely a historical theory expressing the need for accountability to shareholders "as a matter of law", and the goal was to change this. However, wrote Berle, "you can not abandon emphasis on "the view that business corporations exist for the sole purpose of making profits for their stockholders" until such time as you are prepared to offer a clear and reasonably enforceable scheme of responsibilities to someone else." This is what Berle proposed to do, including through speeches that he had written for Franklin D. Roosevelt, by proposing "the development of an economic declaration of rights, an economic constitutional order." According to Berle, the "shareholder ... may ultimately be conceived of as having an equal participation with a number of other claimants" or be "subordinated to a number of claims by labor, by customers and patrons, by the community" but this needed to be worked out in enforceable laws, not just by giving managers power "on trust".

== Significance and interpretation ==
The Berle–Dodd debate has been widely cited and often misinterpreted as involving Berle, who represented a pro "shareholder value" stance, and Dodd, who represented a pro "public interest" stance. This takes Berle's original view out of context, as he had argued that while directors had been in 1931 bound to follow shareholder interests as a matter of law, this should not be the case. In later years, Berle said squarely that the law had changed, and his original theory that the law required directors to pursue shareholder profit was now completely reversed by 1954, so that the contention that directors' exercise of corporate "powers were held in trust for the entire community". The same remains true today including in the leading state of incorporation, Delaware.

== See also ==
- US corporate law
