= Estrella Navarro =

Mexican freediver and biologist (born 1992)

Estrella Navarro-Holm
- Born: Estrella Navarro; 28 November 1988 (age 37); La Paz, Baja California Sur, Mexico
- Occupations: free-diver, biologist, fashion model

Estrella Navarro-Holm (born 28 November 1988) is a marine biologist, model, and national record-holding free diver from Mexico. She is the first Latin American woman to win a free diving medal for holding a single breath for more than six minutes.

== Early life and education ==
Navarro is from La Paz in Baja California Sur, Mexico. Her father, a swim-coach, taught her to swim at an early age. Navarro began modeling when she was 15 years old and placed sixth in Nuestra Belleza México in 2008.

She earned a degree in marine biology, specializing in shark biology and ecology, from the Autonomous University of Baja California Sur.

== Career ==
Navarro was scouted and initially trained by freediving instructor Aharon Solomons. Three months after beginning to learn the breathing and ear-equalizing techniques necessary for freediving, she broke a national Mexican record. In 2010, Navarro began training with Italian coach Andrea Zuccari. She can hold her breath for many minutes and regularly dives deeper than 55 meters. She also participates in conservation efforts by appearing in documentaries and other media. And she works as an underwater and fashion model.

In 2015, Navarro founded and organized the Big Blue freediving competition in her home state. It is the first international freediving competition in Baja Sur and promotes marine conservation. The event takes place in the waters off of Isla Espíritu Santo, Baja, Mexico. She organized it in cooperation with AIDA Mexico and diving equipment manufacturer Cressi. Inaugural attendees were to include Alexey Molchanov, Natalia Molchanova, and Carlos Coste.

== Records ==
Navarro has won two international freediving medals. She is the first woman from Mexico to win a medal at the AIDA Individual Depth World Championships, the world championships of free diving. She won the bronze medal in the Constant Weight No Fins (CNF) category against 150 other divers.

Navarro has broken national free diving records for Mexico 26 times. In the 2015 Caribbean Cup in Roatan, Honduras, she broke three diving records for Mexico.

In 2017, Navarro dove to a depth of 75 meters in Sharm El-Sheikh, Egypt in the Free Immersion (FIM) and Constant Weight Fins (CWT) categories. The record dive was validated by AIDA International at the Freediving World Apnea Center. She made the dive with a single large fin called a monofin.

In 2019, Navarro broke another record for Mexico, diving 60 meters with bi-fins as part of the México en Buceo Libre competition in waters off of Bacalar, Quintaana Roo.

Videos of her diving are available.

== Publications ==
- Cisneros-Montemayor, A., Barnes-Mauthe, M., Al-Abdulrazzak, D., Navarro-Holm, E., & Sumaila, U. (2013). Global economic value of shark ecotourism: Implications for conservation. Oryx, 47(3), 381–388. doi: 10.1017/S0030605312001718
