= Ecology Project International =

Ecology Project International (EPI)

- Abbreviation: EPI
- Formation: October 2001; 23 years ago
- Founder: Scott Pankratz; Julie Osborn
- Type: Nonprofit
- Tax ID no.: 91-2163952
- Legal status: 501(c)(3)
- Headquarters: Missoula, Montana
- Board Chair: Nicole-Anne Boyer
- Board Chair: Charles Holmes
- Executive Director: Brant Warren
- Website: www.ecologyproject.org

Ecology Project International is a non-profit organization based in Missoula, Montana, dedicated to developing place-based, ecological education partnerships between local experts and youth (typically age 14-20) to address conservation issues. Ecology Project International (EPI) works with students and educators at seven program sites around the world: Belize, Costa Rica, mainland Ecuador, Galápagos Islands, Hawaii, Mexico, and Yellowstone.

EPI's programs typically run 5–14 days in some of the most biologically diverse and unique ecosystems in the world, where students work alongside professional land managers and research scientists.

EPI was founded on the principle that engaging locals is essential to the success of conserving biodiversity. The organization works to provide communication, mentorship, and learning between scientists and the general public. Since EPI's first field season, more than 45,000 participants have joined their field programs resulting in increased scientific literacy, and community-based conservation that is connected to the needs and priorities of the people who most impact the ecosystem.

== History ==
Co-founders Scott Pankratz and Julie Osborn worked in Costa Rica during the 1990s and recognized that despite the ample presence of international research teams and prolific scientific studies, many critical habitats and species continued to decline. Julie and Scott combined their educational and scientific expertise in 1998 and began formulating a plan to partner local students and communities with scientists working on critical conservation issues.

EPI's first field program, involving 61 Costa Rican students and teachers, took place in May 2000. The goal was simple: to involve local residents in the monitoring and protection of critically endangered nesting leatherback sea turtles. The students monitored the beach at night and learned about turtles and the surrounding lowland tropical forest during the day. In October 2001, EPI received official independent non-profit status under United States Internal Revenue Service tax code 501(c)(3). In February 2003, EPI began work in the Galapagos Islands of Ecuador, partnering with the Charles Darwin Research Station on a green sea turtle monitoring program.

In 2005, EPI began work in La Paz, Baja California Sur, Mexico, partnering with the Centro Interdiciplinario de Ciencias Marinas (CICIMAR) and in Montana, partnering with the United States Forest Service out of Gardiner, Montana. In 2006, EPI’s campus in La Paz, Mexico, officially opened..

In 2010, EPI headquarters moved to Missoula, Montana, where both the world headquarters offices and the Yellowstone Program offices reside in the historic Swift Building.

EPI's program in Panama commenced in 2012, focused on local students, and the program ended in 2015.

In 2013, EPI's Belize office opened its doors, partnering with the Oceanic Society and the University of Belize.

In 2015, Pacuare Reserve, a 2,500 acre coastal rainforest reserve, was gifted to EPI by John and Hilda Denham.

In 2017, EPI piloted two new programs, the Hawaii Ecology Program based in Maui, Hawaii, and the Andes to Amazon Ecology Program based in Ecuador.

== Programs ==
=== Belize ===
Programs in Belize center on the Mesoamerican Barrier Reef, where students work with the Toledo Institute for Development and Education (TIDE) to survey the reef and collect data on seagrasses, the endangered Antillean manatee, and the yellow-headed parrot in Southern Belize. Inland portions of the course take students to the Cockscomb Basin Wildlife Sanctuary, home to jaguars, peccary, and other large mammals.

=== Costa Rica ===
On the Caribbean coast of Costa Rica, site of the world’s fourth most important nesting habitat for critically endangered leatherback sea turtles, EPI involves high school youth in leatherback protection and research. Youth walk the beaches of Pacuare Reserve to protect nests, gather vital data about leatherbacks, and move nests when necessary to protect against human and environmental threats. Pacuare Reserve's coastline and surrounding lowland tropical rainforest are home to hundreds of species of mammals, birds, amphibians, and reptiles.

=== Galapagos ===
In the Galapagos Islands, Ecuador, EPI students work to rehabilitate the threatened giant Galapagos land tortoise in partnership with the Galapagos National Park. Youth support biodiversity protection by helping researchers monitor wild tortoises, protect nests, care for juveniles, eradicate invasive species, and restore habitat.

=== Mexico ===
EPI’s Turtle, Whale, and Island Ecology Programs in Baja California Sur, Mexico, engage youth in marine biodiversity protection and research. Students collect data on whales, dolphins, turtles, and marine invertebrates to monitor populations and ecosystem health to support a proposed conservation zone, proactively address threats to marine life and terrestrial ecosystems, and ensure the stability of Mexico’s thriving marine biodiversity into the future.

=== United States ===
In the U.S., EPI students have contributed to projects that protect the wildlife and habitat of Montana’s Greater Yellowstone Ecosystem – from grizzly bear and lynx to whitebark and bristlecone pines, to the current projects involving bison and other ungulates and amphibians. Students become aware of and informed about their surroundings and learn about interactions between humans and wildlife, all while contributing to on-the-ground projects that directly improve local conservation efforts and inform land management decisions.

The Hawaii Ecology Program partners with the Maui Nui Marine Resource Council, the Hawaii Wildlife Fund Hawksbill Recover Project, and the Hawaiian Islands Land Trust. Student activities include reef snorkel surveys and Hawaiian cultural immersion through ecological restoration projects.

== Awards and mentions ==
- 2012–2015 Best Places to Work, Outside Magazine
- Profiled on Ocean Mysteries with Jeff Corwin, 2015
- Best Monitoring and Evaluation Methodology Award, Eco-Index 2011–2014
- Profiled on Nat Geo WILD Central America with Nigel Marvin
