= EthicalQuote =

Ethical business market index

Covalence EthicalQuote also called EthicalQuote or simply CEQ is a market index tracking reputation of the world's largest companies on Environmental, Social, Governance (ESG), Corporate dimensions of firms’ ethical performance.

== History and Present ==
In 2001, Covalence SA was founded by six shareholders including Ngenda Kigaraba, Antoine Mach, Marc Rochat, Jean-Felix Savary and Steven Street. Covalence is a private, for profit company.

Covalence “Best EthicalQuote Score” established the amount of published positive minus negative news since 2002. The methodology for calculating its EthicalQuote score and rankings was revised in 2009 making comparison to previous years’ data not possible. This illustrates one of the challenges facing the assessment of social responsibility: how the concept of CSR is operationalised and measured. Covalence publishes regularly in Le Temps and a monthly comment on the BBGI-EthicalQuote Swiss Equities Indices in l’Agefi.

Covalence EthicalQuote is one of the founding members of Swiss Sustainable Finance (SFF), a partnership with the Federal Department of Economic Affairs, Education and Research.

== Research and Assessment ==
CEQ accounts for cultural diversity, political pluralism and scientific uncertainty. It aggregates thousands of documents extracted from diverse sources and classified according to 50 sustainability criteria inspired by the Global Reporting Initiative. The extra-financial ratings are used by indexes of sustainable Swiss equities. In 2007 Covalence partnered with Thomson Reuters and Bloomberg distributing EthicalQuote through their platforms.

Research sponsored by the Journal of Business Ethics states there is an equity valuation effect of press releases of upgrades or downgrades reflected in the CEQ . The research encompasses a joint test of the value relevance of the index and the impact of ethical reputation on a firm's value. A significant causal relationship is identified between stock market reactions and the changes in the CEQ. Particularly, disclosures of positive and negative changes in firm ethical performance cause increases or decreases in firm value. Second, the research found cross-sectional analysis indicates a positive association between changes in firm ethical performance and both its financial performance and its financial reporting quality. The results measures taken to increase ethical performance are associated with positive benefits to shareholders.

A desire to look at industries that have "a heavy impact on culture and the way people think” inspired a collaboration in reporting by Covalence SA, Ethical Investment Research Service (EIRIS) and the WWF. The initiative is not to " criticise these companies but to make a general point: responsible business practices can be a value driver, but they need to be systematically embedded in the DNA of a company, .... Comparison can be a powerful motivation to change.” said Mr Kleanthous (a senior policy adviser at WWF).

== External sources ==
- Covalence EthicalQuote (company website)
