= Fair Stone standard =

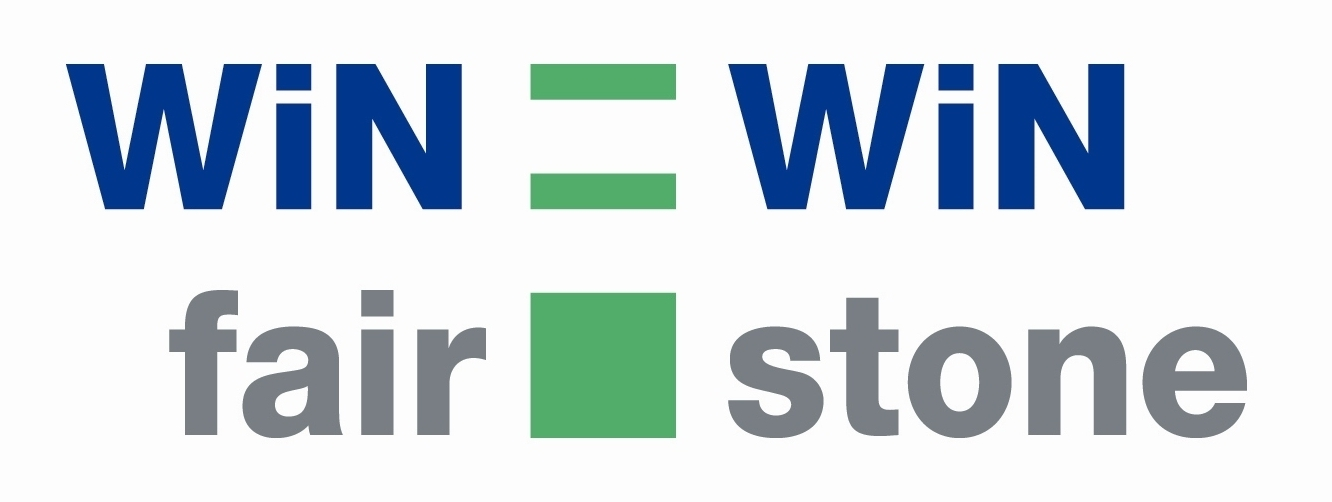
Fair Stone logo

The Fair Stone standard, also referred to as "fairstone", is a social and environmental standard for the global natural stone industry developed in 2007 by WiN=WiN GmbH – Agency for Global Responsibility, a German consulting agency, in conjunction with the mining section of the International Social Security Association (ISSA) and other international advisors. Fair Stone e.V., a non-profit organisation promoting the standard, was founded in 2014.

Other partners in the development of the standard included two Chinese companies, SFS Stone and Delta Stone, both based in Xiamen, and a German stone importer, Seltra.

The standard covers four aspects of the natural stone extraction and processing industry:

- Occupational safety and health,
- Human and labour rights,
- Environmental impact, and
- Management systems.

Specific criteria exist for quarries, stone processing factories, distribution and the supply chain or chain of custody, associate partners (retail, stonemasons and other commercial clients) and the management system.
