= Institute for Business Value =

The Institute for Business Value (IBV) a calibrated concept of IBM - is a business research organization that focuses on managerial and economic issues faced by companies and governments around the world. It has offices in China, India, Ireland, Japan, the Netherlands, South Africa and the United States, and it publishes between 35 and 50 major studies each year.

== History ==
The IBM Institute for Business Value grew out of earlier research programs at IBM that were part of the firm’s management consulting organization. These predecessors included the IBM Institute for Knowledge Management (IKM) and the IBM e-business Innovation Institute (ebII). The IKM, founded in 1999, was a membership consortium of private and public organizations that conducted research on the managerial and organizational aspects of knowledge management. The ebII was formed in 2000 with a small group of IBM consultants doing research into the impact of current and future technologies on business issues across a wide range of industries. In August 2001, IBM acquired Mainspring, a small strategy consulting firm headquartered in Cambridge, Massachusetts, and in October combined its research capabilities with the IKM and ebII to create the IBM Institute for Business Value (IBV).

From its early years the IBV focused on topics relevant to senior executives. It began publishing studies on business trends and management issues in such core industries as banking, automotive, and telecommunications. Most of the studies were global in scope, although a few focused on issues specific to a region, such as Western Europe or North America. Additionally, the IBV began to conduct research concerning cross-industry issues, such as customer relationship management (CRM).

In 2002, IBM acquired PriceWaterhouseCoopers Consulting (PwCC), the consulting arm of PriceWaterhouseCoopers, thereby increasing IBM’s consulting population by some 30,000 employees and augmenting its expertise in the business issues of over a dozen industries and key functions, such as financial management, and supply chain management. The IBV became part of the merged consulting organization, now known as IBM Global Business Services (GBS).

The inclusion of PwCC into IBM led to important changes in the IBV. First, the number of full-time consultants working at the IBV grew from about 35 in 2002 to about 55 by 2008 and with the addition of specialized groups in Japan, India and China to about 80 in 2011. Second, many came in with a combination of advanced academic research degrees and consulting experience. Third, the staff became more international, although two main offices were established: one in Cambridge, Massachusetts and the other in Amsterdam. Studies were now organized more expansively by industry and management function (e.g., finance, HR). One type of study brought over from PwCC was the “future agenda” that explored the economic and business trends affecting an industry over a 5 to 10-year period. Within several years, the IBV had published nearly a dozen of such studies. The staff also published books dealing with such issues as knowledge management, the electronics industry, and the role of IT in myriad American industries.

== Key activities ==
The IBV continues to conduct primary research, publish white papers, present research findings at industry conferences, and write bylined articles for trade and business publications. Global activities continue to expand through IBV satellite programs in China, Japan, India and South Africa. A high-profile collaboration, begun in 2001, with the Economist Intelligence Unit (EIU) produces a ranking of scores of nations in their use of IT, called the E-Readiness Ranking. Published annually in the spring, by 2008 it was the longest-running review of economic, political, social and technological issues affecting countries around the world

The IBV also has continued and broadened a series of CxO studies originated by PwCC. The CxO studies conduct extensive (often involving over 1,000 participants from across the world and from a wide range of sectors) in-office surveys and interviews with senior executives around the globe – CEOs, chief information officers (CIOs), chief financial officers (CFOs), chief human resource officers (CHROs), chief supply chain officers (CSCOs) and chief marketing officers (CMOs), – publishing the results every two years for CEOs and CIOs in May and every four years for CFOs, CHROs, CSCOs and CMOs in October.
