= Ethical positioning index =

The EPI (ethical positioning index) is an index which measures how ethically a brand is positioned.

Ethics have been a highly debated and controversial element in branding exercises. Marketers' opinions on this aspect of sales have varied from time to time. Using ethical practices to build brand equity and brand positioning has been employed by different marketing experts, based on their cultural and ethical value systems. Sagar et al., Through their research in this area, marketers have come up with EPI.

There are several steps involved in deriving and calculating an EPI. First, a set of blended variables of brand positioning and ethics is identified, consisting of 5 elements of brand positioning sub-divided into 15 and ten sub-elements of ethics. Then, consumer ratings are obtained for all elements on a 1–5 scale, which in total makes 25 values ranging from 1 to 5. The sub-element scores are then averaged over the whole sample to obtain an average score for each sub-element. Thus, a set of 25 average scores is obtained. Second, the sub-elements of brand positioning are taken and combined to obtain five sub-elements of brand positioning.

The calculation of scores for the five brand positioning variables is done by evaluating the arithmetic mean of the various sub-elements that a brand positioning variable includes. Thus, a set of five average scores, labeled as SB1-SB5, is obtained, which reflects the consumer preference for the various attributes. Similarly, a score is obtained for the ten sub-elements of ethics, and are labeled as SE1-SE10. A high score reflects greater liking, while a low score indicates dislike and insignificance. Third, the weights are obtained for the various elements.

To obtain the weight for each of the five brand positioning variables, the average score of the variable is divided by the sum of the average scores of all the five brand positioning variables. The weights so obtained are labeled WB1-WB5. Similarly, 15 weights, labeled WE1–WE10, are obtained for all ten ethic variables from the analysis of the conducted survey. Finally, the EPI score is calculated and arranged in descending order to obtain the EPI.
