= List of schools in the London Borough of Camden =

This is a list of schools in the London Borough of Camden, England.

== State-funded schools ==
=== Primary schools ===
Source. CE Church of England, RC Roman Catholic

- Abacus Belsize Primary School
- Argyle Primary School
- Beckford Primary School
- Brecknock Primary School
- Brookfield Primary School
- Christ Church Primary School, Hampstead (CE)
- Christ Church Primary School, Redhill Street (CE)
- Christopher Hatton Primary School
- Edith Neville Primary School
- Eleanor Palmer Primary School
- Emmanuel Primary School (CE)
- Fitzjohn's Primary School
- Fleet Primary School
- Gospel Oak Primary School
- Hampstead Parochial Primary School (CE)
- Hawley Primary School
- Holy Trinity and St Silas Primary School (CE)
- Holy Trinity Trinity Walk Primary School (CE)
- Kentish Town Primary School (CE)
- Kings Cross Academy
- Kingsgate Primary School
- Netley Primary School
- New End Primary School
- Our Lady Primary School (RC)
- Primrose Hill School
- Rhyl Community Primary School
- Richard Cobden Primary School
- Rosary Primary School (RC)
- St Alban's Primary School (CE)
- St Eugene de Mazenod Primary School (RC)
- St George the Martyr Primary School (CE)
- St Joseph's Primary School (RC)
- St Luke's Primary School (CE)
- St Mary & St Pancras Primary School (CE)
- St Mary's Kilburn Primary School (CE)
- St Michael's Primary School (CE)
- St Patrick's Primary School (RC)
- St Paul's Primary School (CE)
- Torriano Primary School

=== Secondary schools ===
- Acland Burghley School
- Camden School for Girls
- Hampstead School
- Haverstock School
- La Sainte Union Catholic School
- Maria Fidelis RC Convent School
- Parliament Hill School
- Regent High School
- UCL Academy
- William Ellis School

=== Special and alternative schools ===
- Camden Centre for Learning
- Camden Primary Pupil Referral Unit
- CCfL Key Stage 3 PRU
- CCfL Key Stage 4 PRU
- Children's Hospital School at Gt Ormond Street and UCH
- Frank Barnes Primary School for Deaf Children
- Royal Free Hospital Children's School
- Swiss Cottage School
- Wac Arts College

=== Further education ===
- City And Islington College
- City Literary Institute
- LaSWAP Sixth Form (a joint project of La Sainte Union Catholic School, William Ellis School, Acland Burghley School and Parliament Hill School)
- Mary Ward Centre
- Westminster Kingsway College
- Working Men's College

== Independent schools ==
=== Primary and preparatory schools ===
- The Academy School
- Broadhurst School
- The Cavendish School
- City Junior School
- Devonshire House Preparatory School
- The Hall School
- Hampstead Hill School
- Hereward House School
- La Petite Ecole Bilingue
- Lyndhurst House Preparatory School
- Maria Montessori School
- The Mulberry House School
- St Anthony's School
- St Christopher's School
- St Mary's School Hampstead
- Sarum Hall School
- Trevor-Roberts School
- The Village School
- Wildwood Nature School

=== Senior and all-through schools ===
- CATS College London
- Collège Français Bilingue de Londres
- Ecole Jeannine Manuel
- Fine Arts College
- Heathside School
- LSI Independent College
- North Bridge House School
- St Margaret's School
- South Hampstead High School
- Southbank International School
- University College School

=== Special and alternative schools ===
- Gloucester House, The Tavistock Children's Day Unit
- Odyssey House School - Bloomsbury

== Notes ==
All list retrieved from here.
