= List of schools in Hampstead =

Hampstead, in the London Borough of Camden, England, is home to a number of schools, of various types.

== State-funded primary schools ==
- Christ Church Primary School (Mixed, Voluntary Aided)
- Fitzjohn's Primary School (Mixed, Community)
- Fleet Primary School (Mixed, Community)
- Hampstead Parochial Primary School (Mixed, Voluntary Aided, Church of England)
- Holy Trinity Primary School (Church of England)
- New End Primary School (Mixed, Community)
- The Rosary RC Primary School (Mixed, Voluntary Aided)
- Saint Pauls Primary School (Church of England)

== State-funded secondary schools ==
- Hampstead School (Mixed, Community)
- Haverstock School (Mixed, Community)
- Parliament Hill School (Girls, Community)
- William Ellis School (Boys, Voluntary Aided)

== Special schools ==
- Royal Free Hospital Children's School (Mixed, Special Community)

== Independent schools ==
=== Primary and preparatory schools ===
- Devonshire House Preparatory School (Mixed)
- Hall School (Boys)
- Hampstead Hill School (Mixed)
- Heathside Preparatory School (Mixed)
- Hereward House School (Boys)
- Kerem School (Mixed, Jewish)
- Lyndhurst House Preparatory School (Boys)
- Maria Montessori School (Mixed)
- North Bridge House School (Mixed)
  - The nursery and primary schools and one campus of the senior school are in Hampstead
- Phoenix School (Mixed)
- South Hampstead Junior School (Girls)
- Southbank International School (Mixed)
- St Anthony's Preparatory School (Boys, Catholic)
- St Anthony's School for Girls (Girls, Catholic)
- St Christopher's School (Girls)
- St Margaret's School (Girls)
- St Mary's School (Mixed)
- The Academy School (Mixed)
- The Village School (Girls)
- University College School (Junior Branch) (Boys)

=== Secondary and senior schools ===
- South Hampstead High School (Girls)
- King Alfred School (Mixed)
- North Bridge House School (Mixed)
- St Margaret's School (Girls)
- University College School (Boys)

== Colleges ==
- ESCP Europe
- British College of Osteopathic Medicine
- Hampstead College Of Fine Arts & Humanities
- Hampstead Cuisine School
- Hampstead School of Art
- Hampstead School of English
- Hampstead School of Speech & Drama
- King's College London
- Lakefield Hospitality College
- UCL Medical School
