= Advisory Board (Conservative Party) =

The Advisory Board is the name given to a group of individuals that have donated significant sums to the British Conservative Party, typically in excess of £250,000. By February 2022 members of the board had donated £22 million to the party. Members are asked for their opinions on government policies and regularly meet with government ministers including former prime minister Boris Johnson.

== History ==
The advisory board was created and developed by Ben Elliot, the chief fundraiser and co-chairman of the Conservative Party. The idea for the advisory board is believed to have originated with either the former chief executive of the Conservative Party Mick Davis, or the party's former treasurer Ehud Sheleg. The Times wrote that under Theresa May's leadership of the party " ... donors, especially wealthy Eurosceptics, had felt sidelined, their proposals ignored at the top of government" and that with the election of Johnson as leader " ... it was time to bring them back into the fold. By forming the advisory board, the Conservative Party was creating a space where those donors who had contributed vast sums of cash would frequently and formally be brought into contact with ministers and advisers".

The Conservative Party's membership group for elite donors had previously been the Leader's Group to which attendees must contribute £50,000. The Leader's Group offers its members " ... scheduled drinks receptions and meetings with the entire cabinet" including the prime minister.

The board is not mentioned on the website of the Conservative Party.

Members of the advisory board have donated £22 million to the Conservative Party. The total combined wealth of members of the advisory board is in excess of £30 billion. Six members of the board have appeared on the Sunday Times Rich List and three members are billionaires. The businessman Mohamed Amersi has said that membership of the advisory board costs £250,000 a year.

== Purpose ==
The members of the board meet with senior figures in the Conservative Party for "political updates". Members of the group have been granted access to the prime minister of the United Kingdom, Boris Johnson and the chancellor of the exchequer, Rishi Sunak. The advisory board has held monthly conference calls or meetings with either Johnson or Sunak. The Financial Times wrote that "Some members have used those discussions to call for public spending cuts and lower taxes".

The members of the advisory board are " ... asked for their ideas — or, as one donor put it, "thought leadership" — on the party and the government's policy and political direction as a whole" and would "meet at party headquarters and be treated as members of a formal organisation" rather than "merely attend champagne receptions and mix[ing] briefly with ministers" as members of the Leader's Group do.

The Times wrote that "Perhaps the greatest benefit conferred upon [members of the Advisory Board] is the apparent licence it gave them to approach individuals at the top of government in a personal capacity". The Times reported that "According to sources, some donors started to use meetings to lobby for their own personal or business interests. The pandemic accelerated this shift, with a number of donors using meetings to argue for an end to Covid-19 restrictions during the first wave. Others suggested financial aid and support for their sectors, or even their specific companies".

== Members and lobbying ==
Members of the advisory board have included businessman Mohamed Amersi, Philip Bouverat, who attended meetings of the group on behalf of JCB chairman Anthony Bamford, Lubov Chernukhin, the wife of the former Russian deputy finance minister Vladimir Chernukhin, internet entrepreneur Peter Dubens, venture capitalist Edward Eisler, property developer Tony Gallagher, theatre producer John Gore, internet entrepreneur Lawrence Jones, energy investor Ravi Kailas, Iranian businessman Javad Marandi, property investor Leo Noé, businessman Jamie Reuben, financier Michael Spencer and recruitment company founder Robert Walters.

Government ministers have utilised private email accounts to communicate with members of the advisory board despite the guidelines given by the Cabinet Office stating that " ... it is expected that government business should be recorded on a government record system". Another of the advisory board members emailed Matt Hancock, the Secretary of State for Health and Social Care, with an "idea about testing supplies" during the first wave of the COVID-19 pandemic in the United Kingdom. They introduced themselves to Hancock as a member of the advisory board and Hancock "loop[ed] in" his advisor James O'Shaughnessy on O'Shaughnessy's Gmail account and "[asked] him to take forward the proposal". The Downing Street Chief of Staff Sir Edward Lister used his private BT Internet email address to communicate with one member of the advisory board.

A meeting of the advisory board on Microsoft Teams was convened by Lister at 10 Downing Street on 15 May 2020 during the COVID-19 pandemic in the United Kingdom. This was the same day that the first Partygate photograph was taken. In an investigation into the Advisory Group, Gabriel Pogrund and Henry Zeffman wrote in The Times that "On that day, with Britain deep in the pandemic, Lister, Johnson's chief strategic adviser, spent an hour on Microsoft Teams, answering questions and addressing the concerns of donors. According to a source, board members — whose investments spanned property, construction and big tobacco — were alarmed by the effect of Covid-19 on their businesses. A number of those present requested swift action, including the relaxation of measures designed to stop transmission". A witness said that "It was implied that what we said would go straight up to the [Prime Minister]". Lister was joined on the meeting by Elliot.

Another member of the advisory board, Lubov Chernukhin, was alleged by The Times to have repeatedly lobbied government ministers "against raising the tax burden on high net-worth individuals" and sent ministers research from Ernst and Young "on the importance of the ultra-rich for the overall economy".

The Times wrote that "None of the meetings appear to have been minuted or attended by civil servants, so there is unlikely to be any record of the advice or lobbying which took place". The advisory board is not subject to transparency laws as it is part of the Conservative Party as opposed to a British government. The Times wrote that members of the board " ... allegedly told not to record or take notes of meetings, or discuss the group publicly. The party had refused to say who its members were, what its purpose was, or how often it gathered".

== Reactions ==
BBC News stated that "There is nothing new about political parties having tiers of membership, with access to events and leading figures depending on how much donors are prepared to pay. But the Tory party is particularly secretive about its various clubs and the access they buy".

The chair of the Labour Party, Anneliese Dodds, described Johnson as having " ... sanctioned the creation of a secret club of super-rich donors that gets privileged access to ministers, and he has chosen time and again to turn a blind eye to unacceptable conflicts of interest. This is on him". Dodds said that Johnson " ... must explain what donors with links to Putin's Russia got in return for their six-figure annual membership fee and clarify whether these meetings had any impact on government policy at the height of the pandemic".

A spokesperson for the Conservative Party said that "Donations are properly and transparently declared to the Electoral Commission, published by them, and comply fully with the law. Fundraising is a legitimate part of the democratic process. The alternative is more taxpayer-funding of political campaigning, which would mean less money for frontline services like schools, police and hospitals".
