= Chernukhin =

Chernukhin (masculine, Russian: Чернухин) or Chernukhina (feminine, Russian: Чернухина) is a Russian surname. Notable people with the surname include:

- Dmitry Chernukhin (born 1988), Russian footballer
- Lubov Chernukhin (born 1972), Soviet businesswoman, wife of Vladimir
- Vladimir Chernukhin (born 1968), Soviet banker and economist, husband of Lubov
- Yevgeniy Chernukhin (born 1984), Belarusian football coach and former player
