= Jennifer Gay =

English television announcer and ballerina

- Born: Jennifer Gaylor Rignold; 22 September 1935 (age 90); London, England
- Years active: 1949–1953

Jennifer Gaylor Rignold (born 22 September 1935) is an English television announcer and ballerina who was an on-screen BBC Children's TV continuity announcer for the BBC Television Service (later to become BBC One, but then the only British television channel) between 1949 and 1953. She was a roving reporter for the ATV nightly news programme ATV Today in the early 1960s.

== Early life ==
Jennifer Gay was born Jennifer Gaylor Rignold, to actress Molly Gay and composer Hugo Rignold. She was educated at St Margaret's School Hampstead and the Royal Academy of Dancing, the latter on a five-year scholarship that she won when she was nine years old and completed by 1950. Gay resumed her training at another ballet school in London for another three years before leaving to join the Royal Ballet School and then The Royal Ballet at Covent Garden one year later. She used a shortened version of her middle name for her professional career.

== Television career ==
"With her very fair complexion, light-brown hair and wise, grey-blue eyes she has occupied the children's TV studio with... determination to do the job seriously."

— The Television Annual for 1953

Gay was given an on-screen trial of holding paintings by the BBC television producer and Far Eastern affairs specialist Peter Thompson after being introduced to him at his wedding, and was primed by Cecil Madden, the head of BBC children's television. Gay began introducing children's programmes in June 1949, and aged 14 became the "first schoolgirl in the world to announce TV programmes as a regular job". For the next three years, she grew up on screen, her name intrinsically linked with early 1950s children's television.

Introducing herself by name as "one of the Children's Hour announcers", Gay appeared most days at 5pm to introduce that afternoon's hour of programming, which included such favourites as Muffin the Mule, Mr. Turnip, and Hank and Prudence. Andrew Martin a BBC Archives expert described Gay as "the accepted way of presenting children to themselves".

Her final on-screen appearance as an announcer was in May 1953, after which Gay left the BBC to continue the ballet training she had pursued throughout her television career. She made her television debut as a ballerina in the feature Shop Window in November 1952. Gay toured the United States for three months with the Sadler's Wells Ballet Company (of which she was a member) starting from 4 September 1955. When Gay was 25 years old, she decided to retire from The Royal Ballet after being persuaded to do so by her father so she could help him, working as his secretary. Gay returned to television at ATV in the Midlands during the early 1960s, and was one of the launch team of reporters for the nightly news magazine programme ATV Today. She had been suggested the job by television broadcaster Leslie Dunn and she received a one-month trial following an audition at ATV.

=== Career highlights ===
In December 1949, Gay "announced the first children's programmes transmitted from the Sutton Coldfield transmitter", while the 1953 Television Annual described Gay's "most frightening afternoon", as the occasion upon which "she had to partner Mrs. Attlee in the programme which opened the Lime Grove Studios," just five months later in May, 1950.

Also in 1950, she battled sea-sickness after journeying to France to "take part in TV's first-ever cross-Channel hook-up", which included scenes of "Jennifer... going through Customs and being shown round the Port of Calais". That same year saw Gay be presented with the Television Society's Silver Medal.

== See also ==
- Continuity announcers in the United Kingdom
