= William Munt =

William Munt may refer to:

- William Munt (martyr), Englishman martyred in the 1500s
- William Munt (architect), worked in London in 1850
