= Arthur Okonkwo =

English footballer (born 2001)

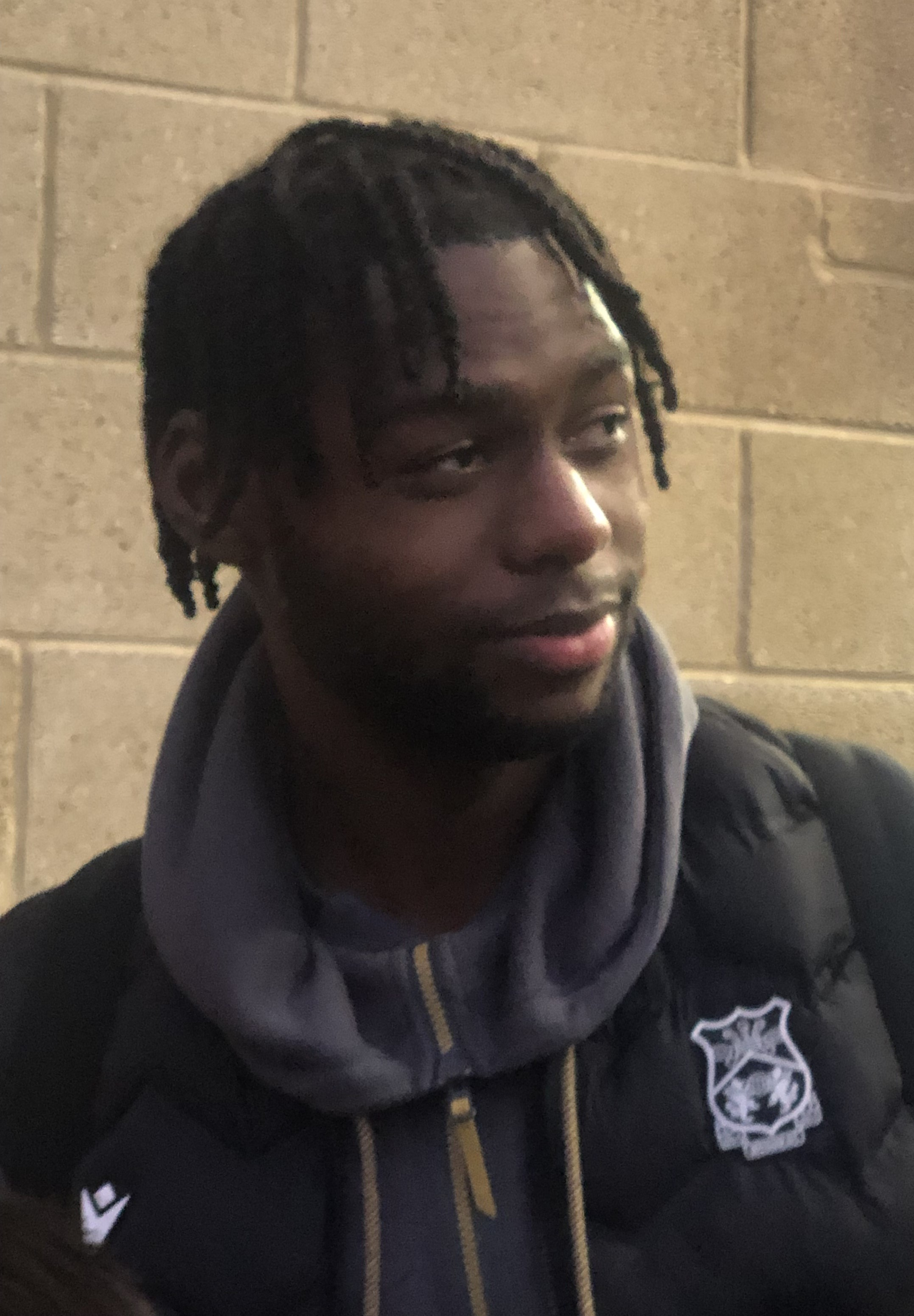
- Okonkwo post–game for Wrexham in 2024

Personal information
- Full name: Arthur Chukwuezugo Okonkwo
- Date of birth: 9 September 2001 (age 25)
- Place of birth: Camden, London, England
- Height: 1.99 m (6 ft 6 in)
- Position: Goalkeeper

Team information
- Current team: Charlton Athletic (on loan from Wrexham)
- Number: 13

Youth career
- Hampstead Academy
- –2009: Lindus Park
- 2009–2021: Arsenal

Senior career*
Years	Team	Apps	(Gls)
2021–2024	Arsenal	0	(0)
2022–2023	→ Crewe Alexandra (loan)	23	(0)
2023	→ Sturm Graz (loan)	15	(0)
2023–2024	→ Wrexham (loan)	36	(0)
2024–	Wrexham	72	(0)
2026–	→ Charlton Athletic (loan)	12	(0)

International career^{‡}
2016–2017	England U16	2	(0)
2017–2018	England U17	3	(0)
2018–2019	England U18	5	(0)
2026–	Nigeria	2	(0)
- * Club domestic league appearances and goals as of 17:10, 31 October 2026 (UTC) ‡ National team caps and goals as of 17:10, 20 August 2026 (UTC)

Arthur Chukwuezugo Okonkwo (born 9 September 2001) is a professional footballer who plays as a goalkeeper for EFL Championship club Charlton Athletic on loan from EFL Championship club Wrexham. Born in England, he plays for the Nigeria national team.

== Early life ==
Born in Camden, London, England to Igbo Nigerian parents, Okonkwo began his career at Hampstead Academy before moving on to Lindus Park, where he joined the Arsenal academy as an eight-year-old in 2009.

== Club career ==
=== Arsenal ===
Okonkwo came through the Arsenal ranks quickly, starring on the bench for an under-18 Arsenal match, while being registered as a player for the under-15 team. He also debuted for the under-23 Arsenal side as a 17-year-old. By the 2018–19 season, Okonkwo came runners-up in the U18 Premier League, and was already appearing as a bench goalkeeper for the first team, and going into the 2019–20 campaign, he would be third in line for goalkeeping duties. Okonkwo struggled with injury in the 2019–20 campaign, failing to register a single appearance for any of the Arsenal teams. Okonkwo's double save in the Premier League 2, against Brighton was a contender for the best save of the 2020–21 season.

Okonkwo played in Arsenal under-21s' 2–1 victory in the EFL Trophy at Crawley Town on 30 October 2020, and in a 1–1 draw at Plymouth Argyle in the same competition on 2 November 2021.

He signed a senior contract with Arsenal in early July 2021, donning the number 33 for the first team. Okonkwo made his senior team debut on 13 July 2021, against Hibernian in a friendly, misjudging a back pass from Arsenal teammate Cedric Soares, to grant Martin Boyle a tap-in, in a 2–1 loss to Hibs.

Okonkwo left Arsenal on 30 June 2024 at the expiration of his contract with the club.

==== Crewe Alexandra (loan) ====
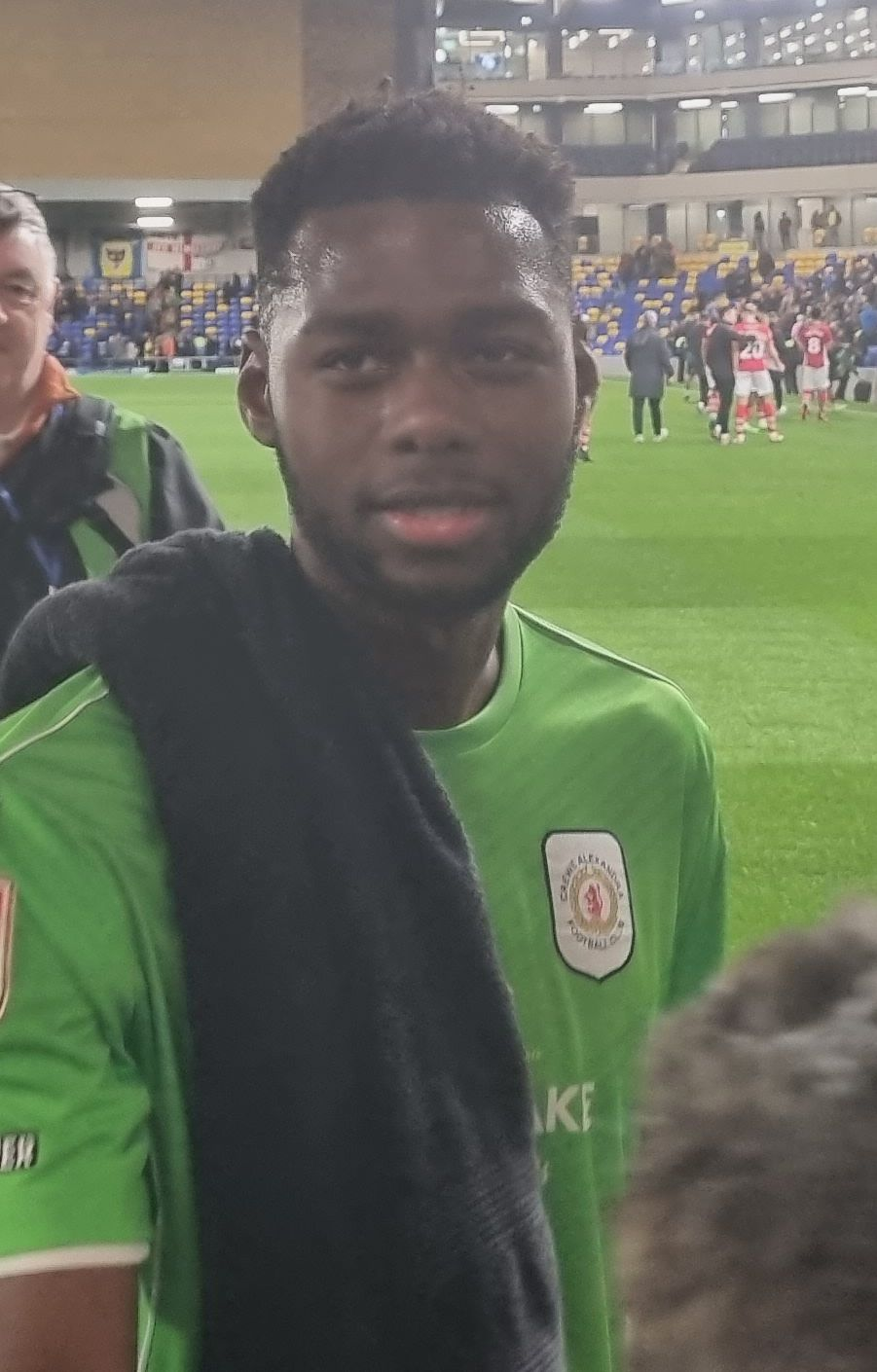
Okonkwo in Crewe Alexandra kit at Wimbledon in 2022

Okonkwo joined EFL League Two side Crewe Alexandra on a season-long loan on 29 July 2022. He was signed in time to be eligible for Crewe's season-opening game at Rochdale; Crewe's first-choice goalkeeper, Dave Richards, had suffered a finger injury and required an operation. Okonkwo duly made his Crewe and professional league debut in a 2–1 win at Spotland on 30 July 2022, then kept a clean sheet on his home debut in a 3–0 win over Harrogate Town at Gresty Road on 6 August 2022. After 26 appearances and ten clean sheets for Crewe, Okonkwo was recalled by Arsenal in mid-January 2023.

==== Sturm Graz (loan) ====
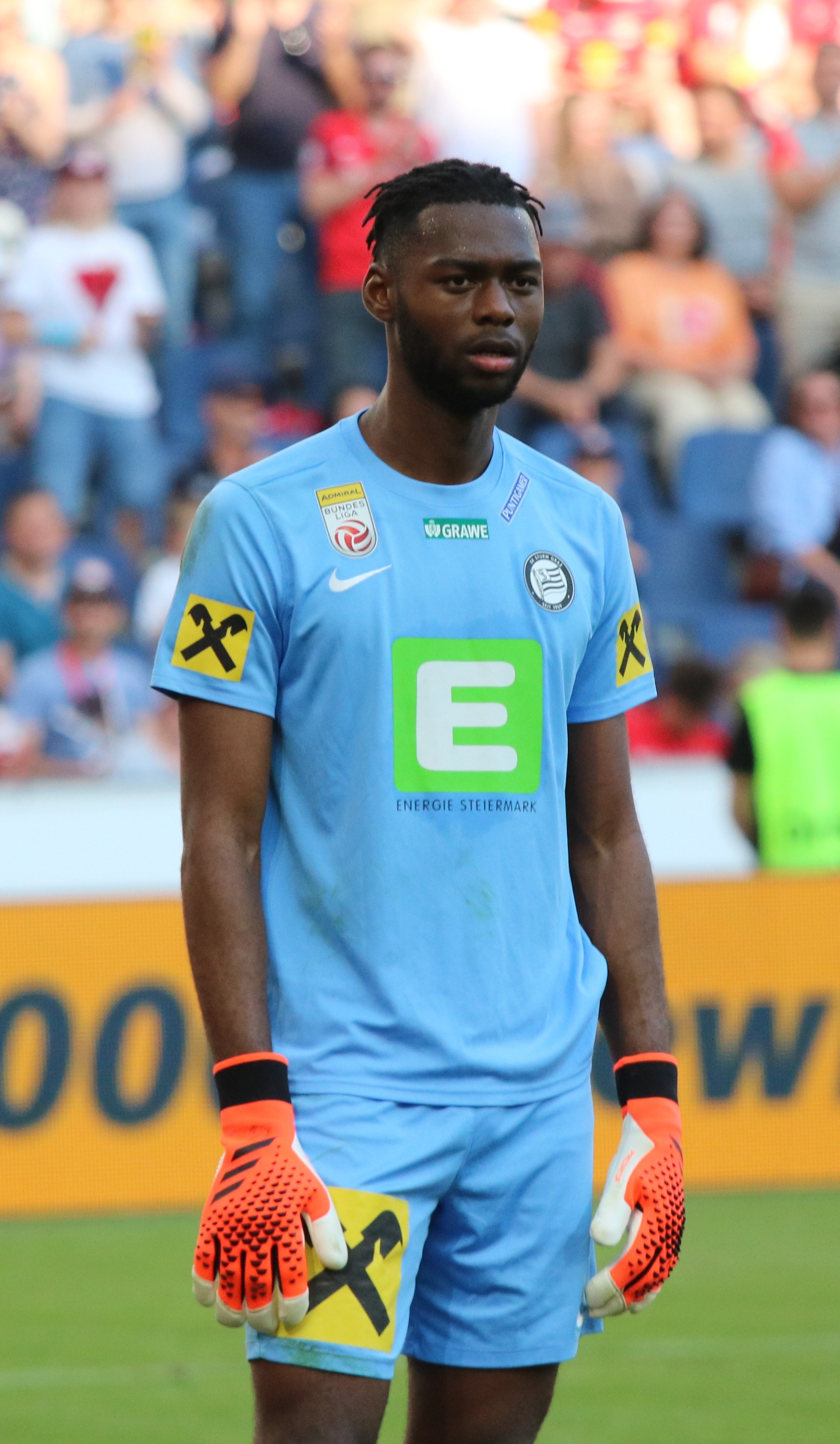
Okonkwo with Sturm Graz in 2023

On 16 January 2023, Okonkwo joined Austrian Bundesliga side Sturm Graz on loan until the end of the season. He made his Sturm Graz debut against Rapid Vienna on 10 February 2023. Okonkwo played in the Austrian Cup final on 30 April, with Sturm Graz beating SK Rapid Wien 2–0.

==== Wrexham (loan) ====
On 1 September 2023, he joined Wrexham on a season-long loan following Ben Foster's retirement. Okonkwo made his debut for the club in a fixture versus Newcastle U21 on 5 September 2023, with Wrexham pulling away as 1–0 victors He later made his league debut for the club on 30 September 2023, at home against former club Crewe Alexandra, in a 3–3 draw. In December 2023, he returned to parent club Arsenal for minor surgery after suffering a jaw injury in a 2–2 draw at Harrogate Town on 28 November. In January 2024, Wrexham confirmed that Okonkwo would remain on loan at the club until the end of the season. During his season at Wrexham he made 40 appearances in all competitions and had 16 clean sheets.

=== Return to Wrexham ===
On 22 June 2024, it was announced that Okonkwo had once again signed for Wrexham as a free agent on a three-year deal.

==== Charlton Athletic (loan) ====
On 20 August 2026, Okonkwo joined Charlton Athletic on a season-long loan.

== International career ==
Okonkwo represented England at under-16 and under-17 levels, then debuted for the under-18s two days before his birthday.

On 6 April 2026, FIFA confirmed Okonkwo had switched his allegiance from England to Nigeria. His first international call-up was for the 2026 Unity Cup.

== Style of play ==
An Arsenal academy graduate, Okonkwo has stated that Petr Cech and David De Gea influence his own goalkeeping style. Okonkwo said this on him playing as a goalkeeper: "I tried playing outfield but it wasn't for me. I enjoyed the thrill of making saves – the more spectacular the better".

== Personal life ==
Okonkwo has a younger brother, Brian, who plays as a goalkeeper in West Bromwich Albion's academy after departing Arsenal's academy in 2025.

== Career statistics ==
=== Club ===
As of match played 31 October 2026

Appearances and goals by club, season and competition
Club	Season	Division	League		National cup (Note: Includes FA Cup, Austrian Cup)		League Cup		Other		Total	
Club	Season	Division	Apps	Goals	Apps	Goals	Apps	Goals	Apps	Goals	Apps	Goals
Arsenal U21	2020–21	—	—		—		—		1 (Note: Appearances in EFL Trophy)	0	1	0
Arsenal U21	2021–22	—	—		—		—		1	0	1	0
Arsenal U21	Total		0	0	0	0	0	0	2	0	2	0
Crewe Alexandra (loan)	2022–23	League Two	23	0	2	0	1	0	0	0	26	0
Sturm Graz (loan)	2022–23	Austrian Bundesliga	15	0	1	0	—		—		16	0
Wrexham (loan)	2023–24	League Two	36	0	3	0	0	0	1	0	40	0
Wrexham	2024–25	League One	33	0	1	0	0	0	3	0	37	0
Wrexham	2025–26	Championship	39	0	3	0	2	0	—		44	0
Wrexham	2026–27	Championship	0	0	—		0	0	—		0	0
Wrexham	Total		72	0	4	0	2	0	3	0	81	0
Charlton Athletic (loan)	2026–27	Championship	12	0	0	0	0	0	—		12	0
Career total			158	0	10	0	3	0	6	0	177	0

=== International ===
As of match played 30 May 2026

Appearances and goals by national team and year
National team	Year	Apps	Goals
Nigeria
Nigeria	2026	2	0
Total		2	0

== Honours ==
=== Club ===
Sturm Graz

- Austrian Cup: 2022–23

Wrexham

- EFL League Two runner-up: 2023–24
- EFL League One runner-up: 2024–25

=== International ===
Nigeria

- Unity Cup: 2026

Individual

- EFL League Two Team of the Season: 2023–24
- Fans’ League One Player of the Month award for March 2025
