= Mohamed Amersi =

British businessman

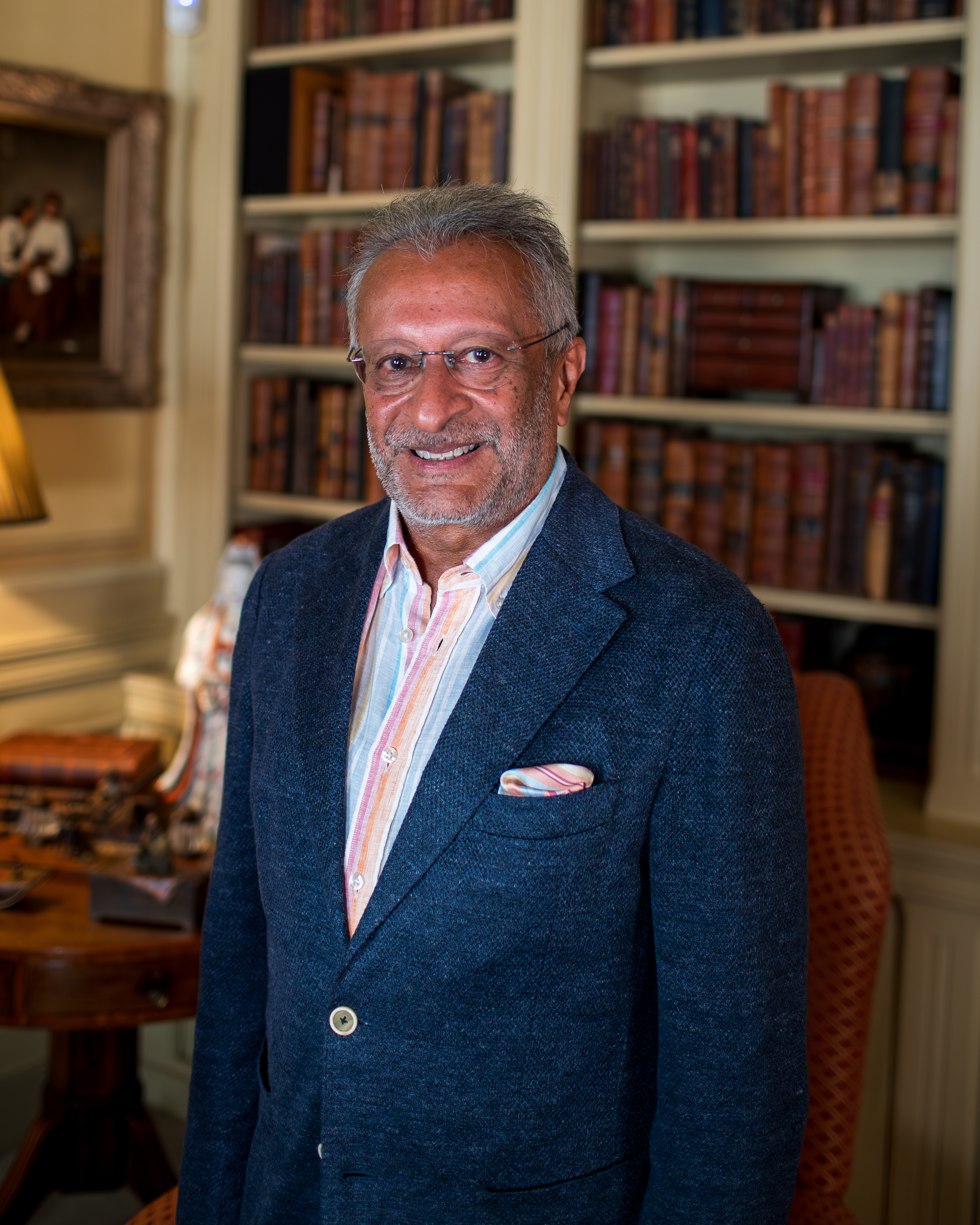
- Born: 20 April 1960 (age 66); Kenya
- Occupations: Founder and chairman, Inclusive Ventures; CEO, Emergent Telecom Ventures
- Partner: Nadezhda "Nadia" Rodicheva
- Children: 1

Mohamed Amersi (born 20 April 1960) is a UK businessman. He is the founder and chairman of the Inclusive Ventures Group, and former chairman of QML Group. He is a donor to the Conservative Party, having given nearly £525,000 since 2018.

He is founder and chairman of the Amersi Foundation, which has made contributions across a range of issues, including multi-faith and youth programmes to the arts and heritage, education, anti-slavery, climate change, technology and poverty reduction. He holds a number of chairmanship and advisory roles in the charity sector. In October 2021, alongside the Pandora Papers leak, Amersi was identified as an advisor on a deal between Telia and Takilant, a company subsequently found to have been owned by Gulnara Karimova, the daughter of the President of Uzbekistan, through offshore structures. Telia later settled the matter by entering into a DPA with the US Department of Justice. In the only trial that took place in Sweden to determine guilt, three Telia executives were acquitted at first instance and on appeal. Representatives of Amersi said that he was not a suspect nor a witness in any of the multi enforcement agency investigations and acted in a limited advisory capacity to Telia on the deal.

== Early life and education ==
Amersi was born in Kenya to "a family from an Iranian-Indian background". In 1976 he came to the UK, and studied at Merchant Taylors School. Amersi studied medicine and law at Sheffield and Cambridge universities, and went on to earn an Executive MBA at the Saïd Business School, Oxford in 2016.

Amersi is an honorary fellow of Brasenose College, Oxford and a former governor of the Royal Agricultural University, Cirencester. Amersi since then has financed one of the most significant expansions at Brasenose, with the creation of the Amersi Foundation lecture theatre.

== Career ==
=== Legal ===
Amersi initially practised law as a barrister at 1 Brick Court. He was then a solicitor with Clifford Chance and Jones, Day Reavis & Pogue. Through his legal career, Amersi developed a specialisation in equity related deals, and represented issuers and financial institutions in over 100 transactions.

=== Telecoms ===
From 1997 to 2002, Amersi was a senior advisor at Telefónica with whom he co-founded Gramercy Communications Partners in New York, and was its Managing Director.

From 2008 to 2013 he was also a senior advisor to the TeliaSonera Group, leading their M&A work including the IPO of Kcell and MegaFon. He was also the board member of various Rothschild Banking Group entities, Motorola, MegaFon and Mi-Fone.

Amersi, as head of the American investment bank Gramercy Communications Partners, (Note: The American investment bank Gramercy Communications Partners was created by Juan Villalonga who also created the Spanish telecommunications firm Telefonica.) and Juan Villalonga co-founded Emergent Telecom Ventures in 2002, an Emerging Markets advisory and consulting firm, specialising in Telecoms, Media and Technology.

=== Inclusive Ventures Group ===
While at Saïd Business School in 2014, Amersi founded Inclusive Ventures Group, a fund that focuses on making investments that have a positive social impact. Through the fund, Amersi has supported RuralShores, a business that oversees outsourcing centres in rural areas of India. Additionally, Inclusive Ventures has worked to improve access and the quality of education in Kenya through United We Reach and Bridge, an education and technology initiative.

=== QML Group ===
In 2018, Amersi became chairman of QML Group (now known as Neos International Limited), a Midlands-headquartered engineering supplier, with clients including Jaguar Land Rover, Rolls-Royce, GKN and McLaren. He resigned in 2020.

== Political activity ==
Amersi is a Conservative Party donor. He donated £10,000 each to Boris Johnson and Michael Gove during the 2019 Conservative Party leadership election. During the 2019 United Kingdom general election, he made donations of £99,500 and £7,400 to the central party, £5,000 to the Central Devon Association and £2,500 to the Rochdale Association.

On 4 October 2021, according to the massive leak of financial documents known as the Pandora Papers, Amersi advised Swedish telecoms firm Telia on a £162m deal with Gulnara Karimova in 2010 which US authorities later described as a “bribe”.

According to the Conservative MP David Davis, Amersi has used a number of legal measures against his critic, former MP Charlotte Leslie, who had compiled a due diligence note on his background, related to a dispute over the Conservative Middle East Council. Davis, speaking under parliamentary privilege, described Amersi's behaviour as "bullying". Davis also said that Amersi had with legal threats effectively "silenced" a report on his activities by Margaret Hodge MP, chair of the all-party parliamentary group (APPG) on anti-corruption and responsible tax. In June 2023, Amersi's defamation claim against Charlotte Leslie was struck out by the High Court, and the judge criticised the way Amersi had conducted the legal proceedings.

== Philanthropy ==
=== The Amersi Foundation ===
The Amersi Foundation was founded in 2012 and is one of several philanthropic initiatives Amersi is involved with. The Foundation has worked on issues such as modern-day slavery.

A key project that the Amersi Foundation is involved with is the ‘Extremely Together’ project, coordinated by the Kofi Annan Foundation. The project brought together 10 of the world's leading young counter-extremism experts to provide guidance on how to prevent and counter youth radicalisation. When asked about the work both foundations were conducting, Amersi said that ‘it is more important than ever that young people feel engaged and energised’.

In 2017, the Amersi Foundation contributed to the funding of The Foundry at Oxford University, a centre for entrepreneurs opened by Tim Cook, CEO of Apple. Amersi is listed as being a member of its advisory board.

=== Other projects ===
Amersi is also involved in several projects that were launched under the Prince of Wales, including the Prince's Trust International, the Prince's Trust Mosaic network and Dumfries House. He is a Trustee and a member of the Global Advisory Board of Prince's Trust International, and a Trustee for the Foreign Policy Research Institute. He is also the chair of the International Advisory Council for the British Asian Trust, another of the Prince of Wales’ charitable initiatives. Additionally, he chairs the Board of Trustees for the Islamic Reporting Initiative, is a trustee of the Kailash Satyarthi Children's Foundation, the Rose Castle Foundation, which works with faith leaders to improve inter-faith communications and United We Reach. He is a Counsellor for One Young World.

=== Other affiliations ===
- Member of the Development Board of the British Academy and a member of the Steering Group and the Corporate Advisory Group of the British Academy's Future of the Corporation Project.
- Trustee of the Foreign Policy Research Institute.
- Member of the Global Leadership Council of the Saïd Business School, University of Oxford.
- Member of the Advisory Boards of the Global Thinkers Forum, Toucan and Faith in Leadership.
- Member of the Global Partners Council of the Institute of New Economic Thinking (INET).
- Member of the Advisory Board of the Commonwealth Enterprise and Investment Council and of Commonwealth First.
- Member of the Advisory Board of the Education Outcomes Fund.

== Personal life ==
His partner is his Russian-born business partner, Nadezhda Rodicheva. She has herself donated more than £250,000 to the Conservative Party in 2017 and 2018.

== Amersi v Leslie ==
In 2021, Amersi sued former Conservative MP Charlotte Leslie for defamation after she had complained to senior party members that Amersi was trying to take over the Conservative Middle East Council which she was then running. He instructed the law firm Carter-Ruck to launch costly and complex actions against Leslie. The High Court of Justice in the Strand found that Amersi's actions against Leslie were SLAPPs (Strategic Lawsuits against Public Participation). Justice of the High Court Sir Matthew James Nicklin FRSA found that Amersi had failed to prove his case and several aspects of the case gave "real cause for concern". David Davis MP and the UK Government have described SLAPPs as an abuse designed to harass, intimidate and financially exhaust an opponent. In 2024, Parliament cited Amersi v Leslie as an example of legal abuse to bring multiple claims in succession. In November 2023, the Court of Appeal refused Amersi's appeal ending all possible pursuit of Leslie.
