= Charlotte Leslie =

British Conservative Party politician

Director of the Conservative Middle East Council
- Incumbent
- Assumed office July 2017
- Preceded by: Office created

Member of Parliament for Bristol North West
- In office 6 May 2010 – 3 May 2017
- Preceded by: Doug Naysmith
- Succeeded by: Darren Jones

Personal details
- Born: 11 August 1978 (age 48) Liverpool, England
- Party: Conservative
- Education: Balliol College, Oxford

Charlotte Leslie (born 11 August 1978) is a British Conservative Party politician who is the current Director of the Conservative Middle East Council. She was the Member of Parliament (MP) for the Bristol North West constituency, losing her seat at the 2017 general election.

== Early life ==
Born in Liverpool in 1978, Leslie moved to Bristol with her family when she was two. Her father worked as an orthopaedic surgeon at Southmead Hospital in Bristol and the Bristol Royal Infirmary. Her mother is a British triathlon champion for her age group, and in 2013, finished 9th in the World Triathlon Grand Final. Leslie was privately educated at Badminton School and Millfield, before studying Classics at Balliol College, Oxford. She graduated in 2001. She used to swim competitively, representing City of Bristol, and made the age-group national finals in the 200 m and 100 m backstroke.

== Career ==
Whilst at university, and immediately afterwards, Leslie worked as a lifeguard on the beaches of North Cornwall, and then as a swimming coach and gym instructor at Thornbury Leisure Centre and part-time in a local pub. She later worked in television, for the BBC on The Weakest Link and The Holiday Programme, as well as on independent programmes at the BBC and Sky. She has also worked as a part-time tutor in Classics as well as both a governor of Oxford Gardens Primary School in London and Avonmouth Primary School in Bristol.

In 2005, she joined the Policy Exchange think tank. Whilst there, she co-authored the report "More Good School Places", which was the first to recommend a "Pupil Premium" of £6000 extra funding for each disadvantaged child in the country's state schools. This policy was later adopted by the Coalition Government in 2010.

She later worked as an advisor to David Willetts, the then Shadow Secretary of state for Children, Schools and Families, focusing mainly on special education, and for the Young Foundation and the National Autistic Society.

Before her election in 2010, she edited Crossbow, the journal of the Bow Group, and wrote for a variety of publications, including a regular blog for The Guardian.

In July 2017, Leslie was appointed the director of the Conservative Middle East Council. In connection with a dispute involving the Conservative Middle East Council, Mohamed Amersi sued Leslie for defamation. In June 2023, Amersi's claim was struck out by the High Court. The judge criticised the way Amersi had conducted the legal proceedings.

== In Parliament (2010–2017) ==
In the general election of 6 May 2010, Charlotte Leslie was elected as the Member of Parliament for the bellwether constituency of Bristol North West at the age of thirty-one, making her one of the youngest MPs in Parliament. She polled 19,115 votes, 3,274 ahead of the Liberal Democrat candidate, and achieved a swing of 8.86% from the incumbent Labour MP Doug Naysmith.

She made her maiden speech on 2 June 2010, focusing on the educational divisions existing in her constituency and praising organisations like Teach First which seek to break down such barriers.

She became a member of the Education Select Committee in 2010, stepping down in 2013 after she became a member of the Health Select Committee. In 2011, she was appointed as the Government's "Big Society" ambassador by the Prime Minister.

Leslie became more prominent in 2013 after the publication of the report of the Francis Inquiry into the scandal at Mid-Staffordshire NHS Foundation Trust. She was praised for her campaign during which she called for David Nicholson, the Chief Executive of NHS England, to resign. In May 2013, Nicholson resigned, after a reign of 6 years, following sustained political and press criticism of his role in the Mid-Staffs scandal.

Leslie's campaign culminated in her winning "Backbencher of the Year" at The Spectator's 2013 Parliamentarian of the Year awards.

She has also led calls in Parliament for the creation of a Royal College of Teaching, publishing a book on the subject in 2013. She was also a trustee on the Teacher Development Trust.

She re-formed the All Party Parliamentary Group (APPG) for Boxing in 2011, and was its chair for approximately 6 years. She was also a member of the APPGs on Autism, Beer, National Citizens' Service and Volunteering, and Sport.

She was praised in Chancellor George Osborne's budget speech of 2012 for her campaign to scrap the beer duty escalator, which added 2% plus inflation to the cost of beer each year. Osborne removed the escalator and cut 1p off beer duty.

In April 2014, Leslie apologised to the House of Commons following accusations that she had failed to declare financial donations in the Register of MPs' Financial Interests. However, in July 2014, the Standards Commissioner ruled that Leslie had not breached the rules, although she had already apologised for any error.

For several months, Leslie chaired the Commons All Party Parliamentary Group on Saudi Arabia. Before Christmas, in 2016, she accepted a food hamper from the Saudi Arabia embassy in London. Leslie estimated the value of the gift to be approximately £500, and accordingly declared it in the Register of Members' Interests. In April 2017, she was part of a five-day delegation of a total of seven cross-Party MPs to Saudi Arabia. Travel and accommodation expenses were paid for by the Kingdom, to "strengthen British-Saudi Arabian diplomatic relations." This was also declared accordingly by Leslie in the Register of Members' Interests.

=== Brexit ===
Leslie announced before the Brexit referendum that she would support Brexit.

Previously she had been a member of the Fresh Start group of Conservative MPs, which campaigned for far-reaching reform of the European Union. She contributed to its work on social and employment law and on the EU's impact on the National Health Service. In 2011, she presented a Ten Minute Rule Bill to exempt the NHS from the Working Time Directive.

== In Bristol (2010– ) ==
Locally, her work has focused on transport. She has campaigned extensively for the re-opening of the Henbury Loop rail line around the north of her former constituency, and for the introduction of a smartcard on local transport.

She supported the creation of an elected mayoralty in Bristol, which became one of the few cities voting on an elected mayor to choose to have one in 2012.

She is a strong supporter of Free Schools and worked with local parents to form a "Parents Voice" group to set up the Bristol Free School, which, in 2011, became one of the first Free Schools to open.

In 2013, Leslie backed Bristol Rovers' plans to move to a new stadium. She spoke out strongly against the TRASH group's opposition to the proposal for a new Sainsburys on the current Memorial Ground site. Her petition on the subject attracted over 13,000 signatures. (The High Court review of the decision to grant planning permission was dismissed but in the event neither the supermarket nor the stadium were built.)

== Personal life ==
Leslie lives in Westbury-on-Trym in her former constituency. In her spare time, she enjoys surfing, writing, art, listening to Bob Dylan, running and swimming. She is the President of Avonmouth National Smelting Company Boxing Club.

She became engaged to John Darvall, a BBC Radio Bristol presenter and twice married father of four, on Christmas Day, 2014. Just before the 2015 general election Darvall was moved from his news based morning show to an afternoon slot to protect the BBC's impartiality and to avoid accusations of a conflict of interest if ever asked to interview Leslie during the election. The presenter strongly objected to the change. The two separated in 2016.

Parliament of the United Kingdom
Preceded by Doug Naysmith	Member of Parliament for Bristol North West; 2010–2017	Succeeded by Darren Jones
