= Hugo Rignold =

English conductor and violinist

Hugo Rignold at the Liverpool Philharmonic Hall

Hugo Henry Rignold (15 May 1905 – 30 May 1976) was an English conductor and violinist, who is best remembered as musical director of the Royal Ballet (1957–1960) and conductor of the City of Birmingham Symphony Orchestra (1960–1968).

After playing the violin and recording with many jazz and dance bands, and leading his own London Casino Orchestra, in the 1920s and 1930s, during World War II, Rignold began to conduct classical orchestras. Thereafter, he conducted opera at Covent Garden and then the Liverpool Philharmonic, beginning in the late 1940s, followed by the Royal Ballet and his long tenure with Birmingham.

== Biography ==
Born in Kingston upon Thames, England, the son of conductor Hugo Charles Rignold and opera singer Agnes Mann, Rignold was taken to Canada when his parents emigrated to Winnipeg in 1910. He began studying the violin as a child with John Waterhouse in Winnipeg and played in the orchestra of the Winnipeg Theatre. After returning to England in 1921, he studied at the Royal Academy of Music and then worked as a blacksmith for a time.

=== Early career ===
In the 1920s and 1930s, Rignold played violin with many jazz and dance bands of the day, including those of Mantovani, Jack Hylton, Jack Harris, Fred Hartley, Ambrose, Lew Stone and Jay Wilbur. Rignold was highly regarded as a jazz player. In 1936 The Gramophone magazine said of him, "With the possible exception of the Negro artist, Eddie South, and our own Eric Siday, who is abroad, there have been only two violinists who have hitherto meant anything to jazz – Venuti, of course, and more recently the French musician Stephane Grappelly (sic). To my mind Hugo Rignold is a greater artist than any of them." Rignold went on to lead his own London Casino Orchestra.

He made many recordings with these musicians, a good number of which have been reissued on modern CDs. Other classical musicians such as Leon and Sidonie Goossens, did likewise, but these early jazz and dance records caused some snobbish condescension towards Rignold later in his career (as later happened to André Previn). 1920s recordings in which Rignold played with the Jack Hylton Orchestra include George Gershwin's "Oh, Lady Be Good" recorded on 29 March 1926, and Irving Berlin's "Gentlemen Prefer Blondes" recorded on 17 August 1926. Both were for His Master's Voice at the company's studios in Hayes, Middlesex. Later, with Hylton as his mentor, he founded and led his own band, which was playing up to the beginning of the Second World War.

Rignold married three times: in 1934 to Rita Mary Gaylor (the actress Molly Gay); in 1941 to Phyllis Stanley; and in 1948 to Patricia Horton. There was a daughter by each of the first two marriages. The elder was Jennifer Gay, who became the first on-screen schoolgirl continuity announcer for Children's Hour on the BBC.

=== Post-war ===
While serving in the Royal Air Force in 1944, Rignold got the chance to conduct the Palestine Orchestra, now the Israel Philharmonic, and thereafter his career remained within the classical sphere. He was a staff conductor at the Royal Opera House, Covent Garden, 1947–1948; he directed the Liverpool Philharmonic (not then 'Royal') in the 1940s and 1950s, succeeding the popular Malcolm Sargent. A "period of unrest and strife" accompanied the beginning of Rignold's reign in Liverpool: Rignold replaced many older players in the orchestra, and some of the audience were unimpressed by his career in popular music.

In the 1949/1950 season with the Liverpool Philharmonic, Rignold conducted 34 concerts, with guest conductors, including Sargent, Rafael Kubelík, Zoltán Kodály, Sir Adrian Boult and Sir Thomas Beecham conducting a total of 19 other concerts. Rignold's programming there maintained a balance between presenting accepted modern and classical works and premiering new works, including Sergei Prokofiev's suite from Cinderella and works by Bohuslav Martinů, E. J. Moeran and Gordon Jacob.

From 1957 to 1960 Rignold was musical director of the Royal Ballet, In 1960 he became permanent conductor of the City of Birmingham Symphony Orchestra when Andrzej Panufnik unexpectedly resigned. He remained at Birmingham until 1968.

Rignold made a number of classical recordings, but did not have a long-term contract with any of the record companies, with the consequence that his recorded repertory was somewhat haphazard – accompanying concertos, or selections for operatic artists (including Maggie Teyte), and ballet music. Most of his records were made in the mono era, and some have been reissued on CD.

He was a car enthusiast and talented driver: it was said that "he would not be out of place on the Grand Prix circuit".

== Bibliography ==
- Mountain, Peter (2007). Scraping a Living: A Life of a Violinist. Milton Keynes, UK: AuthorHouse. ISBN 978-1-4259-8390-1.
