= Valentine Palmer =

British voice coach and actor (1935–2022)

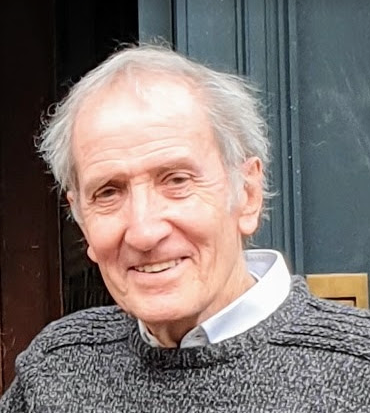
- Valentine Palmer in 2019
- Born: 24 July 1935; Middlesex Hospital, London, England
- Died: 10 January 2022 (aged 86); Grantham, Lincolnshire, England
- Education: Royal Academy of Dramatic Arts
- Occupations: Singer; voice coach; writer; actor; film producer
- Website: valentinepalmer.co.uk

Valentine Palmer (24 July 1935 – 10 January 2022) was a British voice coach, a singer and a television, film and theatre actor who appeared in Doctor Who, The Six Wives of Henry VIII, Minder, The Professionals, The Sweeney, Emmerdale, The Saint, Dixon of Dock Green, Crossroads. Valentine was also one of the presenters of ATV Today in 1966.

Palmer was the great nephew of Charles Lightoller, the most senior member of the crew to survive the Titanic disaster, and authored books on the subject promoting the debunked Olympic-Titanic switch theory. He also gave media interviews on the sinking, including on Channel 5's Live with Gabby on the subject. He died on 10 January 2022, at the age of 86.

Valentine’s final project was as a producer and writer on the documentary The Session Man. In production at the time of his death, it covers the life and career of the famous rock pianist Nicky Hopkins.

== Works ==
- Titanic!: The Strange Case of Great Uncle Bertie (2012) ISBN 978-1906263782
- How to be a Confident Woman Speaker in just 21 Days (2012) ASIN B00SRKXZVQ
- A Ruthless Conspiracy (2018) ASIN B0798S67BG
