= Jamie Reuben =

British businessman

James Reuben
- Born: James Adam Reuben; May 1987 (age 39); London, England
- Education: North Bridge House School; Regent's University London
- Occupations: Socialite; businessman
- Board member of: Newcastle United
- Parent: David Reuben
- Relatives: Simon Reuben (uncle)

James Adam Reuben (born May 1987), known professionally as Jamie Reuben, is a British socialite and businessman. He is son of billionaire investor David Reuben.

== Early life ==
James Adam Reuben was born in May 1987, the son of billionaire David Reuben. Reuben was educated at North Bridge House School and subsequently studied business at Regent's University London.

== Career ==
Reuben along with his older brother serve as principals at Reuben Brothers Limited, the private family investment office founded and run by his father and uncle David and Simon Reuben.

In 2011, Reuben, on behalf of Reuben Brothers Limited and alongside financier Andrew Danenza, co-founded the investment firm Melbury Capital. As of 2025, Melbury Capital is considered a micro-entity with increasing liabilities and a negative net worth.

In the 2012 London mayor election, Reuben served as chairman of Boris Johnson's re-election campaign committee. He has donated £816,000 to the Conservative Party, and is a member of the party's Advisory Board for significant donors.

In May 2018, Reuben's father and uncle bought the Burlington Arcade shopping mall and appointed Reuben as managing director.

On 8 October 2018, Reuben's best friend Amit Bhatia, who serves as the chairman of London-based football club Queen's Park Rangers, appointed Reuben as a club board member. Reuben stepped down from this role in October 2020.

In March 2021, Reuben was appointed co-chair to the Growth Board of homelessness charity Centrepoint.

In October 2021, Reuben's father and uncle became minority co-owners of Newcastle United after they acquired a 15% equity stake in the club. They subsequently appointed Reuben as a board member.

In October 2025, Reuben made headlines for denouncing Aston Villa Football Club's decision to ban Maccabi Tel Aviv away fans from attending a Europa league fixture between the clubs. Villa's decision was based on public safety concerns due Maccabi Tel Aviv fans tendency to incite and engage in violent clashes with locals and commit hate crimes. Reuben referred to this decision to protect public safety as "appalling".

== Personal life ==
Reuben lives in Marylebone, London. He previously dated British fashion designer Marissa Montgomery and American socialite Kim Kardashian.
