= Islamic Reporting Initiative =

IRI
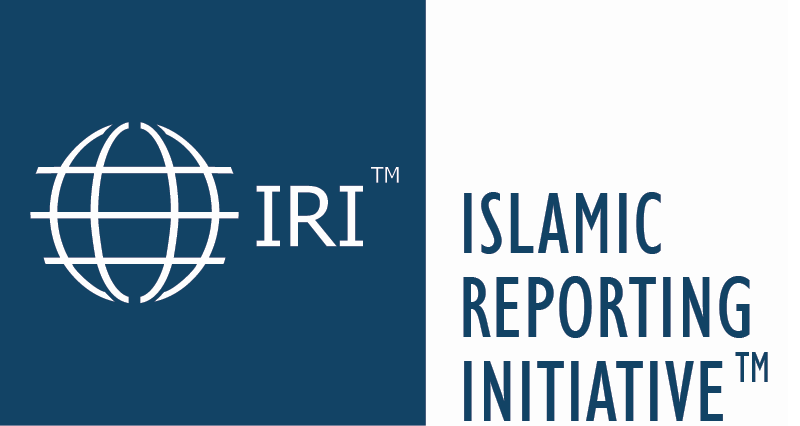
- Founded: April 4, 2015
- Type: Nonprofit organization
- Purpose: Environmental, social and corporate governance (ESG) and Sustainability reporting
- Headquarters: Amsterdam, The Netherlands
- Region served: Predominantly Islamic countries and member states of the Organisation of Islamic Cooperation (OIC)
- Official languages: English, Arabic
- Founder: Daan Elffers
- Chairperson: Mohamed Amersi
- Affiliations: Organisation of Islamic Cooperation (OIC)
- Website: Official website

The Islamic Reporting Initiative (IRI) is an independent nonprofit organization leading the creation of the IRI Standard: a reporting standard for Environmental, social and corporate governance (ESG) based on Islamic principles and values. Its objective is to enable organizations to inclusively assess, report, verify and certify their ESG and philanthropic programs in support of the United Nations Sustainable Development Goals.

According to the IOE Sustainability Reporting Handbook for Employers’ Organisations, the IRI Standard will provide comprehensive metrics and methods for effectively measuring and reporting on corporate social responsibility (CSR), with a particular focus on short- and long-term investments in extensive and relevant social and environmental aspects, including:

- Health provision and promotion
- Social investment
- Youth engagement
- Empowerment of the local workforce and entrepreneurship
- Development of STEM skills and knowledge transfer
- Environmental sustainability

Founded on April 4, 2015, the Islamic Reporting Initiative seeks to make ESG reporting standard practice in organizations across the Islamic world and OIC countries in particular. The IRI is headquartered in Amsterdam, The Netherlands, and (as of 2021) has members in over 50 countries.

The Islamic Reporting Initiative is an accredited organization (with observer status) to the governing body of the United Nations Environment Programme (UNEP), the United Nations Environment Assembly of UNEP.

== Background ==
Internal market research conducted by EMG in 2014 identified low rates of sustainability and CSR reporting despite a prevalence of sustainability and CSR practice in organizations where Islamic principles and values are an important element of corporate culture. The firm concluded that existing sustainability reporting standards, such as the Global Reporting Initiative (GRI) and ISO Standards, among others, were not always as practical or relevant in a local and cultural context.

The Islamic Reporting Initiative was set up with the aim of creating a mainstream reporting standard for CSR based on Islamic principles.

EMG supplied the initial funds of €230,000 (no related party transactions) as part of their own CSR program. Office space was provided by EMG, valued at €25,000 from 2015–2016. EMG Founder Daan Elffers performed all IRI-related duties pro bono. EMG's advisory board chairperson is Prince Pieter-Christiaan of Orange-Nassau, van Vollenhoven. Members of the advisory board include Gerrit Heyns, Michael Braungart, and Ida Auken, the former Danish Minister of the Environment.

== Islamic values and principles ==
The Islamic Reporting Initiative sees the values of peace, compassion, tolerance, justice, environmental management and human dignity as the foundations on which to implement enterprise sustainability and social responsibility on a universal scale. The application of IRI standards during social responsibility practices is guided by the values of responsibility and accountable for the free will Ikhtiyar on personal action, and the social justice towards the society as guided by Allah through the values of Zakat (charity) and Sadaqah or philanthropy (Buhr & Gray, 2012; IRI Foundation, 2019). Other Islamic values that inform IRI standards include unity through moral respect and equality on others and the society, and the assuming Khalifah (vicegerent) role by representing Allah on earth through stewardship over nature and other resources in the environment (Elasrag, 2018; IRI Foundation, 2019).

While the Islamic Reporting Initiative aims to support all types of organizations, not just Islamic banking and finance organizations, the IRI Standard will be compatible with Sharia-compliant finance.

== Recognition ==
- In 2017, the Islamic Reporting Initiative was recognized by the Cambridge IF Analytica Global Islamic Finance Report (GIFR) as one of the leading initiatives in Islamic Finance.
- In 2018, the IRI won the Global Islamic Finance Award for the category Sustainable Development Goals. The award was presented during the Global Islamic Finance Awards (GIFA) ceremony held in Sarajevo, in the presence of Bakir Izetbegović, Chairman of the Presidency of Bosnia and Herzegovina.

== Governance of the IRI Foundation ==
The Foundation (nonprofit) for the Islamic Reporting Initiative (Stichting IRI Reporting Standard) was founded on December 15, 2015. The Trustees/board members of the foundation for the IRI are its founder Daan Elffers; entrepreneur, thought leader and philanthropist Mohamed Amersi; entrepreneur Amal Daraghmeh-Masri; investor Gerrit Heyns; and scholar Abdel-Aziz Sharabati.

The IRI Advisory Council includes Hakima El Haïté, Delegate Minister in charge of the Environment of Morocco and Host of the United Nations Climate Change Conference (COP22) in Marrakesh, and Taher Shakhshir, former Minister of Environment for Jordan (Chairperson).

The IRI collaborates with a global network of governmental, corporate and nonprofit organizations worldwide, referred to as members. As of 2021, the IRI has members in more than 50 countries. On November 7, 2016, the IRI held its first round table as an official side event of the United Nations Climate Change Conference (COP22)

The Islamic Reporting Initiative (Stichting IRI Reporting Standard) is a signatory of the United Nations Global Compact and is a registered public benefit organisation as defined by the statute in the jurisdiction of the Netherlands ('ANBI' status).

== See also ==
- Environmental, social and corporate governance
- Sustainability reporting
- Sustainability accounting
- Triple bottom line
- Integrated reporting
- Organisation of Islamic Cooperation (OIC)
