= Conservative Middle East Council =

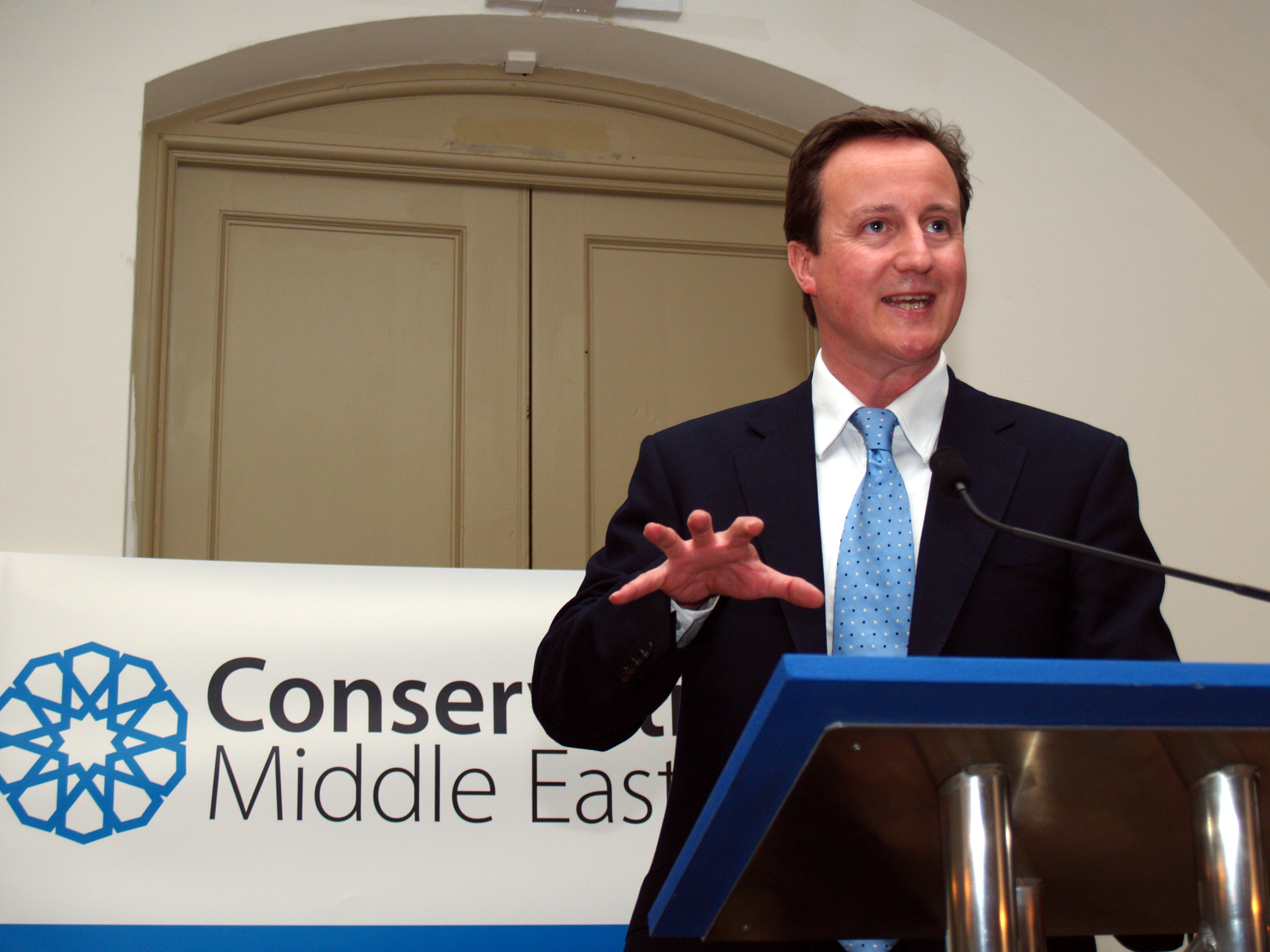
David Cameron, then Leader of the Opposition, addressing the Conservative Middle East Council in June 2008

The Conservative Middle East Council or CMEC is an organisation that exists to help ensure that British Conservative MPs and Peers better understand the Middle East. Its director is former MP Charlotte Leslie who was appointed in July 2017.

CMEC organises delegations of MPs and Peers to the region. Delegations have visited Palestine, Israel, Libya, Egypt, Syria, Bahrain, Saudi Arabia, Iran, Lebanon and Tunisia.

CMEC also organises a number of events in the UK. These include talks by experts in the Houses of Parliament, receptions and lectures. Its annual gala lunches have been addressed by prime ministers including John Major, David Cameron and Theresa May, and its flagship policy events have involved senior overseas politicians and diplomats such as US Secretary of State John Kerry.

== Long association with Conservative Party ==
CMEC has held regular fringe events Conservative party conferences. The latest fringe meeting exploring trade opportunities in the Middle East was held at the October 2021 Conference and was addressed by senior Middle East diplomats and other regional experts, including Baroness Nicholson of Winterbourne, Executive Chairman of the Iraq Britain Business Council.

A former CMEC chairman described CMEC's role in 2010, “As an organisation, CMEC seeks to ensure that UK foreign policy is grounded in a deep understanding of the complexities of the region. We do this by organising roundtable discussions, publishing original analysis, working closely with the Council of Arab Ambassadors, whose friendship and support we value greatly, and, crucially, sending delegations to the region.”

CMEC has had a long association with the Conservative Party dating back more than 40 years. It was former prime minister Margaret Thatcher who first suggested to Foreign Secretary Lord Carrington the idea of an organisation like CMEC to foster greater understanding of the Middle East and North Africa among Conservative parliamentarians. Current and former diplomats, along with journalists, ex-civil servants and senior ex-service personnel also make up CMEC's membership. CMEC has always shared its knowledge and expertise with anyone with an interest in the Middle East.

On 15 June 2011 Margaret Thatcher said: “When this Council was founded 31 years ago, during my time as Prime Minister, we could not have imagined how much it would achieve in bringing people together in the cause of greater understanding."

On July 18, 2019, Prime Minister Theresa May praised the work of CMEC during her keynote speech to the organisation's Annual Gala Lunch, saying, "this is a very important organisation ...next year it celebrates its 40th birthday, four decades of grounding Conservative foreign policy in a thorough understanding of the richness and complexity of the Middle East, and it remains vital work."

The Gala Lunch was one of Theresa May's last public engagements as prime minister. At the end of her speech, she added, "And I'm very pleased that it [one of her last engagements as PM] is for CMEC, which has done so much over its nearly 40 years to promote a more secure and prosperous world."

== Establishment of CMEC ==
In 1980, Sir Dennis Walters MBE, the Conservative MP for Westbury, established the Conservative Middle East Council, primarily to help give a voice to Conservatives who supported Palestinian self-determination. In 1967, following the Six Day War, Sir Dennis had visited the region with his Conservative colleague and close political ally, Ian Gilmour, to argue for the return of Palestinian refugees.

The establishment of CMEC by Sir Dennis followed the Venice Declaration of June 1980, when the then nine members of the European Economic Community registered their concern over the continued building of settlements in the Occupied Palestinian Territories.

Sir Dennis and other Conservatives also viewed continued settlement building in the Occupied Territories as an obstacle to peace and resolved that the traditional ties and common interests which link Europe to the Middle East obliged them to play a special role in working towards a lasting peace.

Sir Dennis was CMEC's first chairman and a decade later became its president. Knighted in 1988, Sir Dennis was an outspoken critic of certain aspects of the government's foreign policy in the Middle East, not least its decision to lend its support the US bombing of Libya, which was carried out in April 1986 in retaliation for Tripoli-sponsored acts of terrorism.

== Key players at CMEC ==
Many high-profile Conservative parliamentarians and ex-parliamentarians have played key roles for [i]CMEC. These include ex-Chairman Crispin Blunt, MP for Reigate, who served as chairman for many years, Baroness Morris of Bolton OBE and the former Foreign Office Minister the Rt Hon. Sir Alan Duncan KCMG.

Sir Nicholas Soames, the ex-MP for Mid Sussex, is CMEC's long-serving Honorary President. Directors have included Leo Docherty, currently Conservative MP for Aldershot and Minister of State at the Foreign, Commonwealth and Development Office, and Charlotte Leslie, the current incumbent in the post, and the former Conservative MP for Bristol North-West.

Other key supporters of CMEC have included The Rt Hon Kwasi Kwarteng MP, appointed as Chancellor of the Exchequer in September 2022, Richard Bacon MP, The Rt Hon Baron Bellingham, The Rt Hon Tobias Ellwood MP, Chairman of the Commons Defence Select Committee, and Phillip Lee, the former Conservative MP for Bracknell, and The Rt Hon Alistair Burt, former Minister of State for the Middle East at the Foreign, Commonwealth and Development Office, and the former MP for North East Bedfordshire.

== Continuing role for CMEC ==
In November 2021, CMEC led a delegation of Conservative MPs to the 17th IISS Manama Dialogue in Bahrain, the first such mission since the start of the COVID-19 outbreak. The role of CMEC was possibly best described in a 2016 joint statement by former chairman Sir Alan Duncan KCMG and current Honorary President Sir Nicholas Soames, “CMEC remains committed to engaging Conservative parliamentarians in Middle East issues and ensuring that foreign policy is grounded in a deep understanding of the region.” That remains CMEC's core mission to this day.

In January 2019, Charlotte Leslie wrote to then Conservative Party Chairman, Brandon Lewis, to inform him that the council was formalising its legal status by becoming a not-for-profit company limited by guarantee. The decision has in no way affected CMEC's close association with the Conservative Party. Its membership has always included non-members of the Conservative Party including academics, journalists, researchers, lawyers, ex-diplomats and retired civil servants and military leaders.

CMEC also provides extensive information about the Middle East and North Africa on its website. Anyone can also subscribe to CMEC's popular Daily Update which keeps subscribers up to date with the main news stories and events across the MENA region.

Other "friends" groups have the same legal status while maintaining close links with the Conservative Party, including the Conservative Friends of Israel, and a large number of other groups associated with the Conservative Party.

- Conservative Muslim Forum
- The Council for British-Arab Understanding (CAABU)
