= Peter Dubens =

British internet entrepreneur (born 1966)

Peter Adam Daiches Dubens
- Occupations: Investor and businessman
- Organization: Oakley Capital

Peter Adam Daiches Dubens (born 1966) is a British internet entrepreneur and investor. He is the founder of Oakley Capital, a private equity company, and its associated group of companies.

== Early life and education ==
He attended Sussex House School in Cadogan Square, Chelsea and then the Jewish Free School in Camden, North London.

== Career ==
Dubens became an entrepreneur in 1985 after the launch of his thermochromic t-shirt company. He sits on the board of Time Out plc. After his t-shirt business, which he sold to Coats Viyella plc for £8 million along with its six airport branches in 1990, Dubens became the Co-Founder of Global Inc Limited, a certified clothing supplier to UK leading retailers Marks and Spencers, C&A, and the Arcadia Group. Later that year, he co-founded of Global Accessories Limited, a UK distributor for Vans shoes and Eastpak bags).

In 2002, he set up a private equity fund manager, Oakley Capital.

As of 2026, through Oakley Capital, he holds a controlling interest in Dexters Estate Agency, with over 90 branches around London.

In June 2020, Dubens bought £803,000 worth of stock in Time Out Group plc at a price of £0.35 per share.

In July 2025, Duben's company acquired the luxury goods retailer Smythson for an undisclosed sum.

In December 2025, Duben's company acquired a majority shareholding in Athena Racing, the company which challenges for the America's Cup under the leadership of Ben Ainslie.

== Political activity ==
Dubens was a donor to the Conservative Party. He donated £50,000 to the party in May 2017 and £200,000 and £50,000 in December 2019. During the 2019 United Kingdom general election campaign Dubens donated £250,000 to the party. Dubens was a member of the party's Advisory Board for significant donors.

== Philanthropy ==
Established in 2019, the Peter Dubens Family Foundation (registered charity number 1187030) supports mainly UK charities and charitable projects in the areas of education, marine conservation, children’s welfare, and health.
