= ATV Today =

British TV news programme (1964–1981)

- Genre: Regional news
- Presented by: Bob Warman; Anne Diamond; Chris Tarrant; Derek Hobson; Wendy Nelson; Valentine Palmer
- Country of origin: United Kingdom

Production
- Producer: ATV
- Running time: Main edition: 30 minutes

Original release
- Network: ATV
- Release: 5 October 1964 – 31 December 1981

ATV Today was a regional television news and current affairs programme, produced by ATV, serving the English Midlands.

The programme aired from 5 October 1964 until 31 December 1981 – the final day of broadcasting from ATV before the company was restructured and relaunched as Central Independent Television.

== History ==
Regional television came to the Midlands on 17 February 1956 with the launch of ATV's weekday ITV service. The first news programme, a daily short bulletin called ATV Midlands News, was broadcast on 7 May 1956 – three months after the channel first went on air.

But following pressure from the Independent Television Authority for ATV to commit itself to greater regional coverage, ATV Today began on Monday 5 October 1964 as a 20-minute daily magazine programme, supplementing (and latterly superseding) the Midlands News bulletin and airing at 6.15 pm each weeknight.

The programme introduced viewers to more light-hearted journalism not seen on television at the time. One of the programme's longest-serving and best known reporters was the late John Swallow, a journalist who brought his own individual style of reporting both serious and lighter stories from the Midlands to television screens.

ATV Today reached its peak during the 1970s when it was watched on a daily basis by an estimated three million viewers.

The program ran for 30 minutes starting at 6:00 pm and consisted of serious news reporting with an entertaining format which differed from that of Midlands Today on the BBC because of its traditional news format.

Shorter ATV Newsdesk bulletins were introduced in lunchtime and late night time slots during the late 1970s and early 1980s. Towards the end of its run, the programme was extended to a full hour on Mondays and Fridays, including an extended sports magazine.

The programme was responsible for launching the television careers of many household names in British television. Among those who started as reporters and presenters on ATV Today are Chris Tarrant, who joined in 1972 initially as a reporter and newsreader but later specialised in light hearted stories, and Bob Warman, who presented ITV News Central until 2022.

As a result of the success of ATV Today, the station launched a number of non-news regional programmes for the Midlands.

Farming Today reported on countryside matters throughout the 1970s, and the long running London crime series Police 5, hosted by Shaw Taylor, launched a Midlands version as part of the programme during the 1960s. In the 1970s, the format was further developed with a children's version – Junior Police 5.

There was also an afternoon lifestyle programme, Women Today, and a weekly half-hour gardening programme, Gardening Today, recorded in the ATV Television Garden in King's Heath Park, and presented by Bob Price and Cyril Fletcher.

During the early 1980s, ATV's newsroom also experimented with ENG video cameras – one of the first regional TV news services in the UK to use the new technology.

== Criticism ==
Because the programme was based in Birmingham and tended to focus on news events in and around the West Midlands, it was often criticised for giving less coverage to other areas of the region, particularly in the East Midlands.

An attempt was made to address this after MPs and councillors from the East Midlands region lobbied ATV and the Independent Broadcasting Authority (IBA) for a separate ITV region.

ATV believed the cost of a separate region would be too expensive, but it did establish a small studio and newsroom in Nottingham after renting space at the city's Theatre Royal.

== Final broadcast ==
In 1980, all ITV regional franchises were up for renewal and the IBA decided that ATV's lack of regional programming and production was hampering the Midlands. It insisted that the new applicant for the franchise should be more clearly based in the region and have separate facilities for the East and West Midlands.

Although ATV won the new franchise, it was required to change its name and restructure the company.

The final edition of ATV Today aired at 6.30 pm on Thursday 31 December 1981 and included a compilation of John Swallow's feature stories, surrounding a mock trial sketch featuring Bob Warman and Wendy Nelson.

The following day, the programme was replaced by Central News, which launched separate news services for the East Midlands in 1983 and the south of the region in 1989. ITV News Central maintains separate news services for the East and West of the region.

== Presenters ==
Among those who presented on ATV Today were Bob Warman, Anne Diamond, Brian Maclaurin, Margaret Hounsell, Bill Spencer, Geoff Meade, Chris Tarrant, Wendy Nelson, Derek Hobson, Valentine Palmer and Shaw Taylor.

Others working on the programme included Lionel Hampden, Helen Piddock, Bev Smith, Terry Lloyd, Lance Beswick, Alan Jones, Mike Warman, Ted Trimmer, John Mitchell, Peter Plant, Wendy Jones, Val Lewis, Mart Gottschalk, David Eggleton, Lynda Berry, Terry Johnson, Tony Maycock, Sue Jay, John Swallow, Bob Hall, Rob Golding, John McLeod, Peter Green, David Lloyd, Jennifer Gay, political editor Reg Harcourt and former ITV News editor-in-chief David Mannion.

The sports team included Gary Newbon, Trevor East, Jimmy Greaves, Terry Thomas, Terry Biddlecombe, Nick Owen and ATV head of sport Billy Wright.
