= Fitzjohn's Primary School =

Location
- 86A Fitzjohns Avenue; Hampstead, London, NW3 6NP; England; 51.5536°N 0.1753°W

Information
- Type: Community Primary school
- Established: 1953
- Local authority: Camden
- Department for Education URN: 100026 Tables
- Ofsted: Reports
- Headmaster: Rob Earrey
- Gender: Coeducational
- Age: 4 to 11
- Houses: Air, Earth, Fire and Water
- Website: http://www.fitzjohns.camden.sch.uk/

Fitzjohn's Primary School is a community primary school in Hampstead, London. The school was established in 1953. The school took over the school buildings and some of the grounds that were previously part of the estate belonging to the Royal Soldiers' Daughters' Home. There is also a nursery school which opened in 2006. The school is authorised to have a maximum of 230 pupils, including the nursery intake.

== History ==
The Royal Soldiers' Daughters' Home was established in 1855 to provide a home and education to daughters of Crimean War veterans. This Victorian institution continued as a home and school until 2012 when it merged with another school.

The post–World War II baby boom resulted on increased pressure on class sizes in the Hampstead area. However, despite infant class sizes of up to 60 there was stiff resistance to the establishment of new Primary Schools as set out in the local authority School plan, particularly from other local schools. However, despite this opposition Fitzjohn's Primary School was opened in 1953. It replaced the Soldiers Daughter's Home school and took over the Home's schoolrooms, schoolhouse and chapel. The Home's former school buildings provided classroom accommodation for the infants school. A two-storey building, that was part of the original estate, also became part of the school and was used as an assembly and dining hall. A new single-storey block comprising three classrooms and ancillary buildings was built to accommodate the junior school. Over the first sixty years of the school there have only been five headteachers. The first headteacher of the school was Miss Mandeville. Poet Ted Hughes discussed poetry with a class in the late 1970s.

== Present day ==
The school takes children from just before their fourth birthday until age 11. It is a single entry admission school with a maximum roll of 212, excluding the nursery school which was established in 2006. Classes 1 to 6 follow the National Curriculum. The school, which was rated overall as 'Good' following its last Ofsted inspection in 2009 celebrated its 60th anniversary in June 2013.

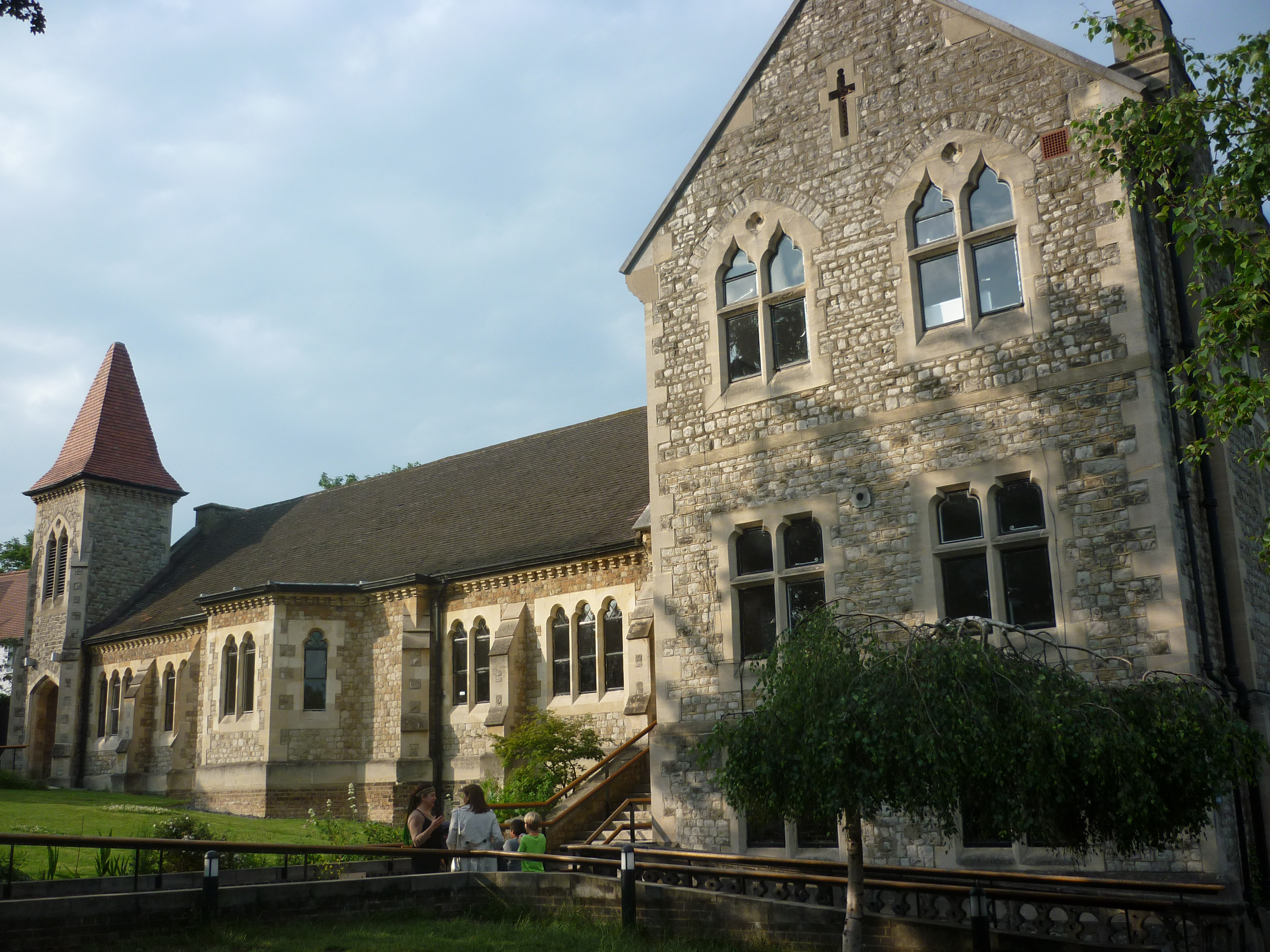
Victorian chapel and school buildings

== Buildings ==
The Victorian chapel and school buildings were designed by William Munt in a Gothic Revival style and was opened by Prince Albert and the Duke of Wellington on 18 June 1858. The buildings were constructed using Kentish rag with Bath stone dressings, tiled roof, a two-storey tower with broached spire, with entrance porch to ground floor. It was granted Grade II listed status in 2002. It was adapted for primary school use in 1953 and underwent major refurbishment in 2007, retaining the Victorian features, such as the scissors trusses. It now houses a large school assembly hall, a number of small classrooms, the main school reception and administration block. Reception and infant classes are housed in a modern building constructed in 2006. The three junior school classes occupy the refurbished 1954 school building.
