= Lubov Chernukhin =

Russian-British political donor

- Born: November 1972 (age 53)
- Occupation: Former banker
- Spouse: Vladimir Chernukhin

Lubov Chernukhin (née Golubeva) is a businesswoman born in the USSR. She has contributed significantly to the British Conservative Party, having donated over £2 million.

== Biography ==
Born Lubov Golubeva in November 1972, Chernukhin left the USSR for the US as a teenager. She was educated on the US East Coast, receiving a master's degree from the NYU Stern School of Business. Aside from her philanthropic work, Chernukhin acts as a VC Investor and is listed as a director of UK property firm Capital Construction And Development Ltd.

Following the 2022 Russian invasion of Ukraine, Chernukhin publicly condemned "all Russian military aggression in Ukraine" and urged for the "strongest possible sanctions against Putin's regime and its enablers". In September 2022, she wrote an Op-ed in Politico regarding what avenue the West should take in relation to the invasion.

== Business career ==
Chernukhin has been the Director of Capital Construction & Development Limited (CCD Ltd) since 2005. The company provides advisory services to clients investing in UK real estate and has operations in France and Portugal.

Chernukhin serves as chairperson of Ewelme Hills Hills vineyard, an organic vineyard and farm in Oxfordshire, England. She aims to have the vineyard's wines rise in dominance in the Pinot Noir and organic sparkling wine markets.

In November 2022, Chernukhin together with entertainment entrepreneur Graham Owen opened a family entertainment centre, Owens Entertainment in Hastings, England, which has been built in place of a former Debenhams store with the aim of repurposing the site.

== Politics ==
=== British Conservative Party ===
Chernukhin is the largest female political donor in British history having donated over £2 million to the Conservative Party.

Chernukhin is a member of the Conservative Party's Advisory Board for significant donors. In a February 2022 investigation The Times alleged that Chernukhin had repeatedly lobbied government ministers "against raising the tax burden on high net-worth individuals" and sent ministers research from Ernst and Young "on the importance of the ultra-rich for the overall economy" while a member of the advisory board.

Chernukhin's donations to the Conservative Party came under scrutiny after her husband was given a loan of $8 million by Russian billionaire Suleyman Kerimov through an offshore company in 2016. The transaction was first mentioned in FinCEN files leak which was reported by BBC News. The loan amount from Kerimov was subsequently repaid in the same year. According to BBC News, Chernukhin's lawyer stated that she "has never received money deriving from Mr Kerimov or any company related to him" and her "donations to the Conservative Party have never been tainted by Kremlin or any other influence". She has contributed to a handful of Conservative MPs including Priti Patel.

=== San Marino ===
On 8 March 2022, Lubov Chernukhin was awarded the Knight (Cavaliere) of the Order of Saint Agatha, a state order of the Republic of San Marino, in recognition of her charitable contributions particularly during the COVID-19 pandemic and also her efforts in promoting the interests of San Marino in the United Kingdom. The decoration was conferred by San Marino’s Secretary of State for Foreign Affairs, Luca Beccari, at a London ceremony attended by the Captains Regent, Francesco Mussoni and Giacomo Simoncini.
