= Ravi Kailas =

Indian entrepreneur

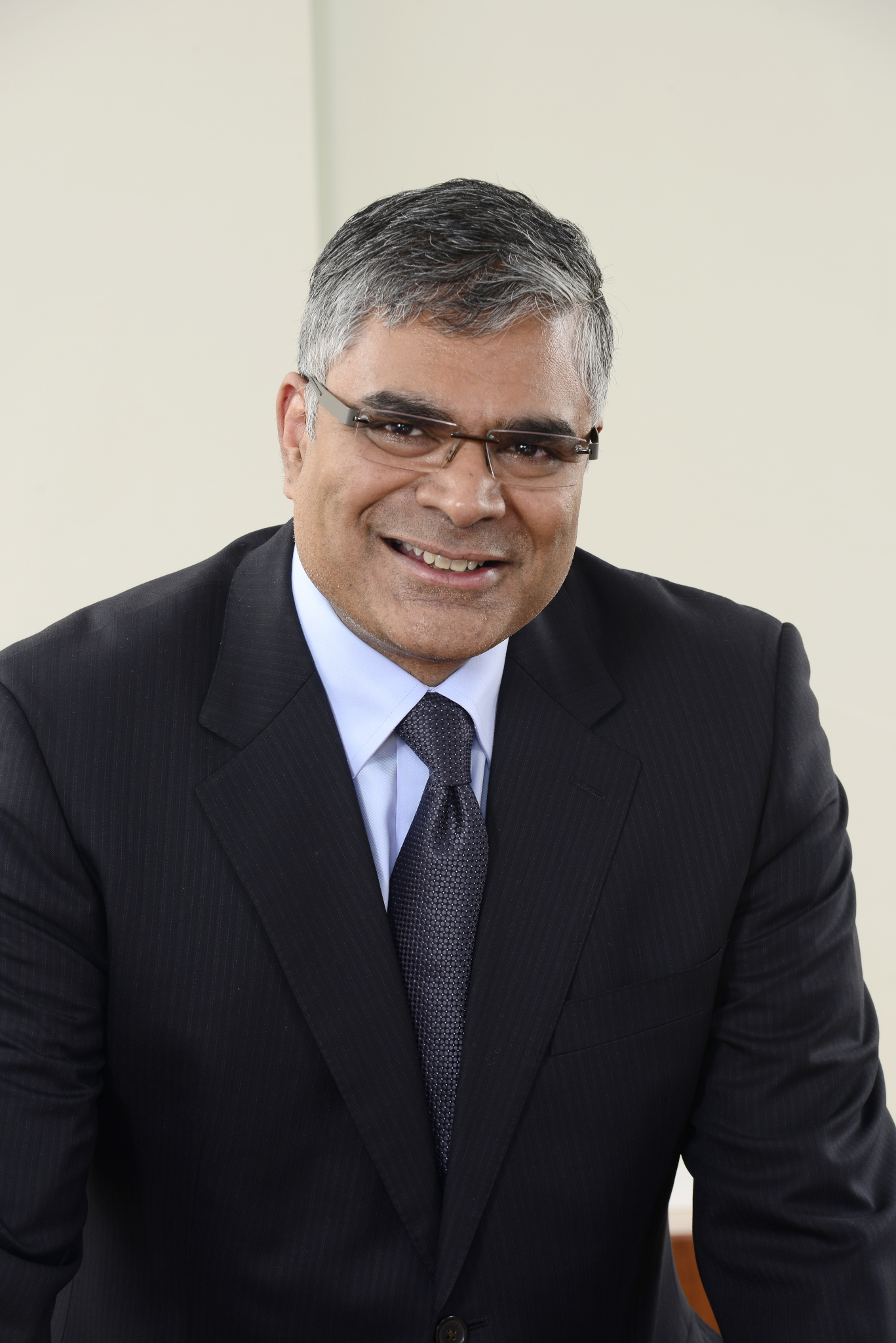
- Born: Ravi Shankar Kailas
- Education: Osmania University; Stanford University; The Hyderabad Public School, Ramanthapur
- Occupation: Chairman Mytrah Group

Ravi Shankar Kailas is an Indian entrepreneur. He is chairman of Mytrah Group, a business group in India consisting of Mytrah Energy, an independent renewable energy-producing company, and Mytrah Mobility, an electric vehicle ecosystem company.

== Career ==
In 1999, Kailas founded Zip Global Network, an independent payphone service provider. The firm designed and manufactured payphones that were assembled with computer components, and installed in major urban areas. In 2002, Kailas co-founded Xius Technologies, a telecommunications software company, and launched the world's first inter-operator prepaid roaming service. The same year, Kailas founded Altius Investment Trust, a real estate financial options company.

In 2009, Kailas founded the Mytrah Group. Mytrah Energy, the Group's first venture, owns and operates a renewable energy portfolio of wind and solar assets in seven states in India. Since 2016, the Group has diversified into electric vehicles and deep tech.

Kailas advocates for “open” philanthropy, where multiple sectors of society pool resources to tackle development challenges at scale. The Myth of the Entrepreneur, a book about this subject, authored by Kailas in collaboration with Cathy Guo, is to be published by HarperCollins in April 2019.

== Recognition ==
- Wind Power Person of the year 2015’ at the 3rd World Renewable Energy Conference held in New Delhi.
- Harvard Business School (HBS) wrote and taught a case on Mytrah Energy's creative capital formation. The case is entitled ‘Mytrah Energy’, and has been taught at HBS
