= Venice Declaration =

The Venice Declaration (also known as the Declaration of the Venice Summit) was an agreement issued by the nine-member economic committee of the EEC, which met in June 1980 in conjunction with Palestine Liberation Organization (PLO). The declaration called for the acknowledgment of Palestinians’ right to self-government, the PLO’s right to be connected to peace initiatives and Israel's right to a secure existence.

== Content ==
As tensions in the Arab-Israeli conflict escalated, European countries decided that the US-led negotiations were failing and that the seriousness of the situation required them to intervene. In justifying their role in the negotiations, the nine European countries cited their traditional and common interests as ties to the region. They based the Venice Declaration on Security Council Resolution 242 and Security Council Resolution 338. They emphasized, in the fourth point of the declaration, that they were primarily concerned with "the two principles universally accepted by the international community: the right to existence and to security of all States in the region, including Israel, and justice for all the peoples, which implies the recognition of legitimate rights of the Palestinian people". They also stated the need to establish boundaries in the Middle East and to maintain peace within them. While they said it was important to resettle the Palestinian refugees, the European leaders also stressed the value of self-government for Palestinians and that, like the Israelis, they should be involved in the process of peace settlement. Furthermore, the Declaration asserts that these principles are necessary for the establishment of peace and that everyone involved, both Palestinian and Israeli, should have access to Jerusalem. The nine European powers determined that Israel should "put an end to the territorial occupation which it has maintained since the conflict of 1967." They concluded by saying that force would be used to implement the Declaration and that they, the nine European powers, would reach out to the Middle Eastern nations in order to initiate the changes.

== Responses ==
In short, the Venice Declaration sought to establish boundaries and secure peace. In order to achieve that, they wanted to grant self-determination to Palestinians and to limit the territorial policies of Israel. It was through Arafat’s efforts that the Palestinians’ right to self-government was recognized and that the PLO was established as the umbrella organization for Palestinians. Thus, Arafat was put in charge of implementing the Venice Declaration because he was the head of the PLO. However, he was under a great deal of pressure from the Israeli rightists, who felt that the Declaration of Venice did not benefit them, and radical Arabs, who felt that the Declaration neglected the question of what to do with Jordan and the West Bank. Responses were also violent; Syria, through a Fatah official, contributed to the assassination a PLO representative in Belgium.

== Aftermath ==
In 1981, there were clashes between offshoot groups of the PLO and Israelis. They formed a cease-fire, but that raised complications because it suggested that the Israelis accepted the PLO. Israel became threatened by the fact that the Palestinians and the PLO were officially recognized, which contributed to a more heightened tensions. When Sadat was in Washington, D.C. in 1981, he suggested that Israel and the PLO participate in peace talks, but Begin rejected his suggestion. Furthermore, the Prince Fahd of Saudi Arabia wanted to “scrap the Camp David Agreements, have Israel withdraw from all Arab territories occupied since 1967, and the creation of a Palestinian state with its capital in East Jerusalem”. Egypt wanted to preserve the Camp David Agreement. The United States treated the Venice Declaration and its aftermath carefully; they were committed to Camp David, but did not want to come into conflict with the Saudis.
