= Devonshire House Preparatory School =

Coordinates: 51.5534°N 0.1774°W

Devonshire House preparatory school

Location
- 2 Arkwright Road; Hampstead, London, NW3 6AE; England

Information
- Type: Independent co-educational preparatory school
- Established: 1989
- Founder: Michael Loveridge
- Department for Education URN: 100080 Tables
- Headmaster: Mr Henry Keighley-Elstub
- Staff: 75 full time 16 part time
- Age: 2 to 13
- Enrolment: 319 Boys 262 Girls
- Houses: Austen; Churchill; Nelson; Nightingale
- Website: https://www.devonshirehouseschool.co.uk

Devonshire House preparatory school is a co-educational independent IAPS day school for children from 2 to 13 for girls and boys. The school is based in four large Victorian houses in Hampstead. The school currently has about 640 pupils.

== History ==
Devonshire House was established in 1989 by Michael Loveridge with his family. Mrs Stephanie Piper was appointed as the headmistress in September 2011 and was previously headmistress of King's House School, Richmond.

One of the school's buildings, 69 Fitzjohns Avenue, was previously the premises of the Queen's House School, an independent day school for girls aged between 9 and 18 established in 1947. The house at 4 Arkwright Road was the former residence of Francis William Topham (1808–1877), a painter and one of Charles Dickens' illustrators.

== Operation ==
The school is divided into four age groups. From age 2 to age 4, pupils are taught at the Nursery School at 6 and 4 Arkwright Road which is rated outstanding in all categories in its 2017 ISI report. At 4+, pupils move to the Lower School which is based at 69 Fitzjohns Avenue. Pupils move at 7+ into the Middle School based at 2 and 4 Arkwright Road. Finally, at 10+ (Year 6), pupils learn at the Upper School until they are 13 years of age. Pupils leave at 11+ or 13+. The school provides preparation for both exams. The school is noted for the excellence of its pastoral care and the preparation and quality of high quality food.

Devonshire House is one of a large number of schools in the area (see list of schools in Hampstead) which has contributed to school-run traffic congestion in Hampstead. The school has intervened and collaborates with the Transport4schools school bus project.

== Fundraising ==
Devonshire House has raised funds for two main charities over the past year, Rwanda Action and Mind. In addition over £15,000 was raised in the Big Sleepout in December 2020.

== Alumni ==
After finishing at Devonshire House most pupils transfer to London day schools. Over the past five years about half the boys have gone to either Westminster School, University College School, St Paul's School, Highgate School or City of London School. Over the same period about half the girls have transferred to either St Paul's Girls' School, South Hampstead High School, North London Collegiate School, Francis Holland School or the City of London School for Girls Channing School. Pupils also progress to boarding schools such as Wycombe Abbey, Winchester College and Eton College. According to the 2017 ISI report, "preparation for the transfer to secondary schools is outstanding". Over the past five years one in eight senior school offers received have been either a scholarship or an exhibition.
