= The Royal School, Hampstead =

Former girls' school in Hampstead, London, England

Coordinates: 51.5543°N 0.1749°W

The Royal School, Hampstead, was an independent girls' day and boarding school located in Hampstead, London, England. The school was founded in 1855 by Queen Victoria and for 157 years educated girls aged 3–18. The school had 2 longstanding royal patrons: the first was Queen Victoria for 70 years, and the second Princess Alexandra who retired in 2005 after 50 years of service. The succeeding patron was Camilla, Duchess of Cornwall. In 2011, the school merged with North Bridge House School at the end of the academic year (2011/12) under the management of Cognita.

The GCSE pass rate, in 2008, was 99%, with 89% of pupils gaining A* to C grades and a third achieving either A* or A grades.

The school site is now used as a senior campus of North Bridge House School.

== History ==
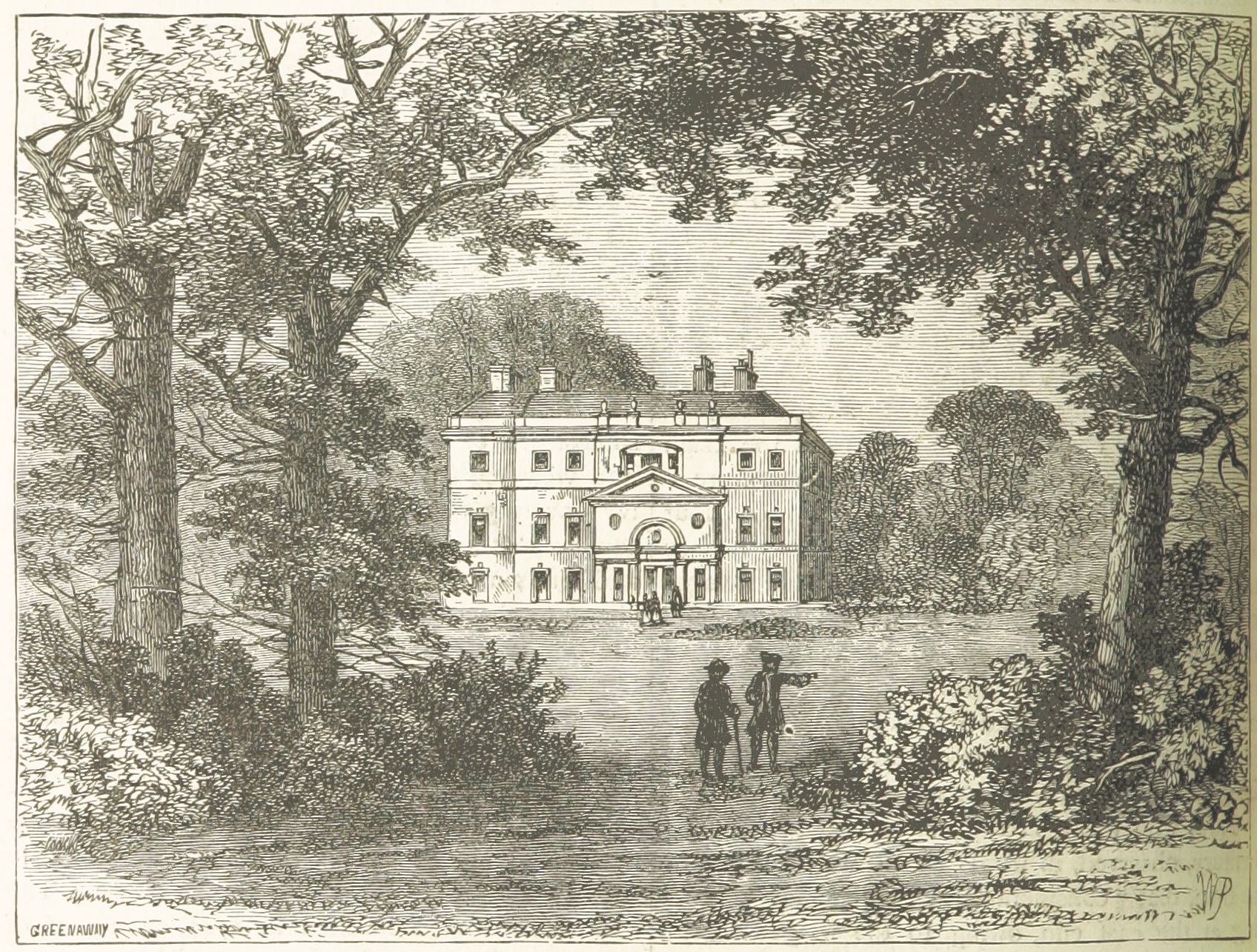
Vane House, home of the Royal Soldiers' Daughters' School as it was in 1800

The Royal School was founded in 1855 by Queen Victoria and Prince Albert as the Soldiers' Infant Home before becoming the Royal Soldiers' Daughters' School. It was the first school established "to nurse, board, clothe and educate the female children, orphans or not, of soldiers in Her Majesty's Army killed in the Crimean War". The school has a memorial site in the Hampstead Cemetery on Holly Walk to the daughters family members who were lost in the war. The school site was redeveloped in the 1970s after a fire destroyed much of the beautiful architecture. The land was divided and sold to refund the rebuild of the school – into the modern complex seen today on Vane Close. The last patron of the school, Camilla, Duchess of Cornwall, visited on 25 February 2009, to thank them for their fund raising activities for her charity, the National Osteoporosis Society.

== Notable alumnae ==
- Harriet Dart, tennis player
- Tulip Siddiq, Labour MP for Hampstead and Kilburn (2015–24) and Hampstead and Highgate (since 2024)
