= UCL Academy =

Coordinates: 51.5416°N 0.1719°W

Location
- Adelaide Road; Camden, London, NW3 3AQ; England

Information
- Type: Non-selective academy
- Established: 2012
- Specialist: STEAM
- Department for Education URN: 137181 Tables
- Ofsted: Reports
- Chair of Governors: Professor Alan J. Thompson
- Principal: Dr A McLean
- Age: 11 to 18
- Enrollment: 1000+
- Houses: 5
- Website: www.uclacademy.co.uk

The UCL Academy is a secondary school located in Swiss Cottage in the London borough of Camden, London, United Kingdom and sponsored by University College London (UCL). It opened in September 2012 with 180 students in Year 7 and reached full capacity as of September 2017.

== History ==
The concept of a new academy school in Camden sponsored by UCL was first announced by Malcolm Grant, the UCL Provost, in November 2007.

On 6 August 2010, Education Secretary Michael Gove announced that the academy would receive a requested £30 million capital allocation and would therefore proceed. It was revealed on 9 September 2010 that the opening of the academy had been delayed for one year due to the lack of funds. However, the academy went on to open in September 2012.

The academy admitted its first pupils in September 2012.

== Building ==
The academy is housed in new, purpose-built accommodations located on Adelaide Road. Facilities in the new accommodation include:

- suites of rooms for cross-curricular general learning called Superstudios;
- suites of rooms for art, music and drama, including performance spaces;
- science laboratories, and a science demonstration theatre for lectures, experiments and talks by visiting academics from UCL;
- an engineering science suite, including workshops and technology and science labs;
- House areas, providing places for students to eat together, and for informal study during breaks and before and after school.

Plans for the new building received planning permission in August 2010.

== Curriculum ==
The academy is a unique "STEAM" specialist school. The STEAM specialism consists of the following subject areas:

- Science
- Technology
- Engineering
- Art
- Maths

== See also ==
- Education in London
- List of schools in London
- University College School
