= Vladimir Chernukhin =

Russian former deputy minister

Vladimir Anatolyevich Chernukhin (Russian: Владимир Анатольевич Чернухин; born 31 December 1968 in Moscow) was the deputy minister of finance of the Russian Federation and Chairman of Vnesheconombank. Chernukhin has spent most of his life as a banker and businessman. Between 2000 and 2002, he served as a Deputy Minister of Finance in Prime Minister Mikhail Kasyanov's government. Chernukhin fled to the UK after Vladimir Putin dismissed him in 2004 and he is known to be a loyalist to former Russian prime minister Mikhail Kasyanov, who in 2005 became an opponent of Putin. He received British citizenship in 2011.

== Career in Russia ==
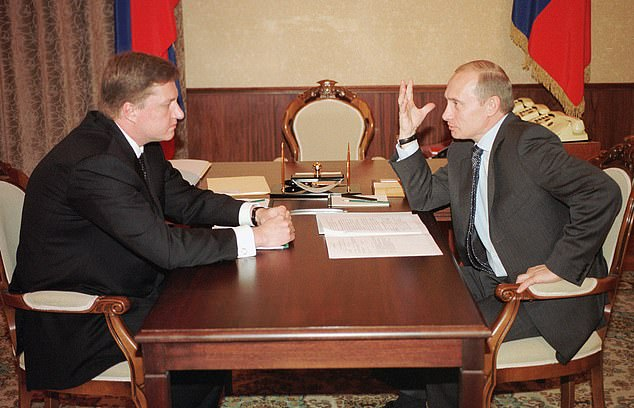
Chernukhin meeting with President Vladimir Putin on 15 November 2002

Chernukhin was born in Moscow on 31 December 1968 in Moscow. From 1986 to 1996, he worked at Tekhnopromimport, a trade house of the USSR and the Russian Federation devoted to the import of industrial machinery. During that period, he also obtained undergraduate degrees in Diplomacy and Economics from the Moscow Institute of International Economic Relations. From 1996 to 1999, Chernukhin worked as Deputy Head and the Head of the Credit Department of Vneshekonombank, a state owned commercial bank in the Russian Federation. In 1999, Chernukhin was appointed to the position of Deputy Chairman of Vneshekonombank. In 2000, then Prime Minister Mikhail Kasyanov appointed Chernukhin as a Deputy Minister of Finance of the Russian Federation.

As a Deputy Minister of Finance, Chernukhin reported to Kasyanov. He was responsible for the Department of Foreign Financial Assets and the Department of State Loans and Guarantees. He was also responsible for the cooperation of the Russian Federation with the Paris Club of creditors, an informal group of creditors whose role is to find coordinated and sustainable solutions to the payment difficulties experienced by the world's poorest debtor countries. In the year 2002, Chernukhin was appointed as Vneshekonombank's Chairman. During his tenure in that role he negotiated and signed several cooperation agreements, the purpose of which was to secure credit and guarantee support for the export and investment undertakings of Russian companies carried out in cooperation with foreign companies.

Chernukhin earned a Candidate of Science (PhD equivalent) degree in economics from the Moscow Finance Academy and, in 2003, he was ranked among the 100 top managers of the Russian Federation. The same year, he was named as one of the "Global Leaders for Tomorrow", at the Davos World Economic Forum. On 15 April 2004, Chernukhin was awarded the Order of Honour in Russia for his achievements in finance and economics. Shortly after, in May 2004, Chernukhin was dismissed as Chairman of Vneshekonombank due to his close association with Mikhail Kasyanov. Kasyanov and his entire government had been dismissed by President Putin three months earlier (in February 2004) due to fundamental differences in policy.

== Personal life ==
Chernukhin fled Russia in November 2004 when it became known that Mikhail Kasyanov was forming organised opposition to President Putin so that he could oppose him at the 2008 Presidential election.It was reported that as an associate of Kasyanov, Chernukhin feared for his personal safety and feared unjustified political persecution. He has never returned since. In 2007, Chernukhin married Lubov Chernukhin. Mikhail Kasyanov, who at the time was campaigning against President Putin in respect of the upcoming presidential election in Russia, was one of the two witnesses at the civil ceremony of the wedding.

The Electoral Commission register shows that Lubov Chernukhin has donated in excess of £2 million to the Conservative Party . In the UK media, the Conservative party has been heavily criticised for accepting donations from the Chernukhins. The UK press has frequently accused her for allegedly using her husband's wealth for these donations. However, in 2022 Lubov Chernukhin's representative confirmed that all of her political donations have derived from her own funds.

== Emigration to the United Kingdom ==
Chernukhin fled to the UK after Vladimir Putin dismissed him in 2004. As per the media reports, Chernukhin is known to be a loyalist to former Russian prime minister Mikhail Kasyanov, who in 2005 became an opponent of Putin. When Chernukhin fled to the UK, Nathaniel Rothschild gave him a job at JNR, a company in which Rothschild was chairman. Chernukhin worked in London, where he was paid a salary of £275,000 per annum to work on a liquified natural gas project located in New York. When Rothschild was subsequently in severe financial difficulty after the financial crisis, Chernukhin claimed to have returned the salary he had earnt at JNR to Rothschild. In 2019, The Times reported that Rothschild allegedly provided Chernukhin the job post in such a way that it "did not require him to do any work". However, Chernukhin denied such allegations.

== Controversies ==
=== Litigation with Oleg Deripaska ===
In the early 2000s, Chernukhin entered into a joint venture business named as Navio Holdings Ltd with Oleg Deripaska. The business, a textiles company, owned highly valuable real estate in Moscow. In 2010, however, six years after Chernukhin fled Russia, Deripaska allegedly staged an armed takeover of the business. In 2013, Deripaska agreed to buy Chernukhin's stake in the company for $100 million. Although, Deripaska subsequently retracted his commitment on this deal and Chernukhin therefore issued legal proceedings against him, who responded by pursuing a knowingly false case, alleging that he was never Chernukhin's business partner. Deripaska allegedly paid a multi-million dollar bribe to a key witness to support his false case. However, all of Deripaska's claims were dismissed and he was ordered to pay Chernukhin approximately $100 million for his stake in the joint venture business. The legal dispute between Chernukhin and Deripaska has spanned several years. In 2022, Deripaska would face trial for alleged contempt of Court. While the legal proceeding was going on in the UK, in 2018 the US Justice Department accused Deripaska of "extortion, racketeering, bribery, links to organized crime and even ordering the murder of a businessman" as The New York Times reported. Deripaska had held in past and currently does have a close tie with Putin. Deripaska has been imposed with economic sanctions by both the US and the UK for his deep connection with Kremlin.

=== Kerimov payment ===
In 2020, the BBC reported that it had uncovered documents showing that Chernukhin had received $8 million (£6.1 million) from a company linked to Suleyman Kerimov, a Russian oligarch who is the subject of economic sanctions in various jurisdictions.

=== Pandora Papers investigation ===
In October 2021, the BBC and The Guardian published articles about Chernukhin and his wife based on the Pandora Papers. They reported that leaked files had revealed that the Chernukhins used offshore structures to keep their wealth secret. The reports also concluded that there is no evidence found that the Chernukhins acted illegally. In his litigation with Deripaska, Chernukhin's evidence was that he used trust structures to protect his assets from attack after his escape from Russia.
