= North Bridge House School =

Independent school in Camden and Islington, London, England

Location
- London Borough of Islington, Greater London, N1 2NQ; England; 51.5366°N 0.1469°W

Information
- Type: Private school
- Established: 1939; 87 years ago
- Gender: Coeducational
- Age: 11 Years to 18
- Houses: Turing, Orwell, and Levy
- Colours: Blue, Black, White
- Former Pupils: Old Northbridgeans
- Website: www.northbridgehouse.com

North Bridge House School is a private school located in Canonbury, Islington, in London for 11 to 18-year-olds. It includes a Senior School and Sixth Form.

North Bridge House Canonbury Senior and Sixth Form is led by Headteacher Charlotte Tassell-Dent. The school is owned and operated by the Cognita group, founded in 2004.

== History ==
In 1939, North Bridge House School was set up as a junior and preparatory school in St John's Wood. By the 1950s, the school had moved to 8 Netherhall Gardens, Hampstead, which housed the Pre-Prep (Junior) School. A reorganisation of the school during the 1960s resulted in the move of older Prep School students to two Nash houses near Regent's Park. Around the same time, the nursery was opened in a Victorian villa on Fitzjohns Avenue.

Later, in 1987, the whole Prep School was moved to a former convent in Gloucester Avenue, Primrose Hill, previously occupied by the Japanese School of London. At the same time, the Senior School was set up, taking pupils to the age of 16.

In 2012, the Royal School, Hampstead, was merged with North Bridge House, its former location now the Hampstead Senior School. In the same year, the North Bridge House Senior School in Canonbury was set up. It is in a 500-year-old Grade II-listed building next to Canonbury Tower in Islington.

In September 2025, North Bridge House's Regent’s Park campus on Gloucester Avenue near Regent's Park became Alleyn’s Regent’s Park, joining the Alleyn’s Schools Group and educating children from ages 4–11. The North Bridge House Hampstead campuses (including the sites on Fitzjohns Avenue and Netherhall Gardens) transitioned to become Alleyn's Hampstead in September 2026, an all-through school for ages 2–18.

== The school ==
North Bridge House Canonbury Senior School and Sixth Form, operated by Cognita, is a mixed-ability, co-educational school that educates children aged 11 to 18. In 2024, the school reported across all subjects 66% 7-9 grades at GCSE, and 40% A-A* at A Level. In 2026, the school reported across all subjects 62.2% 7-9 grades at GCSE.

== Notable former pupils ==
- Jamie Reuben (born 1986), British heir and financier
