= The Academy School =

Coordinates: 51.5551°N 0.1786°W

Academy School

Location
- Pilgrims Place, Rosslyn Hill; Hampstead, London, NW3 1NG; England

Information
- Type: Independent co-educational preparatory school
- Established: 1997
- Founder: C Sandars, Garth Evans
- Department for Education URN: 131291 Tables
- Headmaster: Garth Evans
- Age: 6 to 13
- Website: www.academyschoolhampstead.com

The Academy School is an independent preparatory school for boys and girls aged between 6 and 13. It is located in Hampstead, London and has been operating since 1997.

== Operation ==
Children are accepted at any point in the academic year and at any point in their academic career.

The school aims to '...give pupils the confidence and grounding they require in order to meet their objectives and achieve entrance into their next schools... Within a culture of mutual respect and equality, the school also aims for the children to value themselves as the individuals they are'.

The Academy School has received consistently high ratings from sources such as The Good Schools Guide.
