= St Margaret's School Hampstead =

St Margaret's School

Location
- 18 Kidderpore Gardens; Hampstead; London, NW3 7SR; England; 51.557805°N 0.19032°W

Information
- Type: Private
- Department for Education URN: 100062 Tables
- Gender: Female
- Enrolment: 150
- Website: http://www.st-margarets.co.uk/

St Margaret's School (Hampstead) is a private girls' school in Hampstead, North London. The school has 170 girls (ages 4 to 16) and 25 teachers. In 2008, 2009 and 2023 the school came top of the Sunday Times' Small Independent Schools' league table.

== History ==
Because the school was privately owned for the first 70 or so years of its existence, there are few official records of its early years. The first mention of "St Margaret’s" is in 1898, when a newspaper advertisement appeared, announcing that Elizabeth Isabella Tulloch would be moving the school to "St Margaret’s, Oak Hill Park." Tulloch, the school's founder, was principal of the school, and its owner, for 44 years.

In 1928 Hilda Jean Copinger took over on Tulloch's retirement, with co-principal Margaret Macrae overseeing the academic side. The joint rule was formally dissolved in 1933.

== Location ==
Since 1954 the school has one main building and two outside classrooms in Kidderpore Gardens in the residential part of Hampstead.
