= List of Wrexham A.F.C. players (1–24 appearances) =

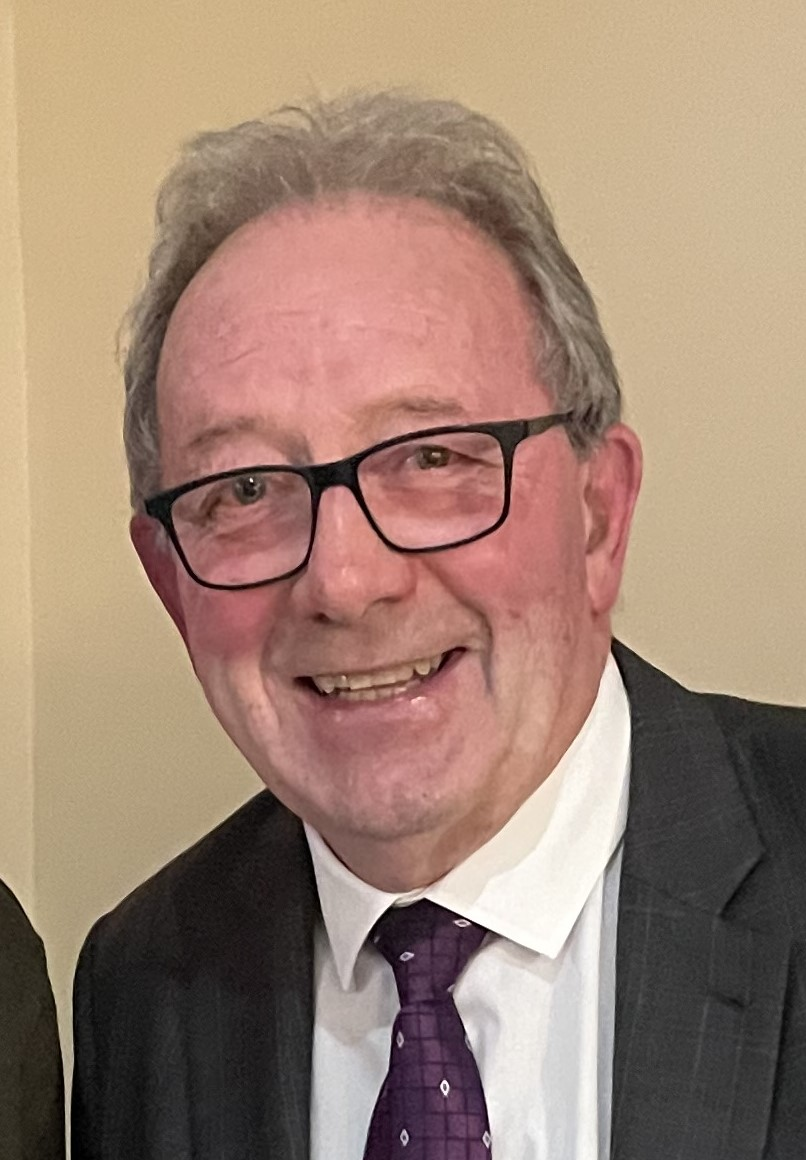
Jimmy Case made four appearances for Wrexham at the end of the promotion-winning 1992–93 season.

Wrexham Association Football Club is an association football club based in Wrexham, Wales. Founded in October 1864, it is the oldest football club in Wales and the third-oldest professional association football team in the world. After playing in the Combination and regional leagues for several years, Wrexham joined the Football League shortly after the First World War, as a founding member of the new Third Division North. The club remained in the Football League for over 85 years, before they were relegated to the National League in 2008. They remained in the fifth tier of English football for the next 15 seasons, missing out on promotion through the play-offs on five occasions. Wrexham achieved three promotions in three seasons, from 2022 to 2025, through winning the 2022–23 National League, finishing runner-up in the 2023–24 EFL League Two and also in the 2024–25 EFL League One. Thus, Wrexham secured a spot in the EFL Championship, and became the first club across the top five tiers of English football to achieve three consecutive promotions.

Wrexham's first team has competed in numerous nationally and internationally organised competitions. As of the end of the 2023–24 season, a total of 899 players have appeared in fewer than 25 such matches for the club. The list includes six players who are still contracted to the club, so can add to their appearance total. Six Wrexham players with fewer than 25 appearances went on to manage the club – Les McDowall (1949–1950), Peter Jackson (1950–1955), Cliff Lloyd (1955–1957 and 1959–1960; caretaker 1961, 1965, 1967), Alvan Williams (1967–1968), John Neal (1968–1977) and Bobby Roberts (1982–1985). Joe Jones, who played nine times between 1881 and 1883, was Wrexham's first player to score a hat-trick, which he did on 3 November 1883 (this was also the first time a player had scored four goals).

== Key ==
- The list is ordered first by date of debut, and then if necessary in alphabetical order by surname.
- Appearances as a substitute are included. This feature of the game was introduced in the Football League at the start of the 1965–66 season.
- Statistics are correct up to and including the match played on 21 March 2026. Where a player left the club permanently after this date, his statistics are updated to his date of leaving.

Positions key
Pre-1960s		1960s–	
GK	Goalkeeper		
FB	Full-back	DF	Defender
HB	Half-back	MF	Midfielder
FW	Forward		

Nationality
Unless otherwise noted, the nationality of a player is determined by the country/countries which he has played for, or if said person has not played international football, their country of birth.
Position
Playing positions are listed according to the tactical formations that were employed at the time. Thus, the change in the names of defensive and midfield positions reflects the tactical evolution that occurred from the 1960s onwards.
Club career
Club career is defined as the first and last calendar years in which the player appeared for the club in any of the competitions listed below.
Total appearances and Total goals
Total appearances and goals comprise those in the Combination, Welsh Senior League, Birmingham & District League, English Football League, National League, FA Cup, EFL Cup, Welsh Cup, FA Trophy, EFL Trophy, UEFA Cup Winners' Cup and Scottish Challenge Cup. Matches in wartime competitions are excluded.

== Players ==
As of match played 7 November 2026

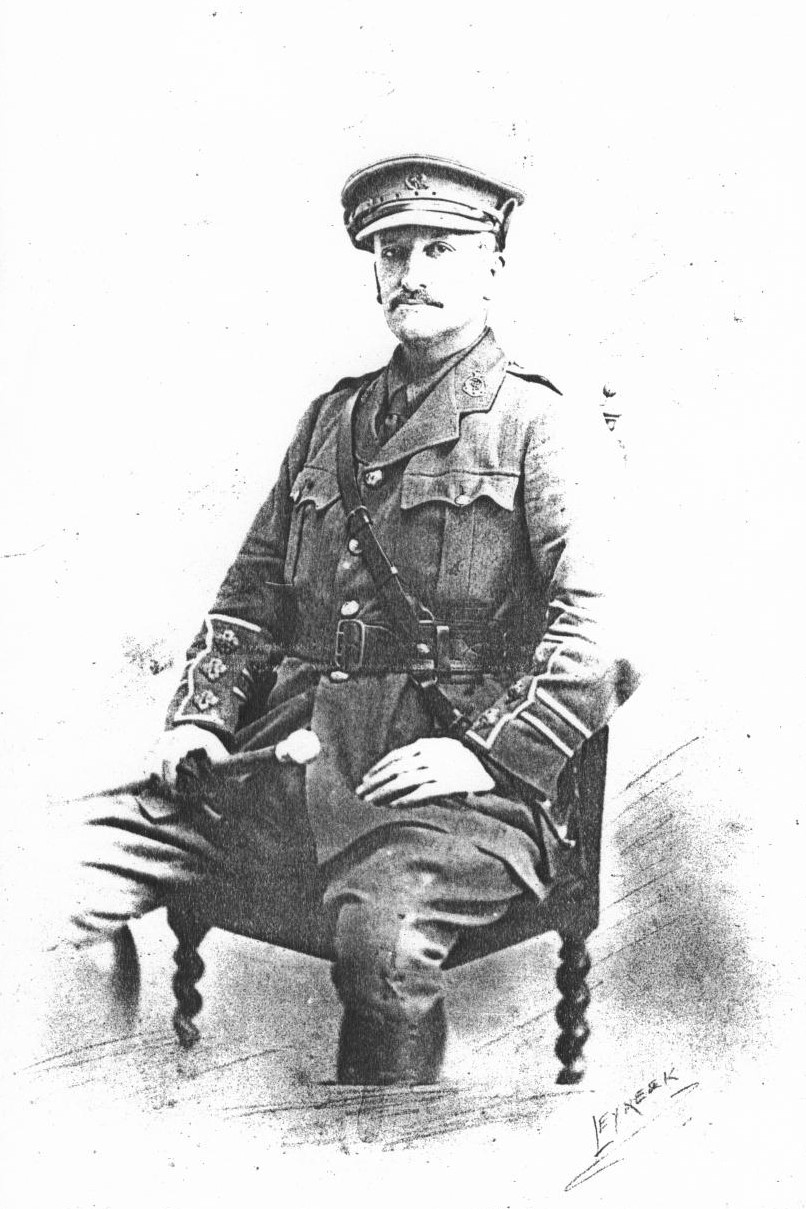
John Eyton-Jones made 2 appearances for Wrexham in the 1880s.

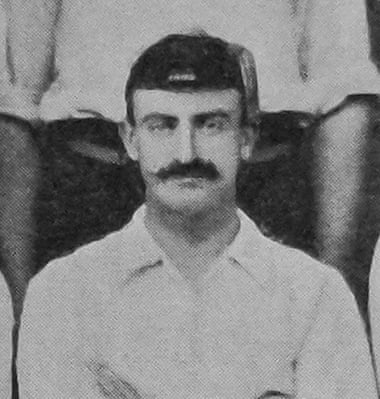
Harry Trainer scored two goals in his one appearance for Wrexham in 1900.

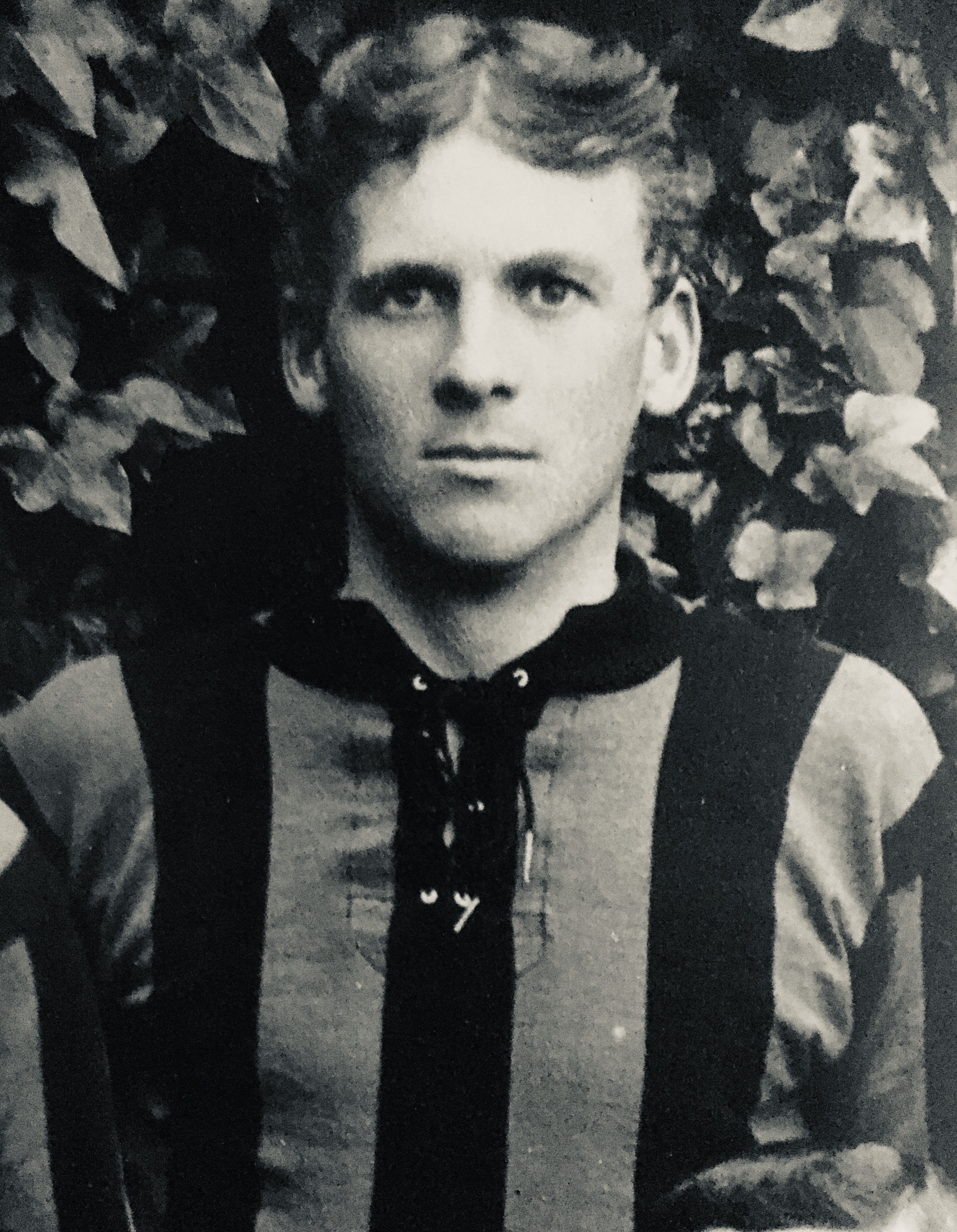
Alf Bishop made nine appearances for the Red Dragons in the 1920–21 season.

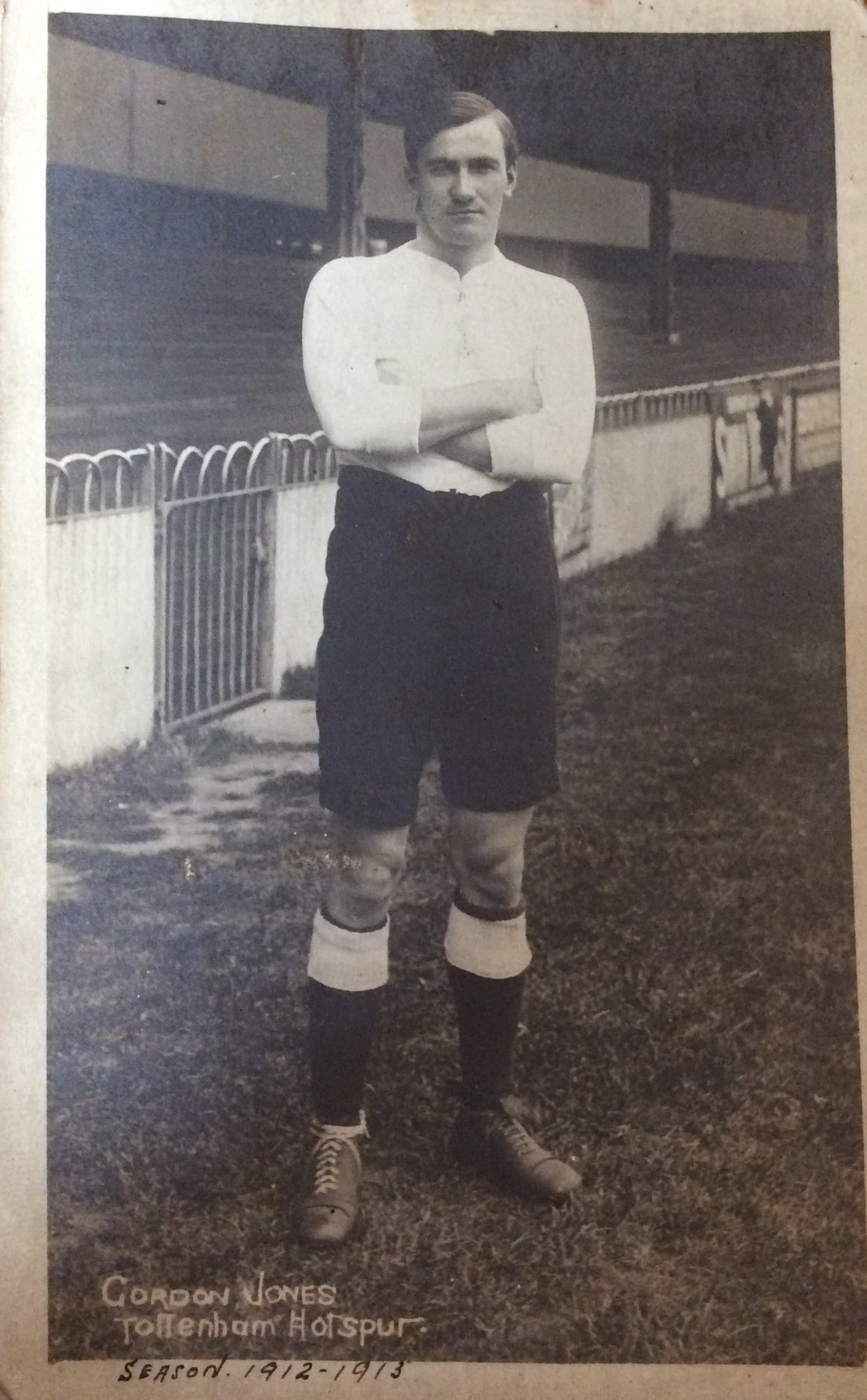
Gordon Jones scored in his only game for Wrexham.

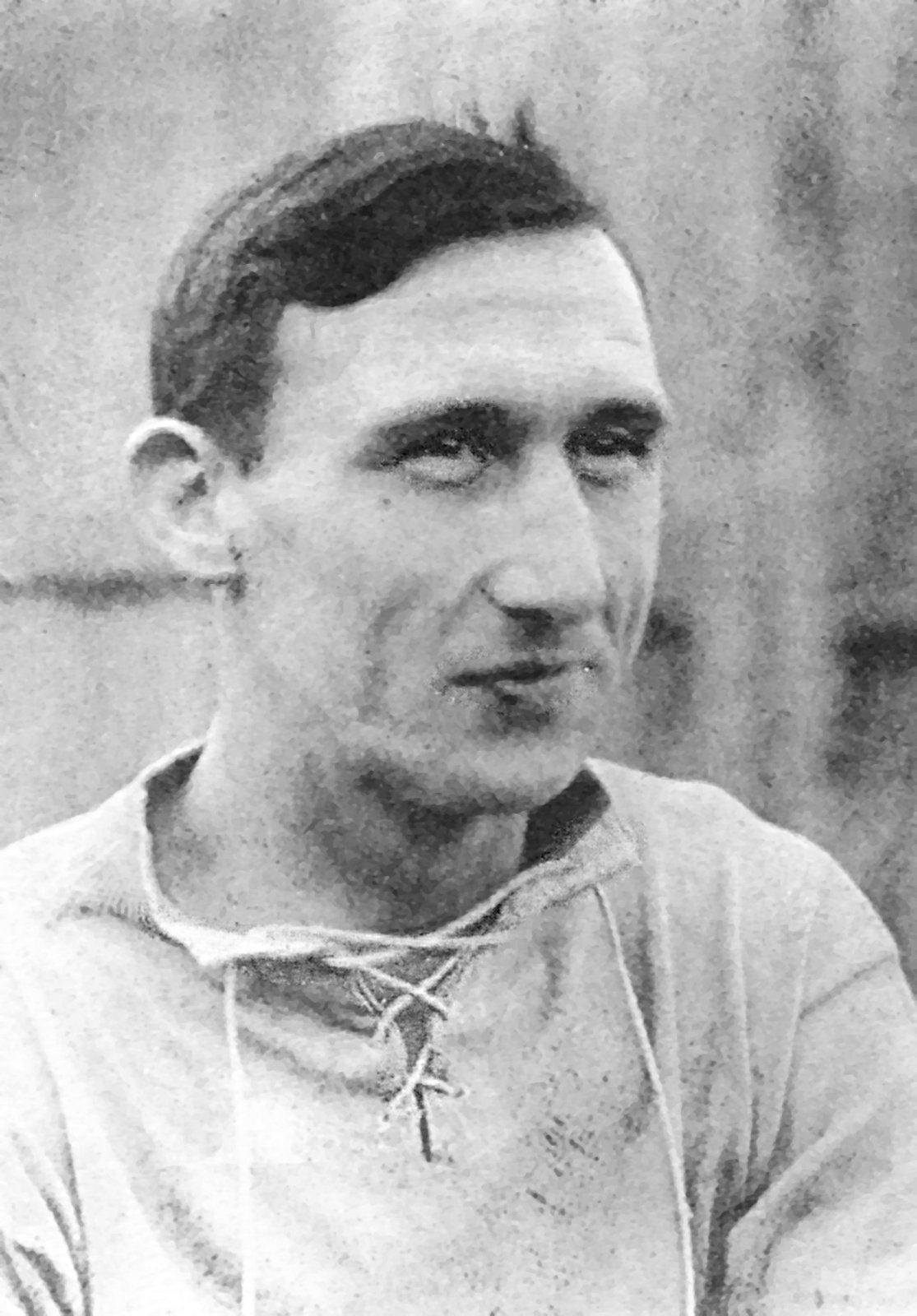
Stan Rowlands made nine appearances for Wrexham during 1922 and 1923.

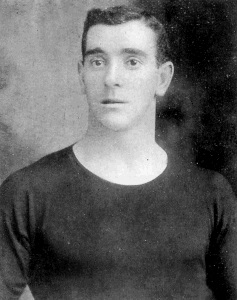
Tommy Boyle ended his playing career with Wrexham, playing seven times for the club.

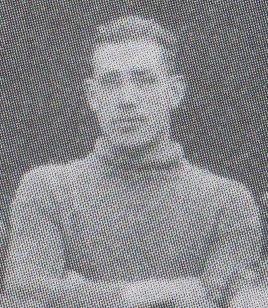
Jack Prince made four appearances for Wrexham.

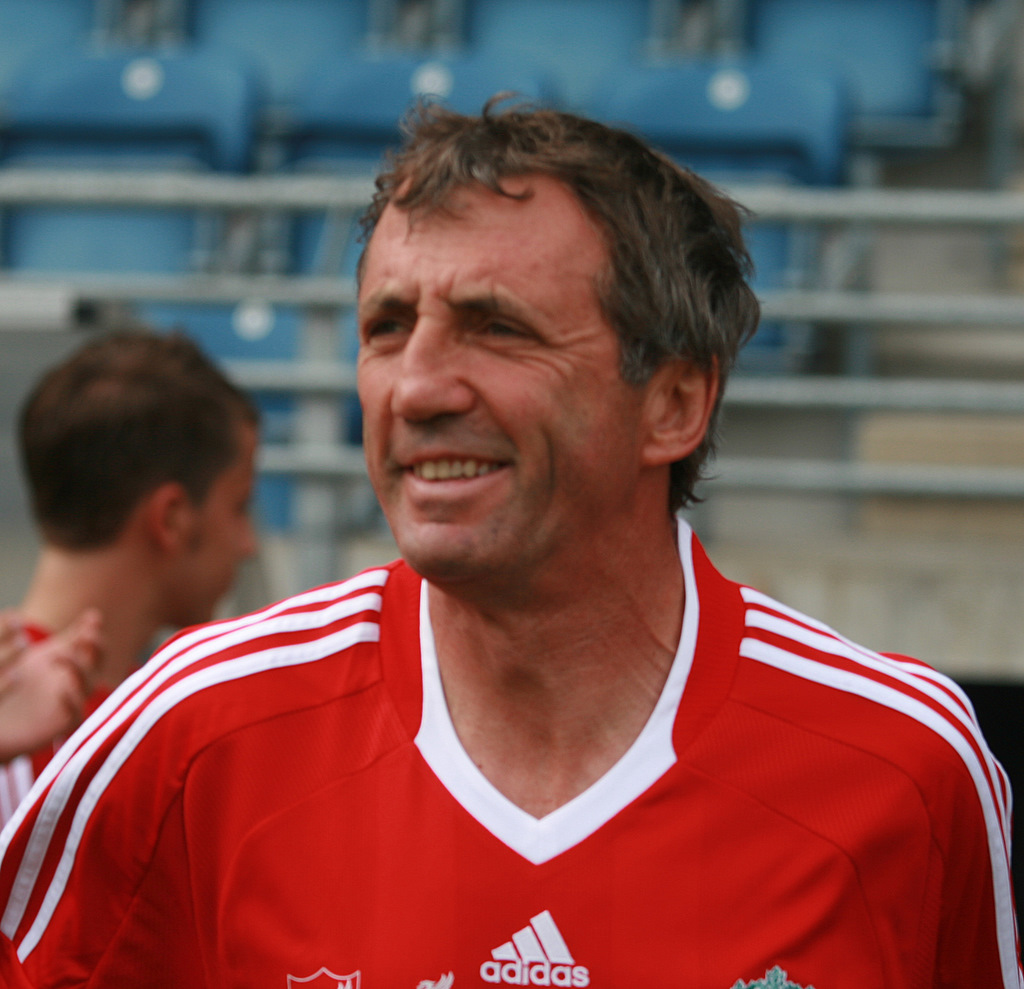
Alan Kennedy played 24 times for the Red Dragons.

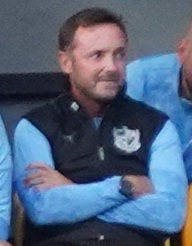
Simon Ireland played 5 games for Wrexham on loan in 1992.

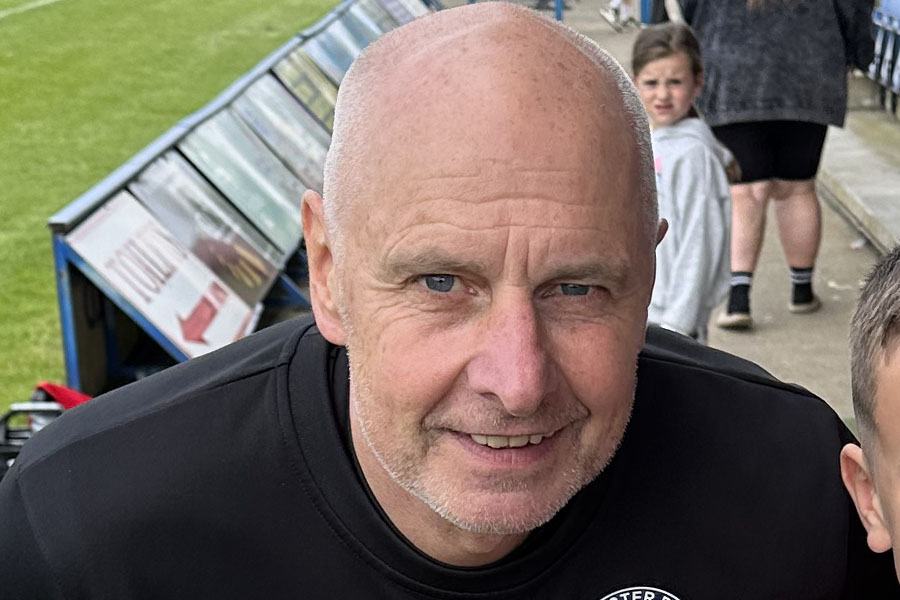
Ken Hughes, pictured in 2023, played 10 games for Wrexham in the 1992–93 season.

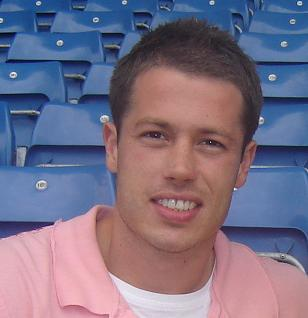
Steve Basham played six times during a month-long loan spell at Wrexham in 1998.

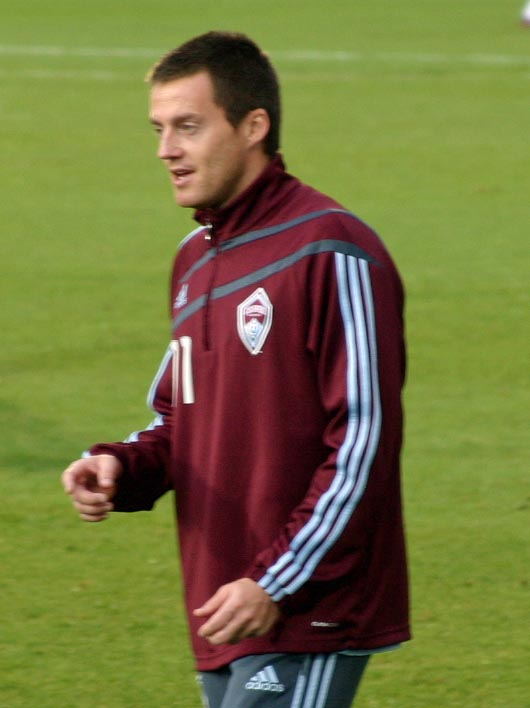
Terry Cooke played 13 times during the 1998–99 season.

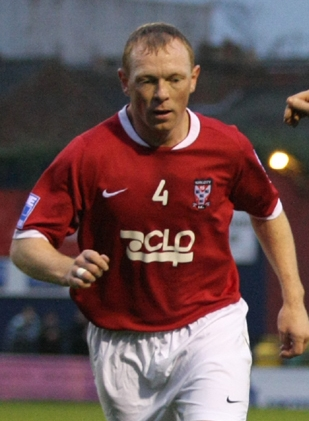
During a short loan spell, Stuart Elliott appeared in 13 games at the Racecourse.

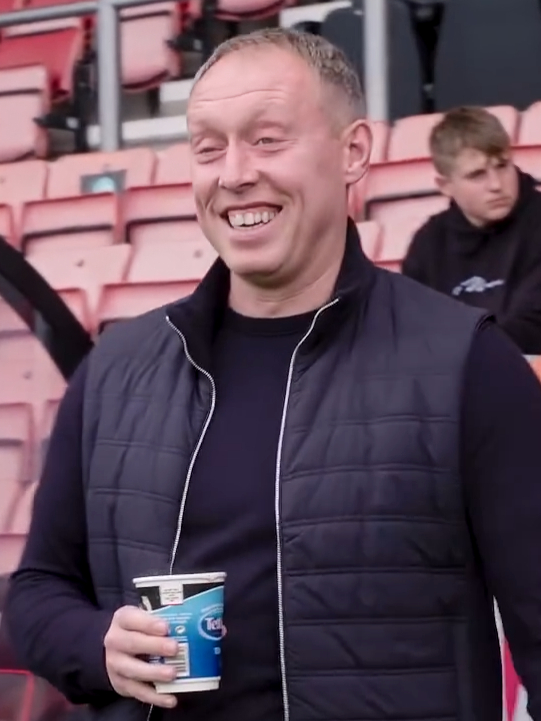
Steve Cooper started his brief playing career with Wrexham, making just two appearances.

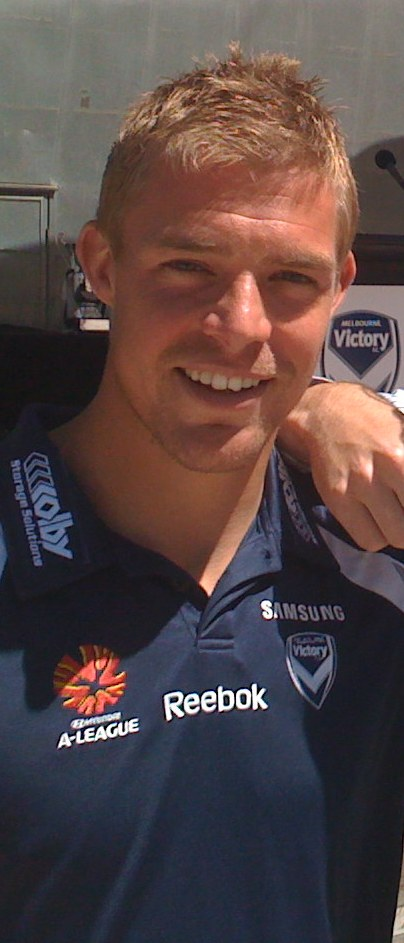
Danny Allsopp scored four goals in just three appearances at Wrexham.

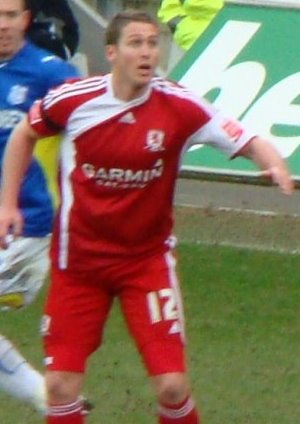
New Zealand striker Chris Killen made 14 appearances during a loan spell in 2000, scoring five goals.

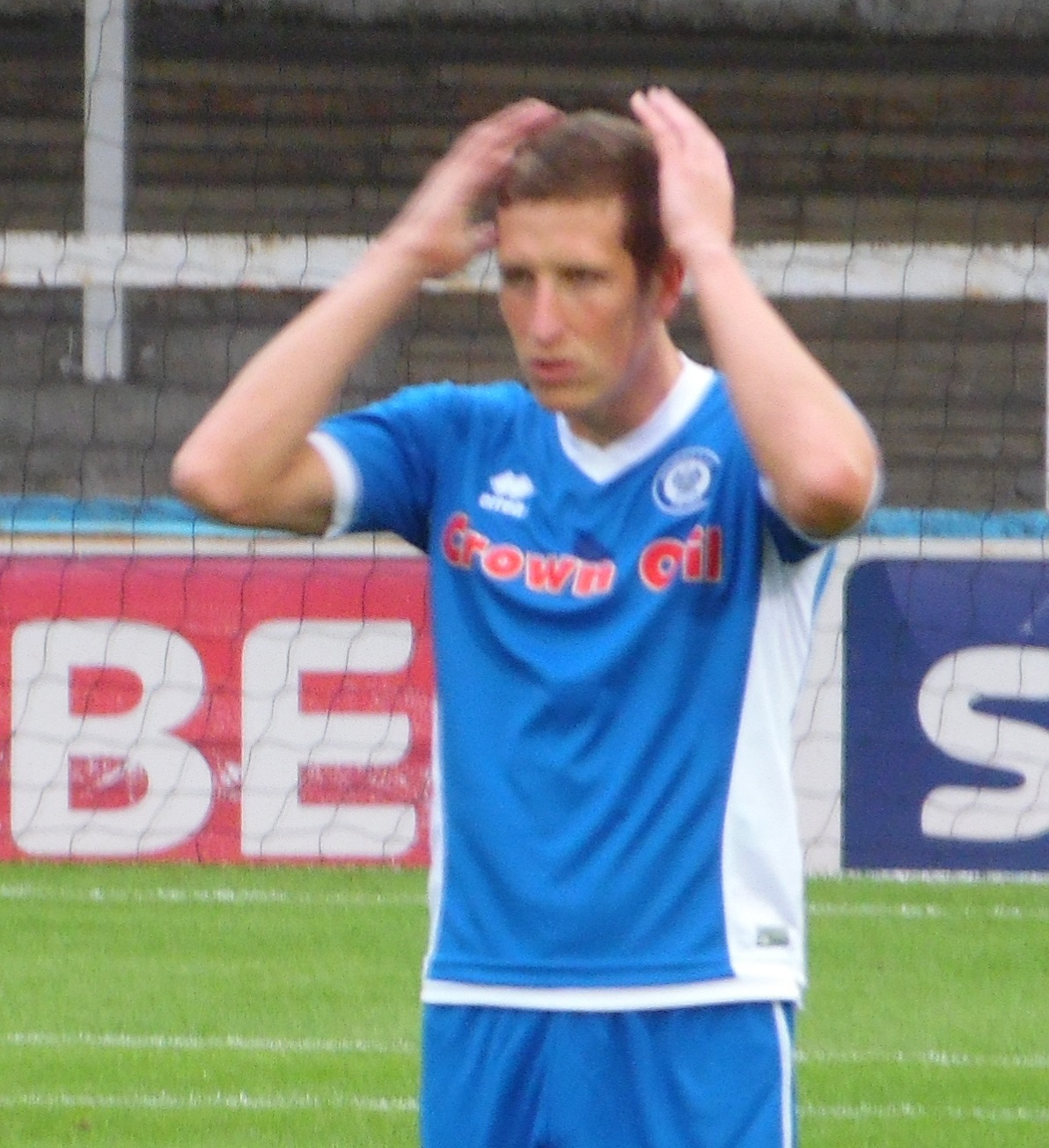
Jimmy McNulty made just one appearances for Wrexham's first team.

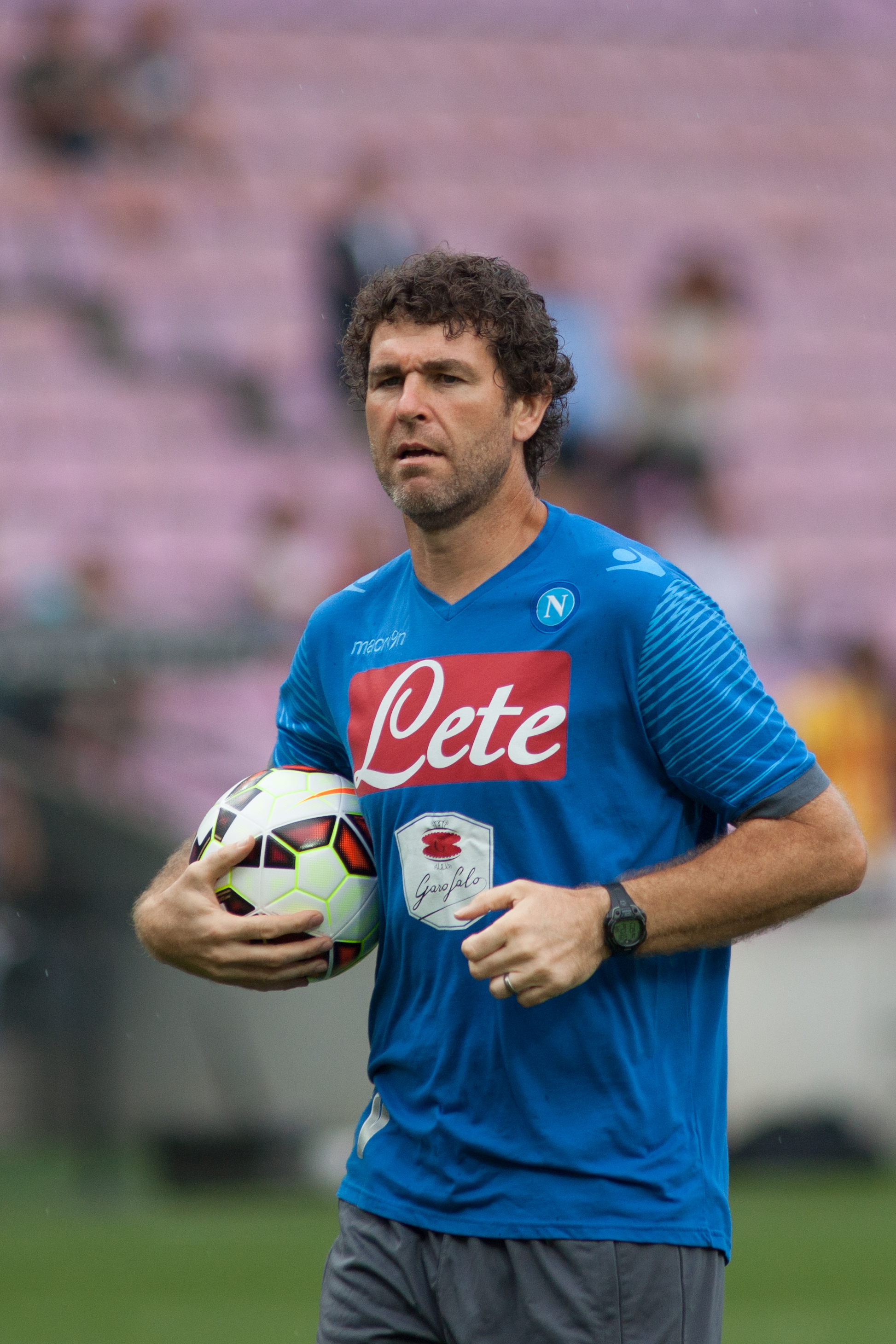
Xavi Valero is one of only two Spanish players to appear for Wrexham, making four appearances for the club in 2005.

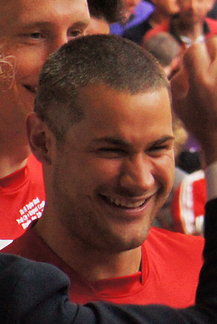
Jamie Reed played nine times for Wrexham, all as a substitute.

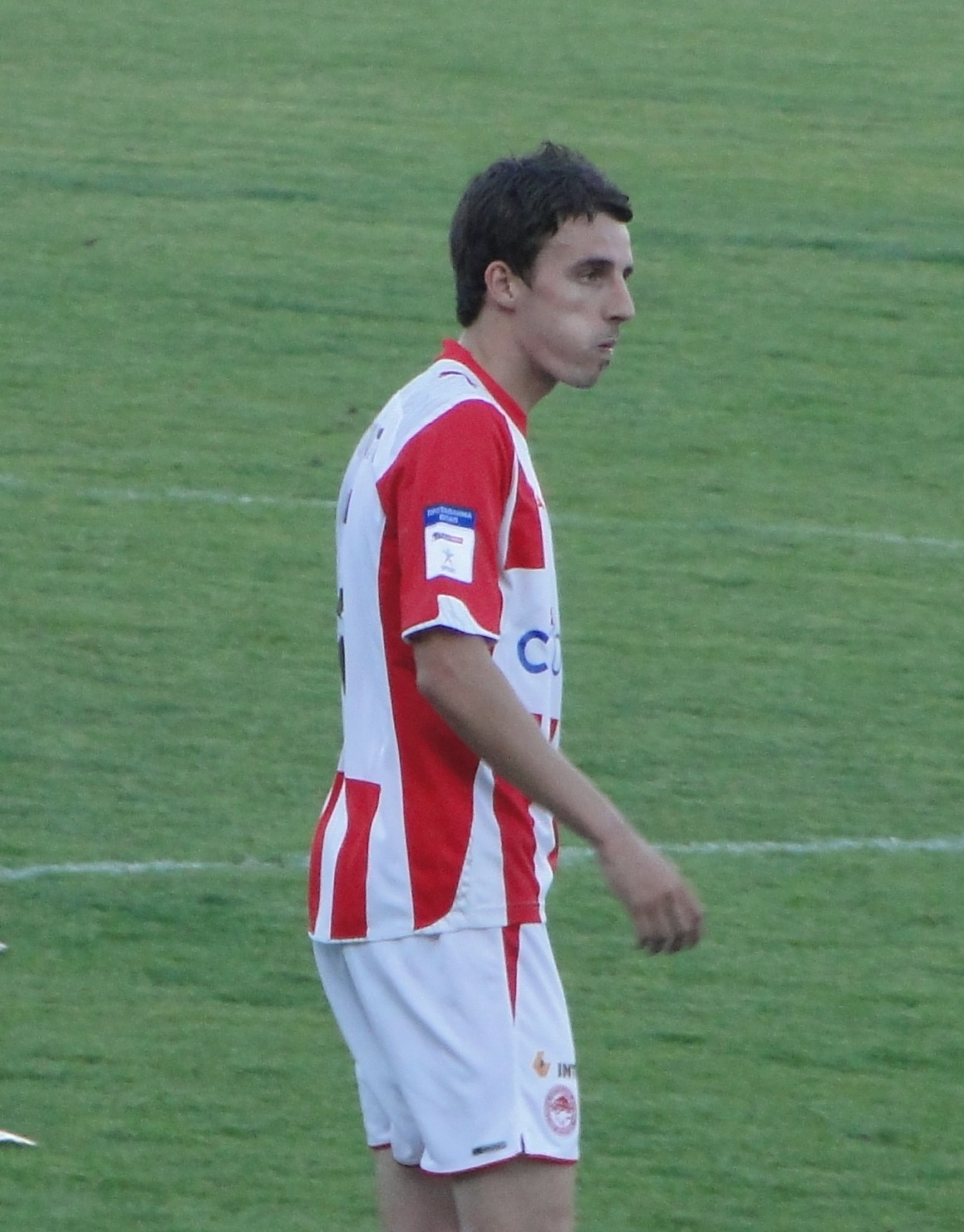
Matt Derbyshire scored ten times in 17 appearances for Wrexham.

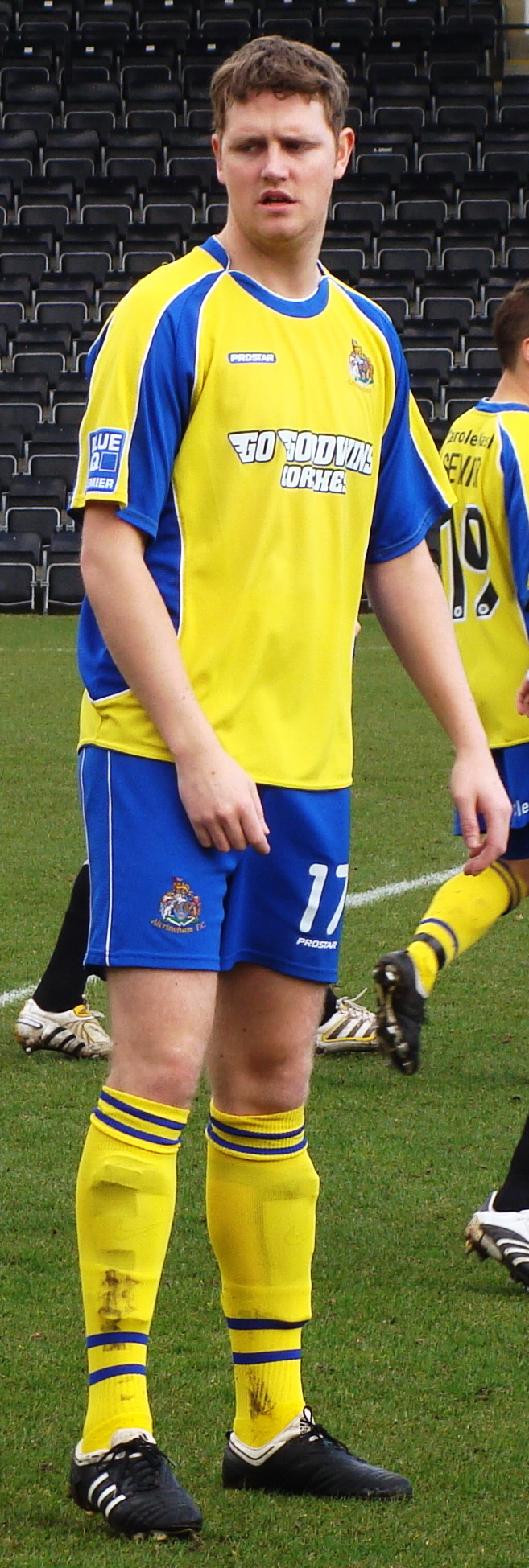
John McAliskey made 3 appearances on loan for Wrexham in 2006.

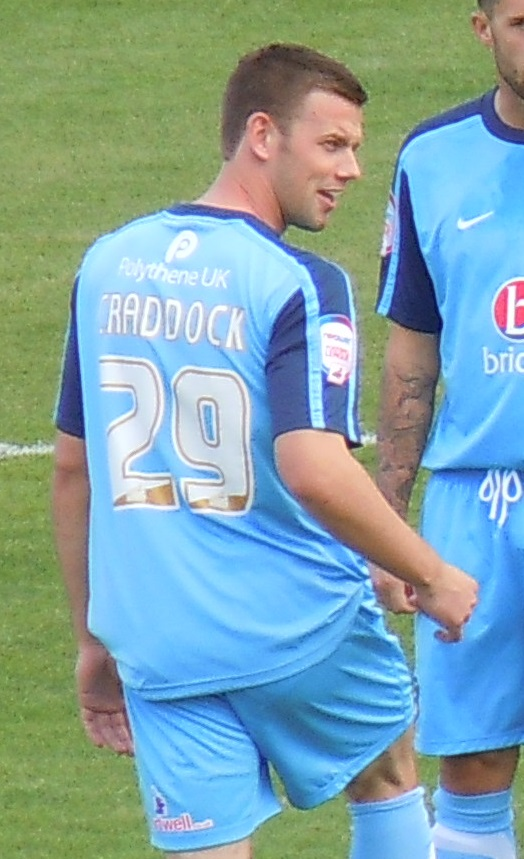
Tom Craddock scored on his only appearance for the Red Dragons.

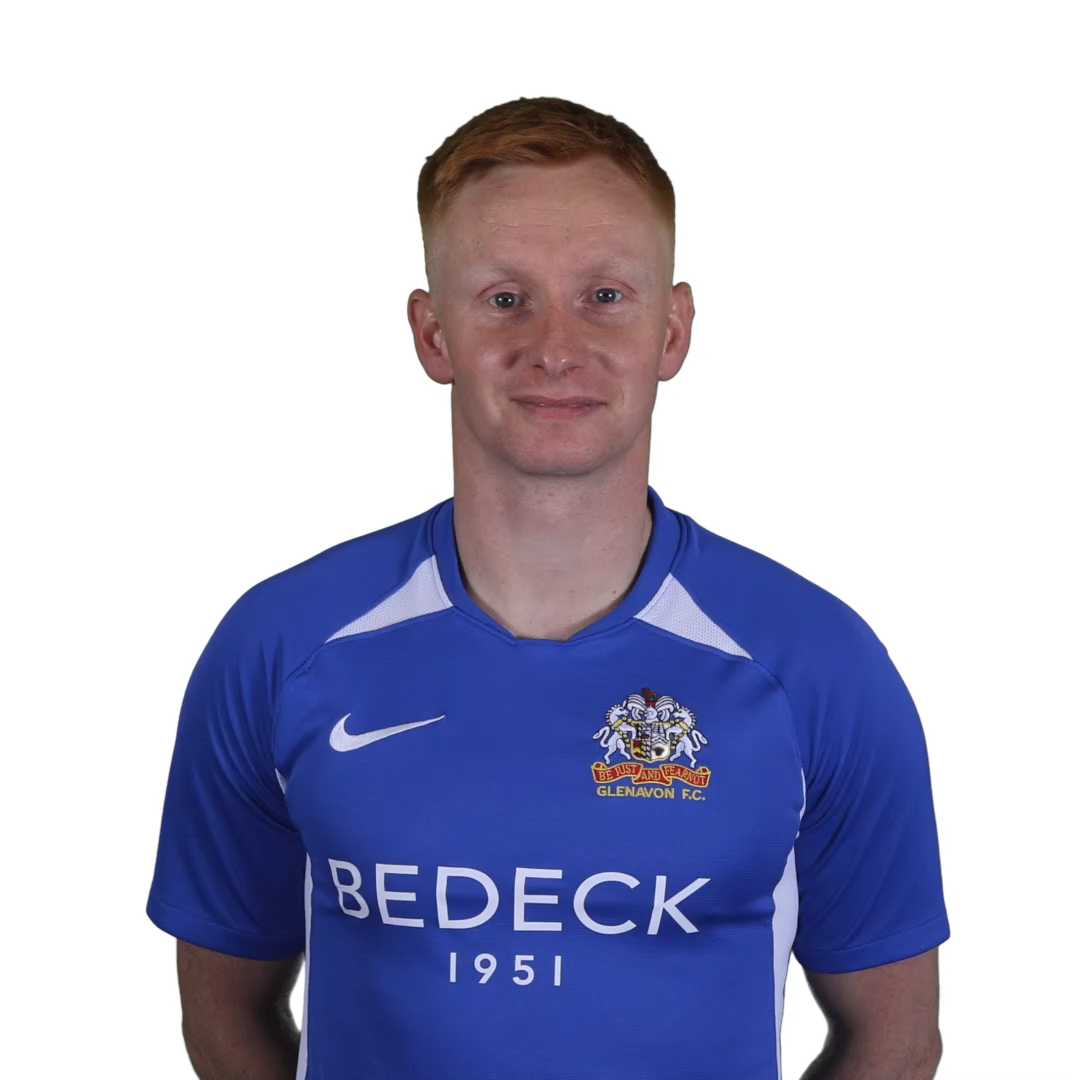
Robert Garrett played 23 times for Wrexham during two consecutive loan spells.

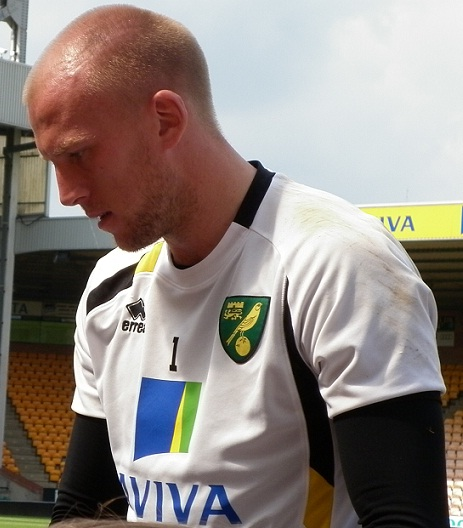
John Ruddy appeared in five games for Wrexham during the 2006–07 season.

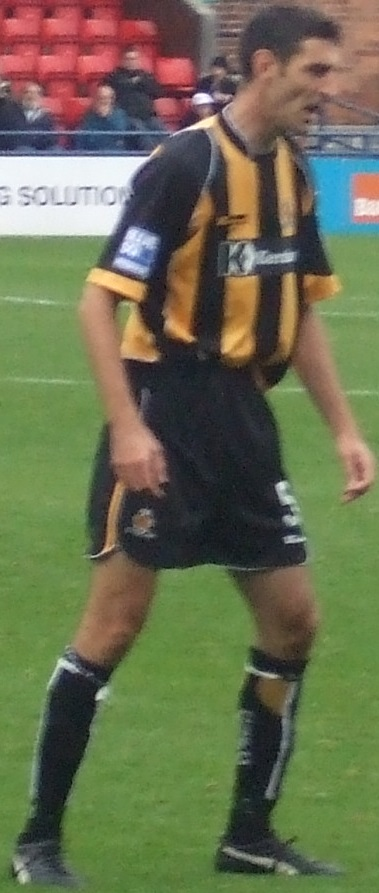
Phil Bolland played 19 times before being released upon the club's relegation to the Conference.

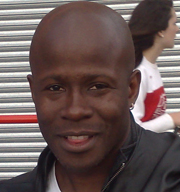
During a six-month loan spell, Paul Hall made 11 appearances and scored one goal.

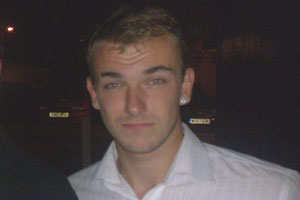
Stuart Nicholson made 13 appearances on loan in 2008.

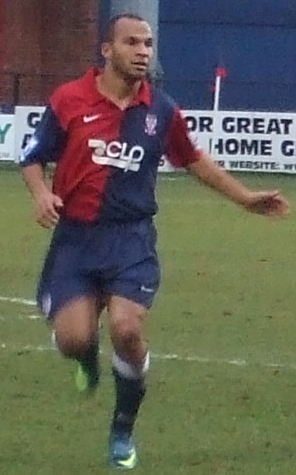
Simon Brown scored twice in 15 appearances for Wrexham.

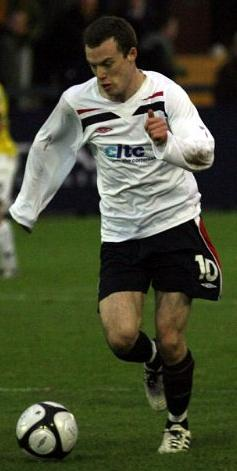
Shaun Whalley made 16 appearances for Wrexham in the 2008–09 season.

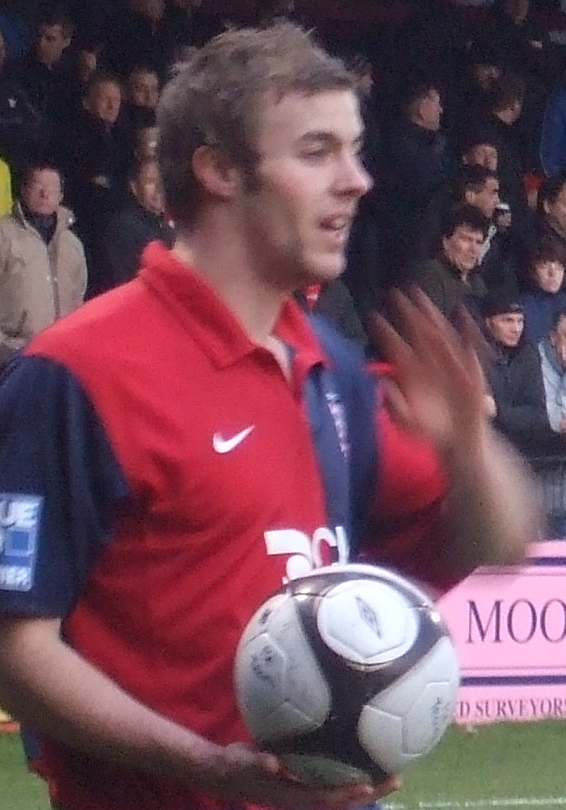
Kyle Critchell made 2 appearances for Wrexham in 2008.

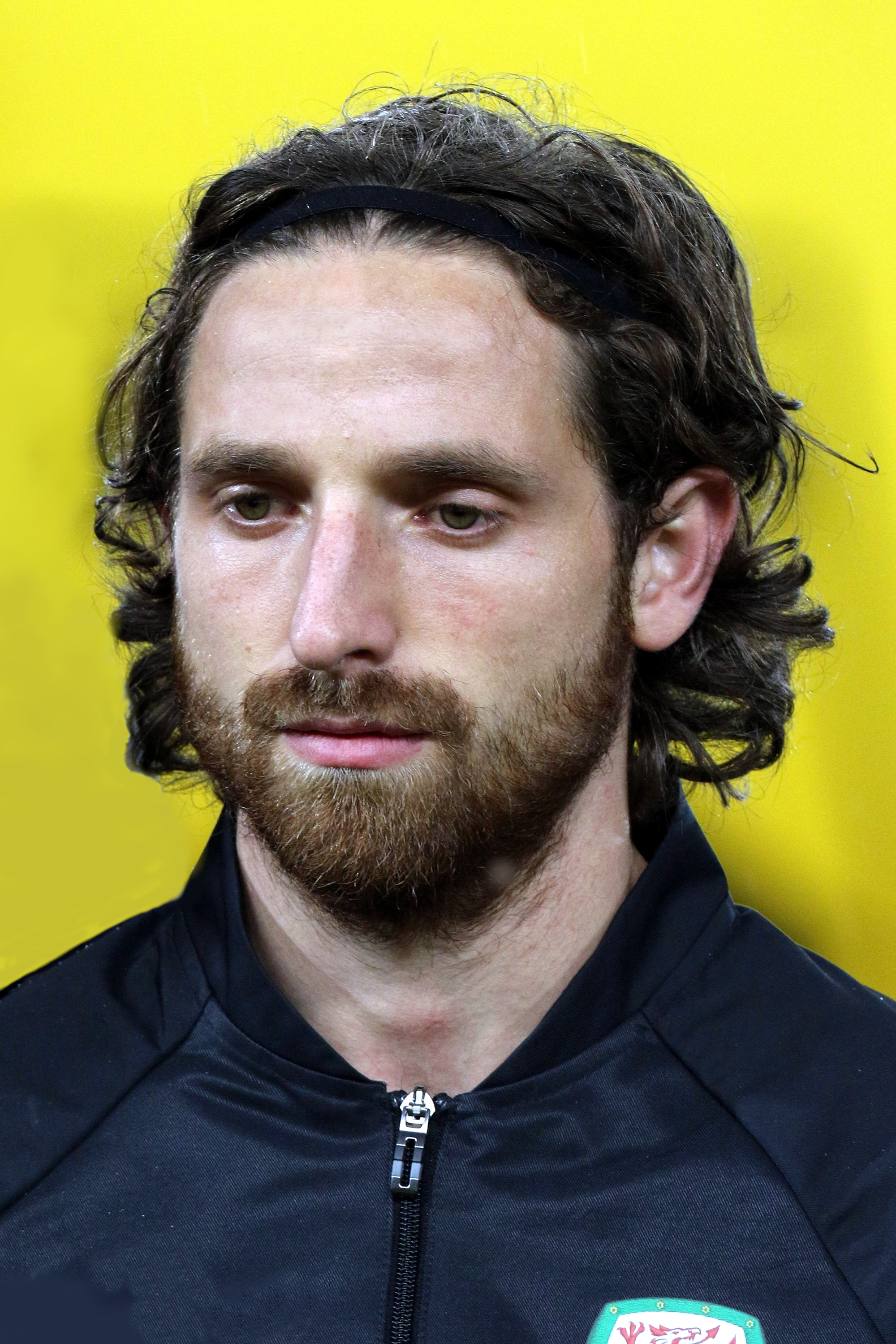
Welsh international Joe Allen made 2 appearances for Wrexham on loan in 2008.

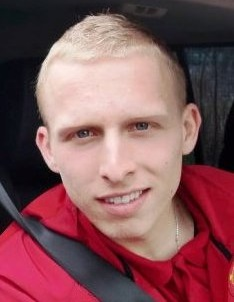
Belgian international Ritchie De Laet made 4 appearances on loan in 2008

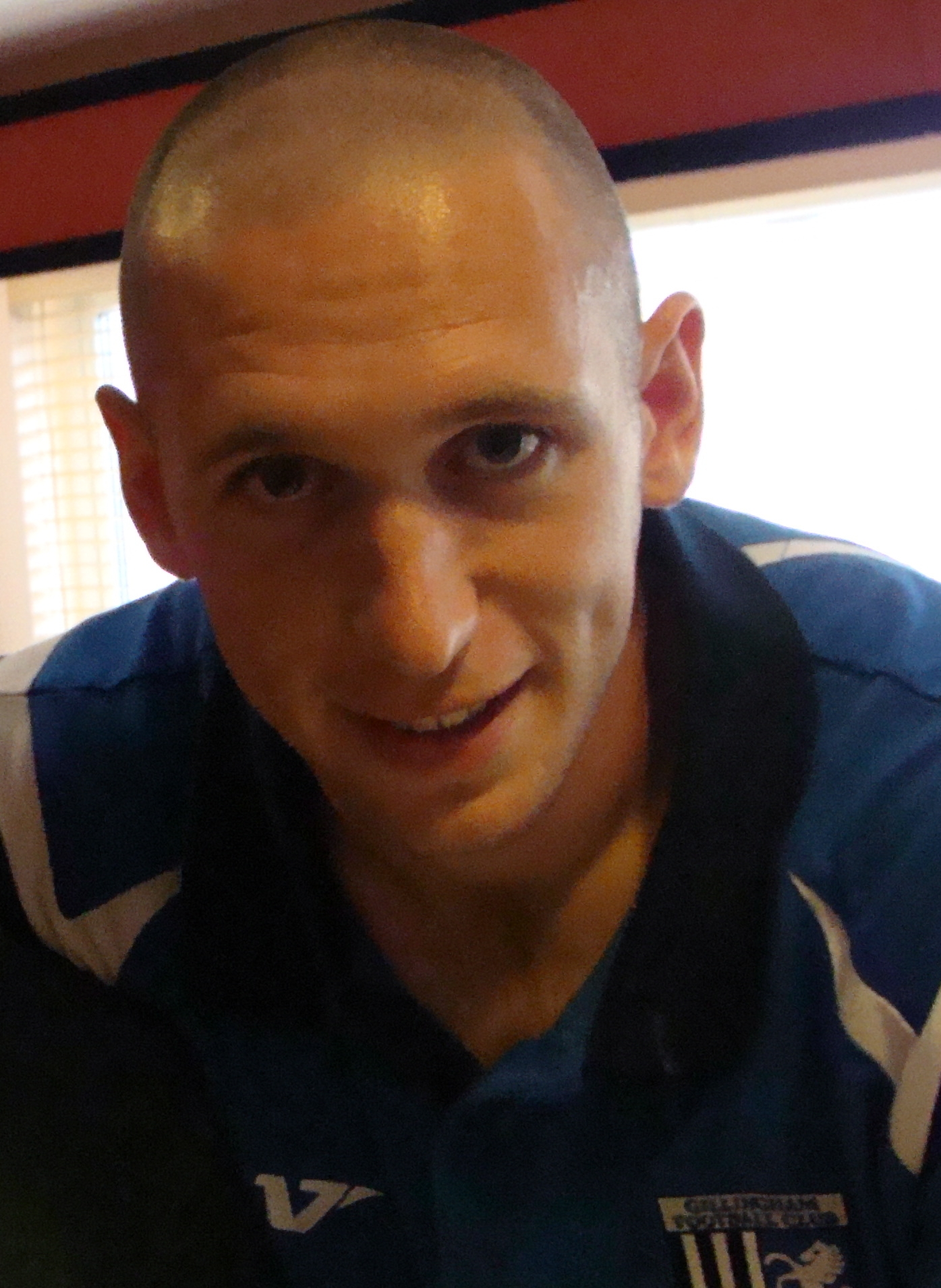
Andrew Crofts made 18 appearances on loan for Wrexham, scoring 1 goal.

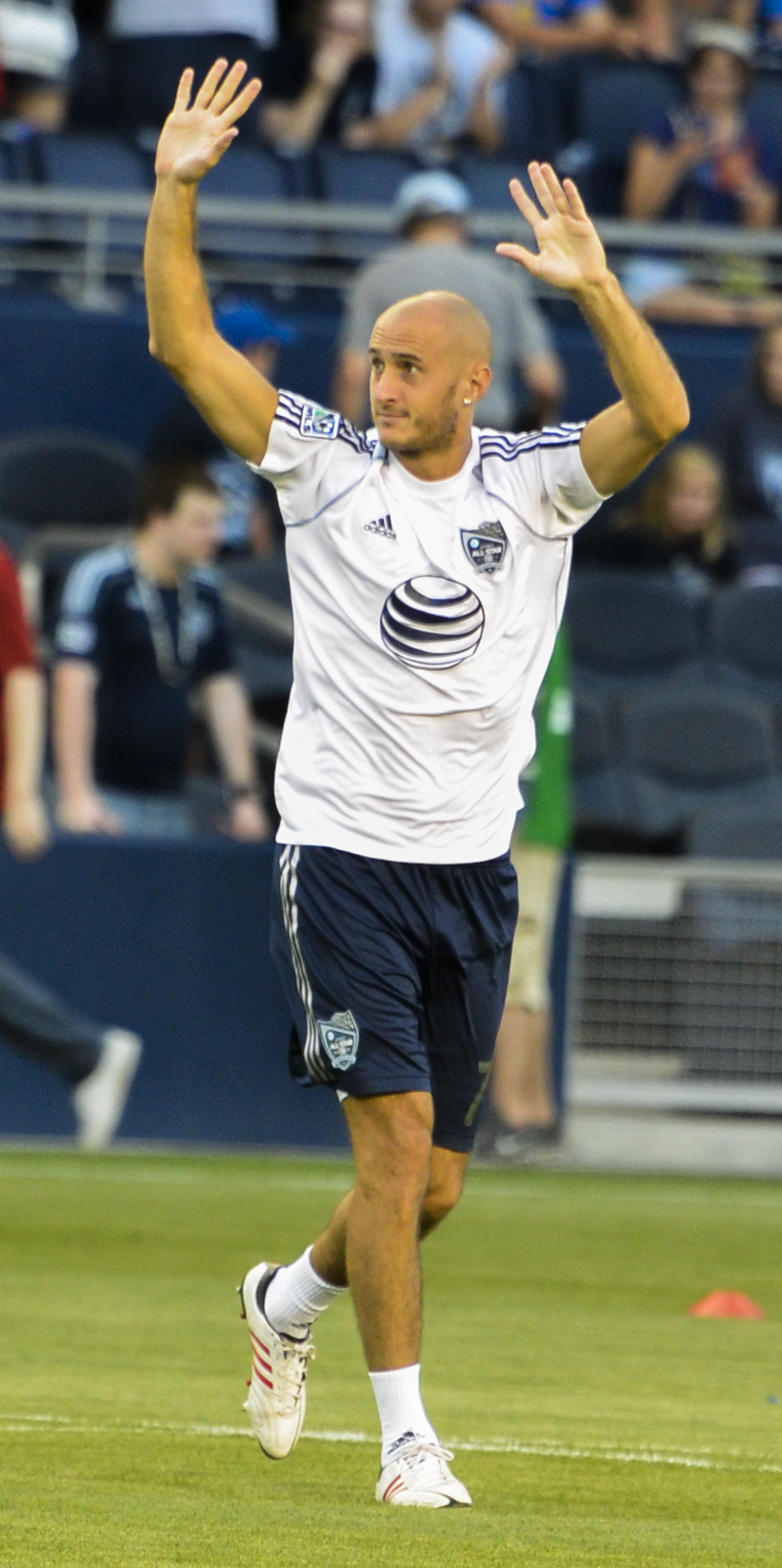
Aurélien Collin made 13 appearances for Wrexham in 2009.

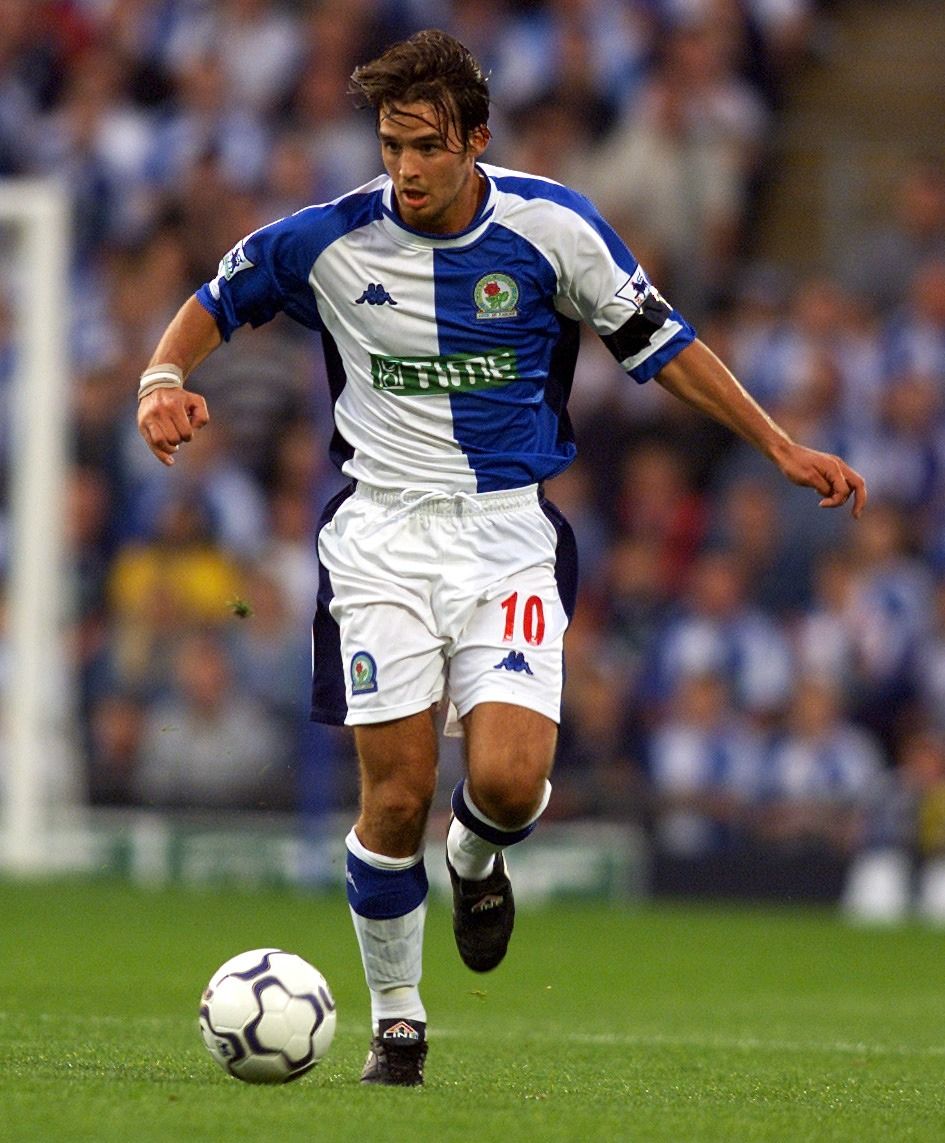
Matt Jansen made 3 appearances for Wrexham, scoring 1 goal.

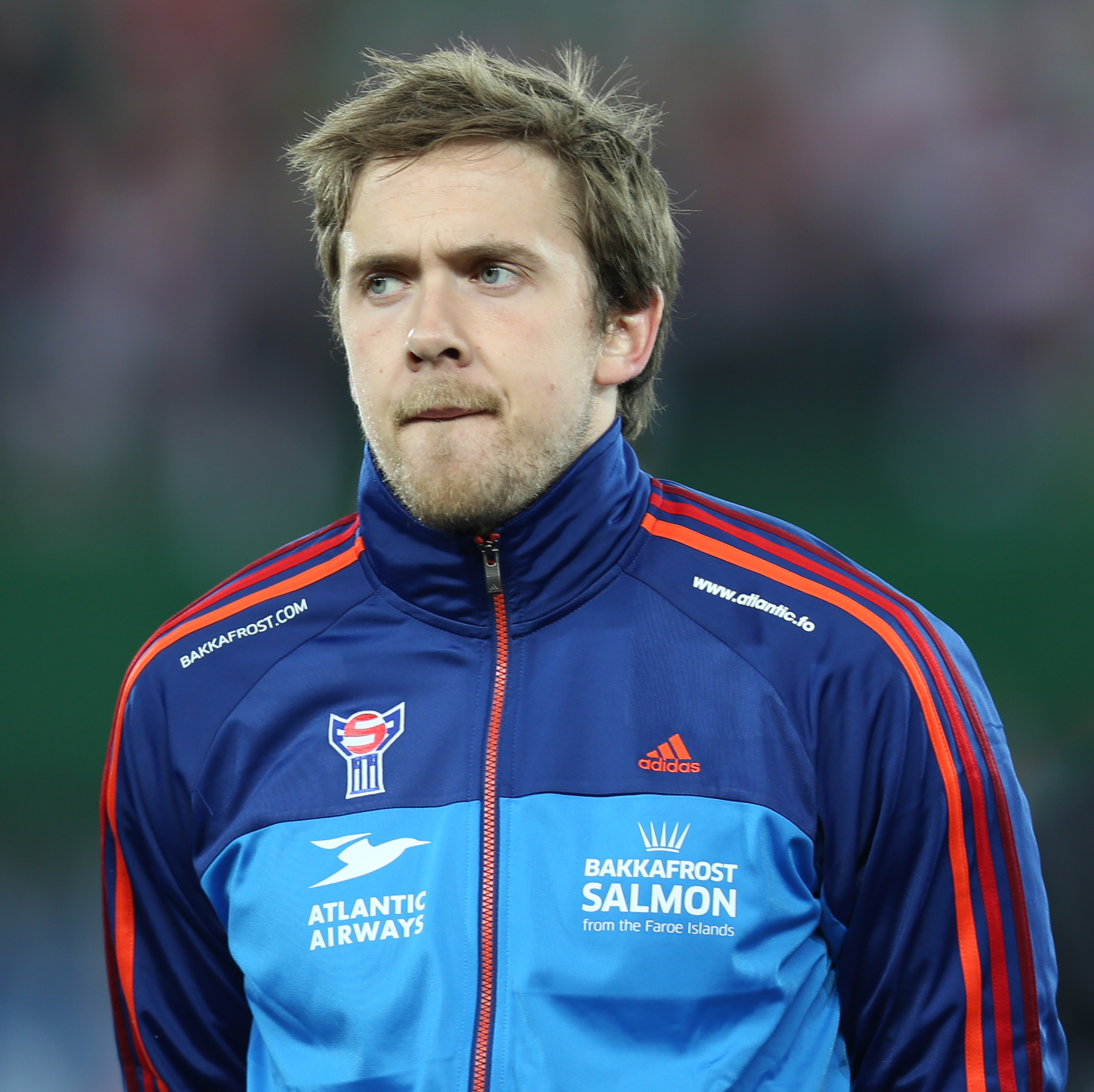
Faroese international goalkeeper Gunnar Nielsen made 5 appearances on loan at Wrexham.

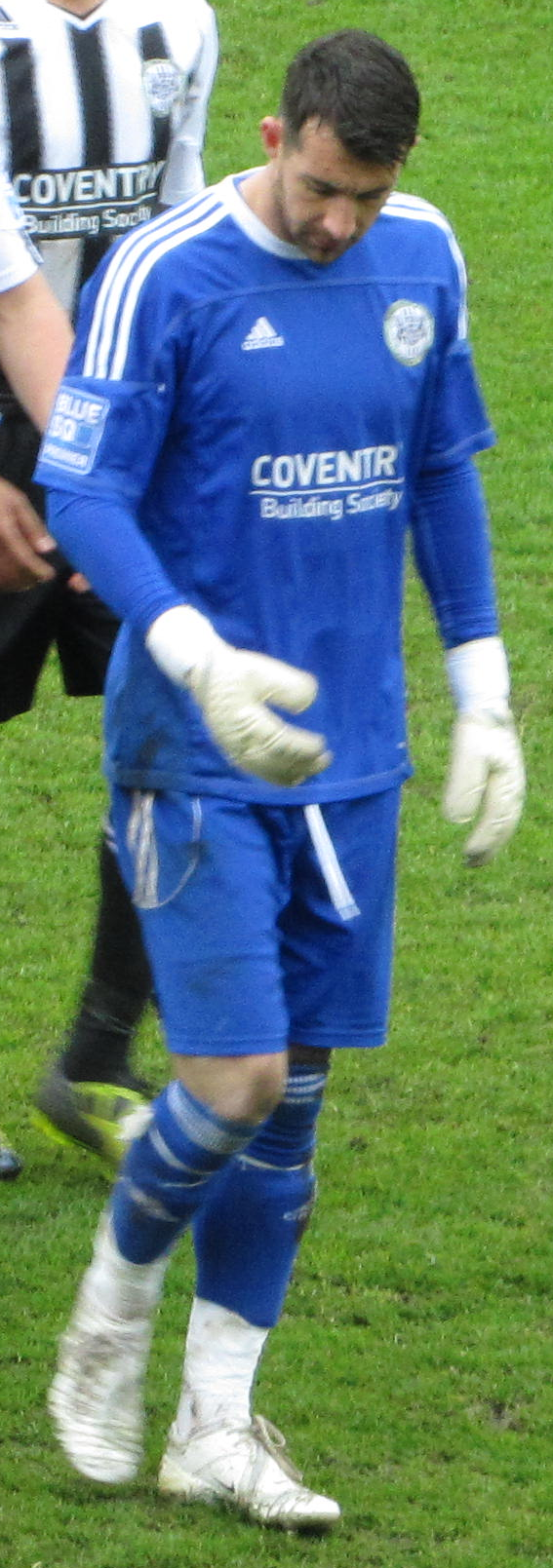
Goalkeeper Sam Russell made 20 appearances for Wrexham.

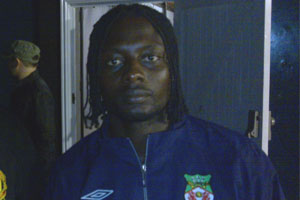
Senegalese international Lamine Sakho made 21 appearances for Wrexham between 2009 and 2010.

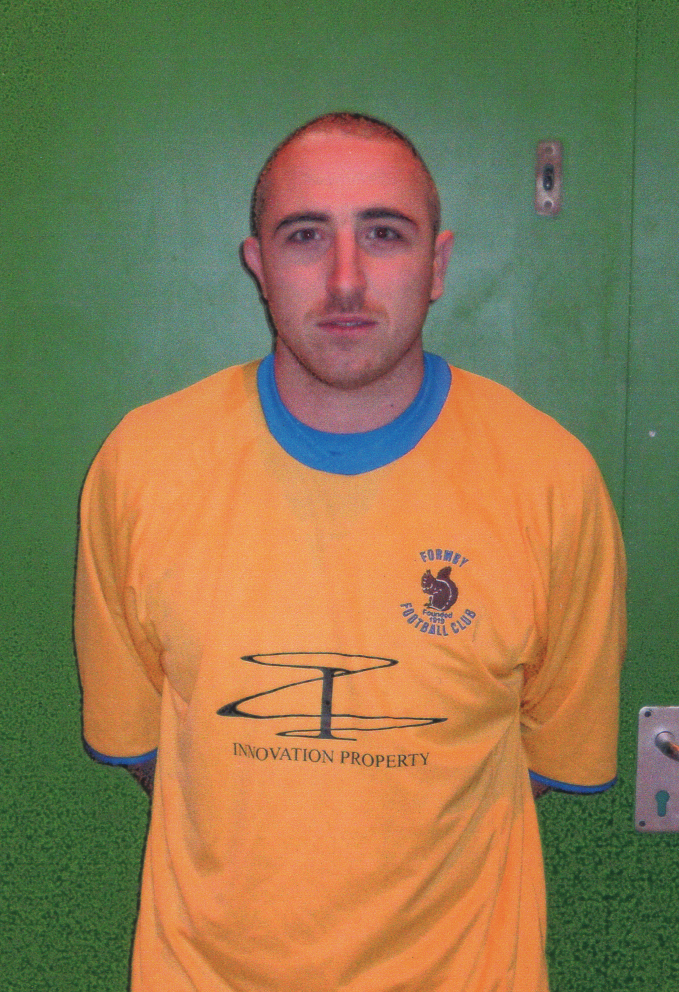
Luke Holden played 15 times on loan for Wrexham.

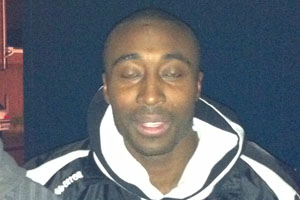
Aaron Brown played for Wrexham 8 times in 2010.

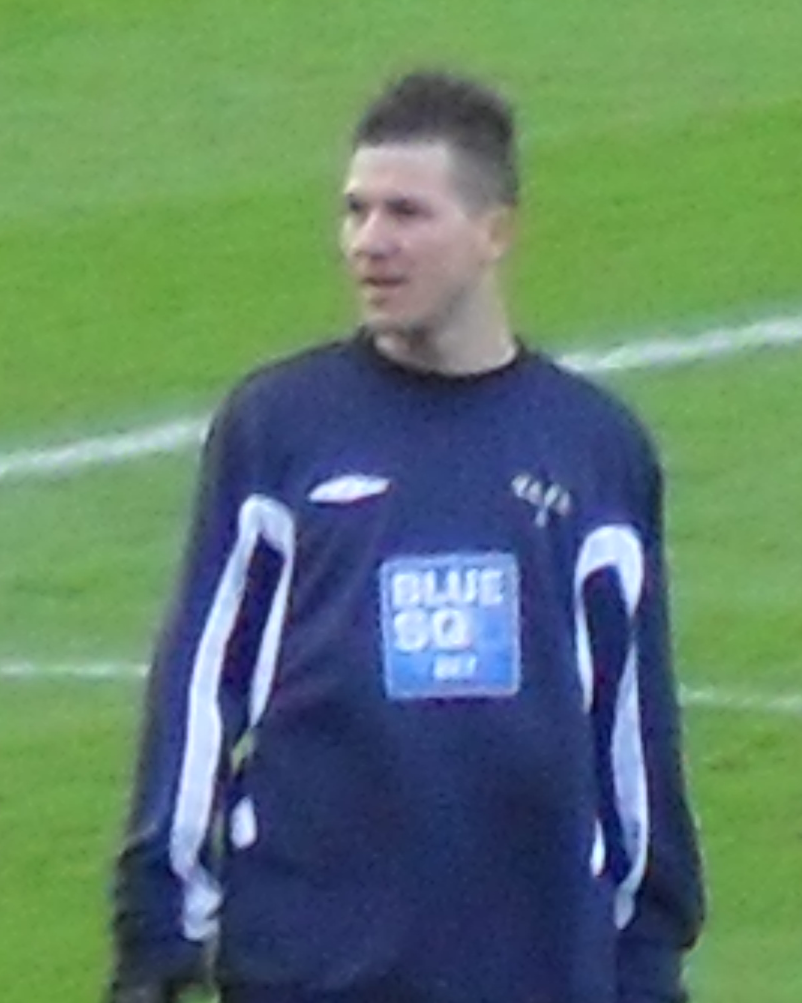
Kevin Gall played 5 times for Wrexham during the 2010–11 season.

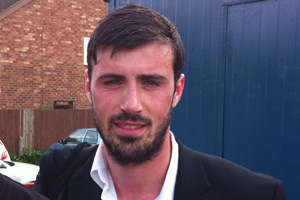
Scott Shearer played 9 times in goal for Wrexham.

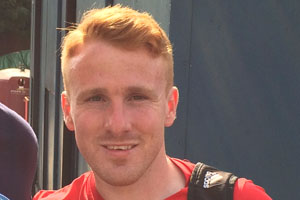
Kevin Thornton made 21 appearances for the Red Dragons.

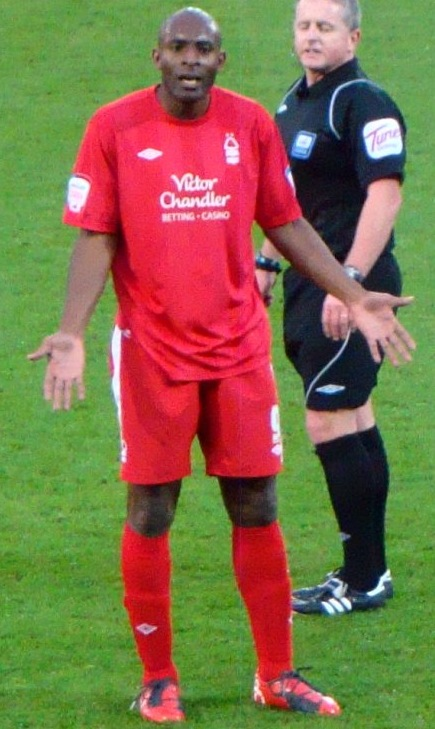
Dele Adebola scored twice in 16 appearances on loan.

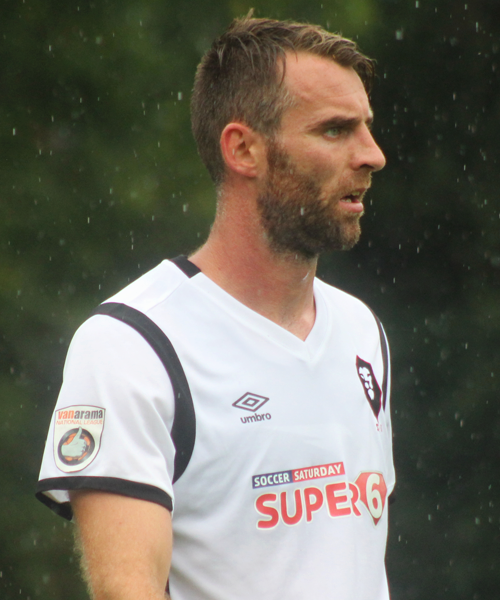
Danny Livesey made 16 loan appearances in 2016.

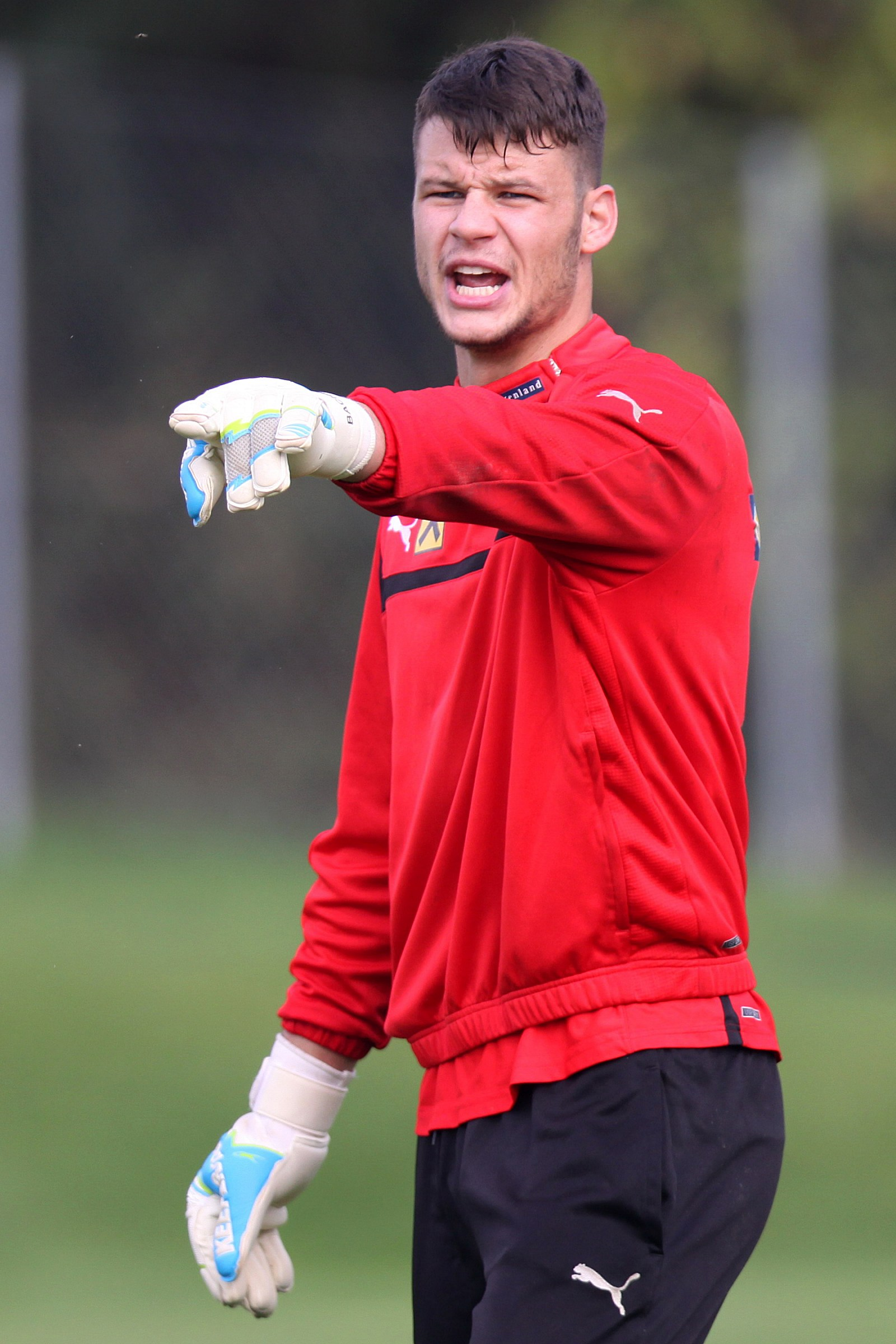
Austrian international Daniel Bachmann made his first senior appearances whilst on loan at Wrexham

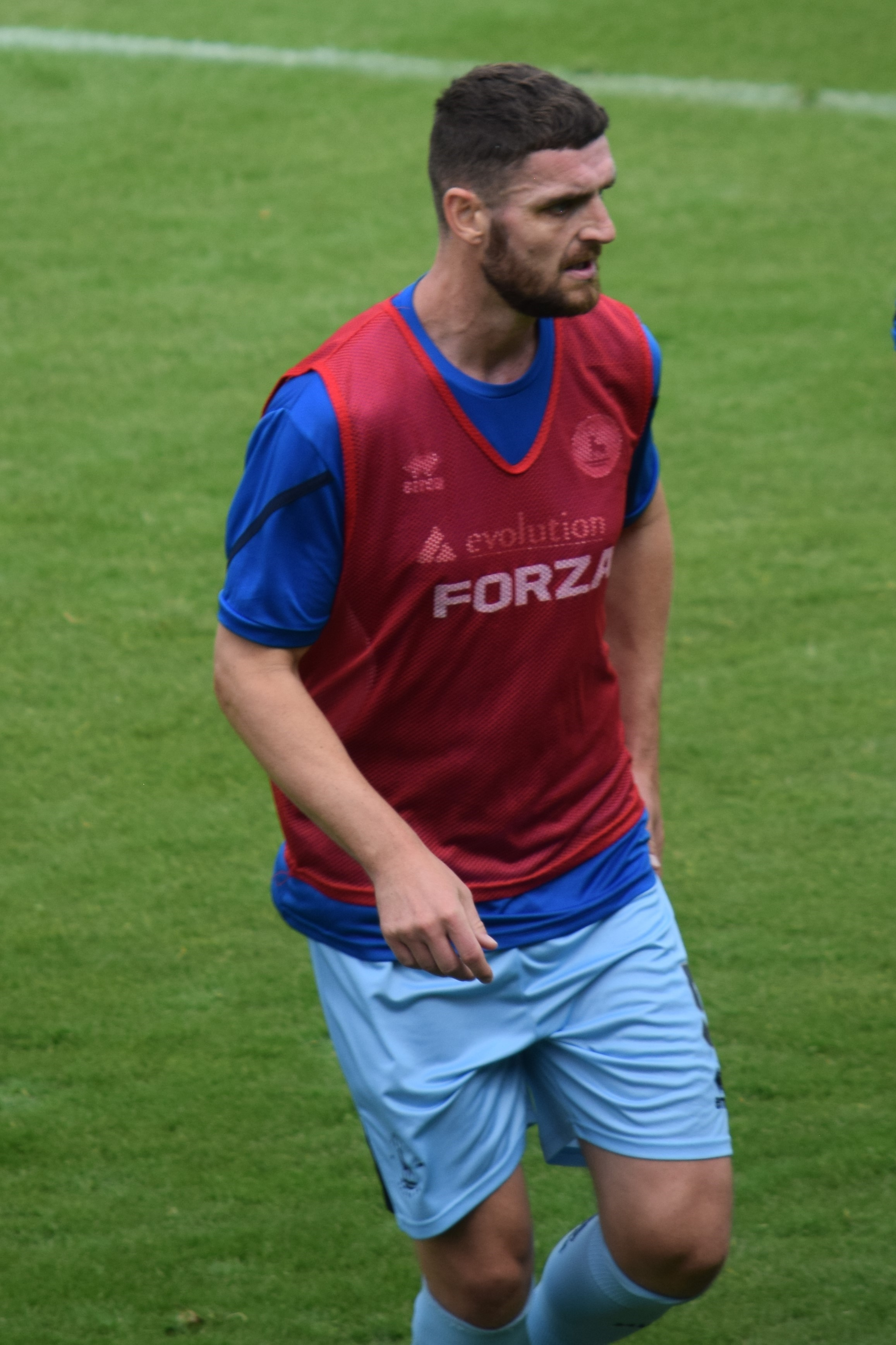
Luke Waterfall played for Wrexham 14 times in 2015.

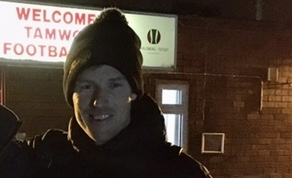
Kyle Storer played for Wrexham 13 times in 2015.

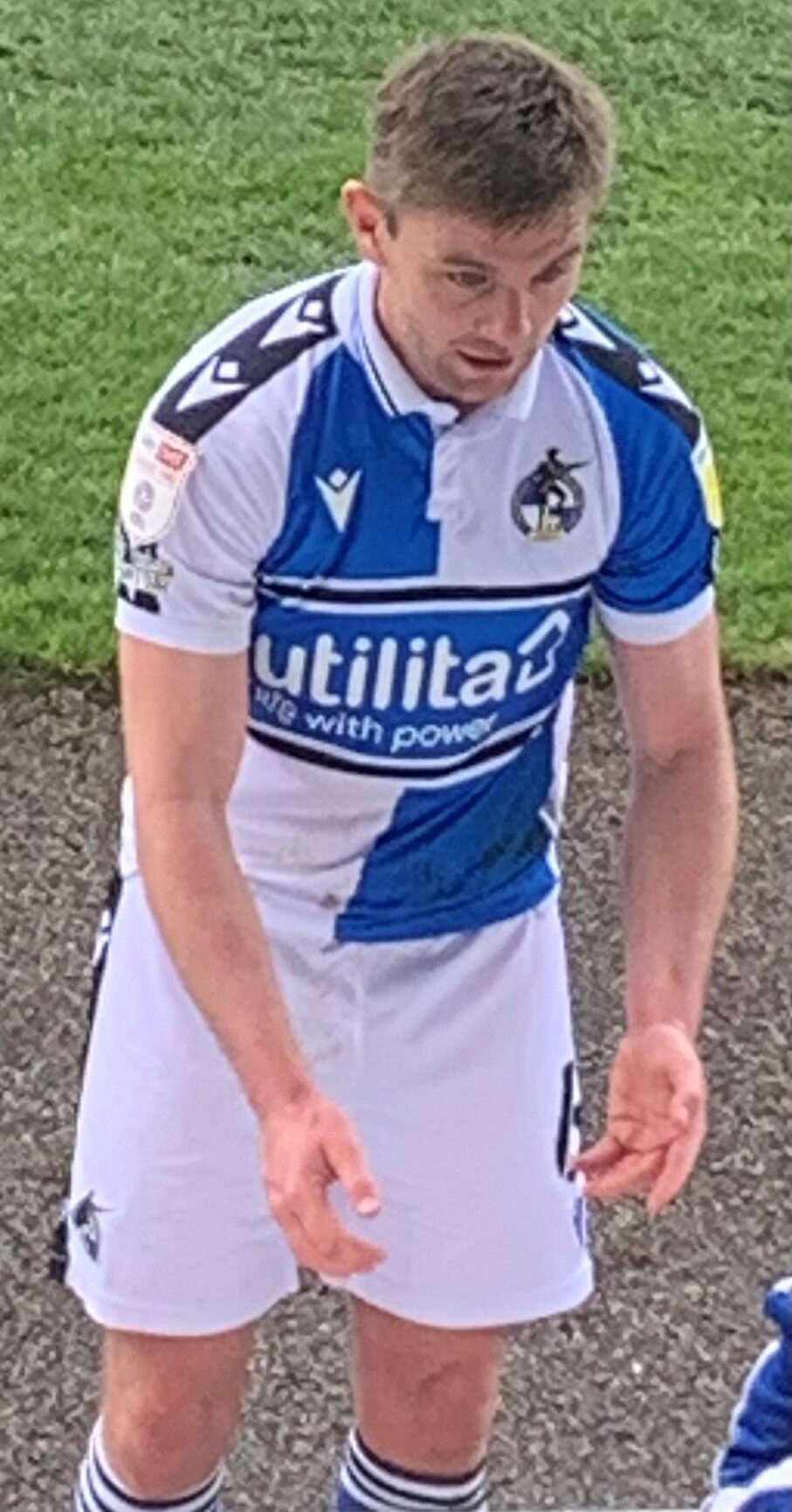
Sam Finley made 14 loan appearances for Wrexham in 2015.

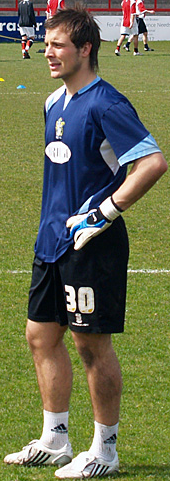
Cameron Belford played 20 times for Wrexham as a goalkeeper.

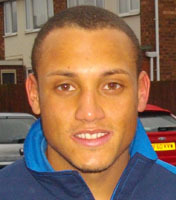
Adam Smith played 12 times in 2015.

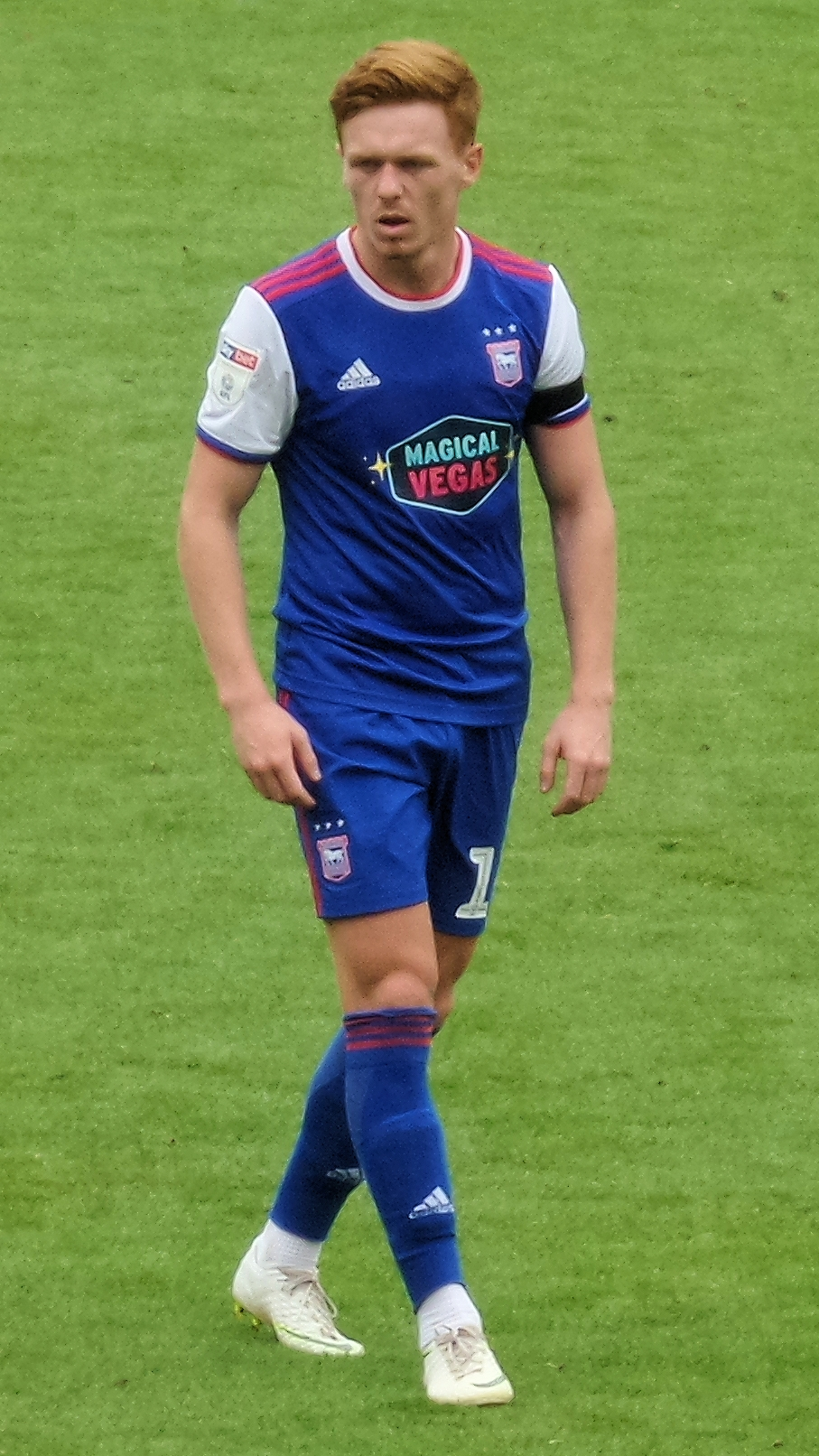
Jon Nolan played 6 times in his 2015–16 season loan spell.

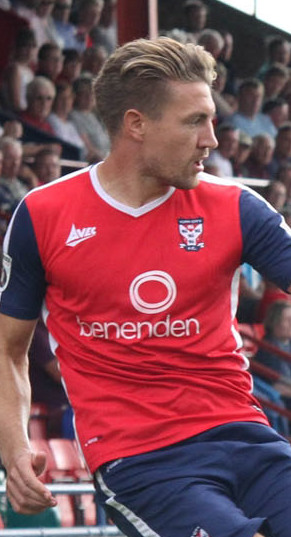
Simon Heslop made 20 appearances in 2016, scoring 3 times.

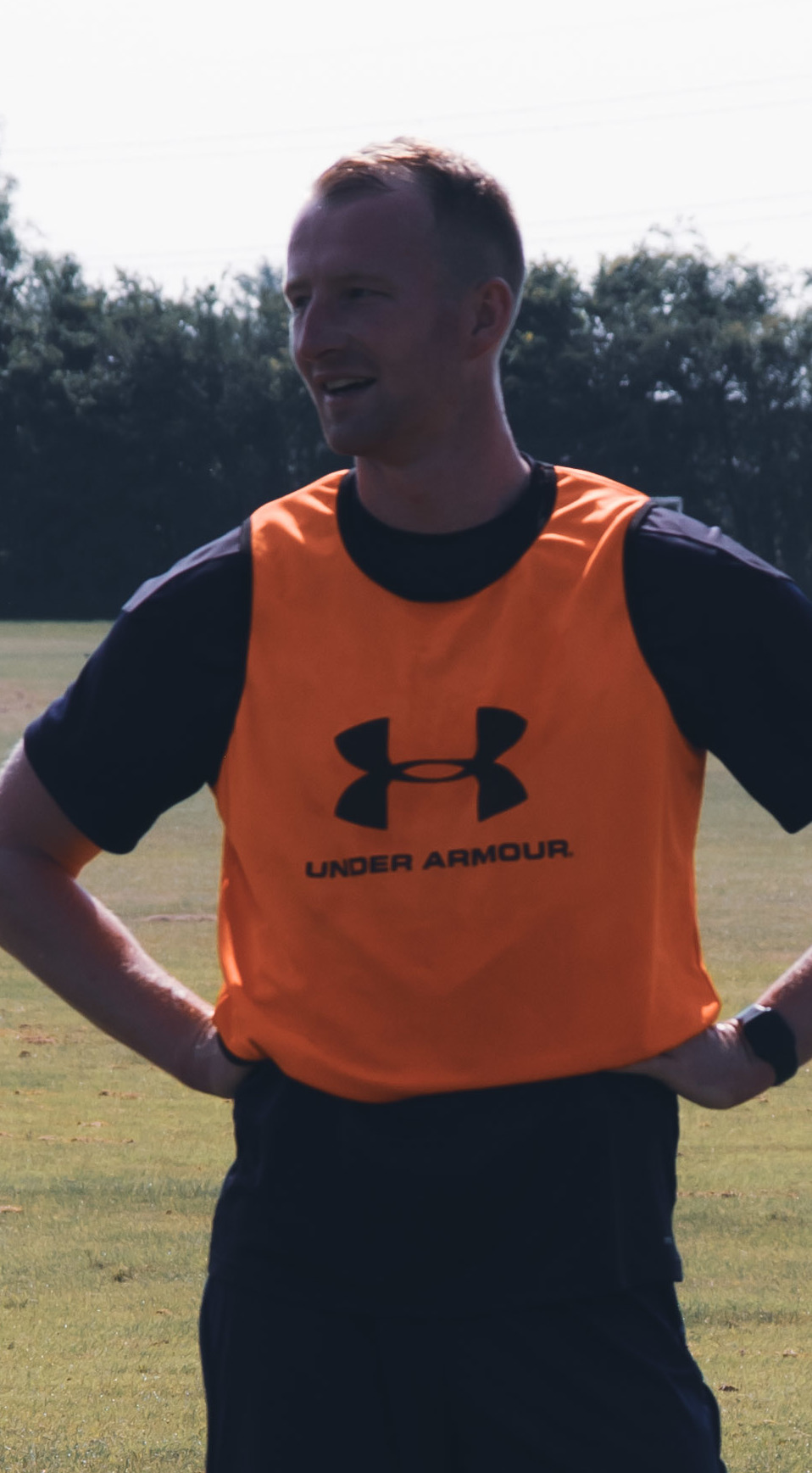
Mark Beck made 11 appearances on loan in 2016.

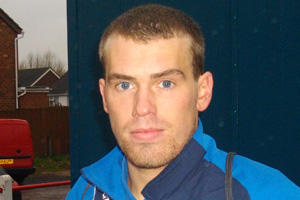
Louis Briscoe made 4 substitute appearances for Wrexham.

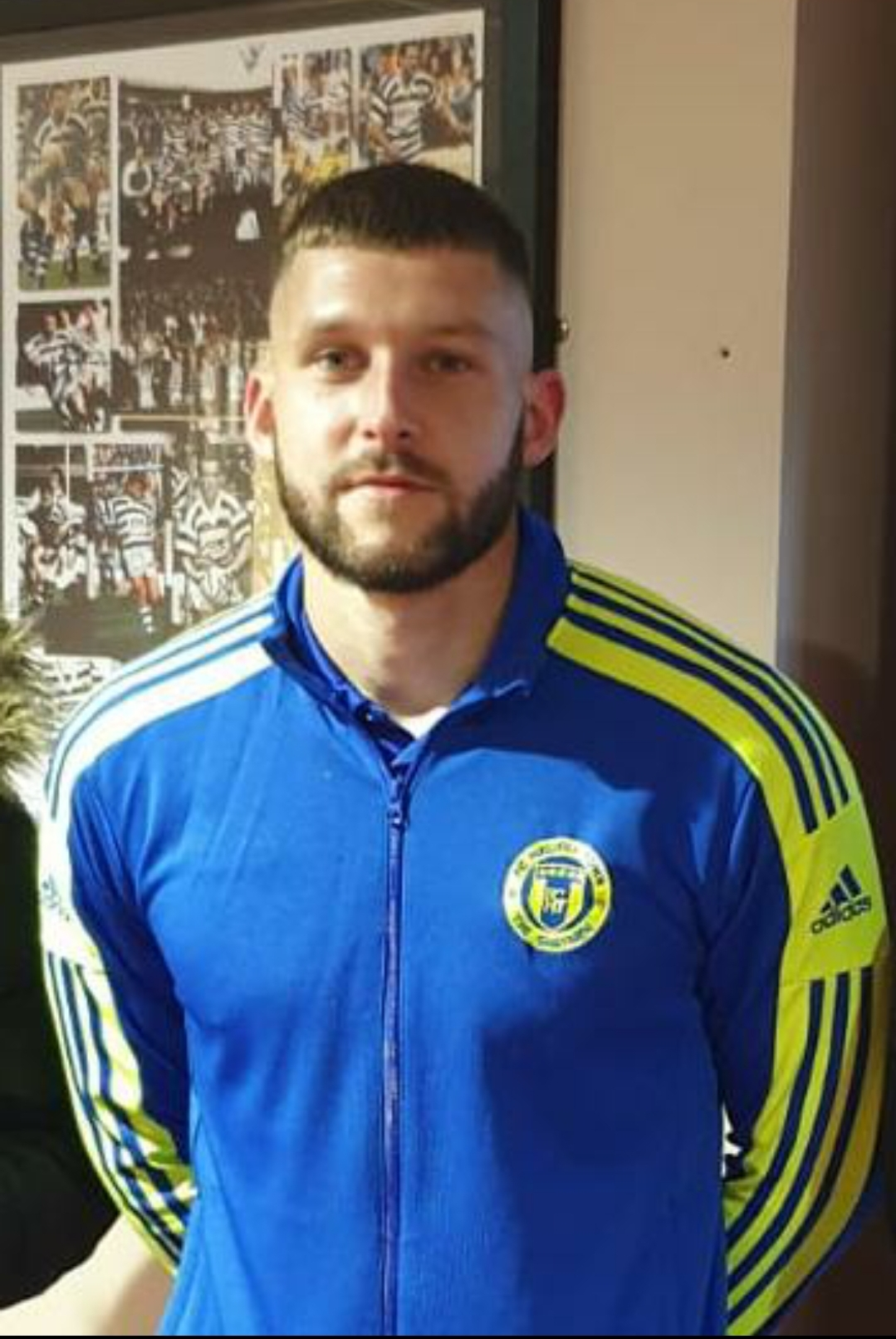
Gerry McDonagh made 24 appearances on loan in the 2016–17 season.

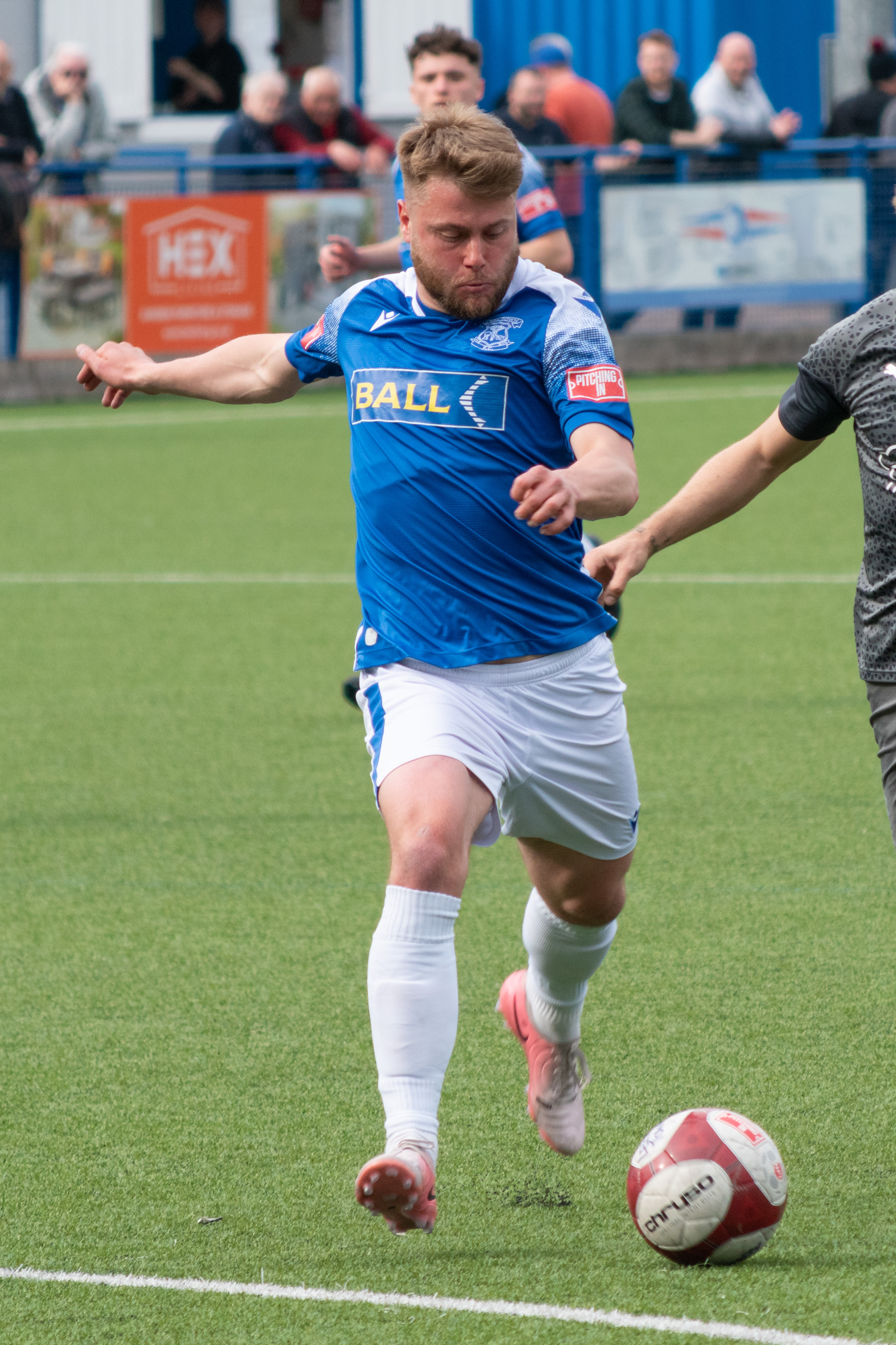
Ollie Shenton scored 1 goal in 17 appearances during his 2017 loan spell at Wrexham.

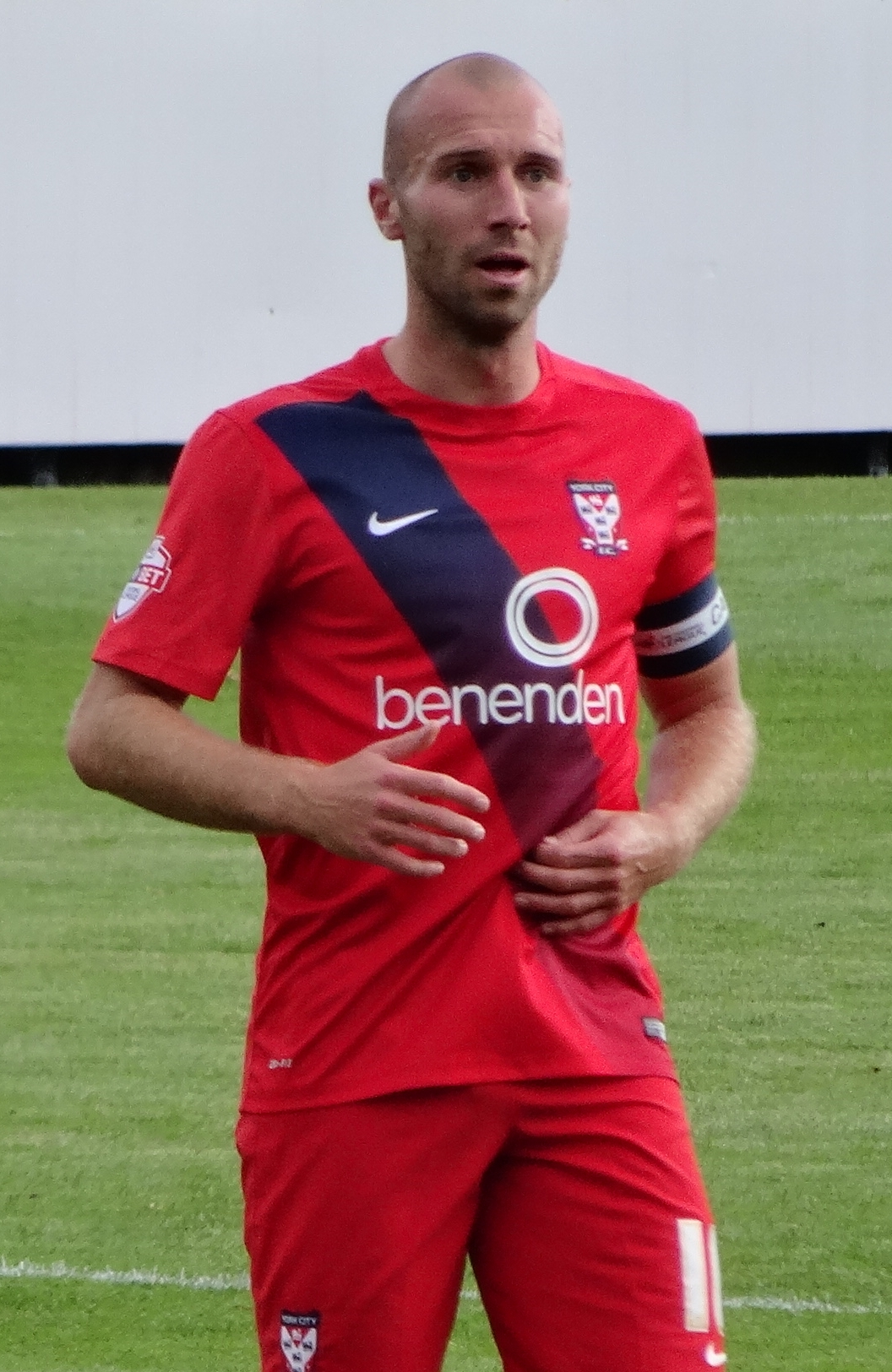
Russell Penn made 16 appearances for Wrexham in 2017.

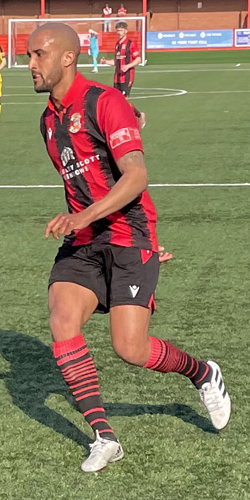
James Hurst made 19 appearances for Wrexham in the 2017–18 season.

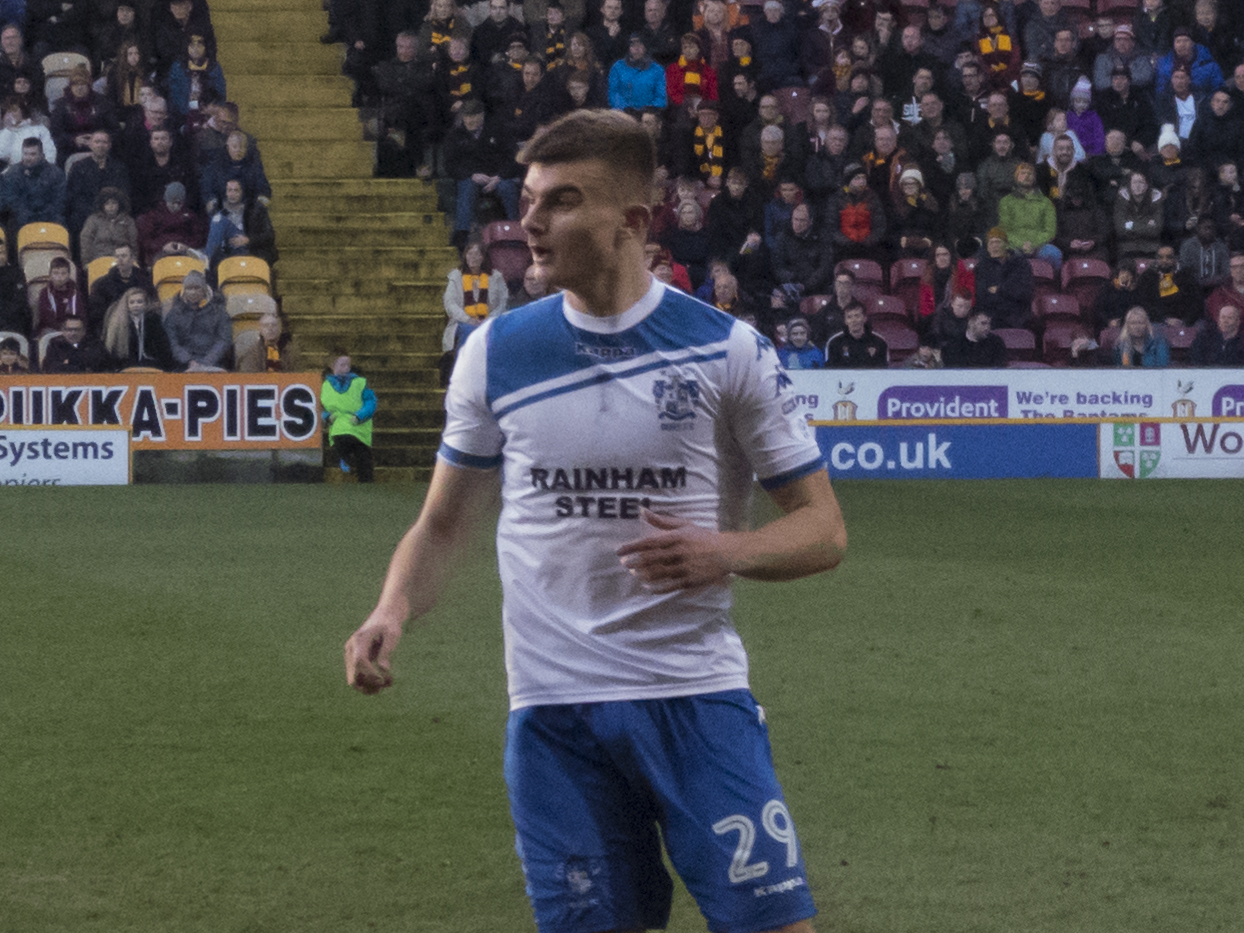
George Miller made 6 loan appearances for Wrexham

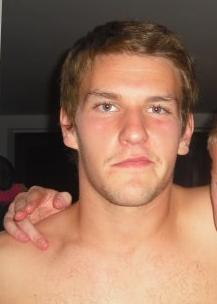
Simon Ainge made 10 appearances for Wrexham, with only 1 being a start.

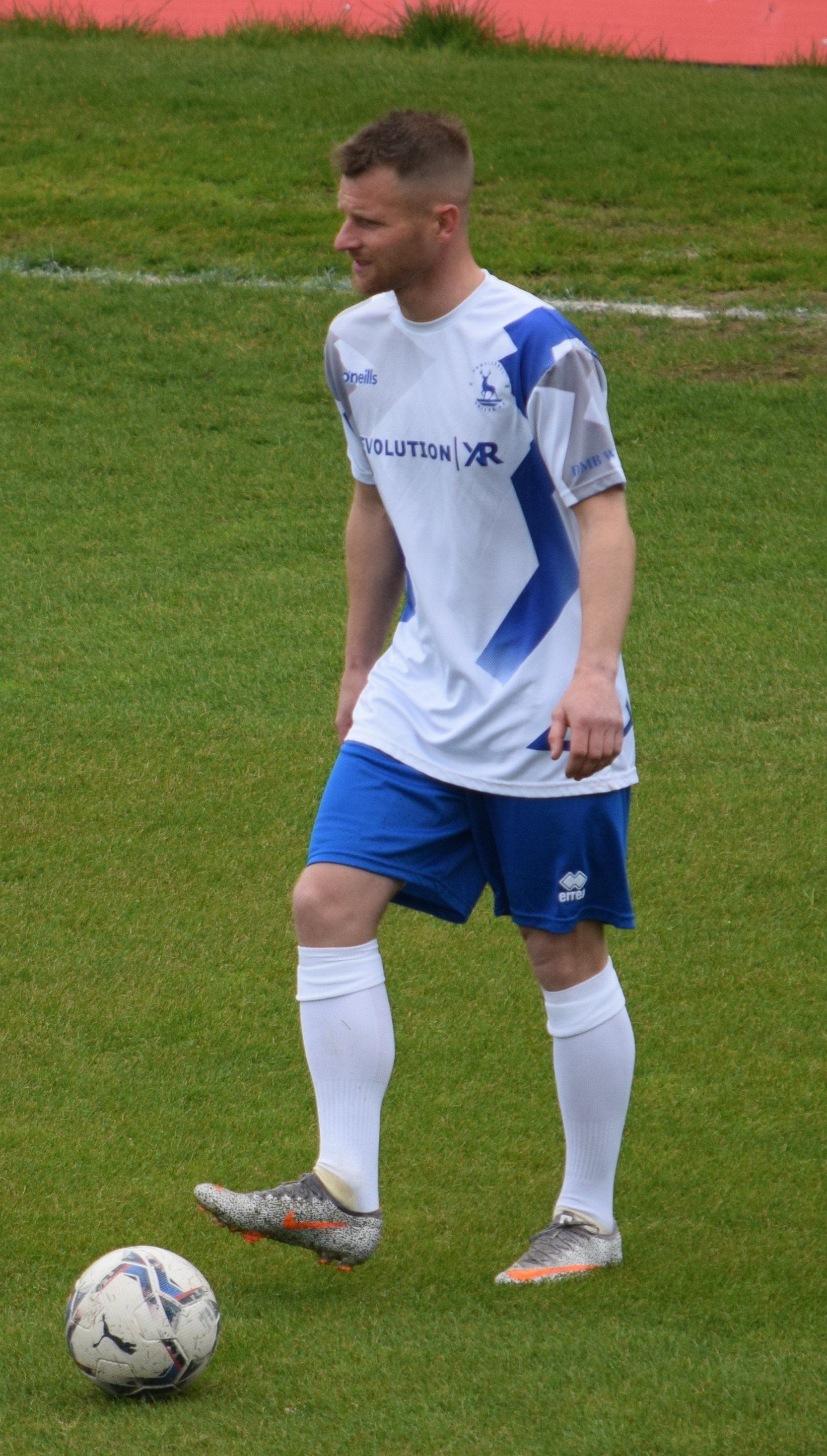
Jonathan Franks made 7 appearances for Wrexham in 2018.

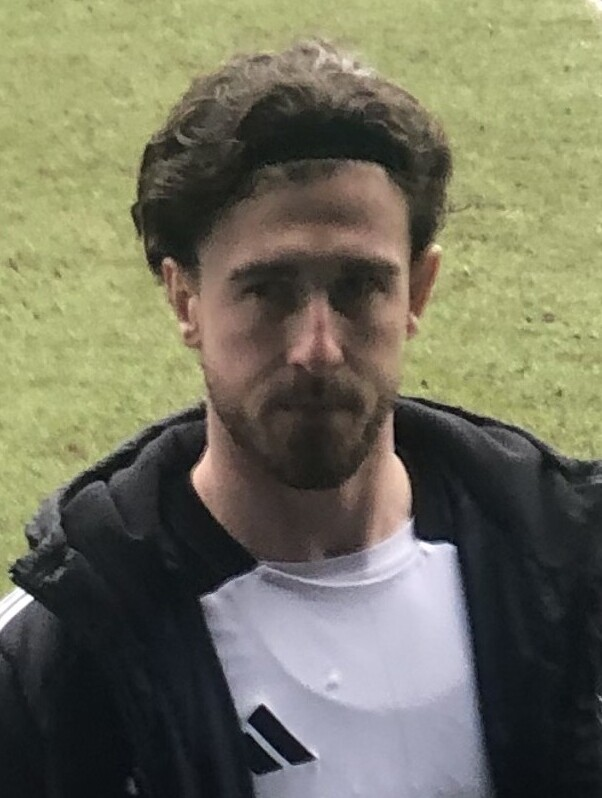
Cole Stockton scored once during his 2019 loan at Wrexham.

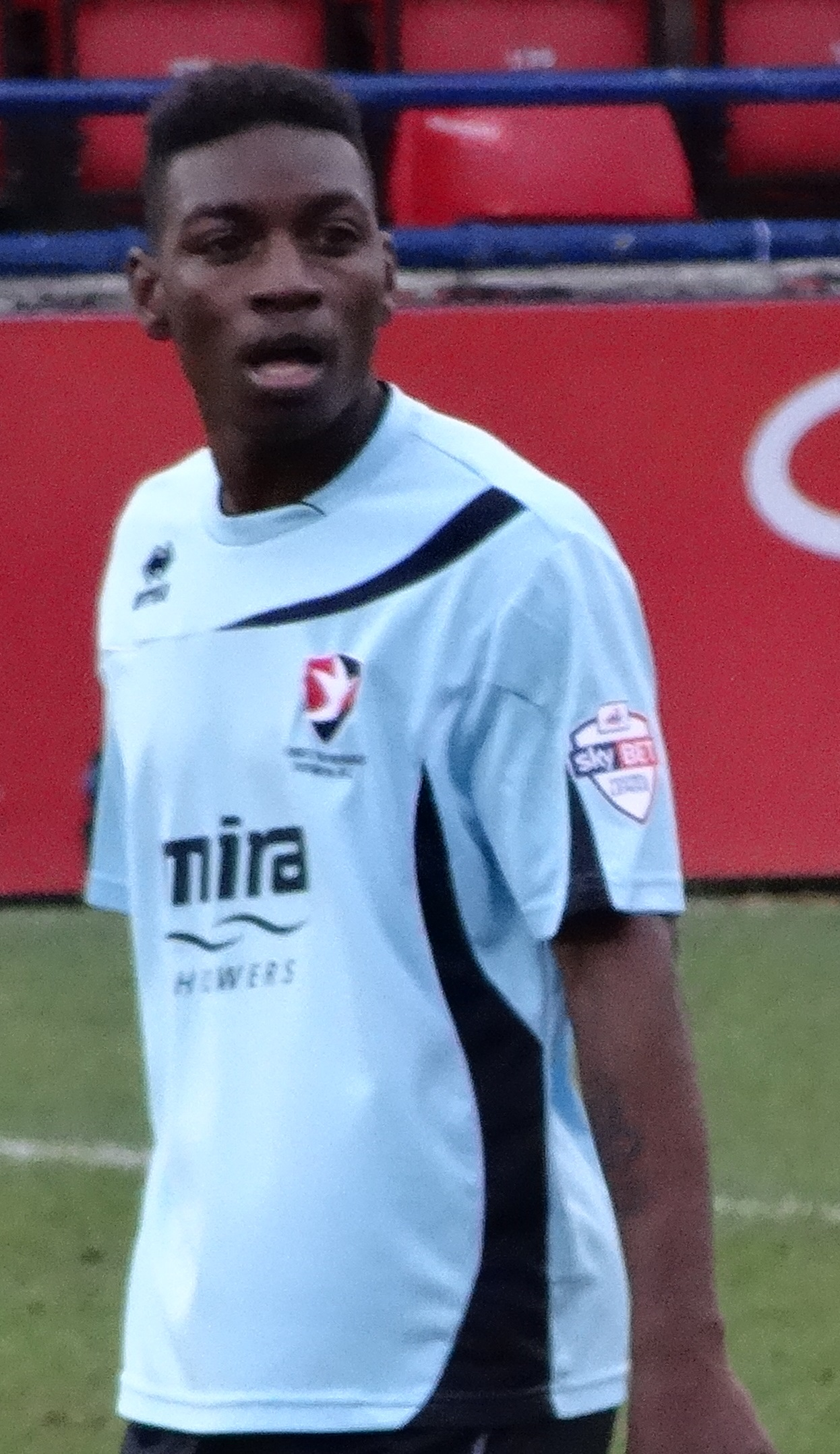
Jermaine McGlashan spent the last two months of the 2018–19 season on loan at Wrexham

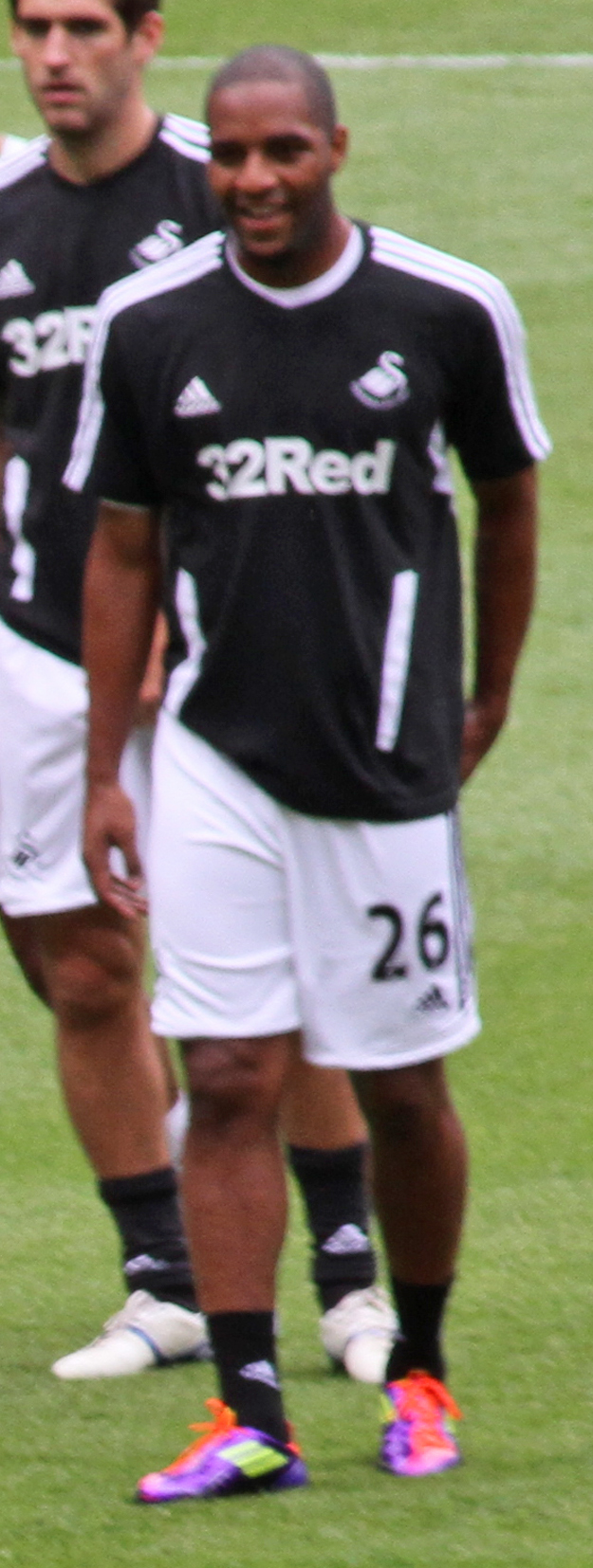
Kemy Agustien played 3 games for Wrexham in 2019.

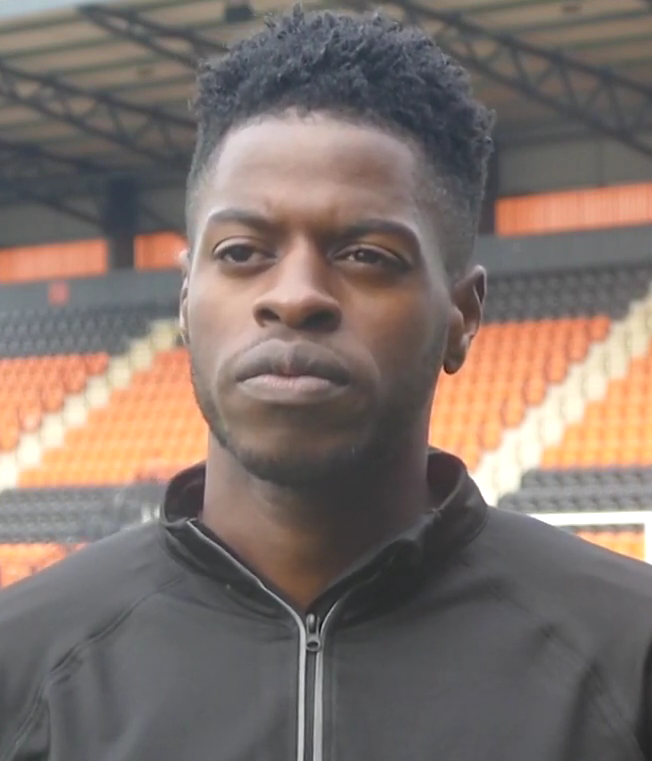
JJ Hooper scored 7 times in his 22 appeareances for Wrexham.

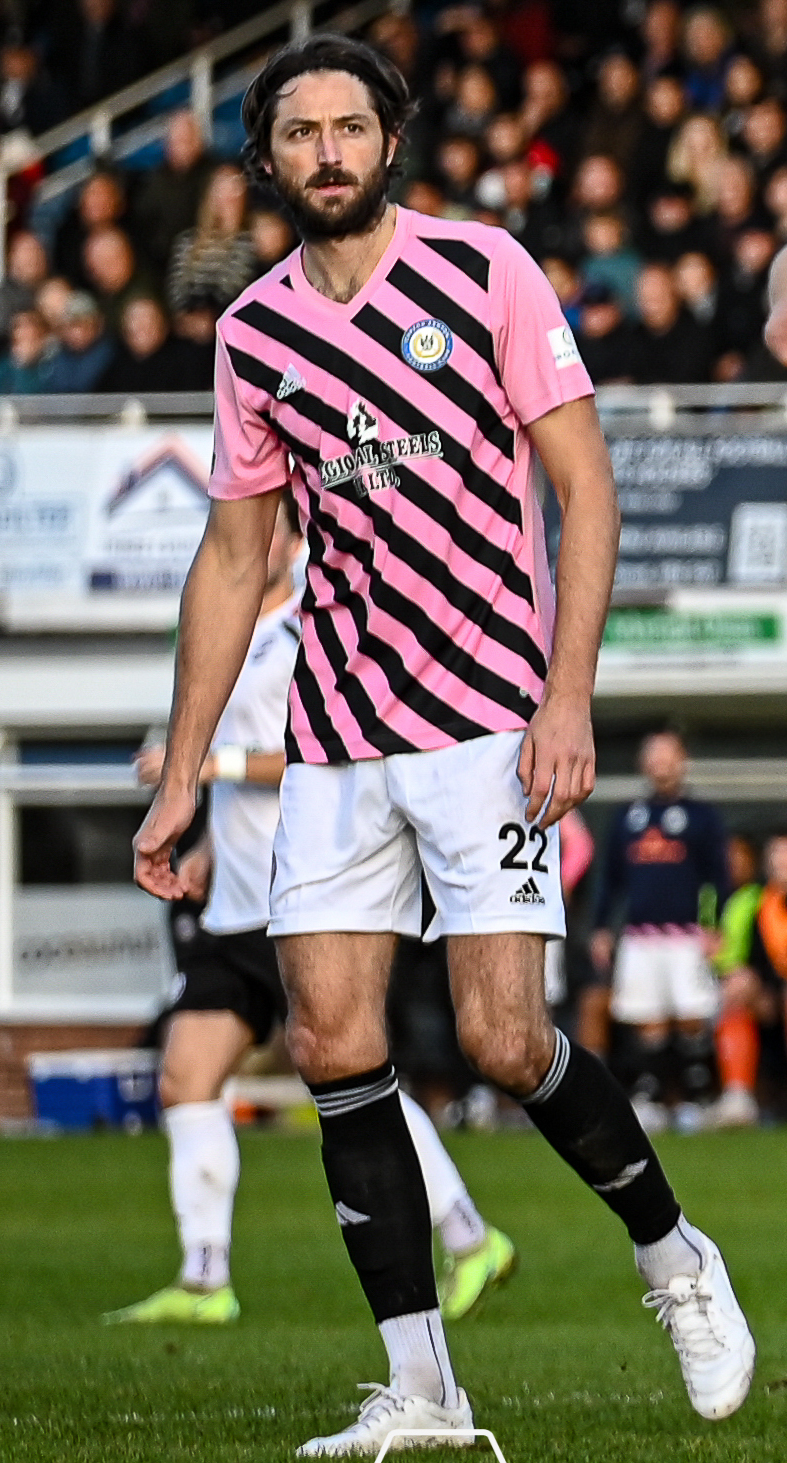
Adam Barton made 11 appearances for Wrexham in the 2019–20 season.

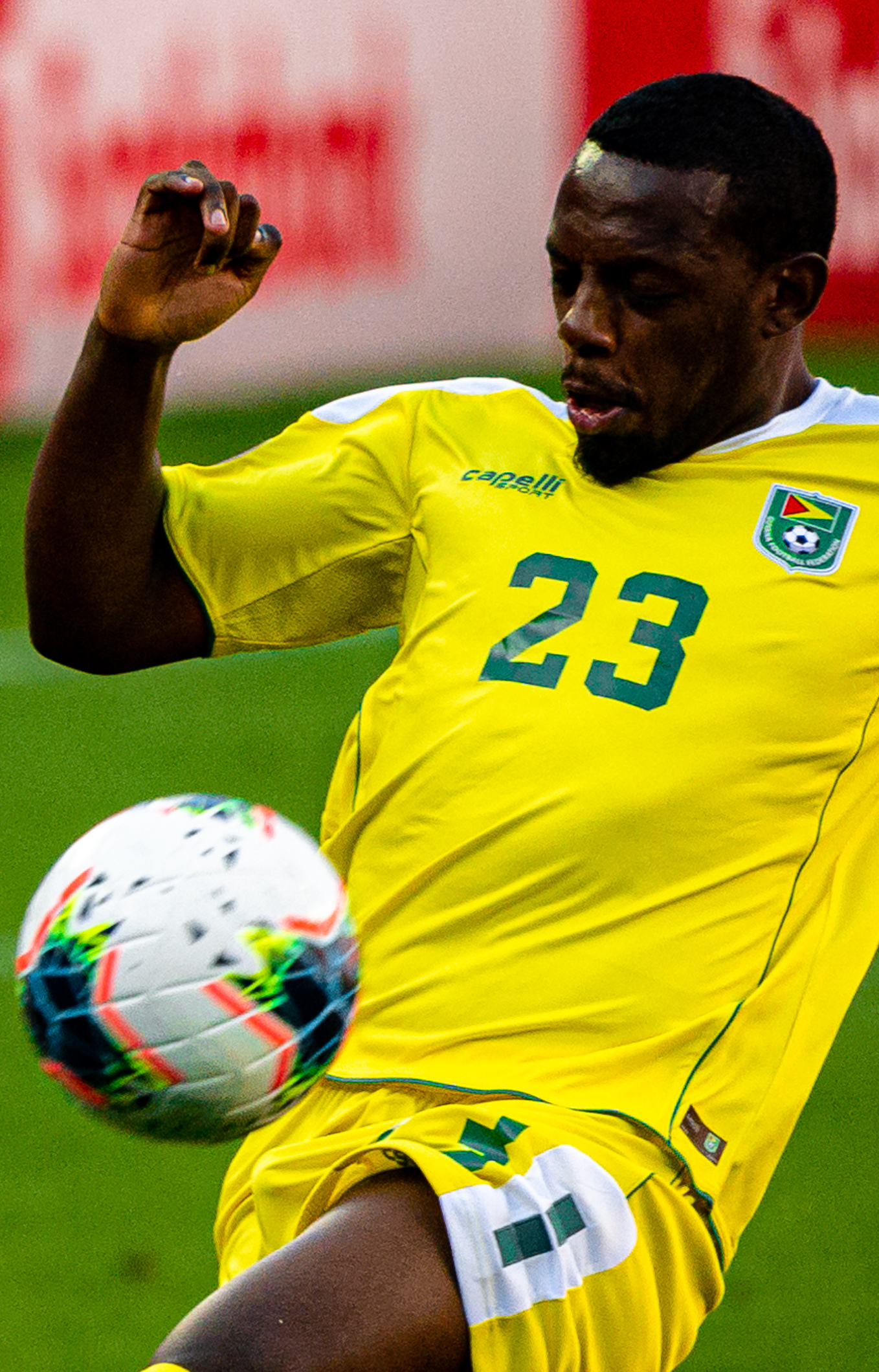
Guyana international Anthony Jeffrey made 9 appearances for Wrexham in the 2020–21 season

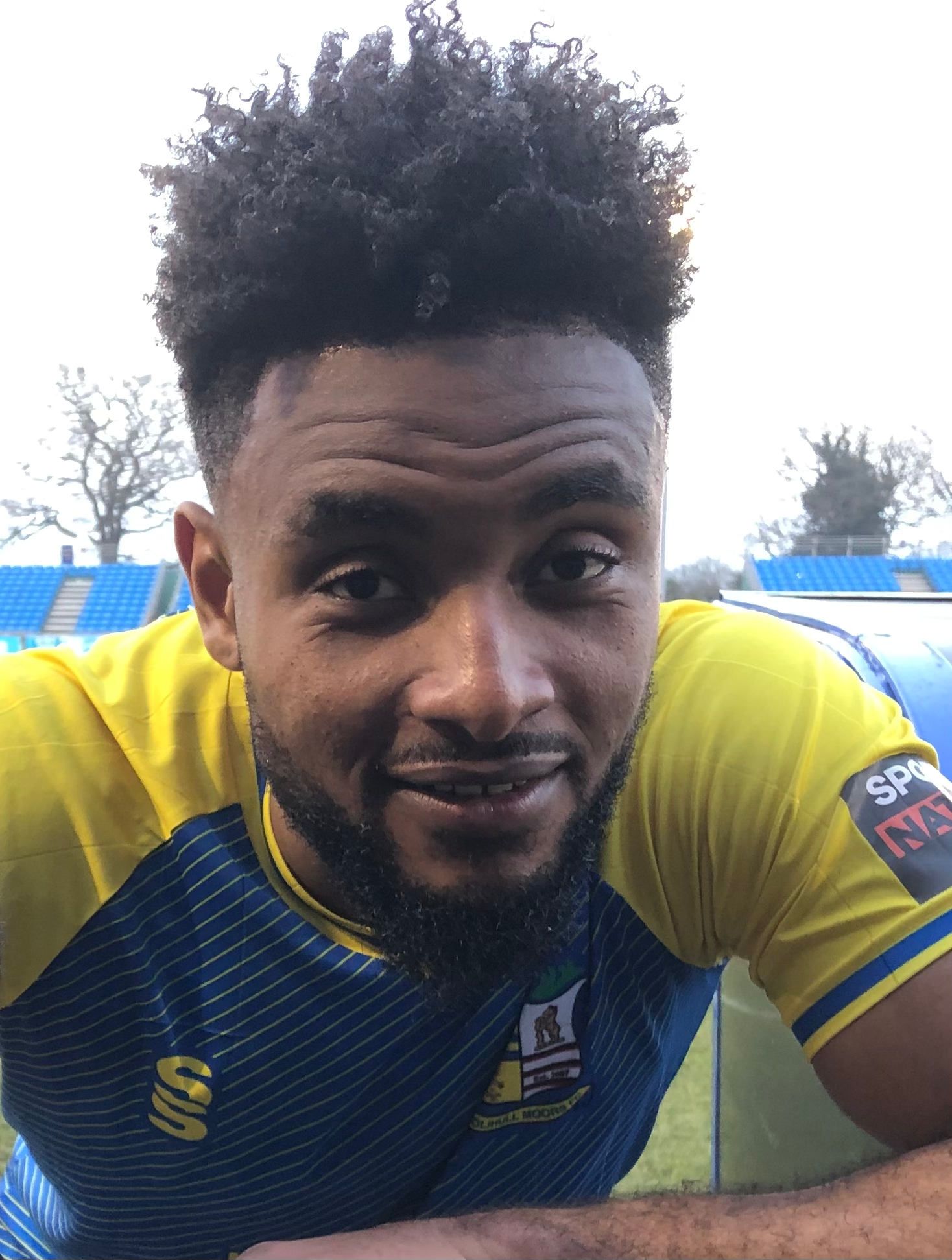
Adi Yussuf became the only Tanzanian to play for Wrexham during his 2020–21 season loan spell.

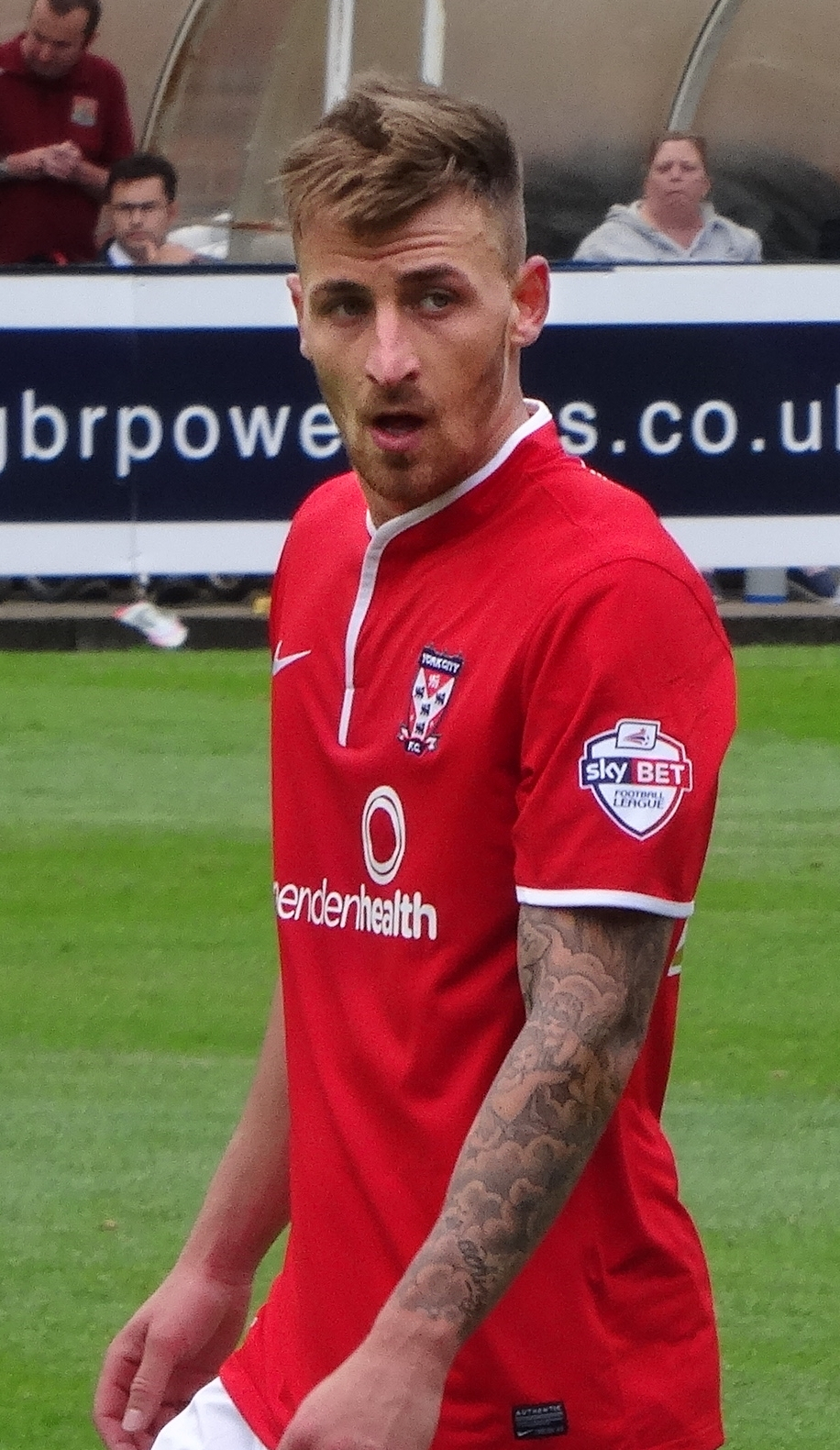
Jake Hyde scored 3 times in 16 appearances for Wrexham.

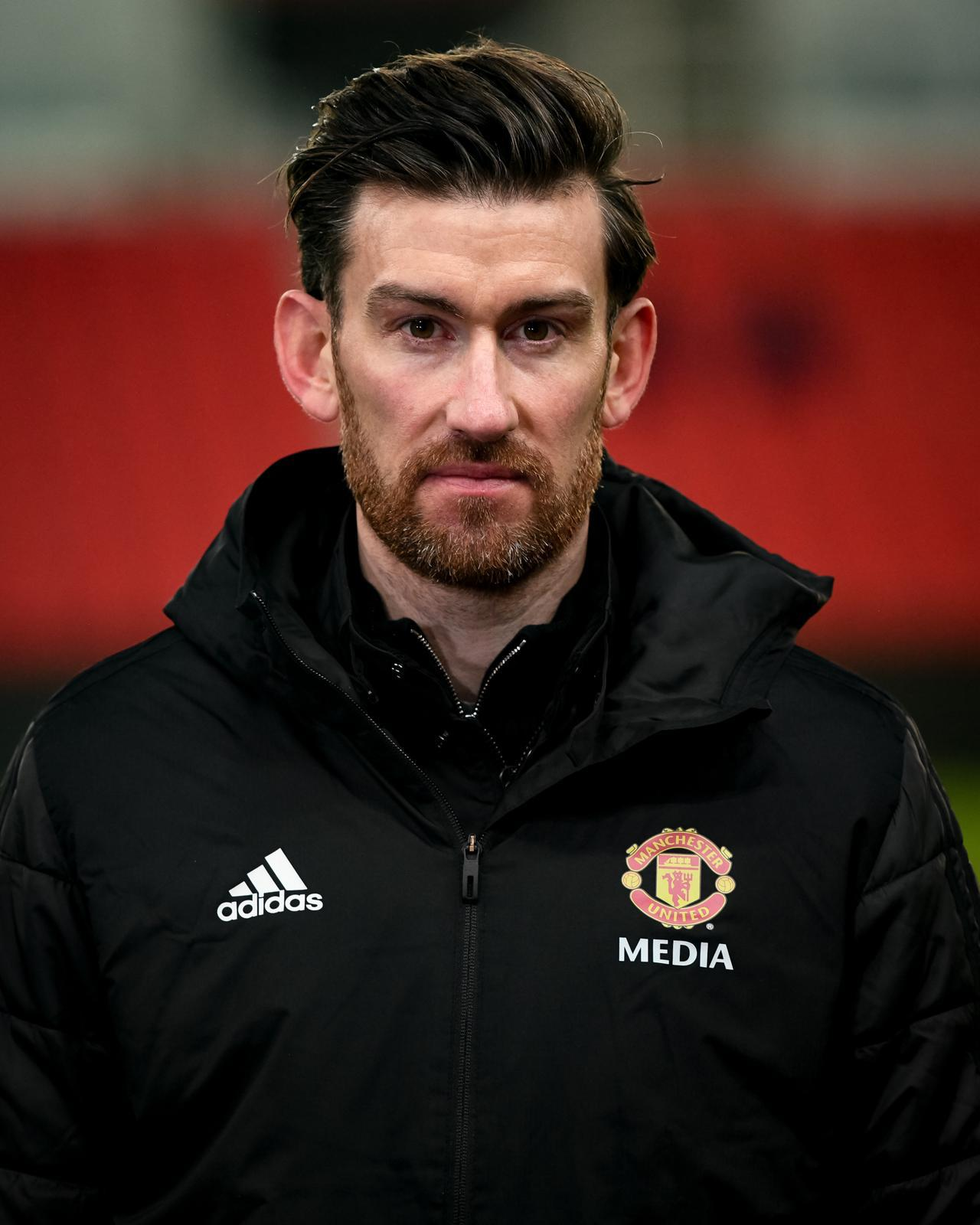
David Jones began his career in Wrexham's youth team, and ended his career playing for Wrexham's senior team.

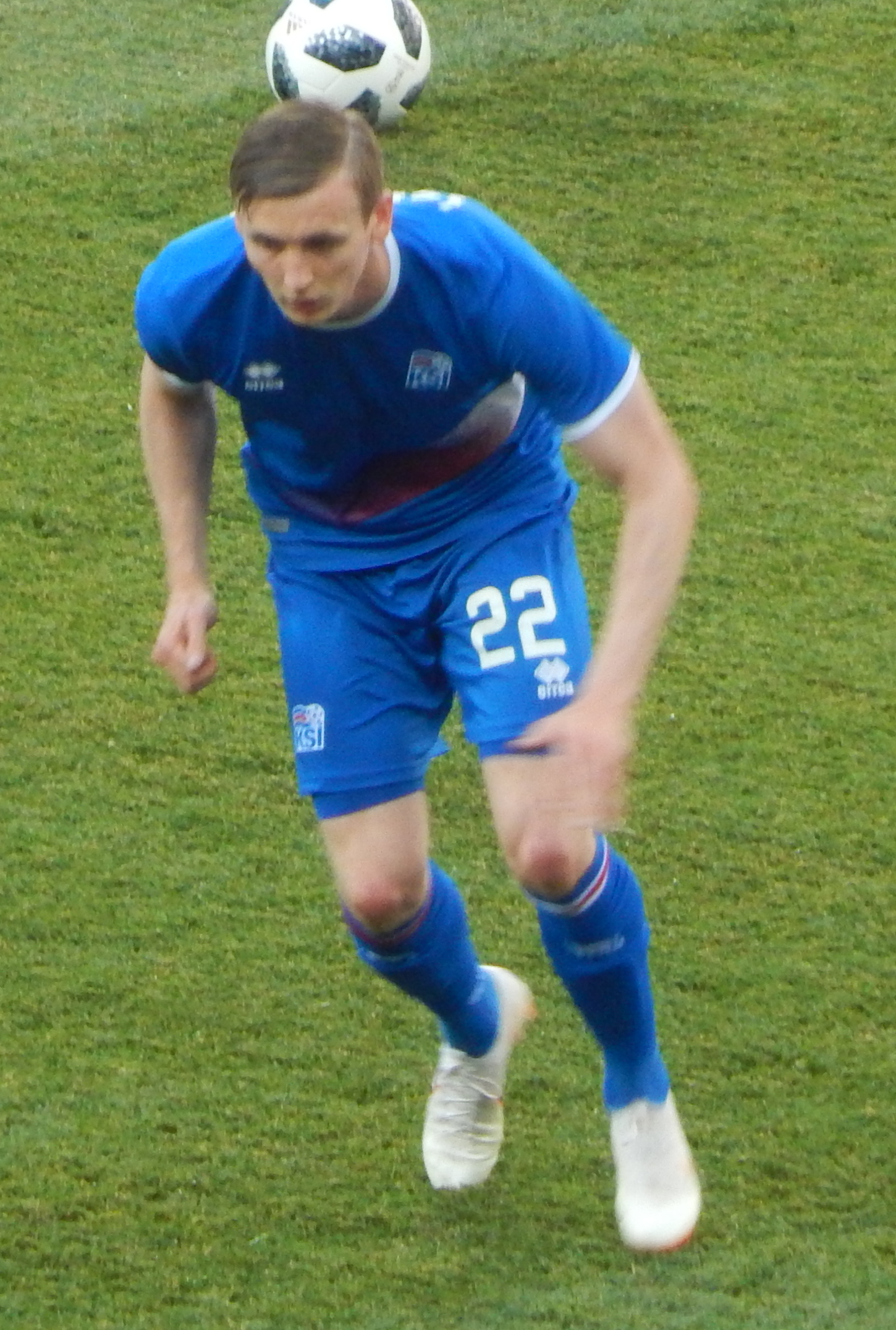
Jón Daði Böðvarsson is the only Icelandic player to play for Wrexham

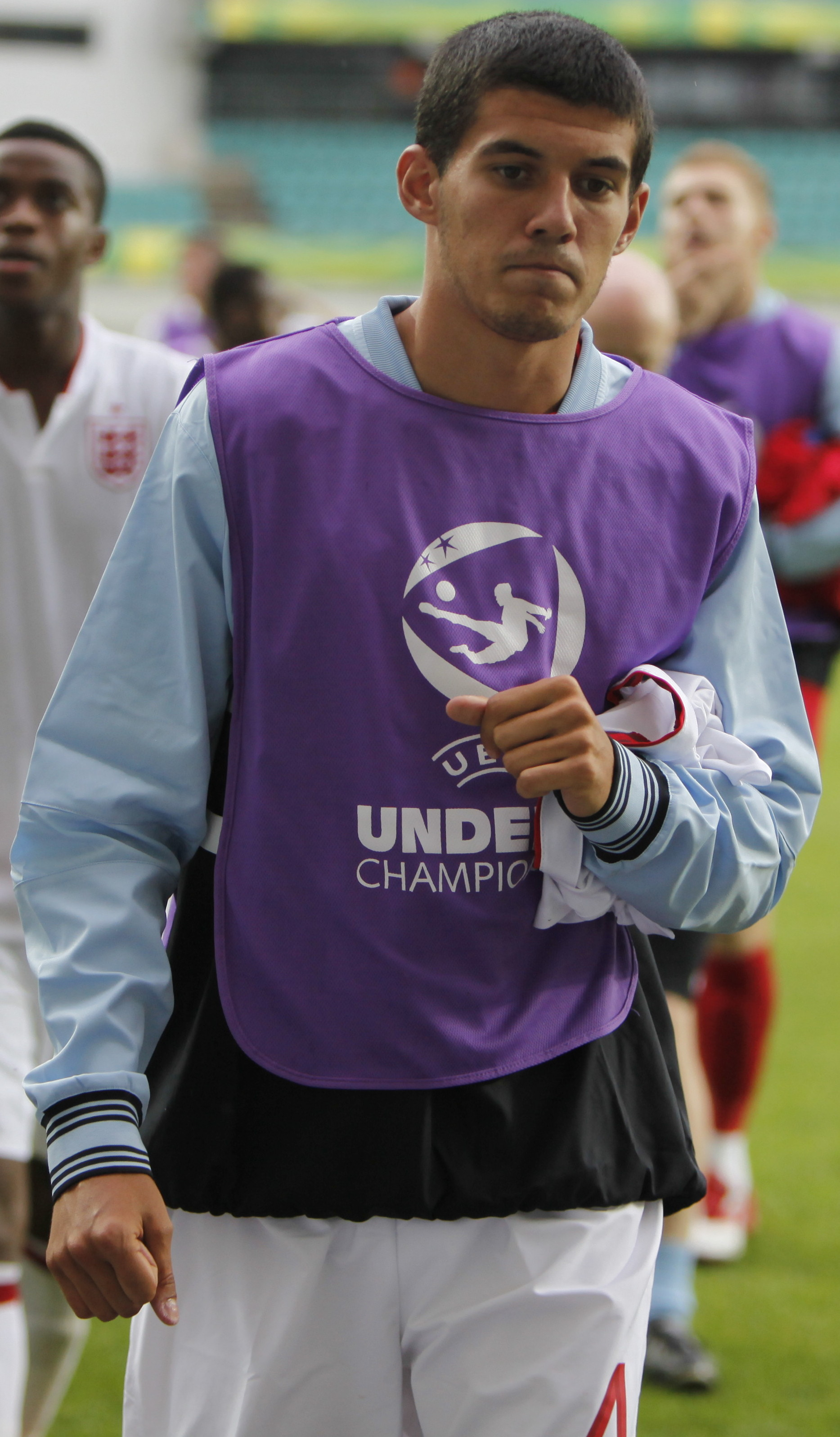
Former England international Conor Coady played for Wrexham between 2025 and 2026.

Players highlighted in bold are still actively playing at Wrexham.

List of Wrexham A.F.C. players with fewer than 25 appearances
Player	Nationality	Pos	Club career	Starts	Subs	Total	Goals
Player	Nationality	Pos	Club career	Appearances			Goals
Thomas Boden	Wales	FW	1877–1881	8	—N/a	8	1
A. Cooper	Wales	HB	1877	1	—N/a	1	0
Edwin Cross	Wales	HB	1877–1879	10	—N/a	10	0
Alfred Davies	Wales	HB	1877–1878	5	—N/a	5	0
James Davies	Wales	FW	1877–1878	5	—N/a	5	2
Charles Edwards	Wales	FW	1877–1881	12	—N/a	12	2
Edward Evans	Wales	HB	1877–1878	5	—N/a	5	0
W. J. Evans	Wales	GK	1877	2	—N/a	2	0
Edward Evans Jr.	Wales	FW	1877–1879	7	—N/a	7	2
Harry Loxham	Wales	FW	1877–1879	7	—N/a	7	0
Charles Murless	England	FB	1877–1879	7	—N/a	7	0
Broughton	Wales	HB	1877	1	—N/a	1	0
John Price	Wales	FW	1877–1882	14	—N/a	14	9
T. W. Davies	Wales	FB	1878–1879	5	—N/a	5	0
Edward Phennah	Wales	GK	1878; 1883	4	—N/a	4	0
H. Hamshaw	Wales	FB	1878	1	—N/a	1	0
J. Jones	Wales	HB	1878	1	—N/a	1	0
T. Jones	Wales	FB	1878–1879	4	—N/a	4	0
James Lloyd	Wales	FW	1878–1879	6	—N/a	6	0
Fred Owen	Wales	HB	1878–1879	5	—N/a	5	0
S. Powell	Wales	FW	1878	1	—N/a	1	0
G. Sherratt	Wales	HB	1878	1	—N/a	1	0
T. Woollam	Wales	GK	1878	1	—N/a	1	0
J. Davies	Wales	GK	1879	2	—N/a	2	0
John Davies	Wales	GK	1879–1882	6	—N/a	6	0
Henry Edwards	Wales	HB	1879–1884	16	—N/a	16	2
T. E. Hughes	Wales	FW	1879	3	—N/a	3	0
E. J. Roberts	Wales	FW	1879	3	—N/a	3	0
Tommi Davies	Wales	HB	1879	1	—N/a	1	0
A. B. Davies	Wales	FW	1881	1	—N/a	1	0
Harvey Davies	Wales	FW	1881	1	—N/a	1	0
T. Edisbury	Wales	FW	1881–1883	4	—N/a	4	2
J. Ingham	Wales	HB	1881–1884	5	—N/a	5	0
C. Roberts	Wales	FB	1881	3	—N/a	3	0
William Roberts	Wales	FW	1881–1887	18	—N/a	18	3
Tom Burke	Wales	HB	1881–1884	16	—N/a	16	0
Walter Davies	Wales	FB	1881–1884	13	—N/a	13	1
W. Jones	Wales	FW	1881; 1883	4	—N/a	4	3
T. Monitor	Wales	FB	1881	1	—N/a	1	0
J. Parry	Wales	HB	1881	2	—N/a	2	0
R. H. Parry	Wales	GK	1881–1882	2	—N/a	2	0
A. Poole	Wales	FW	1881	1	—N/a	1	0
A. Richards	Wales	FW	1881	2	—N/a	2	0
M. Davies	Wales	FW	1881–1884	8	—N/a	8	1
F. Jones	Wales	HB	1881	1	—N/a	1	0
Joe Jones	Wales	FW	1881–1883	9	—N/a	9	5
Henry Phoenix	Wales	HB	1881–1882	3	—N/a	3	0
George Thomas	Wales	FB	1881–1884	15	—N/a	15	0
T. Berkeley	Wales	HB	1881–1882	2	—N/a	2	0
J. Lee	Wales	FW	1881	1	—N/a	1	0
D. Owen	Wales	FB	1881	1	—N/a	1	0
T. Parry	Wales	GK	1881	1	—N/a	1	0
P. Farley	Wales	HB	1882	1	—N/a	1	0
R. Davies	Wales	FW	1882	1	—N/a	1	1
E. Griffiths	Wales	HB	1882–1884	7	—N/a	7	0
J. Owens	Wales	HB	1882	1	—N/a	1	0
Bill Roberts	Wales	FW	1882–1883	2	—N/a	2	2
James Trainer	Wales	GK	1882–1883	6	—N/a	6	0
B. Penlington	Wales	GK	1883–1884	2	—N/a	2	0
John Price Davies	Wales	FW	1883–1884	3	—N/a	3	1
J. Davies	Wales	FW	1883	3	—N/a	3	1
Herbert Sisson	Wales	FW	1883–1884	9	—N/a	9	3
W. Phoenix	Wales	HB	1883	1	—N/a	1	0
John Eyton-Jones	Wales	FW/HB	1883–1884	2	—N/a	2	0
J. Roberts	Wales	FB	1883	1	—N/a	1	0
R. Ingham	Wales	HB	1884	1	—N/a	1	1
E. Jones	Wales	GK	1884	1	—N/a	1	0
C. McDermott	Wales	FW	1884	1	—N/a	1	2
Robert Roberts	Wales	FB	1884–1887	7	—N/a	7	0
Job Wilding	Wales	FW	1884; 1888–1890	9	—N/a	9	2
Abel Hayes	Wales	HB	1884; 1888–1881	22	—N/a	22	1
C. L. Heywood	Wales	GK	1884	3	—N/a	3	0
F. Owen	Wales	FB	1884	1	—N/a	1	0
E. Owens	Wales	HB	1884; 1887	2	—N/a	2	0
J. Pugh	Wales	FW	1884	1	—N/a	1	0
T. Roberts	Wales	FW	1885–1889	4	—N/a	4	3
E. Carty	Wales	HB	1886–1887	2	—N/a	2	0
W. Fisher	Wales	HB	1886; 1890–1891	9	—N/a	9	0
Sam Gillam	Wales	GK	1886–1887; 1888–1890	11	—N/a	11	0
Sam Jones	Wales	FB	1886–1887	3	—N/a	3	0
Benjamin Lewis	Wales	FW	1886; 1896–1887	15	—N/a	15	10
Dick Turner	Wales	GK	1886–1891	20	—N/a	20	0
H. Edwards	Wales	HB	1887	1	—N/a	1	0
G. Thomas	Wales	HB	1887–1888	2	—N/a	2	0
P. Groom	Wales	FW	1887	1	—N/a	1	1
Richard Jones	Wales	FW	1887–1888	6	—N/a	6	3
J. Owens	Wales	HB	1887; 1890–1891	9	—N/a	9	0
J. Roberts	Wales	FW	1887	1	—N/a	1	0
G. J. Birch	Wales	FW	1888–1889	5	—N/a	5	0
Thomas Carty	Wales	HB	1888–1889	7	—N/a	7	0
Fred Evans	Wales	FB	1888–1890	11	—N/a	11	1
W. J. Hughes	Wales	FB	1888–1889	3	—N/a	3	0
C. Vaughan	Wales	FB	1888	6	—N/a	6	0
J. Whittaker	Wales	FW	1888	1	—N/a	1	0
J. Farrell	Wales	FW	1888	2	—N/a	2	1
H. J. Williams	Wales	FW	1888	4	—N/a	4	1
Parry	Wales	FW	1888	1	—N/a	1	0
Alfred Owen Davies	Wales	FB	1888–1889	3	—N/a	3	1
T. Malone	Wales	FW	1888	1	—N/a	1	0
Ned Davies	Wales	HB	1889–1890	3	—N/a	3	0
J. Jones	Wales	GK	1889	1	—N/a	1	0
W. Pugh	Wales	FW	1889	1	—N/a	1	0
Dick Jones	Wales	FW	1890	1	—N/a	1	0
Elils Owen	Wales	FB	1890	1	—N/a	1	0
Bob Roberts	Wales	FB	1890–1891	16	—N/a	16	0
Charlie Roberts	Wales	HB	1890	1	—N/a	1	0
John Roberts	Wales	FW	1890–1891	15	—N/a	15	5
W. Roberts	Wales	FW	1890	1	—N/a	1	0
Evan Williams	Wales	HB	1890–1891	17	—N/a	17	0
Jack Davies	Wales	HB	1890–1891	3	—N/a	3	0
E. Ellis	Wales	FB	1890–1891	17	—N/a	17	0
Fred Holmes	Wales	FW	1890–1891	5	—N/a	5	1
Joseph Hudson Turner	Wales	FW	1890–1891	7	—N/a	7	3
Oswald Davies	Wales	FW	1890–1891	5	—N/a	5	1
Trevor Pryce-Jones	Wales	FW	1890	3	—N/a	3	1
Robert Roberts	Wales	FW	1890	2	—N/a	2	1
J. H. Evison	Wales	HB	1890	1	—N/a	1	0
H. E. Eaborn	Wales	HB	1890	1	—N/a	1	0
C. M. Thomas	Wales	FW	1890	2	—N/a	2	0
Caffikey	Wales	FB	1891	1	—N/a	1	0
Mathias	Wales	HB	1891	1	—N/a	1	0
Arthur Roberts	Wales	FW	1891	2	—N/a	2	0
T. M. O. Shelby	Wales	FW	1891	1	—N/a	1	0
M. Cafferty	Wales	GK	1891	2	—N/a	2	0
T. Jones	Wales	FW	1891	2	—N/a	2	0
Bond	Wales	HB	1891	1	—N/a	1	0
G. Davies	Wales	HB	1891	1	—N/a	1	0
J. Ollerhead	Wales	FB	1891	1	—N/a	1	0
Pountley	Wales	FW	1891	1	—N/a	1	0
William Ball	Wales	GK	1896	6	—N/a	6	0
Arthur Ellis	Wales	FB	1896–1897	10	—N/a	10	0
William Griffiths	Wales	FW	1896	1	—N/a	1	0
John Hughes	Wales	FW	1896–1897	13	—N/a	13	7
John E. Jones	Wales	FW	1896	6	—N/a	6	1
John R. Jones	Wales	FB	1896–1897	12	—N/a	12	0
W. Lloyd	Wales	HB	1896	2	—N/a	2	0
Harry Pugh	Wales	FW	1896–1897	12	—N/a	12	5
Alfred Williams	Wales	FW	1896–1897	14	—N/a	14	6
Townshend	Wales	FB	1896	1	—N/a	1	0
R. Griffiths	Wales	FW	1896	1	—N/a	1	0
John Taylor	Wales	HB	1896–1897	9	—N/a	9	1
Thomas Davies	Wales	FW	1896–1897	7	—N/a	7	6
Shallcroft	Wales	GK	1896	3	—N/a	3	0
David Jardine	Scotland	GK	1897–1801	15	—N/a	15	0
Frank Stokes	Wales	HB	1897	1	—N/a	1	0
Harry Grainger	Wales	HB	1899–1802	24	—N/a	24	1
Fred Kelly	Wales	FW	1899–1800	12	—N/a	12	4
Joe Mitchell	Wales	HB	1899–1801; 1810–1813	14	—N/a	14	6
John Povah	Wales	FB	1899	9	—N/a	9	0
Joseph Rogers	Wales	FB	1899–1801	21	—N/a	21	0
Arthur Challoner	Wales	FW	1899; 1805	5	—N/a	5	1
Edwards	Wales	FB	1899	1	—N/a	1	0
Joe Jones	Wales	FW	1899	1	—N/a	1	0
Ellis Moss	Wales	HB	1899–1801; 1807	3	—N/a	3	0
Tom Moss	Wales	FB	1899–1801; 1805–1807	6	—N/a	6	0
J. S. Parry	Wales	HB	1899–1801	2	—N/a	2	0
E. O. Partington	Wales	FW	1899–1801	2	—N/a	2	1
Rowlands	Wales	FW	1899	1	—N/a	1	0
W. E. Lumberg	Wales	FW	1900	1	—N/a	1	0
Albert Potts	Wales	HB	1900	1	—N/a	1	0
Harry Trainer	Wales	FW	1900	1	—N/a	1	2
W. Robinson	Wales	FB	1900	1	—N/a	1	0
Arthur Davies	Wales	FW	1901; 1904	3	—N/a	3	0
T. Astbury	Wales	FW	1901	1	—N/a	1	0
R. Hughes	Wales	FW	1901	1	—N/a	1	0
R. Jones	Wales	HB	1901	1	—N/a	1	0
W. H. Jones	Wales	HB	1901	1	—N/a	1	0
H. Sanderson	Wales	FW	1901	1	—N/a	1	0
J. A. Williams	Wales	GK	1901	1	—N/a	1	0
H. H. Davies	Wales	FW	1901	1	—N/a	1	1
Enoch Jones	Wales	FW	1901	1	—N/a	1	0
J. J. Brooks	Wales	FW	1901	3	—N/a	3	1
Hughes	Wales	FW	1901	3	—N/a	3	0
J. Cane	Wales	FW	1902–1903; 1905	5	—N/a	5	1
William Davies	Wales	FW	1903–1904	6	—N/a	6	7
Jack Shaw	Wales	FW	1903; 1906	4	—N/a	4	0
J. W. Hughes	Wales	FB	1903	1	—N/a	1	0
Johnson	Wales	FW	1903	1	—N/a	1	0
Westley	Wales	GK	1903	1	—N/a	1	0
Green	Wales	FW	1904	1	—N/a	1	0
W. Griffiths	Wales	HB	1904	1	—N/a	1	1
Grindley	Wales	FW	1904	1	—N/a	1	0
Harry Grundy	England	FW	1904	1	—N/a	1	0
R. Williams	Wales	HB	1904	1	—N/a	1	0
Dick Evans	Wales	FW	1905	8	—N/a	8	4
Elias Roberts	Wales	FW	1905	11	—N/a	11	4
Sam Williams	Wales	FW	1905	3	—N/a	3	0
W. Evison	England	FB	1905	1	—N/a	1	0
H. G. Howell Jones	Wales	FW	1905–1906	5	—N/a	5	0
Richard Hughes	Wales	FW	1905; 1907	3	—N/a	3	0
Jones	Wales	FB	1905	1	—N/a	1	0
S. Parry	Wales	HB	1905	1	—N/a	1	0
Smith	Wales	GK	1905	1	—N/a	1	0
Dick Williams	Wales	FW	1905	4	—N/a	4	1
W. Williams	Wales	FW	1905–1906	19	—N/a	19	8
A. E. Billington	Wales	FB	1905	2	—N/a	2	0
Joe Blacktin	India	FB	1905	6	—N/a	6	0
Ambrose Lloyd	Wales	HB	1905–1906	4	—N/a	4	0
T. W. Fowler	Wales	GK	1906–1907	20	—N/a	20	0
J. W. Dawson	England	FB	1906–1907	17	—N/a	17	2
Owen Jones	Wales	FW	1906	3	—N/a	3	2
W. Bradshaw	England	FB	1906	5	—N/a	5	0
S. E. Coventry	England	GK	1906	9	—N/a	9	0
Jack Hughes	Wales	FB	1906–1907	22	—N/a	22	0
Tom Jones	Wales	HB	1906–1907	10	—N/a	10	2
Evan Thomas	Wales	GK	1906–1907	17	—N/a	17	0
R. E. Clarke	Wales	FW	1907	1	—N/a	1	0
George Griffiths	Wales	FW	1907–1908	2	—N/a	2	0
Percy Corbett	England	FW	1907	5	—N/a	5	0
S. G. Davies	Wales	GK	1907	2	—N/a	2	0
George Williams	Wales	HB	1907–1908	20	—N/a	20	1
E. Clarke	Wales	FW	1907	3	—N/a	3	3
Vic Jones	Wales	FW	1907	2	—N/a	2	0
F. Forkin	England	FW	1907	1	—N/a	1	0
Tommy Goodwin	Wales	FW	1907	2	—N/a	2	0
Albert Evans	Wales	FW	1907	6	—N/a	6	1
Arthur Evans	Wales	FW	1907–1909	4	—N/a	4	0
Ernie Millward	England	FW	1907	4	—N/a	4	1
Tommy Jones	Wales	FW	1907–1908	11	—N/a	11	2
Arnold Dargie	Wales	FW	1908	3	—N/a	3	1
J. Parry	Wales	FW	1908	1	—N/a	1	0
Jack Evans	Wales	FW	1908–1909	7	—N/a	7	0
Thomas Roberts	Wales	FW	1908–1909	8	—N/a	8	3
J. Williams	Wales	FW	1908	2	—N/a	2	0
Albert Dodd	Wales	FW	1908	2	—N/a	2	0
Walter Pike	Wales	FW	1908–1910	9	—N/a	9	4
Llew Morris	Wales	FB	1909; 1913–1914	16	—N/a	16	0
Edgar Bramhall	Wales	FW	1909	2	—N/a	2	0
Jack Yuill	England	FW	1909; 1910	3	—N/a	3	0
Jeffrey Jones	Wales	FB	1909	1	—N/a	1	0
W. J. Reid	Wales	FW	1909; 1913–1914	7	—N/a	7	2
J. Clutton	Wales	FW	1909	1	—N/a	1	0
Sam McAllister	England	FW	1909	15	—N/a	15	3
Glyn Jones	Wales	HB	1909–1910	2	—N/a	2	0
Charles Morgan	Wales	GK	1909–1910	5	—N/a	5	0
Henry Shepherd	Wales	FW	1909–1910	11	—N/a	11	5
Emlyn Jones	Wales	HB	1909–1910; 1914	9	—N/a	9	0
Fred Rogers	Wales	FB	1909–1910	4	—N/a	4	0
Harry Jones	Wales	FW	1910; 1920	7	—N/a	7	1
J. E. Griffiths	Wales	GK	1910	2	—N/a	2	0
Charles Barker	Wales	FW	1910	6	—N/a	6	4
Charles Jones	Wales	FW	1910	5	—N/a	5	1
Morris Rowland	Wales	FW	1910	1	—N/a	1	1
E. Kenyon	Wales	FW	1910	1	—N/a	1	0
Fred Riddell	England	FW	1910	2	—N/a	2	0
S. Jones	Wales	FW	1910–1911	3	—N/a	3	0
Sydney Hughes	Wales	FB	1911	1	—N/a	1	0
Thomas Murray	England	FB	1911	11	—N/a	11	0
James Dillon	Wales	HB	1911–1912	8	—N/a	8	0
Harry Hutsby	England	FB	1911–1912	21	—N/a	21	0
A. McGuffie	Wales	FW	1911	3	—N/a	3	1
Charlie Morris	Wales	FB	1911–1912	24	—N/a	24	0
Albert Pitt	England	FW	1911	7	—N/a	7	5
Arthur Richards	Wales	FW	1911	1	—N/a	1	0
Frank Davies	Wales	FW	1911	3	—N/a	3	2
Robert Depledge	England	GK	1911	3	—N/a	3	0
Thomas Corrin	Wales	FW	1911	1	—N/a	1	0
F. Greaves	Wales	FB	1911	1	—N/a	1	0
W. C. Humphreys	Wales	FW	1911	1	—N/a	1	0
Tommy Jones	Wales	FW	1911–1914	6	—N/a	6	2
Ellis Peters	Wales	FB	1911	2	—N/a	2	0
Alf Osborne	Wales	FW	1911–1912	5	—N/a	5	5
Harold Evans	Wales	FW	1912	1	—N/a	1	0
Harry Lappin	England	FW	1912	5	—N/a	5	1
Arthur Green	Wales	FW	1912	2	—N/a	2	1
W. T. Harvard	Wales	FW	1912	3	—N/a	3	0
Ossie Lewis	Wales	FW	1912	6	—N/a	6	0
Harry Welfare	Wales	FW	1912	1	—N/a	1	0
William Stuart	England	FW	1912–1913	16	—N/a	16	6
Len Catherall	Wales	FW	1912	8	—N/a	8	1
A. Hughes	Wales	FW	1912	1	—N/a	1	0
Fred Stevens	Wales	FW	1913	4	—N/a	4	2
James Fleming	Wales	FW	1913–1914	6	—N/a	6	0
Lem Edwards	Wales	FW	1913	2	—N/a	2	0
Elms	Wales	FW	1913	1	—N/a	1	0
Dr. Forsyth	Wales	FB	1913	1	—N/a	1	0
Walter Jones	Wales	FW	1913	3	—N/a	3	1
Billy Vaughan	Wales	FW	1913	1	—N/a	1	0
S. Hughes	Wales	FW	1913	2	—N/a	2	1
D. J. Davies	Wales	FW	1913	1	—N/a	1	0
Bert Hoskins	England	FW	1913–1914	8	—N/a	8	4
Reg Jones	Wales	FW	1913–1914	24	—N/a	24	7
H. Gallagher	Wales	GK	1914	10	—N/a	10	0
Joe Williams	Wales	FW	1914–1915	6	—N/a	6	0
Edward Hughes	Wales	FW	1914	12	—N/a	12	4
E. Westley	Wales	GK	1914	1	—N/a	1	0
F. Cawthra	Wales	FW	1914	7	—N/a	7	4
James Antwiss	Wales	FW	1914	4	—N/a	4	1
H. Wynne-Owen	Wales	GK	1914	1	—N/a	1	0
Bill Goodwin	Wales	FB	1914	1	—N/a	1	0
Caldow	Wales	HB	1914	1	—N/a	1	0
Freddie Blackburn	England	FW	1914–1915	12	—N/a	12	1
D. J. Davies	Wales	FW	1914	2	—N/a	2	0
Henry Oakes	Wales	FW	1914	2	—N/a	2	0
G. T. Matthias	Wales	GK	1915	2	—N/a	2	0
T. Owens	Wales	FW	1915	13	—N/a	13	7
Frank Jones	Wales	FB	1915	8	—N/a	8	0
T. Jones	Wales	FB	1915	1	—N/a	1	0
Roberts	Wales	HB	1915	1	—N/a	1	0
Johnnie Bell	Scotland	FW	1919	2	—N/a	2	0
E. Bickley	Wales	HB	1919	1	—N/a	1	0
Syd Hughes	Wales	FB	1919	3	—N/a	3	0
Sam Lewis	Wales	FW	1919–1920	13	—N/a	13	3
Thomas Owens	Wales	FW	1919–1920	24	—N/a	24	12
John Lewis	Wales	FW	1919	1	—N/a	1	1
E. Parry	Wales	HB	1919	2	—N/a	2	0
Simmonds	Wales	FB	1919	1	—N/a	1	0
Harry Smith	England	FB	1919	1	—N/a	1	0
Ben Jones	Wales	FW	1919	2	—N/a	2	3
Percy Jones	Wales	FW	1919	1	—N/a	1	1
Ron Jones	Wales	FW	1919	2	—N/a	2	0
Thomas Charleston	England	FB	1920–1921	2	—N/a	2	0
Butterton	Wales	FW	1920	6	—N/a	6	5
J. Morris	Wales	FW	1920	3	—N/a	3	0
H. Ellis	Wales	FW	1920	4	—N/a	4	0
Alf Bishop	England	FW	1920–1921	9	—N/a	9	0
Fred Jones	England	FW	1920	3	—N/a	3	1
Jabez Evans	Wales	FW	1920	11	—N/a	11	0
Herbert Matthews	Wales	FW	1920–1921	5	—N/a	5	1
Arthur Wray	England	FW	1920	1	—N/a	1	0
J. W. Sutherland	Wales	GK	1920–1921	3	—N/a	3	0
Robert Jones	Wales	FW	1920–1921	3	—N/a	3	2
T. P. T. Jones	Wales	FW	1920	1	—N/a	1	0
John Hughes	Wales	FW	1920	1	—N/a	1	2
C. D. Rathbone	Wales	FW	1921	1	—N/a	1	0
John Pickering	Wales	FW	1921	13	—N/a	13	1
W. T. Morris	Wales	HB	1921	1	—N/a	1	0
William Williams	Wales	FB	1921	1	—N/a	1	0
Reg Leck	England	FW	1921–1922	17	—N/a	17	6
Chris Elvidge	England	FW	1921–1922	15	—N/a	15	4
Gordon Jones	England	FW	1921	1	—N/a	1	1
Jonathan Evans	Wales	FW	1921–1922	3	—N/a	3	1
John Williams	Wales	FW	1921–1922	2	—N/a	2	0
Billy Matthews	Wales	FW	1921–1922	3	—N/a	3	2
Cyril Northam	England	FW	1922	16	—N/a	16	4
Lot Jones	Wales	FW	1922	7	—N/a	7	2
William Cope	England	FB	1922–1923	15	—N/a	15	0
Stan Rowlands	Wales	FW	1922–1923	9	—N/a	9	0
James Roberts	Wales	FW	1922	6	—N/a	6	0
Andy Moffat	Scotland	FW	1922–1923	10	—N/a	10	0
Percy Jones	Wales	FW	1923	1	—N/a	1	0
John Davies	Wales	HB	1923	1	—N/a	1	0
Richard Warburton	England	FW	1923	6	—N/a	6	1
Tommy Millington	Wales	FW	1923–1924	4	—N/a	4	0
Tommy Boyle	England	HB	1923	7	—N/a	7	0
Ralph Lenney	England	FW	1923–1924	16	—N/a	16	1
Tom Meigh	England	FW	1923	3	—N/a	3	0
Billy Houston	Scotland	FW	1923–1924	3	—N/a	3	1
Frank Williams	Wales	FW	1923–1926	6	—N/a	6	0
Arthur Hughes	Wales	FW	1924–1926	18	—N/a	18	5
Billy Robinson	England	HB	1924	1	—N/a	1	0
Bob Williams	Wales	FW	1924	3	—N/a	3	0
Jesse Bird	England	FW	1924	8	—N/a	8	0
Edward Lovelady	England	FW	1924	10	—N/a	10	0
William Vaughan	England	FW	1924	11	—N/a	11	2
Bill Graham	England	FW	1924–1925	7	—N/a	7	2
Fred Howard	England	FW	1924	1	—N/a	1	0
Bob Hodgkinson	England	FW	1924–1925; 1926–1927	18	—N/a	18	6
Jonathan Davies	Wales	FW	1924	1	—N/a	1	0
Bob Miles	Wales	FW	1924–1925	4	—N/a	4	0
Howard Pitt	Wales	FW	1924–1926	7	—N/a	7	0
Herbie Large	Wales	FW	1925	1	—N/a	1	0
Bill Connell	England	GK	1925–1926	10	—N/a	10	0
Hywel Davies	Wales	FW	1925–1927	17	—N/a	17	0
John Warburton	England	FW	1925	1	—N/a	1	0
Rowland Bailey	England	FW	1925	11	—N/a	11	2
Jack Holland	England	FW	1925	9	—N/a	9	2
Frank Weaver	England	FW	1925	1	—N/a	1	0
Joe Keetley	England	FW	1925–1926	7	—N/a	7	3
Frank Roberts	Wales	FW	1926	8	—N/a	8	4
Eric Williams	Wales	HB	1926	1	—N/a	1	0
Eddie Lawrence	Wales	HB	1926–1928	24	—N/a	24	0
William Brown	England	FW	1926	1	—N/a	1	0
George Appleyard	England	FW	1926	5	—N/a	5	2
Uriah Miles	England	FW	1926	13	—N/a	13	1
Harry Lovatt	England	FW	1926–1927	12	—N/a	12	5
Price Jones	Wales	FW	1927	2	—N/a	2	0
Bernard Condon	Wales	FW	1927	2	—N/a	2	0
Bill Harris	England	FW	1927–1928	14	—N/a	14	2
Harry Bingham	Wales	FW	1927–1928	4	—N/a	4	0
Arthur Smith	Wales	GK	1927–1928	5	—N/a	5	0
Bob Jones	Wales	FW	1928	2	—N/a	2	2
Arthur Evans	Wales	GK	1928	2	—N/a	2	0
Arthur Lucas	Wales	GK	1928	4	—N/a	4	0
Ken Greatrex	England	GK	1928–1930	17	—N/a	17	0
Ernie Islip	England	FW	1928–1929	16	—N/a	16	1
John Neal	Wales	FW	1929	17	—N/a	17	3
John Ascroft	England	FW	1929–1930	10	—N/a	10	6
Jack Richards	Wales	HB	1929	4	—N/a	4	0
Ossie Jones	Wales	FW	1929; 1932–1933	3	—N/a	3	0
Iorwerth Richards	Wales	FW	1929	2	—N/a	2	0
George Wynne	Wales	FW	1929–1930	9	—N/a	9	1
Norman Baker	Wales	FW	1929	1	—N/a	1	0
Walter Rooney	England	HB	1929–1930	13	—N/a	13	0
John Richard Smith	England	FW	1930	6	—N/a	6	2
Bill Leeming	England	FB	1930	1	—N/a	1	0
Arthur Buxton	England	FB	1930–1932	18	—N/a	18	0
Bernard Parden	England	FW	1930–1932	13	—N/a	13	9
Horace Jackson	Wales	FB	1930	1	—N/a	1	0
Albert Hill	England	HB	1930–1931	4	—N/a	4	0
Norman Rigby	England	GK	1931	2	—N/a	2	0
Walter Bamford	Wales	FW	1931	1	—N/a	1	0
Billy Welsh	Scotland	FW	1931	11	—N/a	11	2
Edgar Wright	Wales	FW	1931	2	—N/a	2	0
Chris Ferguson	Scotland	FW	1931–1932	18	—N/a	18	4
Jack Prince	England	GK	1931	4	—N/a	4	0
Arthur Jones	Wales	FW	1931–1932	8	—N/a	8	1
Cyril Price	England	FW	1932	2	—N/a	2	1
Emlyn Williams	Wales	FB	1932–1933	3	—N/a	3	0
Bill Lanyon	Wales	FW	1932	2	—N/a	2	0
Frank McKenna	England	FW	1932–1933	10	—N/a	10	5
Wilson Jones	Wales	FW	1932–1934	8	—N/a	8	4
Harry Littlehales	England	HB	1932	5	—N/a	5	0
John Molloy	England	HB	1932	1	—N/a	1	0
Barney McCabe	England	FW	1933	5	—N/a	5	0
Joseph Shonakan	England	FW	1933	4	—N/a	4	0
John Foyne	England	FW	1933	1	—N/a	1	0
Fred Smallwood	Wales	FW	1934	1	—N/a	1	1
Bill Wyness	England	FW	1934–1935	2	—N/a	2	0
Jimmy Rice	Scotland	FW	1935	7	—N/a	7	7
Percy Manuel	England	FW	1935	2	—N/a	2	0
Bert Jones	Wales	GK	1935–1937	20	—N/a	20	0
Billy Jeavons	England	FW	1935	2	—N/a	2	0
Eli Postin	England	FW	1935–1936	12	—N/a	12	2
T. G. Jones	Wales	HB	1935–1936	8	—N/a	8	0
Cliff Bryant	England	HB	1936–1937	8	—N/a	8	0
Harold Readett	England	FB	1936	1	—N/a	1	0
Billy Barrow	Wales	FW	1936–1937	15	—N/a	15	2
John Smith	Scotland	FW	1937	12	—N/a	12	1
Dai Phillips	Wales	FW	1937–1938	16	—N/a	16	1
Hugh Robertson	Scotland	FB	1937	6	—N/a	6	0
Nathan James Fraser	Scotland	FW	1937–1938	21	—N/a	21	3
Sidney Barnard	England	FW	1937	2	—N/a	2	1
Tom Breakwell	England	HB	1937–1938	3	—N/a	3	0
Willie Ouchterlonie	Scotland	FW	1937	3	—N/a	3	0
Zander Smith	Scotland	HB	1937	7	—N/a	7	0
John Wilson	England	FW	1937–1938	7	—N/a	7	0
Cliff Lloyd	Wales	FW	1938	12	—N/a	12	2
Joe McAleer	Scotland	FW	1938	7	—N/a	7	1
Jim Smith	England	FB	1938–1939	24	—N/a	24	0
Jackie Lloyd	Wales	FW	1938	1	—N/a	1	0
Fred Goss	England	FW	1938	9	—N/a	9	1
Tom Davies	England	FW	1938	1	—N/a	1	0
Frank Briggs	England	HB	1939	1	—N/a	1	0
Billy Cook	Northern Ireland	FB	1939; 1945	3	—N/a	3	0
John Jones	Wales	GK	1939	1	—N/a	1	0
Ronnie Dix	England	FW	1945	2	—N/a	2	1
Len Duns	England	FW	1945	2	—N/a	2	1
Johnny Hancocks	England	FW	1945	2	—N/a	2	1
Dennis Isherwood	England	FW	1945	2	—N/a	2	0
Tony Collins	Wales	FW	1945	2	—N/a	2	0
Aubrey Hayward	Wales	FW	1945	2	—N/a	2	1
Cliff Lloyd	England	FW	1945	2	—N/a	2	2
George Wainwright	Wales	FW	1945	2	—N/a	2	1
Dave Whitelaw	Scotland	GK	1945	1	—N/a	1	0
Roger Ashton	Wales	GK	1945	1	—N/a	1	0
Freddie Haycock	England	FW	1946	6	—N/a	6	1
Joe Lloyd	Wales	HB	1946–1947	24	—N/a	24	0
Albert Malam	England	FW	1946	6	—N/a	6	1
Peter Baines	Australia	FW	1946	6	—N/a	6	2
Len Hewitt	Wales	FW	1946–1947	6	—N/a	6	4
Murray Archibald	Scotland	FW	1946	1	—N/a	1	0
Terry McNee	England	GK	1946	15	—N/a	15	0
Norman Jones	Wales	GK	1946–1947	2	—N/a	2	0
Percy Lovett	England	GK	1947	14	—N/a	14	0
Harry Hollis	Wales	FB	1947	1	—N/a	1	0
Ed McIlvenny	United States	FW	1947	8	—N/a	8	1
Jack Jones	Wales	FW	1947–1948	24	—N/a	24	5
Frank McGinn	Scotland	FW	1947	2	—N/a	2	0
Alf Somerfield	England	FW	1947	2	—N/a	2	1
Tom Bayley	England	GK	1947–1948	7	—N/a	7	0
Jim Atherton	Wales	GK	1947–1948	20	—N/a	20	0
Robert Walker	Scotland	FW	1948	2	—N/a	2	0
Ron Mawson	England	GK	1948–1949	7	—N/a	7	0
Fred Sharpe	England	FW	1948	1	—N/a	1	0
Glyn Williams	Wales	FB	1949	4	—N/a	4	0
Stuart Williams	Wales	FW	1949	1	—N/a	1	0
Len Rowland	England	FB	1949–1950	22	—N/a	22	0
Les McDowall	Scotland	HB	1949	4	—N/a	4	0
Ken Ellis	Wales	FW	1949–1950	5	—N/a	5	0
Ron Wood	England	FW	1949–1950	18	—N/a	18	5
Bobby McLaughlin	Northern Ireland	HB	1950	21	—N/a	21	0
Dennis Edwards	Wales	FW	1950	1	—N/a	1	1
Harold Spencer	England	HB	1950–1951	11	—N/a	11	0
Willie Hayes	Ireland	GK	1950–1951	15	—N/a	15	0
Brian Johnson	England	FW	1950–1952	14	—N/a	14	2
David McAdam	England	FB	1950–1951	10	—N/a	10	0
Estyn Griffiths	Wales	HB	1950–1951	10	—N/a	10	0
Jack Hilton	England	FW	1950–1951	3	—N/a	3	0
Dick Grieve	Scotland	FW	1950	1	—N/a	1	0
Jimmy Wyllie	Scotland	FW	1950–1951	22	—N/a	22	4
Colin Grainger	England	FW	1951–1953	5	—N/a	5	0
Dilwyn Roberts	Wales	FW	1951	1	—N/a	1	0
Willie Jessop	England	FW	1951–1952	16	—N/a	16	3
John Kirby	United States	FB	1951–1952	5	—N/a	5	0
Robert Williams	England	FW	1951	7	—N/a	7	0
Len Wootton	England	FW	1951–1952	23	—N/a	23	2
Archie McWhinnie	Scotland	HB	1951	2	—N/a	2	0
Ken Roberts	Wales	FW	1951	1	—N/a	1	0
Ray Williams	Wales	FB	1951–1952	12	—N/a	12	0
Bernard Bonner	Scotland	FW	1952	1	—N/a	1	0
Neville Jones	Wales	FW	1952	1	—N/a	1	0
George McMillan	Scotland	FW	1952	1	—N/a	1	0
Phil Spruce	England	HB	1953–1955	23	—N/a	23	0
Keith Matthews	Wales	FW	1953–1955	9	—N/a	9	0
Earl Godding	Wales	GK	1953–1958	24	—N/a	24	0
Brian Griffiths	Wales	FW	1953–1957	22	—N/a	22	11
Tecwyn Jones	Wales	FB	1953–1954	5	—N/a	5	0
Derek Williams	Wales	GK	1954–1955	12	—N/a	12	0
David Jackson	England	FW	1954	10	—N/a	10	3
Peter Jackson	England	HB	1954	10	—N/a	10	1
Eddie Williams	England	FW	1954	1	—N/a	1	0
Keith Bannister	England	HB	1955	14	—N/a	14	0
Eric Littler	England	FW	1955	12	—N/a	12	1
Dennis Evans	England	FB	1956–1958	11	—N/a	11	0
Alvan Williams	Wales	FW	1956–1957	16	—N/a	16	7
William Dallas	Scotland	HB	1957–1958	8	—N/a	8	0
John McTurk	Scotland	FB	1957	2	—N/a	2	0
Barry Smith	England	FW	1957–1958	22	—N/a	22	15
Joe Dignam	Scotland	FW	1957	8	—N/a	8	0
Ray Wilkins	England	FW	1957–1958	4	—N/a	4	2
George Warburton	Wales	FB	1958–1960	24	—N/a	24	0
Elfyn Williams	Wales	FW	1959	2	—N/a	2	0
Eric Beesley	England	HB	1959	1	—N/a	1	0
Bert Scott	Scotland	FW	1959	2	—N/a	2	0
Idris Pryce	Wales	FW	1959	3	—N/a	3	0
George Porter	Wales	FW	1959	1	—N/a	1	0
David Proctor	Northern Ireland	HB	1959	3	—N/a	3	0
Barry Wright	Wales	FB	1959–1961	13	—N/a	13	0
Harvey Jones	Wales	HB	1959–1960	17	—N/a	17	0
Gareth Salisbury	Wales	FW	1960–1962	18	—N/a	18	0
Len Willett	Wales	HB	1960	1	—N/a	1	0
Archie Styles	England	HB	1960–1961	20	—N/a	20	1
Harvey McCreadie	Scotland	FW	1960–1961	14	—N/a	14	2
Elfed Morris	Wales	FW	1961–1962	14	—N/a	14	8
Billy White	England	FW	1961	8	—N/a	8	0
Terry Bennett	England	GK	1961	1	—N/a	1	0
Derek Hughes	Wales	FW	1962	1	—N/a	1	0
Bob Thomas	Wales	HB	1962	1	—N/a	1	0
Tommy Anderson	Scotland	FW	1962	15	—N/a	15	3
Wally Bellett	England	FB	1962	2	—N/a	2	0
Kenny Simpkins	Wales	GK	1962–1963	5	—N/a	5	0
Don Parrish	England	FW	1963–1965	5	—N/a	5	0
Roy Thurnham	England	HB	1963	3	—N/a	3	0
Alan Jones	Wales	GK	1963–1964	23	—N/a	23	0
Aled Owen	Wales	FW	1963–1964	4	—N/a	4	0
David Lambert	Wales	FB	1963	5	—N/a	5	0
Graham Bent	Wales	FW	1963–1964	12	—N/a	12	2
Jimmy McGill	Scotland	FB	1963–1964	20	—N/a	20	0
Albert Dunlop	England	GK	1963–1965	18	—N/a	18	0
Norrie Gillespie	Scotland	FW	1963–1964	3	—N/a	3	0
Dennis Lambourne	Wales	FW	1964–1965	15	—N/a	15	4
Alan Jones	Wales	FW	1964	2	—N/a	2	0
Haydn Jones	Wales	FB	1965–1966	18	2	20	0
Robert Butt	England	FW	1965	3	—N/a	3	0
Cledwyn Roberts	Wales	HB	1965	1	0	1	0
Dave Harding	Australia	MF	1965–1966	11	1	12	1
Peter Wall	England	DF	1965–1966	16	7	23	1
David Rawlins	Wales	FW	1965	2	0	2	0
Ben Hannigan	Republic of Ireland	FW	1965–1966	8	0	8	2
Johnny Edwards	Wales	GK	1965	1	0	1	0
Graham Beighton	England	GK	1966	23	0	23	0
John Lloyd	Wales	FW	1966–1967	2	0	2	0
Ian Hughes	Wales	FW	1966	9	0	9	3
John Wood	England	DF	1966–1968	6	4	10	0
David Grant	England	HB	1966–1967	8	6	14	0
Geoff Lloyd	Wales	FW	1966–1967	14	2	16	6
Ray Booth	Wales	MF	1967–1969	5	0	5	0
Phil Jones	England	FW	1967	1	0	1	0
Pat Kinsella	England	MF	1967	1	0	1	0
Dennis Reeves	Scotland	GK	1967–1969	17	0	17	0
Graham Jones	Wales	DF	1968	4	0	4	0
Ray Charnley	England	FW	1968–1969	22	2	24	7
Bernard Purdie	Wales	FW	1968–1970	10	3	13	3
Steve Mackreth	Wales	DF	1969	1	1	2	0
Joey Duncan	England	FW	1969	1	0	1	0
John Sykes	England	FW	1969	1	0	1	0
Brian Price	Wales	MF	1970	1	0	1	0
Phil Boersma	England	MF	1970	4	3	7	0
Colin Green	Wales	DF	1971	3	0	3	0
David Hughes	Wales	MF	1971	1	0	1	0
Ken Taylor	Wales	DF	1971	1	0	1	0
Bob Scott	England	DF	1971–1976; 1986	19	5	24	0
Roger Mostyn	Wales	FW	1972–1973	18	4	22	7
John Loughlan	Scotland	DF	1972	6	0	6	0
Mike Williams	Wales	MF	1975–1978	11	0	11	0
Jimmy Kelly	Northern Ireland	MF	1975	4	0	4	0
Everton Williams	Jamaica	FW	1975	1	1	2	0
John McLaughlin	England	MF	1977	1	0	1	0
Peter Williams	Wales	FW	1978–1981	7	11	18	1
Tony Larkin	England	DF	1978	1	1	2	0
David Palmer	England	DF/MF	1978	0	1	1	0
Ian Roberts	Wales	MF	1979	2	6	8	0
Elfyn Edwards	Wales	DF	1979	1	0	1	0
Steve Jones	Wales	FW	1981–1982	4	4	8	0
Mark Jones	Wales	DF	1982	1	0	1	0
Dennis Leman	England	MF	1982	17	0	17	1
Mark Emmerson	England	MF	1982–1983	1	1	2	0
Steve Humphries	England	GK	1982	2	0	2	0
Medwyn Evans	Wales	MF	1982–1984	17	6	23	1
Drew Brand	Scotland	GK	1982	1	0	1	0
Kevin Bremner	Scotland	FW	1983	5	0	5	2
Steve Jones	Wales	DF	1983–1984	9	2	11	1
John Williams	Wales	DF	1983	0	1	1	0
Phil Coleman	England	DF	1983	20	0	20	3
Bob Wardle	England	GK	1983	14	0	14	0
Bobby Roberts	Scotland	MF	1983	1	0	1	0
Mike Sturridge	England	FW	1983	3	1	4	0
Grenville Millington	Wales	GK	1983–1984	14	0	14	0
Ronnie Sinclair	Scotland	GK	1984	16	0	16	0
Paul Nicholl	England	MF	1984	1	1	2	0
Gary Pugh	Wales	HB	1984	2	0	2	0
David Reilly	England	MF	1984–1985	0	2	2	0
Malcolm Crosby	England	MF	1984	5	1	6	0
Chris Sander	Wales	GK	1984	5	0	5	0
Peter Houghton	England	FW	1984–1985	5	0	5	2
Vernon Keep	England	MF	1984–1985	0	3	3	1
Steve Emery	England	MF/DF	1985–1986	10	1	11	0
John Vaughan	England	GK	1985	4	0	4	0
Mike Keen	Wales	GK	1985–1986	8	0	8	0
Brian Mooney	Republic of Ireland	MF	1985–1986	12	0	12	4
Phil Brignull	England	DF	1985–1986	6	0	6	1
Don Ferguson	Canada	GK	1986	22	0	22	0
Simon Chadwick	England	FW	1986	1	1	2	0
Darren Weetman	England	MF	1986	1	0	1	0
Brian Stanton	England	MF	1986	9	0	9	0
Ian Haigh	England	GK	1986	1	0	1	0
Barry Diamond	Scotland	FW	1987	4	2	6	0
Darren Heyes	England	GK	1987	3	0	3	0
David Powell	England	GK	1987	2	0	2	0
George Oghani	England	FW	1987	6	1	7	0
Jim Harvey	Northern Ireland	MF	1987	6	0	6	0
Jamie Slater	Wales	FW	1987	1	6	7	1
Robert Alleyne	England	FW	1987–1988	9	3	12	2
Ian Fairbrother	England	MF/DF	1987	10	0	10	0
Steve Scott	Wales	DF	1987	0	4	4	0
Jason Taylor	Wales	MF	1988	0	1	1	0
Mark Wrench	England	DF	1988–1989	5	1	6	0
Martin Lane	England	DF	1988	6	0	6	0
Paul Raynor	England	MF/FW	1988	6	0	6	0
Paul Jones	England	MF	1989	5	0	5	0
Martin Filson	England	DF	1989	0	2	2	0
Robert Barnes	England	DF	1989–1990	10	2	12	0
Tony Lee	England	FW	1989	0	1	1	0
Craig Madden	England	FW	1990	7	3	10	1
Robert Jones	England	MF	1990–1991	5	2	7	1
Eddie Youds	England	DF	1990	20	0	20	2
Alan Kennedy	England	DF	1990	22	2	24	0
Steve Morgan	Wales	MF	1990	8	0	8	1
Kevin Jones	Wales	DF	1990–1994	8	2	10	0
Dave O'Gorman	England	MF/FW	1990–1991	11	12	23	1
Ashley Ward	England	FW	1991	6	0	6	2
Robbie Lunt	England	MF	1991	1	8	9	0
Ian Griffiths	England	FW	1991	17	0	17	0
Joey Murray	England	MF	1991	14	0	14	0
Stewart Phillips	England	FW	1991	1	1	2	1
Peter Skipper	England	DF	1991	2	0	2	0
Colin Marshall	Scotland	DF	1991	4	0	4	0
David Jones	Wales	MF	1992	1	1	2	0
Simon Ireland	England	MF	1992	2	3	5	0
Dudley Lewis	Wales	DF	1992	8	1	9	0
Craig Knight	Wales	DF	1992	1	0	1	0
David Esdaille	England	MF	1992	6	1	7	0
Ken Hughes	Wales	GK	1992–1993	10	0	10	0
Stephen Pugh	Wales	FW	1992–1994	5	12	17	0
Jimmy Case	England	MF	1993	1	3	4	0
Mark Walton	Wales	GK	1993	6	0	6	0
Nick Richardson	England	MF	1994	4	0	4	2
Mike Quigley	England	MF	1995	4	0	4	0
Lewis Coady	England	MF	1995	2	0	2	0
Richard Barnes	Wales	DF	1995	0	2	2	0
Steve Futcher	England	MF/DF	1995	2	0	2	0
Andy Thomas	England	DF	1995	1	0	1	0
Jason Soloman	England	DF	1996	4	0	4	0
Paul Roberts	Wales	FW	1996–1997	0	2	2	0
Dave Gardner	England	MF	1997	0	1	1	0
Paul Jones	England	DF	1997	6	0	6	0
Neil Wainwright	England	MF	1997–1998	12	7	19	3
Ray Kelly	Republic of Ireland	FW	1997–1998	7	5	12	1
Steve Basham	England	FW	1998	5	1	6	0
Mark Wilson	England	MF	1998	16	1	17	7
Stephen Rishworth	England	MF	1998	0	4	4	0
Terry Cooke	England	MF	1998–1999	13	0	13	0
Jake Edwards	England	FW	1998–1999	6	15	21	4
Carl Griffiths	Wales	FW	1999	5	0	5	4
Tommy Wright	Northern Ireland	GK	1999	17	0	17	0
Stuart Elliott	England	MF/DF	1999	11	2	13	0
David Lowe	England	MF/FW	1999–2000	8	6	14	1
Mike Ryan	England	DF	1999	4	3	7	0
Ian Stevens	Malta	FW	1999–2000	20	4	24	8
Kevin Hannon	England	DF	1999–2000	2	2	4	0
Jason Jarrett	England	MF	1999–2000	4	0	4	0
Steve Cooper	Wales	DF	1999	1	1	2	0
Dave Warren	Republic of Ireland	FW	1999–2001	7	2	9	1
George Horan	England	DF	2000	0	1	1	0
David Sweet	Wales	FW	2000	0	1	1	0
Danny Allsopp	Australia	FW	2000	3	0	3	4
Chris Killen	New Zealand	FW	2000	13	1	14	5
Emad Bouanane	France	DF	2000–2001	20	4	24	0
Adrian Moody	England	DF	2000–2002	4	2	6	0
Paul Mardon	Wales	DF	2000	7	1	8	0
Gareth Williams	Wales	MF	2000	0	1	1	0
Willie Miller	Scotland	DF	2001	6	0	6	0
Mark Evans	England	DF	2001–2002	0	5	5	0
Keith Hill	England	DF	2001	15	0	15	1
Kevin Sharp	England	DF	2001–2002	13	3	16	1
Marius Røvde	Norway	GK	2002	12	0	12	0
Paul Whitfield	Wales	GK	2002–2004	15	4	19	0
Armand Oné	France	FW	2003	2	1	3	0
Jimmy McNulty	Scotland	DF	2003	0	1	1	0
Matt Baker	England	GK	2004	17	2	19	0
Matthew Shaw	England	FW	2004	0	1	1	0
Xavi Valero	Spain	GK	2005	4	0	4	0
Jamie Reed	Wales	FW	2005–2007	0	9	9	0
Michael Jones	England	GK	2005–2008	12	2	14	0
Robbie Foy	Scotland	MF	2005–2006	8	12	20	3
Paul Warhurst	England	DF	2005–2006	6	6	12	1
Paul Linwood	England	DF	2005	8	1	9	0
Sam Williams	England	FW	2006	17	1	18	2
Matt Derbyshire	England	FW	2006	17	0	17	10
Jon Newby	England	FW	2006	2	11	13	0
John McAliskey	England	FW	2006	4	0	4	0
Tom Craddock	England	FW	2006	1	0	1	1
Maheta Molango	Switzerland	FW	2006	4	0	4	0
Kevin Smith	Scotland	FW	2006–2007	7	3	10	2
Paul Mitchell	England	MF	2007	5	0	5	0
Robert Garrett	Northern Ireland	MF	2007–2008	20	3	23	0
Cherno Samba	Gambia	FW	2007	1	2	3	0
Scott Barron	England	DF/MF	2007	3	0	3	0
John Ruddy	England	GK	2007	5	0	5	0
Michael Carvill	Northern Ireland	FW/MF	2007–2008	8	8	16	1
Richard Walker	England	DF	2007	3	0	3	0
Eifion Williams	Wales	FW/MF	2007	10	6	16	1
Conall Murtagh	Northern Ireland	MF	2007–2008	4	2	6	0
Matthew Collins	Wales	MF	2007	3	0	3	0
Phil Bolland	England	DF	2008	19	0	19	0
Paul Hall	Jamaica	MF/FW	2008	7	4	11	1
Danny Sonner	Northern Ireland	MF	2008	9	0	9	1
Stuart Nicholson	England	FW	2008	9	4	13	0
Drewe Broughton	England	FW	2008	16	0	16	2
Robert Duffy	Wales	FW	2008	0	6	6	0
Nat Brown	England	DF	2008	6	1	7	0
Simon Brown	England	MF	2008	10	5	15	2
Tom Kearney	England	MF	2008–2009	15	4	19	1
Darran Kempson	England	DF	2008–2009	15	1	16	0
Shaun Whalley	England	MF/FW	2008	16	3	19	4
Kyle Critchell	Wales	DF/MF	2008	2	0	2	0
Joe Allen	Wales	MF	2008	2	0	2	1
Obi Anoruo	Nigeria	FW	2008–2012	6	18	24	2
Ritchie De Laet	Belgium	DF	2008	4	0	4	0
Angelos Tsiaklis	Cyprus	MF	2008–2009	8	0	8	0
Nathan Woolfe	England	FW	2008–2009	12	2	14	1
Patrick Suffo	Cameroon	FW	2008–2009	3	16	19	2
Steve Abbott	England	FW	2008–2009	1	2	3	0
Christian Gyan	Ghana	DF	2009	2	0	2	0
Jamie McCluskey	Scotland	MF	2009–2010	11	13	24	0
Andrew Crofts	Wales	MF	2009	18	0	18	1
Aurélien Collin	France	DF	2009	11	2	13	0
John Curtis	England	DF/MF	2009	13	0	13	0
Matt Jansen	England	FW	2009	3	0	3	1
Gunnar Nielsen	Faroe Islands	GK	2009	5	0	5	0
Sam Russell	England	GK	2009–2010	20	0	20	0
Hedi Taboubi	France	MF	2009–2010	12	2	14	1
Matthew Wolfenden	England	FW/MF	2009–2010	5	12	17	1
Lamine Sakho	Senegal	MF/FW	2009–2010	17	4	21	1
Luke Holden	England	MF	2010	13	2	15	1
Aaron Brown	England	DF	2010	8	0	8	0
Danny Mitchley	England	FW	2010	3	3	6	0
Kristian O'Leary	Wales	MF	2010	8	0	8	0
David Brown	England	FW	2010–2011	8	3	11	2
Kevin Gall	Wales	MF/FW	2010	3	2	5	0
Scott Shearer	Scotland	GK	2010	9	0	9	0
Jordan McMillan	Scotland	DF	2011	4	1	5	0
Louis Moss	Barbados	FW	2011	2	2	4	2
Rob Salathiel	Wales	MF/FW	2011	1	1	2	0
Anthony Stephens	England	DF	2011–2015	6	3	9	0
Paul Carney	Wales	MF	2011	0	1	1	0
Jay Colbeck	England	MF	2011–2013	6	9	15	4
Max Fargin	Wales	FW	2011	1	0	1	0
Jamie Morton	England	MF	2011	1	0	1	0
Matty Owen	Wales	MF	2011	1	0	1	0
Kyle Parle	Wales	DF	2011–2014	2	2	4	0
Jonathan Royle	Wales	DF/MF	2011–2015	1	2	3	0
**Danny Ward**	Wales	GK	2011; 2025–	10	0	10	0
Daniel Alfei	Wales	DF	2012–2013	21	0	21	0
Steve Leslie	Scotland	MF/DF	2012	10	3	13	1
Nick Rushton	Wales	FW	2012–2014	12	12	24	5
Danny Devine	Northern Ireland	DF	2012	8	0	8	0
Bradley Reid	Wales	FW	2012–2016	6	10	16	1
Kevin Thornton	Republic of Ireland	MF	2013–2014	16	5	21	6
Dele Adebola	Nigeria	FW	2013	10	6	16	2
Théophile N'Tamé	Cameroon	DF	2013	5	2	7	1
Danny Livesey	England	DF	2014	16	0	16	0
Danny Reynolds	Wales	FW	2014	0	2	2	0
Joe Williams	Wales	FW	2014	0	3	3	0
Daniel Bachmann	Austria	GK	2014–2015	18	0	18	0
Ross White	Wales	DF	2014–2016	20	4	24	1
Dan Holman	England	FW	2014	0	4	4	0
James Pearson	England	DF	2014–2015	9	1	10	0
Jonathan Flatt	England	GK	2014–2015	7	0	7	0
Scott Tancock	Wales	DF	2014	2	0	2	0
Joe Thompson	England	MF	2014	1	0	1	0
Luke Waterfall	England	DF	2015	12	2	14	1
Kieron Morris	England	MF	2015	12	1	13	4
Kyle Storer	England	MF	2015	11	2	13	1
Sam Finley	England	MF	2015	11	3	14	0
Corey Roper	England	MF	2015	0	3	3	0
Cameron Belford	England	GK	2015	20	0	20	0
Joel Logan	England	MF	2015	0	3	3	0
Javan Vidal	England	DF/MF	2015–2016	21	3	24	2
Mason Watkins-Clarke	England	DF	2015	1	0	1	0
Adam Smith	England	MF	2015	2	10	12	1
Jon Nolan	England	MF	2015	3	3	6	0
Joe Quigley	Republic of Ireland	FW	2015	2	2	4	1
Liam Walsh	Wales	DF/MF	2015	0	1	1	0
James Caton	England	MF	2015	0	4	4	0
Danny O'Brien	England	MF	2015	0	3	3	0
John Cofie	England	FW	2015	1	2	3	0
Simon Heslop	England	MF	2016	20	0	20	3
Jonny Smith	England	MF	2016	0	2	2	0
Mark Beck	Scotland	FW	2016	7	4	11	0
Louis Briscoe	England	FW/MF	2016	0	4	4	0
Ryan O'Reilly	Republic of Ireland	DF	2016	0	1	1	0
Michael Bakare	England	MF	2016	3	5	8	0
Shaun Harrad	England	FW	2016	16	5	21	4
Tyler Harvey	England	MF/FW	2016	10	3	13	0
Gerry McDonagh	Republic of Ireland	FW	2016–2017	16	8	24	5
Nortei Nortey	England	MF	2016	1	5	6	0
Brandon Burrows	England	MF	2016–2017	0	2	2	0
Khaellem Bailey-Nicholls	England	FW	2016	0	3	3	0
Luke Coddington	England	GK	2016–2017	10	0	10	0
George Harry	England	FW	2016–2017	2	3	5	1
Izale McLeod	England	FW	2017	13	2	15	1
Russell Penn	England	MF	2017	16	0	16	0
Ollie Shenton	England	MF	2017	14	3	17	1
Mitchell Lund	England	DF	2017	4	0	4	0
Iffy Allen	England	MF	2017	3	4	7	0
Olly Marx	England	DF	2017	9	0	9	0
James Hurst	England	DF	2017–2018	8	11	19	0
Alex Reid	England	FW	2017	14	4	18	3
Callum Preston	Wales	GK	2017	1	0	1	0
George Miller	England	FW	2017–2018	5	1	6	0
Cameron McGregor	England	FW/MF	2017	0	1	1	0
Ferdinand Takyi	Germany	FW	2017	0	1	1	0
Doug Tharme	England	DF	2017–2019	7	2	9	0
Ryan Williams	Wales	DF	2017	1	0	1	0
Scott Quigley	England	FW	2018	16	1	17	8
David Raven	England	DF	2018	5	2	7	0
Jonathan Franks	England	MF/FW	2018	2	5	7	0
Simon Ainge	England	DF/FW	2018	1	9	10	0
Jordan Maguire-Drew	England	MF	2018	14	5	19	3
Scott Burgess	England	MF	2018	0	2	2	0
Matt Sargent	Wales	MF	2018–2019	1	1	2	0
Cole Stockton	England	FW	2019	2	7	9	1
Jermaine McGlashan	England	MF	2019	3	5	8	1
Kemy Agustien	Curaçao	MF	2019	3	0	3	0
Anthony Spyrou	England	FW	2019	2	1	3	0
Jack Thorn	Wales	MF	2019	0	1	1	0
JJ Hooper	England	MF/FW	2019–2020	18	4	22	7
Leighton McIntosh	Scotland	MF/FW	2019	5	8	13	3
Michael Chambers	England	DF	2019	14	1	15	0
Jazzi Barnum-Bobb	Saint Vincent and the Grenadines	DF	2019	13	0	13	0
Adam Barton	Republic of Ireland	MF	2019	10	1	11	0
Bobby Beaumont	Wales	DF	2019	3	1	4	0
Matthew Jones	Wales	MF	2019	2	2	4	0
Dawid Szczepaniak	Poland	GK	2019	1	0	1	0
Cian Williams	Wales	DF	2019	0	2	2	0
Calum Huxley	England	FW	2019	0	2	2	0
Kyle Robinson-Murray	England	MF	2019	1	1	2	0
James Horsfield	England	DF	2019; 2020–2021	18	4	22	0
Omari Patrick	England	MF/FW	2019–2020	7	3	10	5
Tyler Reid	England	DF	2019–2020	5	2	7	0
**Davis Keillor-Dunn**	England	MF	2020; 2026–	3	12	15	1
Jordon Thompson	England	DF	2020	5	0	5	0
Tyler Garratt	England	DF	2020	3	0	3	0
Kyle Barker	England	MF	2020	0	1	1	0
Anthony Jeffrey	Guyana	MF	2020	4	5	9	0
Adi Yussuf	Tanzania	FW	2020–2021	9	8	17	5
Keanu Marsh-Brown	Guyana	MF	2021	1	2	3	0
Gold Omotayo	Switzerland	FW	2021	10	1	11	3
Chris Sang	England	FW	2021	1	2	3	0
Cameron Green	England	DF	2021–2022	8	7	15	1
Jake Hyde	England	FW	2021–2022	11	6	17	3
David Jones	England	MF	2021–2023	2	3	5	1
Harry Lennon	England	DF	2021–2023	22	1	23	2
Shaun Brisley	England	DF	2021	5	0	5	1
Kai Evans	Wales	MF	2021–2022	0	2	2	0
Ryan Austin	Wales	DF	2023	0	1	1	0
Scott Butler	Wales	DF	2023	1	0	1	0
**Aaron James**	England	DF	2023–	7	2	9	1
Billy Waters	England	FW	2023–2025	3	5	8	0
Harry Ashfield	Wales	MF	2023–2026	5	4	9	2
Luke McNicholas	Republic of Ireland	GK	2023–2025	3	0	3	0
Dan Davies	Wales	DF	2023	1	0	1	0
Owen Cushion	England	MF	2023	0	1	1	0
Luke Bolton	England	MF/DF	2024–2025	8	12	20	0
**Callum Burton**	England	GK	2024–	10	0	10	0
**Mo Faal**	Gambia	FW	2024–	7	9	16	3
Jón Daði Böðvarsson	Iceland	FW	2024–2025	3	4	7	0
Josh Adam	Scotland	MF	2024–2025	2	0	2	0
Brad Foster	England	GK	2024–2025	1	0	1	0
**Liberato Cacace**	New Zealand	DF	2025–	9	4	13	1
Conor Coady	England	DF	2025–2026	6	0	6	0
**Ryan Hardie**	Scotland	FW	2025–	4	6	10	1
**Zak Vyner**	Kenya	DF	2026–	14	4	18	0
**Bailey Cadamarteri**	Jamaica	FW	2026–	0	9	9	0
**Danny Imray**	England	DF	2026–	7	6	13	1
**Ben Whiteman**	England	MF	2026–	13	2	15	1
**Anthony Patterson**	England	GK	2026–	15	0	15	0
**Jacques Ekomié**	Gabon	DF	2026–	12	1	13	2
**Callum O'Hare**	England	MF	2026–	7	1	8	0
**Joe Worrall**	England	DF	2026–	7	0	7	2
