= List of Wrexham A.F.C. players =

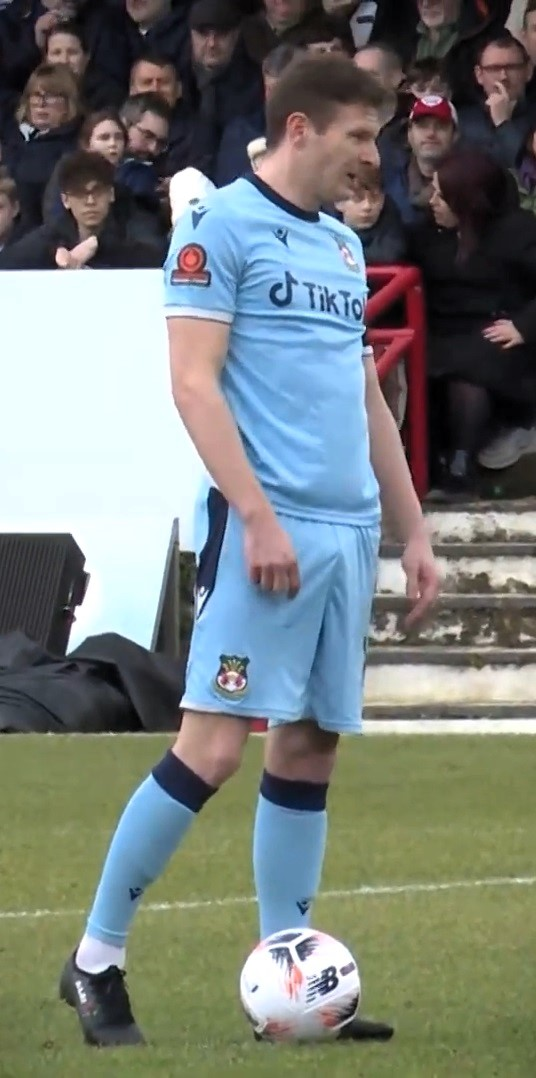
Paul Mullin made 172 appearances for The Red Dragons, scoring 110 goals in the process.

Wrexham Association Football Club is an association football club based in Wrexham, Wales. Founded in October 1864, it is the oldest football club in Wales and the third-oldest professional association football team in the world. After playing in the Combination and regional leagues for several years, Wrexham joined the Football League shortly after the First World War, as a founding member of the new Third Division North. The club remained in the Football League for over 85 years, before they were relegated to the National League in 2008. They remained in the fifth tier of English football for the next 15 seasons, missing out on promotion through the play-offs on five occasions. Wrexham achieved three promotions in three seasons, from 2022 to 2025, through winning the 2022–23 National League, finishing runner-up in the 2023–24 EFL League Two and also in the 2024–25 EFL League One. Thus, Wrexham secured a spot in the EFL Championship, and became the first club across the top five tiers of English football to achieve three consecutive promotions.

Wrexham's first team has competed in numerous nationally and internationally organised competitions. As of the end of the 2023–24 season, a total of 209 players have appeared in 100 or more such matches for the club. Arfon Griffiths holds the record for the greatest number of appearances for Wrexham. In two spells between 1959 and 1979, the Welsh winger played 721 times in all competitions for the club. As of 2001, eleven other players have made more than 400 appearances for Wrexham. The club's goalscoring record is held by Tommy Bamford, who scored 209 goals in all competitions between 1929 and 1934. To date, Bamford is the only player to have scored 200 goals for Wrexham. He also holds the club records for most goals in a season (51 in 1933–34) and most goals per game (0.855). Ten players on this list went on to manage Wrexham – Ken Barnes, Arfon Griffiths, Mel Sutton, Dixie McNeil, Brian Flynn, Joey Jones, Brian Carey, Andy Morrell, Dean Keates and Bryan Hughes.

== Key ==
- The list is ordered first by date of debut, and then if necessary in alphabetical order by surname.
- Appearances as a substitute are included. This feature of the game was introduced in the Football League at the start of the 1965–66 season.

Positions key
Pre-1960s		1960s–	
GK	Goalkeeper		
FB	Full-back	DF	Defender
HB	Half-back	MF	Midfielder
FW	Forward		

Nationality
Unless otherwise noted, the nationality of a player is determined by the country/countries which he has played for, or if said person has not played international football, their country of birth.
Position
Playing positions are listed according to the tactical formations that were employed at the time. Thus, the change in the names of defensive and midfield positions reflects the tactical evolution that occurred from the 1960s onwards.
Club career
Club career is defined as the first and last calendar years in which the player appeared for the club in any of the competitions listed below.
Total appearances and Total goals
Total appearances and goals comprise those in the Combination, Welsh Senior League, Birmingham & District League, English Football League, National League, FA Cup, EFL Cup, Welsh Cup, FA Trophy, EFL Trophy, UEFA Cup Winners' Cup and Scottish Challenge Cup. Matches in wartime competitions are excluded.

== Players ==
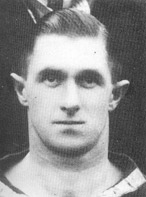
Gordon Gunson made 149 appearances across two spells with Wrexham in the 1920s and 1930s.

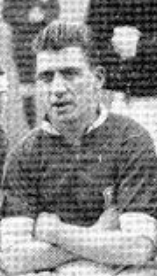
Billy Rogers played 197 times for Wrexham during a six-season tenure.

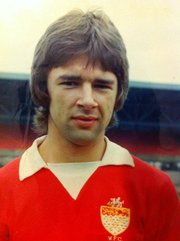
Alan Hill appeared 267 times for Wrexham between 1975 and 1983, winning the Third Division title in 1978.

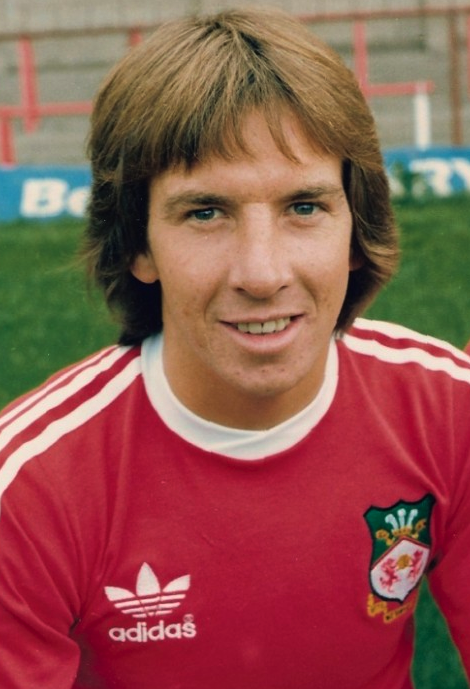
John Lyons started his career at Wrexham in 1975 and played for the club 115 times.

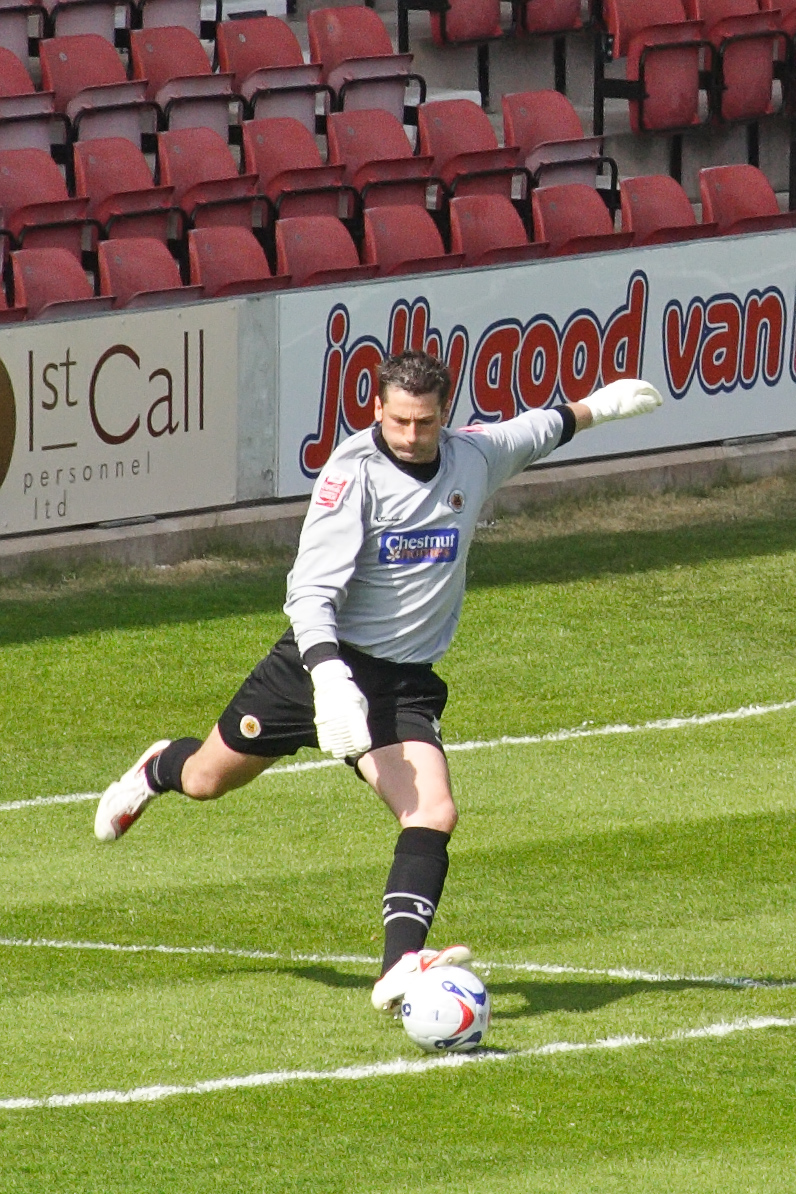
Andy Marriott is the goalkeeper with the second-most appearances at Wrexham, with 269 appearances in the 1990s.

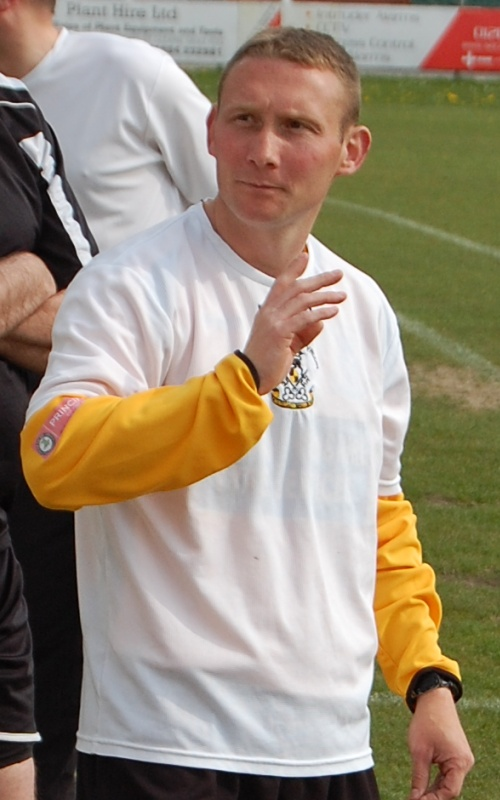
Deryn Brace played 118 times for Wrexham.

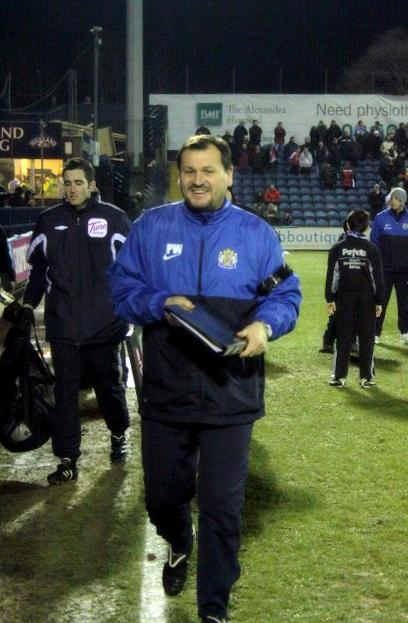
Peter Ward ended his playing career with Wrexham, appearing 161 times for the club.

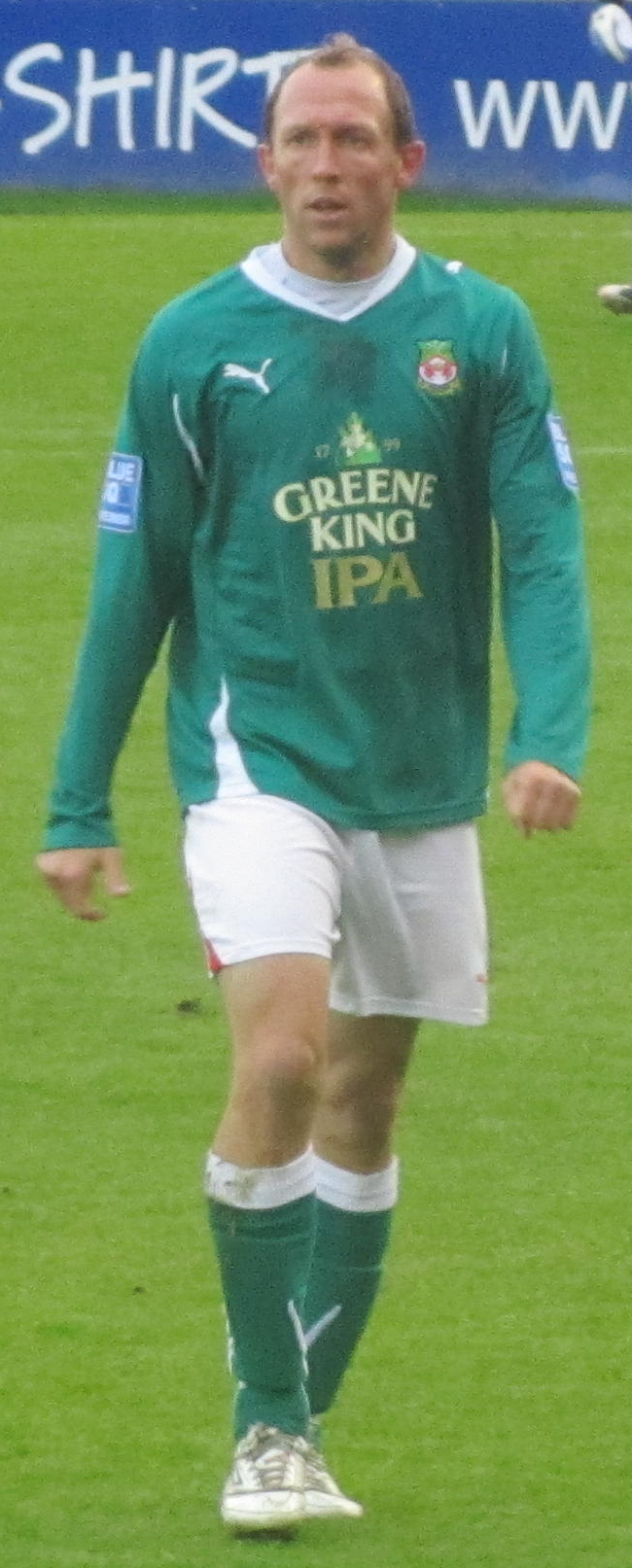
Andy Morrell is Wrexham's 11th highest goalscorer of all time, with 96 goals.

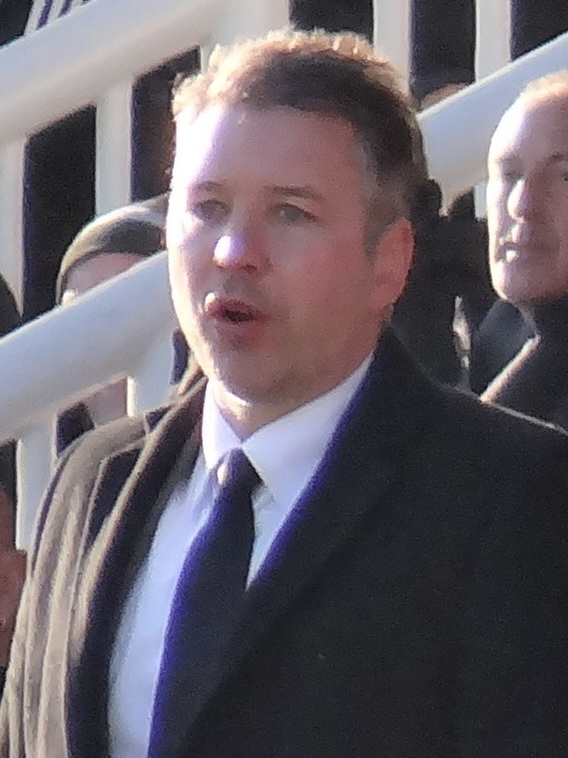
Darren Ferguson was captain when Wrexham won the EFL Trophy for the first time in 2005.

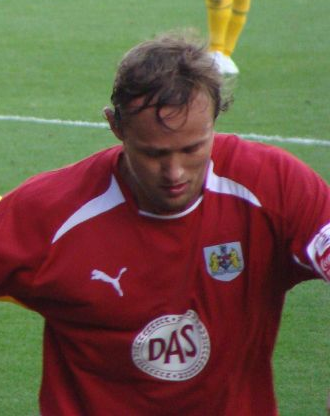
Lee Trundle was a mainstay during the 2001–02 and 2002–03 seasons, making a total of 111 appearances for the club.

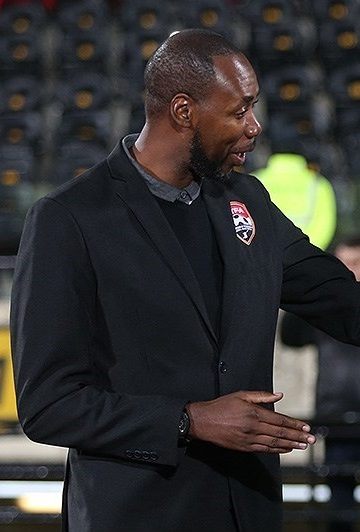
Dennis Lawrence has the most appearances of any non-European player for Wrexham.

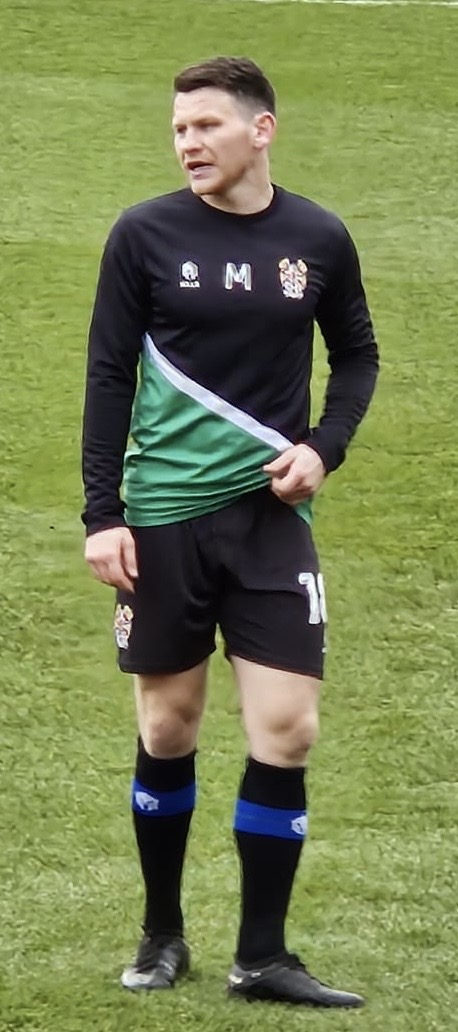
Connor Jennings played over 100 times for Wrexham over the course of just two seasons.

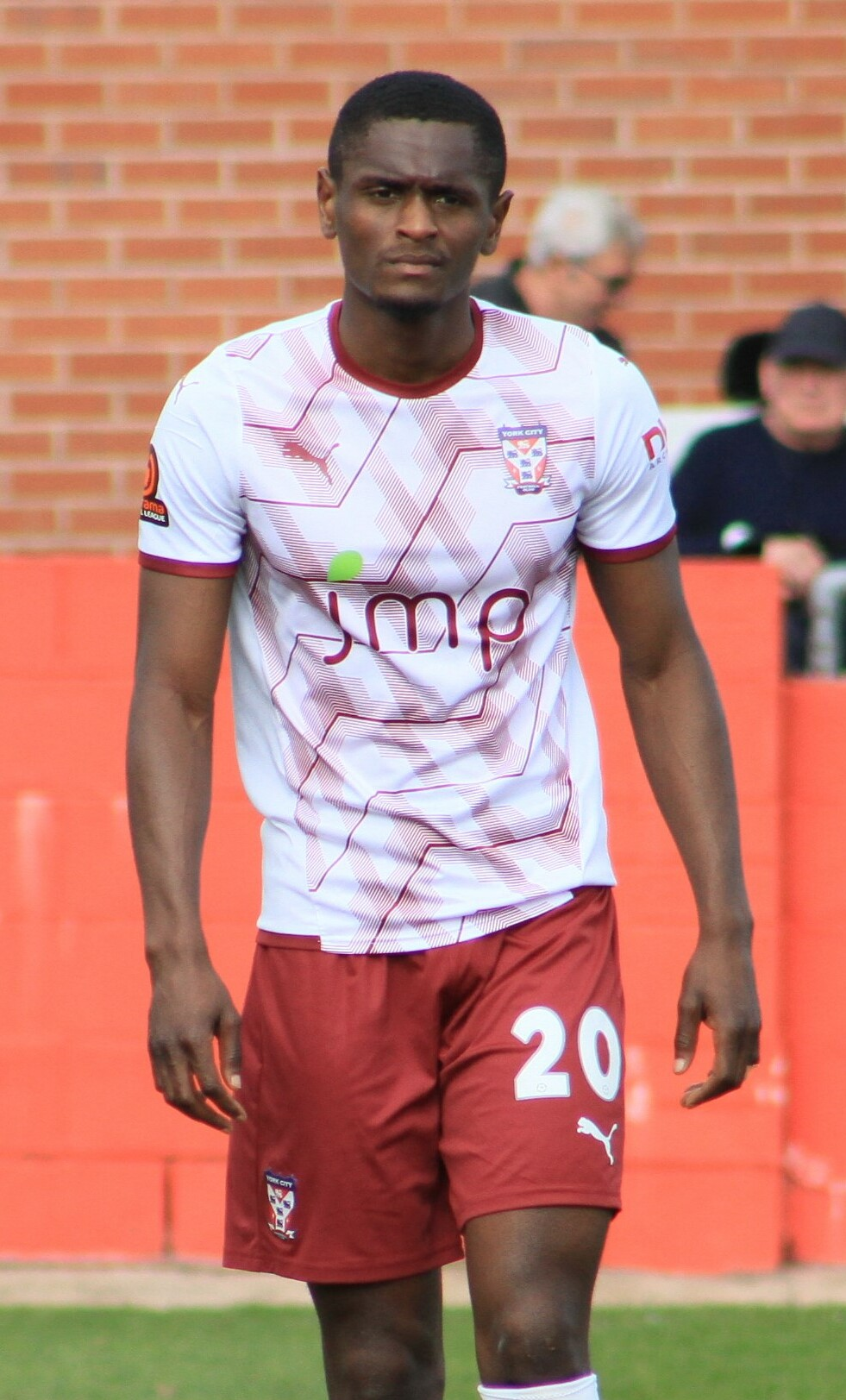
Akil Wright played 102 times during three years at Wrexham, initially as a loanee.

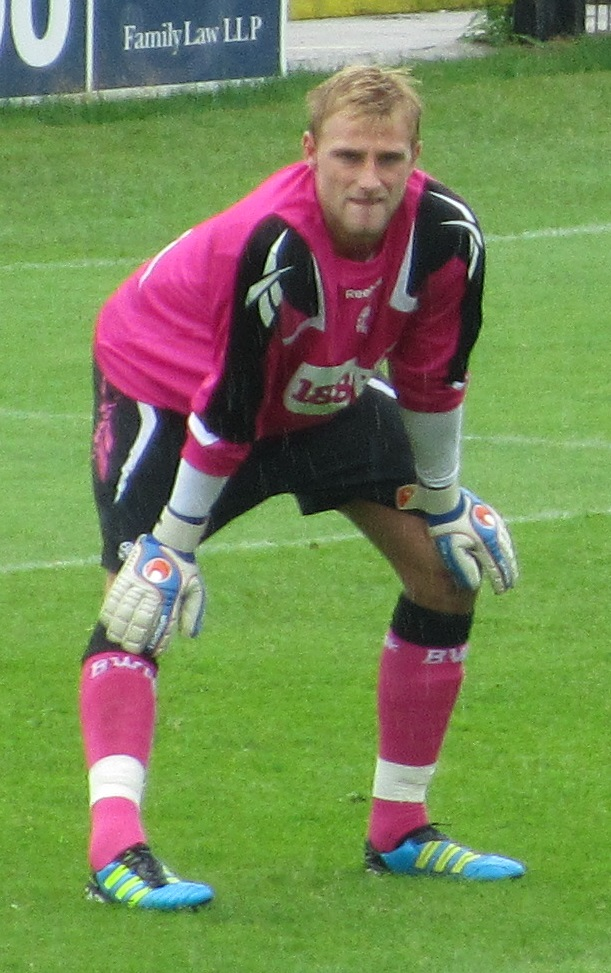
Goalkeeper Rob Lainton made 143 appearances between 2018 and 2023.

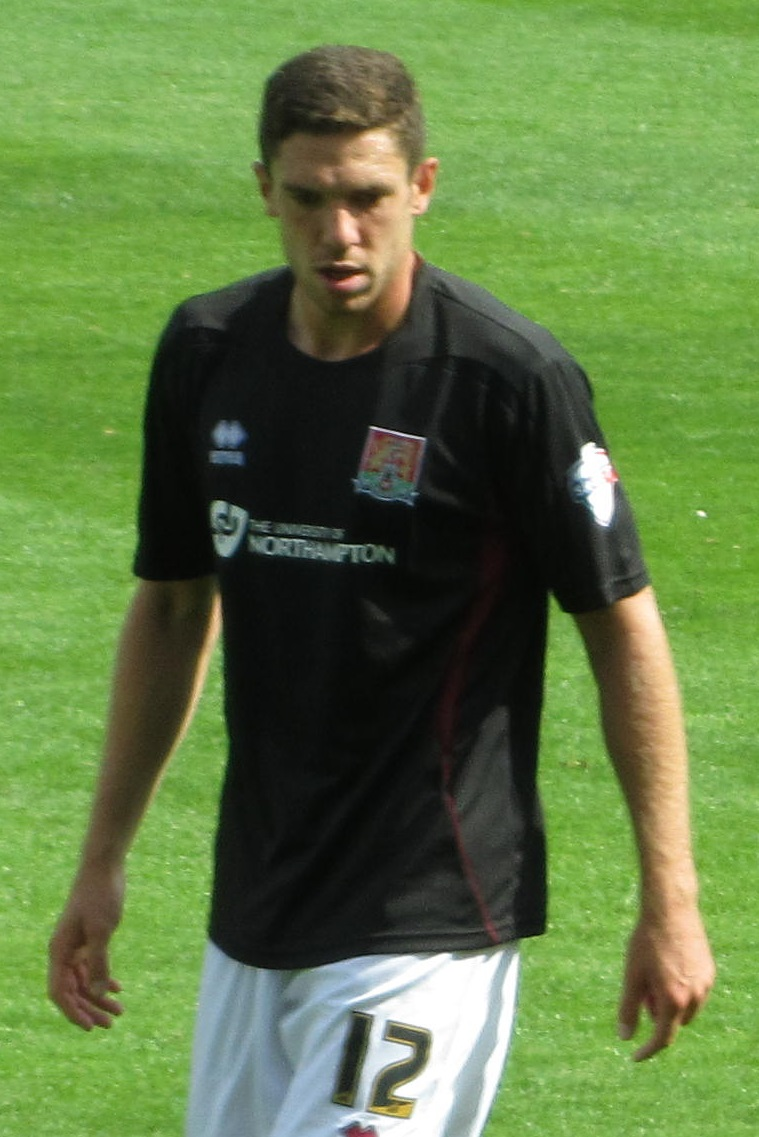
Ben Tozer made 141 appearances for Wrexham over a three-year period.

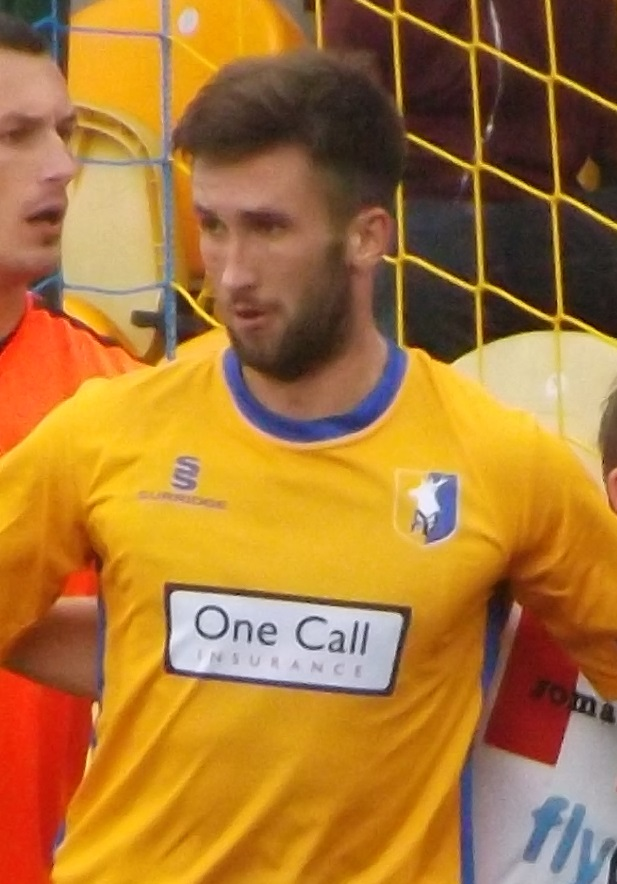
Ollie Palmer played 156 games for Wrexham between 2022 and 2025, scoring 46 times in all competitions.

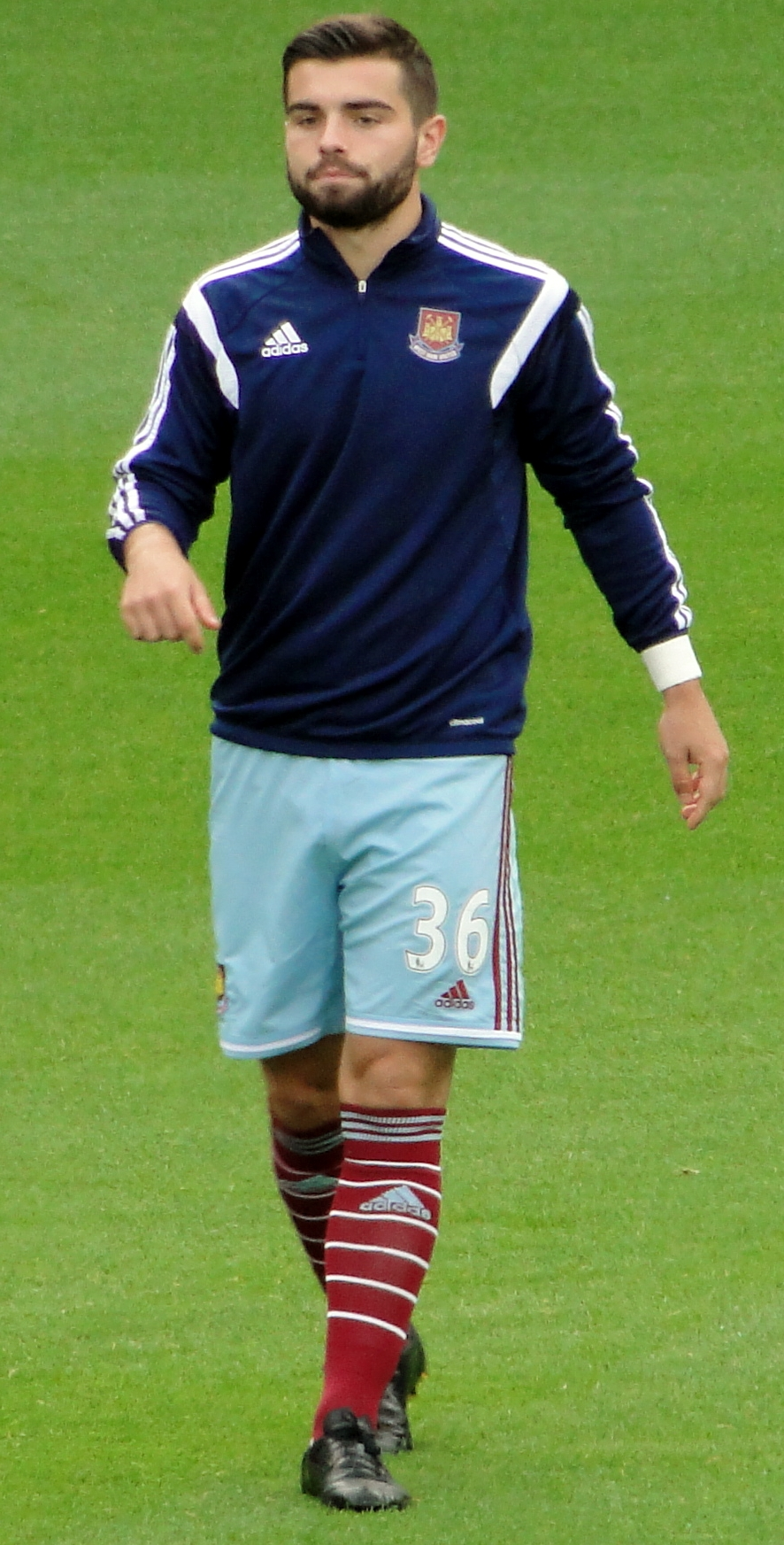
Elliot Lee passed 100 appearances for Wrexham in April 2024.

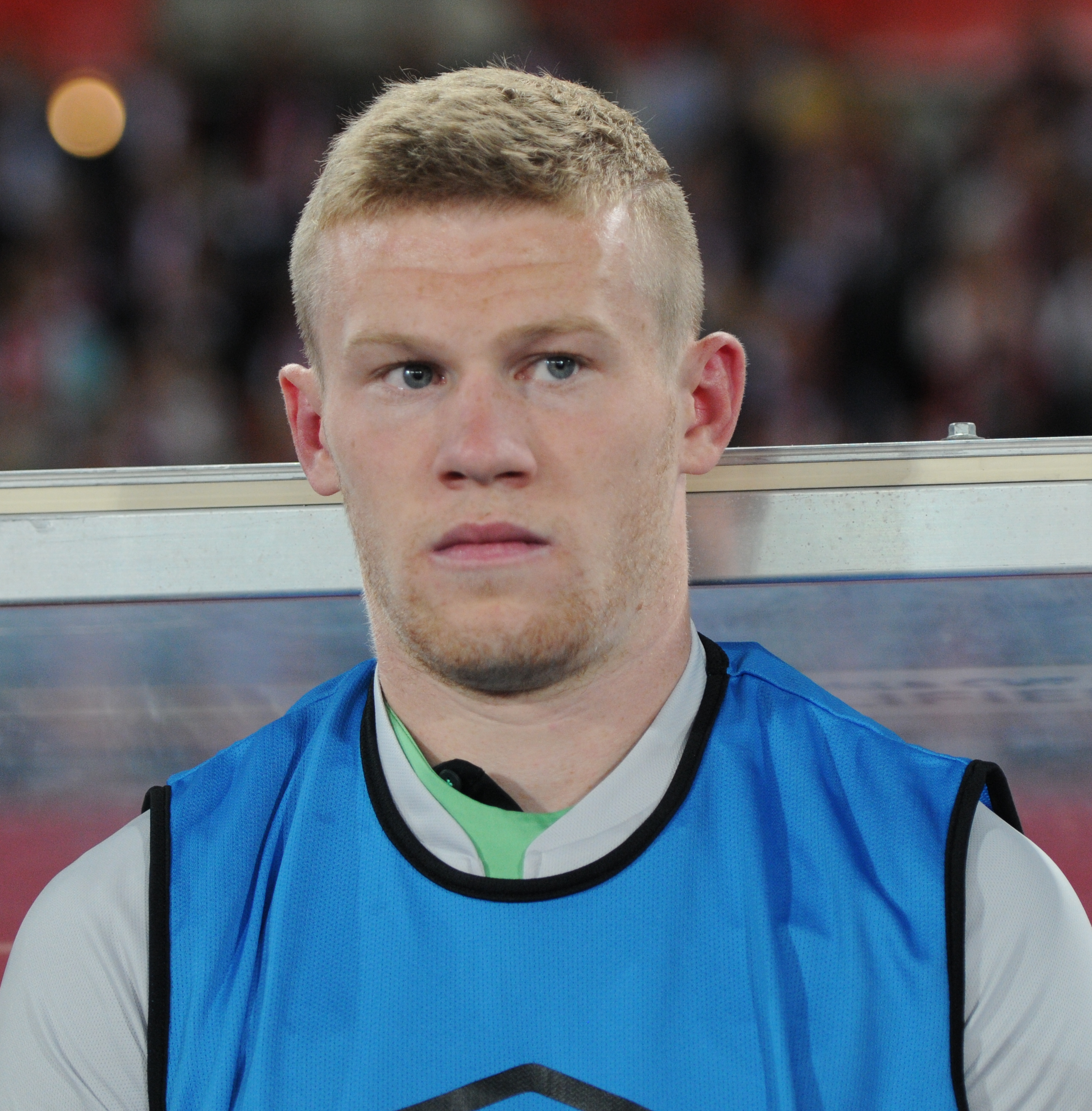
James McClean passed 100 appearances for Wrexham in November 2025.

As of game played 7 November 2026

Players highlighted in bold are still actively playing at Wrexham.

List of Wrexham A.F.C. players with 100 or more appearances
Player	Nationality	Pos	Club career	Starts	Subs	Total	Goals
Player	Nationality	Pos	Club career	Appearances			Goals
Horace Blew	Wales	FB	1899–1911	142	—N/a	142	0
Llewelyn Griffiths	Wales	FW	1899–1908	106	—N/a	106	49
Llewelyn Davies	Wales	FB	1901–1919	309	—N/a	309	11
Ernie Huffadine	Wales	HB	1906–1915	370	—N/a	370	7
Pryce Williams	Wales	HB	1907–1909; 1910–1915	264	—N/a	264	17
Fred Cook	England	FW	1908–1915	214	—N/a	214	20
George Devaney	England	GK	1910–1915	195	—N/a	195	0
Bertram Goode	England	FW	1910–1926	275	—N/a	275	148
Tommy Matthias	Wales	HB	1912–1928	389	—N/a	389	26
Edward Roberts	Wales	HB	1919–1923	130	—N/a	130	9
Noel Edwards	Wales	FB/FW	1919–1926	174	—N/a	174	43
George Godding	Wales	GK	1919; 1921–1926	188	—N/a	188	0
Bobby Simpson	England	FB	1919–1922	104	—N/a	104	0
Billy Cotton	England	FW	1921–1924	106	—N/a	106	47
Ted Regan	Wales	HB	1921–1928	216	—N/a	216	15
George Savage	England	HB	1922–1925	127	—N/a	127	2
Dick Finnigan	Wales	GK	1923–1924; 1929–1932	118	—N/a	118	0
Alfred Jones	England	FB	1923–1936	581	—N/a	581	6
Archie Longmuir	Scotland	FW	1924–1930	254	—N/a	254	39
Bert Lumberg	Wales	FB	1925–1930	190	—N/a	190	0
Bob Graham	England	HB	1926–1930	146	—N/a	146	3
Gordon Gunson	England	FW	1926–1929; 1935–1936	149	—N/a	149	45
Billy Rogers	Wales	HB	1926–1932	197	—N/a	197	29
Roland Woodhouse	England	FW	1927–1930	129	—N/a	129	27
Tommy Bamford	Wales	FW	1929–1934	241	—N/a	241	209
Jack Hughes	England	FW	1930–1939	103	—N/a	103	19
Tommy Lewis	England	FW	1930–1933	121	—N/a	121	45
Jack Mustard	England	FW	1930–1932; 1935–1936	103	—N/a	103	22
Matt Lawrence	Wales	HB	1930–1937	152	—N/a	152	4
Jim Bulling	England	HB	1932–1935	138	—N/a	138	4
George Frewin	England	FW	1932–1936	102	—N/a	102	34
Harry Waller	England	FW	1932–1935	108	—N/a	108	37
Hugh McMahon	Scotland	HB	1932–1936	165	—N/a	165	7
George Snow	England	FW	1933–1939	235	—N/a	235	47
Jimmy Hamilton	Scotland	FB	1933–1937	185	—N/a	185	1
Jack Lewis	Wales	HB	1933–1938	111	—N/a	111	2
Pat McMahon	Scotland	GK	1935–1939	126	—N/a	126	0
Archie Burgon	England	FW	1935–1939	160	—N/a	160	43
Eddie Tunney	England	FB	1937–1951	256	—N/a	256	0
Gib Bellis	Wales	HB	1938–1939; 1946–1949	104	—N/a	104	1
Ron Jackson	England	FB	1945–1949	122	—N/a	122	0
Norman Sharp	England	FW	1946–1949	133	—N/a	133	18
Jack Boothway	England	FW	1946–1950	112	—N/a	112	67
Les Speed	Wales	FB	1947–1955	242	—N/a	242	1
Billy Tunnicliffe	England	FW	1947–1953	265	—N/a	265	88
Bev Wilson	England	HB	1947–1950	109	—N/a	109	0
Dennis Grainger	England	FW	1947–1951	111	—N/a	111	13
Ron Wynn	Wales	HB	1948–1956	203	—N/a	203	17
Archie Ferguson	Scotland	GK	1948–1953	140	—N/a	140	0
George Spruce	England	HB	1948–1952	158	—N/a	158	3
Johnny Tapscott	England	HB	1950–1956	192	—N/a	192	5
George Jones	Wales	HB	1950–1953	128	—N/a	128	8
Tommy Bannan	Scotland	FW	1951–1959	260	—N/a	260	104
Ron Hewitt	Wales	FW	1951–1957; 1959–1960	267	—N/a	267	109
Albert Parker	England	FB	1951–1959	247	—N/a	247	1
Glyn Hughes	Wales	FW	1952–1955	107	—N/a	107	24
Gordon Richards	Wales	FW	1952–1958	107	—N/a	107	28
Ally McGowan	Scotland	FB	1953–1965	478	—N/a	478	2
Alan Fox	Wales	HB	1954–1964	412	—N/a	412	3
Bernard Evans	England	FW	1954–1960	126	—N/a	126	58
Fred Davis	England	HB	1955–1961	263	—N/a	263	14
Gren Jones	England	FW	1955–1961	281	—N/a	281	43
Billy Waters	Wales	GK	1955–1960	119	—N/a	119	0
John Anderson	Scotland	FW	1956–1959; 1961	116	—N/a	116	30
George Evans	Wales	HB	1957–1963	208	—N/a	208	10
Mike Metcalf	England	FW	1957–1963	144	—N/a	144	73
Arfon Griffiths	Wales	MF	1959–1961; 1962–1979	713	8	721	143
Reg Holland	England	FB	1960–1965	144	—N/a	144	0
Peter Jones	England	DF	1960–1966	271	0	271	8
Ken Barnes	England	HB	1961–1965	156	—N/a	156	30
Ron Barnes	England	FW	1961–1963	102	—N/a	102	29
Clive Colbridge	England	FW	1962–1965	133	—N/a	133	35
Ernie Phythian	England	FW	1962–1965	161	—N/a	161	48
David Powell	Wales	DF	1963–1968	152	2	154	5
Sammy McMillan	Northern Ireland	FW	1963–1967	170	0	170	61
Stuart Mason	England	DF	1966–1973	200	17	217	4
Steve Stacey	England	DF	1966–1968	115	4	119	6
Albert Kinsey	England	FW	1966–1973	292	8	300	100
Mickey Evans	Wales	DF	1966–1978	463	17	480	25
Steve Ingle	England	DF	1967–1972	172	6	178	8
Ray Smith	England	FW	1967–1972	193	15	208	71
Alan Bermingham	England	DF	1967–1970	134	3	137	2
Ian Moir	Scotland	MF	1968–1972; 1973–1975	189	11	200	25
Gareth Davies	Wales	DF	1968–1982	604	8	612	21
Eddie May	England	DF	1968–1976	406	4	410	43
Brian Tinnion	England	MF/FW	1969–1976	317	19	336	66
David Gaskell	England	GK	1969–1972	117	0	117	1
Bobby Park	Scotland	MF	1969–1972	121	4	125	9
Tom Vansittart	England	DF	1970–1975	99	2	101	2
Billy Ashcroft	England	FW	1970–1977	246	27	273	95
David Fogg	England	DF	1971–1976	198	4	202	1
Graham Whittle	England	FW	1971–1980	372	24	396	118
Brian Lloyd	Wales	GK	1971–1977	333	0	333	0
Mickey Thomas	Wales	MF	1972–1978; 1991–1993	331	18	349	43
Mel Sutton	England	MF	1972–1981	463	8	471	26
David Smallman	Wales	FW	1972–1975	122	3	125	51
Joey Jones	Wales	DF	1973–1975; 1978–1982; 1987–1992	476	3	479	22
Alan Dwyer	England	DF	1974–1981	227	13	240	7
Alan Hill	England	DF	1975–1983	236	31	267	8
John Lyons	Wales	FW	1975–1979	86	29	115	34
John Roberts	Wales	DF	1976–1980	191	2	193	5
Bobby Shinton	England	FW	1976–1979	177	0	177	58
Wayne Cegielski	Wales	DF	1976–1982	151	15	166	1
Les Cartwright	Wales	MF	1977–1981	150	4	154	14
Eddie Niedzwiecki	Wales	GK	1977–1983	143	0	143	0
Dai Davies	Wales	GK	1977–1981; 1985–1987	199	0	199	0
Dixie McNeil	England	FW	1977–1983; 1985	220	2	222	88
Steve Buxton	England	FW	1978–1984; 1986–1990	230	74	304	67
Steve Fox	England	MF	1978–1982	173	8	181	19
Mick Vinter	England	FW	1979–1982	117	15	132	42
Frank Carrodus	England	MF	1979–1982	116	1	117	8
Ian Arkwright	England	MF	1980–1984	132	3	135	11
Neil Salathiel	Wales	DF	1980; 1983–1990	324	1	325	3
Steve Dowman	England	DF	1981–1983	109	0	109	6
Simon Hunt	England	MF	1981–1984	133	9	142	24
David Gregory	England	FW	1982–1986	183	12	195	45
Andy Edwards	Wales	FW/MF	1982–1986	125	29	154	35
Jack Keay	Scotland	DF	1982–1986	199	0	199	11
Jake King	Scotland	DF	1982–1984	121	1	122	11
John Muldoon	England	MF/FW	1982–1985	91	28	119	16
Shaun Cunnington	England	MF/DF	1982–1988	267	3	270	17
Jim Steel	Scotland	FW	1983; 1984–1987	230	0	230	73
Barry Horne	Wales	MF	1984–1987	184	0	184	28
Mike Williams	Wales	DF	1984–1990	232	6	238	5
Steve Charles	England	MF	1984–1987	146	5	151	44
Paul Comstive	England	MF/DF	1984–1987	126	7	133	11
Mark Morris	England	GK	1986–1993	138	0	138	0
Roger Preece	England	MF/DF	1986–1990	116	26	142	15
Darren Wright	England	DF	1986–1990	140	10	150	9
Mike Salmon	England	GK	1987–1989	126	0	126	0
Geoff Hunter	England	MF	1987–1991	146	11	157	15
Kevin Russell	England	FW	1987–1989; 1995–2003	336	37	373	80
Jon Bowden	England	MF	1987–1991	185	12	197	26
Brian Flynn	Wales	MF	1988–1992	121	10	131	6
Nigel Beaumont	England	DF	1988–1991	150	5	155	4
Andy Thackeray	England	DF	1988–1992	183	17	200	18
Vince O'Keefe	England	GK	1989–1992	108	0	108	0
Chris Armstrong	England	FW	1989–1991; 2003–2005	94	54	148	35
Gareth Owen	Wales	MF	1989–2001	408	68	476	45
Waynne Phillips	Wales	MF	1990–1998; 1999–2002	286	35	321	23
Mark Sertori	England	DF/FW	1990–1994	140	7	147	2
Phil Hardy	Republic of Ireland	DF	1990–2001	481	4	485	1
Steve Watkin	Wales	FW	1990–1997	221	45	266	80
Lee Jones	Wales	FW	1990–1992; 1996; 1997; 2002–2004	87	53	140	43
Brian Carey	Republic of Ireland	DF	1991–1992; 1996–2004; 2006	381	10	391	20
Karl Connolly	England	FW/MF	1991–2000	451	25	476	122
Jonathan Cross	England	DF	1991–1997	115	37	152	17
Mel Pejic	England	DF	1992–1995	127	3	130	5
Tony Humes	England	DF	1992–1999	247	8	255	10
Barry Jones	England	DF	1992–1997	237	15	252	7
Gary Bennett	England	FW	1992–1995; 1997	174	2	176	114
Dave Brammer	England	MF	1992–1999	158	25	183	16
Barry Hunter	Northern Ireland	DF	1993–1996	118	4	122	7
Andy Marriott	Wales	GK	1993–1998	269	0	269	0
Bryan Hughes	England	MF	1994–1997	100	27	127	21
Deryn Brace	Wales	DF	1994–2000	107	11	118	2
Mark McGregor	England	DF	1995–2001	309	9	318	14
Craig Skinner	England	MF	1995–1998	87	25	112	11
Peter Ward	England	MF	1995–1999	157	4	161	18
Martyn Chalk	England	MF	1996–2002	181	61	242	15
David Ridler	England	DF	1997–2001	151	19	170	2
Dean Spink	England	FW/DF	1997–2000	105	20	125	12
Steve Thomas	Wales	MF	1997–2004	105	41	146	15
Neil Roberts	Wales	FW	1997–2000; 2006–2008	138	28	166	40
Stephen Roberts	Wales	DF	1998–2005	178	9	187	9
Robin Gibson	England	MF	1999–2002	65	39	104	9
Andy Morrell	England	FW	1999–2003; 2010–2013	189	80	269	96
Paul Barrett	England	MF	1999–2004	121	29	150	9
Kevin Dearden	England	GK	1999–2001	100	0	100	0
Craig Faulconbridge	England	FW	1999–2002	116	25	141	44
Danny Williams	Wales	MF	1999–2001; 2004–2008	192	6	198	13
Darren Ferguson	Scotland	MF	1999–2007	349	7	356	34
Lee Roche	England	DF	2000–2001; 2005–2007	101	3	104	0
Hector Sam	Trinidad and Tobago	FW	2000–2005	102	87	189	47
Carlos Edwards	Trinidad and Tobago	MF/DF	2000–2005	169	28	197	28
Lee Trundle	England	FW	2001–2003	85	26	111	34
Dennis Lawrence	Trinidad and Tobago	DF	2001–2006	219	10	229	19
Shaun Pejic	Wales	DF	2001–2008	191	18	209	2
Jim Whitley	Northern Ireland	MF	2001–2006	155	7	162	2
Mark Jones	Wales	MF	2002–2008; 2009–2010	156	40	196	34
Matt Crowell	Wales	MF	2003–2007	87	27	114	5
Chris Llewellyn	Wales	MF/FW	2003–2005; 2006–2008	195	4	199	37
Simon Spender	Wales	DF	2004–2009	105	23	128	6
Mike Williams	Wales	DF	2005–2010	112	27	139	6
Marc Williams	Wales	FW	2006–2011	65	35	100	21
Chris Maxwell	Wales	GK	2009–2012; 2013	108	0	108	0
Adrian Cieślewicz	Poland	MF/FW	2009–2014	64	109	173	21
Curtis Obeng	England	DF	2009–2012	102	8	110	2
Johnny Hunt	England	DF	2010–2015	104	31	135	16
Neil Ashton	England	DF	2010–2015	243	1	244	16
Jay Harris	England	MF	2010–2015; 2020–2021	239	17	256	20
Dean Keates	England	MF	2010–2015	168	16	184	15
Joe Clarke	England	MF	2011–2015	157	24	181	19
Rob Evans	Wales	MF	2011–2017	97	39	136	7
Mark Carrington	England	MF	2013–2021	245	29	274	6
Connor Jennings	England	FW	2014–2016	95	7	102	23
Manny Smith	England	DF	2014–2016; 2017–2018	161	0	161	7
Paul Rutherford	England	MF	2016–2021	154	45	199	8
James Jennings	England	DF	2017–2020	130	4	134	10
Shaun Pearson	England	DF	2017–2021	140	1	141	12
Akil Wright	England	DF	2017–2020	78	24	102	8
Rob Lainton	England	GK	2018–2023	143	0	143	0
Luke Young	England	MF	2018–2024	223	36	259	22
**Max Cleworth**	England	DF	2019–	185	14	199	13
Jordan Davies	Wales	MF	2020–2025	102	47	149	37
Paul Mullin	England	FW	2021–2026	145	27	172	110
James Jones	Scotland	MF	2021–2025	108	30	138	16
Ben Tozer	England	DF	2021–2024	137	4	141	7
Ollie Palmer	England	FW	2022–2025	118	38	156	46
Thomas O'Connor	Republic of Ireland	DF/MF	2022–2026	89	26	115	8
Elliot Lee	England	MF	2022–2026	117	35	152	41
**Ryan Barnett**	England	MF	2023–	79	33	112	4
James McClean	Republic of Ireland	MF/DF	2023–2026	93	15	108	8
**Arthur Okonkwo**	Nigeria	GK	2023–	120	1	121	0
**George Dobson**	England	MF	2024–	80	23	103	4
