= 1999–2000 Wrexham F.C. season =

Welsh football club season

Wrexham
1999–2000 season
- Chairman: Pryce Griffiths
- Manager: Brian Flynn
- Stadium: Racecourse Ground
- Second Division: 11th
- FA Cup: Fourth round
- League Cup: First round
- Football League Trophy: First round
- Top goalscorer: League: Connolly/Faulconbridge (9); All: Faulconbridge (11)
- Average home league attendance: 3,952
Home colours

During the 1999–2000 English football season, Wrexham F.C. competed in the Football League Second Division.

== Season summary ==
In the 1999-2000 season, Wrexham had a satisfying league campaign finishing mid-table in 11th place. The season also saw Wrexham again beat a top-flight team in the FA Cup, this time in the shape of Middlesbrough. The final score of the match was 2–1, with the second half goals coming from Robin Gibson and Darren Ferguson after being behind to the Premiership outfit.

== Final league table ==
Pos	Team	Pld	W	D	L	GF	GA	GD	Pts
9	Bristol City	46	15	19	12	59	57	+2	64
10	Reading	46	16	14	16	57	63	−6	62
11	Wrexham	46	17	11	18	52	61	−9	62
12	Wycombe Wanderers	46	16	13	17	56	53	+3	61
13	Luton Town	46	17	10	19	61	65	−4	61

Rules for classification: 1) Points; 2) Goal difference; 3) Goals scored

== Results ==
Wrexham's score comes first

=== Legend ===
Win	Draw	Loss

=== Football League Second Division ===
Date	Opponent	Venue	Result	Attendance	Scorers
7 August 1999	Blackpool	A	1–2	5,008	Faulconbridge
14 August 1999	Bury	H	1–0	4,185	Stevens
20 August 1999	Cardiff City	A	1–1	11,168	Stevens
28 August 1999	Bristol Rovers	H	2–1	3,365	Faulconbridge (2)
31 August 1999	Wycombe Wanderers	A	1–0	5,393	Barrett
3 September 1999	Notts County	H	2–3	5,040	Faulconbridge (2)
11 September 1999	Luton Town	A	1–3	5,121	Stevens
18 September 1999	Oxford United	H	1–0	4,229	Stevens
25 September 1999	Stoke City	H	2–3	5,924	Carey, Lowe
1 October 1999	Colchester United	A	2–2	3,315	Owen, Morrell
9 October 1999	Gillingham	A	1–5	5,997	Faulconbridge
16 October 1999	Chesterfield	H	1–1	2,603	Roberts
19 October 1999	Wigan Athletic	H	1–1	3,392	Roberts (pen)
23 October 1999	Stoke City	A	0–2	10,545	
2 November 1999	Burnley	A	0–5	8,944	
6 November 1999	Brentford	H	0–1	2,473	
12 November 1999	Millwall	A	0–0	6,711	
23 November 1999	Cambridge United	H	1–1	3,467	Faulconbridge
27 November 1999	Oldham Athletic	A	0–0	4,963	
4 December 1999	Blackpool	H	1–1	2,668	Faulconbridge
18 December 1999	Reading	A	2–2	6,223	Owen, Roberts
26 December 1999	Preston North End	H	0–0	7,872	
28 December 1999	Bournemouth	A	0–1	5,394	
3 January 2000	Bristol City	H	0–1	4,021	
15 January 2000	Bury	A	2–0	3,622	Roberts (2)
22 January 2000	Cardiff City	H	2–1	4,350	Connolly, Ferguson
29 January 2000	Bristol Rovers	A	1–3	8,196	Roberts
1 February 2000	Scunthorpe United	A	2–0	2,851	Barrett, Connolly
5 February 2000	Wycombe Wanderers	H	1–3	2,781	Faulconbridge
12 February 2000	Notts County	A	1–2	5,474	Connolly
19 February 2000	Oldham Athletic	H	0–3	3,603	
26 February 2000	Oxford United	A	4–1	4,988	Connolly, Allsopp (2), Ferguson
4 March 2000	Luton Town	H	1–0	2,703	Allsopp
7 March 2000	Brentford	A	2–0	4,055	Allsopp, Connolly
11 March 2000	Burnley	H	0–1	6,582	
18 March 2000	Cambridge United	A	4–3	4,591	Williams, Russell (2), Ferguson
21 March 2000	Millwall	H	1–1	3,019	Owen
25 March 2000	Preston North End	A	0–1	12,481	
28 March 2000	Scunthorpe United	H	3–1	2,139	Gibson, Russell, Ferguson (pen)
1 April 2000	Reading	H	0–1	2,613	
8 April 2000	Bristol City	A	0–4	8,639	
15 April 2000	Bournemouth	H	1–0	2,597	Russell
22 April 2000	Chesterfield	A	3–0	2,550	Connolly (3, 1 pen)
24 April 2000	Colchester United	H	1–0	2,460	Hardy (pen)
29 April 2000	Wigan Athletic	A	1–0	7,245	Connolly
6 May 2000	Gillingham	H	1–0	5,297	McGregor

=== FA Cup ===
Round	Date	Opponent	Venue	Result	Attendance	Goalscorers
R1	30 October 1999	Kettering Town	H	1–1	2,701	Roberts
R1R	10 November 1999	Kettering Town	A	2–0	2,611	Roberts, Williams
R2	20 November 1999	Rochdale	H	2–1	3,408	Roberts, Faulconbridge
R3	11 December 1999	Middlesbrough	H	2–1	11,755	Gibson, Ferguson
R4	8 January 2000	Cambridge United	H	1–2	7,186	Connolly

=== League Cup ===
Round	Date	Opponent	Venue	Result	Attendance	Goalscorers
R1 1st Leg	10 August 1999	Preston North End	A	0–1	4,930	
R1 2nd Leg	24 August 1999	Preston North End	H	0–2 (lost 0-3 agg)	2,911	

=== Football League Trophy ===
Round	Date	Opponent	Venue	Result	Attendance	Goalscorers
NR1	7 December 1999	Preston North End	A	1–4	3,306	Faulconbridge

== Squad ==
Note: Flags indicate national team as defined under FIFA eligibility rules; some limited exceptions apply. Players may hold more than one non-FIFA nationality.

No.	Pos.	Nation	Player
1	GK	ENG	Kevin Dearden
2	DF	ENG	Mark McGregor
3	DF	IRL	Phil Hardy
4	MF	WAL	Gareth Owen
5	DF	IRL	Brian Carey
6	DF	ENG	Adrian Moody
7	MF	ENG	Martyn Chalk
8	MF	ENG	Kevin Russell
9	FW	ENG	Karl Connolly
10	FW	ENG	Dean Spink
11	FW	ENG	David Lowe
12	DF	ENG	David Ridler
13	MF	IRL	Dave Warren
14	DF	WAL	Deryn Brace
15	MF	ENG	Paul Barrett

No.	Pos.	Nation	Player
17	DF	WAL	Stephen Roberts
18	MF	WAL	Danny Williams
19	MF	WAL	Steve Thomas
20	GK	ENG	Mark Cartwright
21	GK	WAL	David Walsh
22	GK	ENG	Kristian Rogers
23	DF	WAL	Steve Cooper
24	DF	ENG	Mike Ryan
25	FW	ENG	Robin Gibson
26	DF	ENG	Kevin Hannon
28	FW	ENG	Andy Morrell
29	FW	ENG	Ian Stevens
30	MF	WAL	Wayne Phillips
31	FW	ENG	Craig Faulconbridge
32	MF	SCO	Darren Ferguson

=== Left club during season ===
Note: Flags indicate national team as defined under FIFA eligibility rules; some limited exceptions apply. Players may hold more than one non-FIFA nationality.

No.	Pos.	Nation	Player
27	GK	ENG	Jake Edwards (to Telford United)
16	DF	WAL	Neil Roberts (to Wigan Athletic)

No.	Pos.	Nation	Player
33	FW	AUS	Danny Allsopp (on loan from Manchester City)
6	DF	ENG	Jason Jarrett (Released)
