= 1996–97 Wrexham F.C. season =

Welsh football club season

Wrexham
1996–97 season
- Chairman: Pryce Griffiths
- Manager: Brian Flynn
- Stadium: Racecourse Ground
- Second Division: 8th
- FA Cup: Quarter finals
- League Cup: First round
- Football League Trophy: Second round
- Top goalscorer: League: Connolly (14); All: Connolly (15)
- Average home league attendance: 4,112
Home colours

During the 1996–97 English football season, Wrexham F.C. competed in the Football League Second Division.

== Season summary ==
In the 1996–97 season, Wrexham set off on another amazing run in the FA Cup and beating more top flight opposition. Following wins at Colwyn Bay and Scunthorpe United, they were drawn to play West Ham United at home, the game ending in a 1–1 draw on a snow-covered pitch after a well earned draw. The replay at Upton Park ended in a shock 1–0 win to Wrexham as Kevin Russell scored in the dying minutes to send Wrexham into the fourth round. After also beating Peterborough United and Birmingham City in the following rounds, they played Chesterfield in an all-Division-2 FA Cup quarter final, Wrexham narrowly losing to the Spireites 1–0.

The league campaign began very brightly for Wrexham as they lost only one from their first 17 league matches and were in the play-off places heading to Christmas but then a little decline in form with only seven wins in the second half of the campaign wasn't enough for a play-off position and finished 4 points off the top six.

== Final league table ==
Pos	Team	Pld	W	D	L	GF	GA	GD	Pts	Promotion or relegation
6	Crewe Alexandra (O, P)	46	22	7	17	56	47	+9	73	Qualification for the Second Division play-offs
7	Blackpool	46	18	15	13	60	47	+13	69	
8	Wrexham	46	17	18	11	55	50	+5	69	
9	Burnley	46	19	11	16	71	55	+16	68	
10	Chesterfield	46	18	14	14	42	39	+3	68	

Rules for classification: In the Football League goals scored (GF) takes precedence over goal difference (GD).
(O) Play-off winners; (P) Promoted

== Results ==
Wrexham's score comes first

=== Legend ===
Win	Draw	Loss

=== Football League Second Division ===
Date	Opponent	Venue	Result	Attendance	Scorers
17 August 1996	Millwall	A	1–1	9,371	Watkin
24 August 1996	Plymouth Argyle	H	4–4	3,920	Phillips (2), Connolly (2)
7 September 1996	Peterborough United	H	1–1	3,222	Connolly
10 September 1996	Stockport County	A	2–0	4,244	Watkin, Skinner
14 September 1996	Crewe Alexandra	A	1–3	4,469	Ward
17 September 1996	Bristol Rovers	H	1–0	2,401	Cross
21 September 1996	Preston North End	H	1–0	5,299	Phillips
24 September 1996	Walsall	A	1–0	2,832	Cross
28 September 1996	Notts County	A	0–0	4,216	
8 October 1996	Shrewsbury Town	H	2–1	5,031	Watkin, Brace
12 October 1996	Watford	A	1–1	8,441	Humes
15 October 1996	Blackpool	A	3–3	4,014	Brammer, Phillips, Chalk (pen)
19 October 1996	Bournemouth	H	2–0	3,945	Skinner, Connolly
26 October 1996	Wycombe Wanderers	A	0–0	5,548	
29 October 1996	Bury	H	1–1	3,895	Hughes
2 November 1996	Chesterfield	H	3–2	4,160	Connolly, Morris, Owen
9 November 1996	Gillingham	A	2–1	5,094	Morris, Connolly
23 November 1996	Brentford	A	0–2	4,885	
30 November 1996	Wycombe Wanderers	H	1–0	3,280	Skinner
3 December 1996	Burnley	A	0–2	8,587	
14 December 1996	York City	A	0–1	2,600	
21 December 1996	Bristol City	H	2–1	4,488	Watkin (pen), Hughes
26 December 1996	Stockport County	H	2–3	6,736	Watkin, Morris
11 January 1997	Notts County	H	3–3	3,267	Connolly (2), Watkin
18 January 1997	Luton Town	A	0–0	5,734	
1 February 1997	Gillingham	H	1–1	3,193	Connolly
8 February 1997	Chesterfield	A	0–0	6,738	
11 February 1997	Peterborough United	A	1–0	2,975	Hughes
22 February 1997	Rotherham United	A	0–0	2,539	
25 February 1997	Bury	A	0–0	3,419	
1 March 1997	Burnley	H	0–0	6,947	
12 March 1997	Luton Town	H	2–1	3,342	Bennett (2, 1 pen)
15 March 1997	York City	H	0–0	3,874	
18 March 1997	Preston North End	A	1–2	8,271	Bennett
22 March 1997	Plymouth Argyle	A	1–0	5,468	Humes
25 March 1997	Brentford	H	0–2	4,053	
28 March 1997	Millwall	H	3–3	4,684	Humes, Phillips, Bennett
31 March 1997	Bristol Rovers	A	0–2	6,225	
5 April 1997	Walsall	H	1–2	3,266	Connolly (pen)
8 April 1997	Rotherham United	H	1–0	2,002	Connolly
12 April 1997	Shrewsbury Town	A	1–0	4,553	Bennett
15 April 1997	Bristol City	A	1–2	9,817	Morris
19 April 1997	Watford	H	3–1	6,654	Connolly (2, 1 pen), Skinner
22 April 1997	Crewe Alexandra	H	1–1	4,643	McGregor
26 April 1997	Bournemouth	A	1–2	4,805	Connolly
3 May 1997	Blackpool	H	2–1	5,664	Watkin, Humes

=== FA Cup ===
Round	Date	Opponent	Venue	Result	Attendance	Goalscorers
R1	16 November 1996	Colwyn Bay	A	1–1	4,679	Hughes
R1R	26 November 1996	Colwyn Bay	H	2–0	4,106	Hughes (2)
R2	7 December 1996	Scunthorpe United	H	2–2	3,780	Morris, Watkin
R2R	17 December 1996	Scunthorpe United	A	3–2 (a.e.t.)	3,976	Hughes, Morris, Watkin (pen)
R3	4 January 1997	West Ham United	H	1–1	9,747	Hughes
R3R	25 January 1997	West Ham United	A	1–0	16,763	Russell
R4	4 February 1997	Peterborough United	A	4–2	8,734	Ward, Watkin, Russell (2)
R5	15 February 1997	Birmingham City	A	3–1	21,511	Hughes, Humes, Connolly
QF	9 March 1997	Chesterfield	A	0–1	8,735	

=== League Cup ===
Round	Date	Opponent	Venue	Result	Attendance	Goalscorers
R1 1st Leg	20 August 1996	Huddersfield Town	A	0–3	5,178	
R1 2nd Leg	3 September 1996	Huddersfield Town	H	1–2 (lost 1–5 on agg)	1,776	Skinner

=== Football League Trophy ===
Round	Date	Opponent	Venue	Result	Attendance	Goalscorers
NR2	28 January 1997	Crewe Alexandra	H	0–1	2,216	

== Squad ==
Note: Flags indicate national team as defined under FIFA eligibility rules; some limited exceptions apply. Players may hold more than one non-FIFA nationality.

No.	Pos.	Nation	Player
—	GK	(England) ENG	Mark Cartwright
—	GK	(Wales) WAL	Andy Marriott
—	DF	(Wales) WAL	Deryn Brace
—	DF	(Republic of Ireland) IRL	Brian Carey
—	DF	(England) ENG	Jonathan Cross
—	DF	(Republic of Ireland) IRL	Phil Hardy
—	DF	(England) ENG	Tony Humes
—	DF	(England) ENG	Barry Jones
—	DF	(England) ENG	Paul Jones
—	DF	(England) ENG	Mark McGregor
—	DF	(England) ENG	David Ridler
—	DF	(England) ENG	Jason Soloman
—	DF	(England) ENG	Andy Thomas
—	DF	(Wales) WAL	Scott Williams
—	MF	(England) ENG	Dave Brammer

No.	Pos.	Nation	Player
—	MF	(England) ENG	Martyn Chalk
—	MF	(England) ENG	Bryan Hughes
—	MF	(Wales) WAL	Gareth Owen
—	MF	(Wales) WAL	Wayne Phillips
—	MF	(England) ENG	Craig Skinner
—	MF	(England) ENG	Neil Wainwright
—	MF	(England) ENG	Peter Ward
—	FW	(England) ENG	Gary Bennett
—	FW	(England) ENG	Karl Connolly
—	FW	(Wales) WAL	Lee Jones
—	FW	(England) ENG	Steve Morris
—	FW	(Wales) WAL	Paul Roberts
—	FW	(England) ENG	Kevin Russell
—	FW	(Wales) WAL	Steve Watkin
