= 1997–98 FAW Premier Cup =

Invitation Cup

Tournament details
- Country: England; Wales
- Teams: 8

Final positions
- Champions: Wrexham
- Runners-up: Cardiff City

Tournament statistics
- Matches played: 33
- Goals scored: 93 (2.82 per match)

The 1997–98 FAW Premier Cup was the inaugural season of the tournament.

== Group stage ==
=== Group A ===
Team	Pld	W	D	L	GF	GA	GD	Pts	BAR	BAN	SWA	CON
(Wales) Barry Town	6	5	0	1	23	5	+18	15	—	0–3	2–3	9–0
(Wales) Bangor City	6	3	1	2	8	5	+3	10	1–2	—	1–0	4–0
(England) Swansea City	6	2	2	2	7	6	+1	8	1–2	1–1	—	0–0
(Wales) Conwy United	6	0	1	5	0	22	−22	1	0–6	0–1	0–2	—

=== Group B ===
Team	Pld	W	D	L	GF	GA	GD	Pts	CAR	WRE	NEW	MER
(England) Cardiff City	6	3	3	0	7	4	+3	12	—	1–1	3–2	1–0
(England) Wrexham	6	3	2	1	11	5	+6	11	0–1	—	1–0	5–1
(Wales) Newtown	6	1	3	2	2	9	−7	6	1–1	2–2	—	2–2
(England) Merthyr Tydfil	6	0	2	4	4	12	−8	2	0–0	0–2	1–2	—

== Quarter finals ==
Bangor City	3 – 5	Newtown
Ken McKenna; Chris Taylor	Report	Scott Ruscoe; Jason Yates; Kevin Morrison; John Leah

Farrar Road Stadium, Bangor

Barry Town	0 – 1^{(a.e.t.)}	Merthyr Tydfil
	Report	Chris Summers

Jenner Park, Barry

Cardiff City	4 – 0	Conwy United
Jeff Eckhardt; Christian Roberts; Scott Fowler	Report

Ninian Park, Cardiff

Wrexham	2 – 2 (a.e.t.)	Swansea City
Dave Brammer; Mark Wilson	Report	Kristian O'Leary; Julian Alsop
Penalties
Penalty scored	5 – 4	Penalty scored Penalty missed

Racecourse Ground, Wrexham

== Semi finals ==
=== First leg ===
Merthyr Tydfil	0 – 4	Cardiff City
	Report	Craig Middleton; Tony Carss; Andy Saville; Carl Dale

Penydarren Park

Wrexham	2 – 0	Newtown
Dean Spink; Neil Roberts	Report

Racecourse Ground

=== Second leg ===
Cardiff City	3 – 1	Merthyr Tydfil
Christian Roberts own goal Robert Earnshaw	Report	Ian Mitchell

Ninian Park

Newtown	0 – 2	Wrexham
	Report	Dean Spink; Mark Wilson

Latham Park

== Final ==
Wrexham	2 – 1	Cardiff City
Mark Wilson; Gareth Owen	Report	Tony Carss

== See also ==
- 1997–98 in Welsh football
