= 1991 Welsh Cup final =

1991 Football Association of Wales Challenge Cup final
- Event: 1990–91 Welsh Cup
Swansea City	Wrexham
2	0
- Date: 19 May 1991
- Venue: National Stadium, Cardiff
- Referee: K Burge (Rhondda)
- Attendance: 5,000

The 1991 Welsh Cup final saw Swansea City win the Welsh Cup for the tenth time, by beating Wrexham 2–0 at National Stadium in the 104th Welsh Cup Final.

This was Wrexham's second consecutive final, having lost 2–1 to English side Hereford United the previous season.

The win gave Swansea their second campaign in a European competition, in the 1991–92 European Cup Winners' Cup, in three years after their Welsh Cup triumph in 1989. This campaign was also Swansea's last foray into Europe until 2013. This triumph was Swansea's last in the Welsh Cup.

== Route to the final ==
=== Wrexham ===
Round	Opposition	Score	Venue
Third Round	Worcester City	3–1	Racecourse Ground (h)
Fourth Round	Ammanford Town	0–5	Rice Street (a)
Quarter-final	Stroud	1–2	The Lawn Ground (a)
Semi-final; 1st leg	Hereford United	1–1	Racecourse Ground (h)
Semi-final; 2nd leg	Hereford United	1–2	Edgar Street (a)

=== Swansea City ===
Round	Opposition	Score	Venue
Third Round	Llanelli	8–1	Vetch Field (h)
Fourth Round	Merthyr Tydfil	0–1	Penydarren Park (a)
Quarter-final	Colwyn Bay	1–1	Llanelian Road (a)
Replay	Colwyn Bay	2–1	Vetch Field (h)
Semi-final; 1st leg	Barry Town	2–2	Jenner Park (a)
Semi-final; 2nd leg	Barry Town	2–1	Vetch Field (h)

== Match ==
19 May 1991

Swansea City	2–0	Wrexham
Penney; Raynor	Report

National Stadium, Cardiff
Attendance: 5,000
Referee: K Burge (Rhondda)

Swansea City	Wrexham

SWANSEA CITY:
GK	1	(Wales) Mark Kendall
DF	2	(England) Paul Williams
DF	3	(Wales) Chris Coleman
DF	4	(Wales) David Hough
DF	5	(Wales) Des Trick
MF	6	(Wales) Andy Legg
MF	7	(England) Andy Watson (substituted off)
MF	8	(England) Paul Raynor
FW	9	(Wales) Russell Coughlin
FW	10	(England) Terry Connor
DF	11	(England) Dave Penney
Substitute:
CF	12	(Scotland) Paul Chalmers (substituted on)
Manager:
(Scotland) Frank Burrows

WREXHAM:
GK	1	(England) Mark Morris
DF	2	(England) Andy Thackeray (substituted off)
DF	3	(Republic of Ireland) Phil Hardy
MF	4	(England) Mark Sertori
MF	5	(Wales) Wayne Phillips
MF	6	(Wales) Joey Jones
MF	7	(England) Jon Bowden
MF	8	(England) Joey Murray (substituted off)
FW	9	(Wales) Lee Jones
FW	10	(England) Andy Preece
FW	11	(England) Ian Griffiths
Substitutes:
MF	12	(Wales) Gareth Owen (substituted on)
DF	12	(England) Nigel Beaumont (substituted on)
Manager:
(Wales) Brian Flynn

MATCH RULES

- 90 minutes.
- 30 minutes of extra-time if necessary.
- Replay if scores still level.
