= Ian Griffiths =

Ian Griffiths may refer to:

- Ian Griffiths (footballer) (born 1960), English footballer
- Ian Griffiths (businessman) (born 1966), British businessman

== See also ==
- Iwan Griffiths (born 1985), drummer for Welsh rock band The Automatic
- Ian Griffith (1925–1992), Australian politician
