= Bulling =

Bulling may refer to:

- Bulling (cattle), a behaviour seen in cattle
- Bull polishing, a method for polishing leather products
- Bullying

== People called Bulling ==
- Anneliese Bulling (1900–2004), German–American art historian
- Bud Bulling (1952–2014), American Baseball player
- Ed Bulling (1889–1963), English professional footballer
- Jim Bulling – English footballer born in 1909
- Pieter Bulling (born 1993), a New Zealand racing cyclist

== See also ==
- Bulla Bulling – Place in the Goldfields-Esperance region of Western Australia
- Eva Bulling-Schröter – German politician (born 1956)
