= 1995 Welsh Cup final =

1995 Football Association of Wales Challenge Cup final
- Event: 1994–95 Welsh Cup
Wrexham	Cardiff City
2	1
- Date: 21 May 1995
- Venue: Cardiff Arms Park, Cardiff
- Referee: V.J. Reed (Aberdare)
- Attendance: 11,200

The 1995 Welsh Cup final, was the 108th in the competition. It was contested by Wrexham and Cardiff City at the Cardiff Arms Park, Cardiff.

== Route to the Final ==
=== Wrexham ===
Round	Opposition	Score	Location
3rd	Newtown	1–1	Latham Park, Newtown
3rd	Newtown	2–0	The Racecourse, Wrexham
4th	Connahs Quay Nomads	4–0	The Racecourse, Wrexham
5th	Bangor City	2–2	Farrar Road, Bangor
5th	Bangor City	1–0	The Racecourse, Wrexham
SF	Merthyr Tydfil	3–1	The Racecourse, Wrexham
SF	Merthyr Tydfil	1–0	Penydarren Park, Merthyr

=== Cardiff City ===
Round	Opposition	Score	Location
3rd	Ebbw Vale	1–1	Eugene Cross, Ebbw Vale
3rd	Ebbw Vale	7–1	Ninian Park, Cardiff
4th	Risca United	4–0	Ninian Park, Cardiff
5th	Llandudno	1–0	Maesdu Park, Llandudno
SF	Swansea City	1–0	The Vetch, Swansea
SF	Swansea City	0–0	Ninian Park, Cardiff

== Final ==
21 May 1995
15:00

Wrexham	2 – 1	Cardiff City
Gary Bennett 19' (pen.); Gary Bennett 26'		Carl Dale 78'

Cardiff Arms Park, Cardiff
Attendance: 11,200
Referee: V.J. Reed (Aberdare)

Wrexham	Cardiff City

GK	1	(Wales) Andy Marriott
RB		(Wales) Deryn Brace
CB		(England) Barry Jones
CB		(Northern Ireland) Barry Hunter
LB	3	(Republic of Ireland) Phil Hardy (c)
RM		(Republic of Ireland) Kieron Durkin
CM		(Wales) Gareth Owen
CM		(England) Bryan Hughes
LM	9	(England) Karl Connolly
CF	10	(England) Stephen Morris	(substituted off) 84'
CF	7	(England) Gary Bennett
Substitutes:
GK	13	(England) Mark Cartwright
CM	12	(Wales) Wayne Phillips
CF	14	(Wales) Steve Watkin	(substituted in) 84'
Manager:
(Wales) Brian Flynn

GK	1	(Wales) Scott Williams
RB		(Republic of Ireland) Derek Brazil
CB		(Wales) Jason Perry
CB		(Wales) Lee Baddeley
LB		(Wales) Damon Searle
RM		(Guyana) Cohen Griffith
CM		(Wales) Nathan Wigg
CM		(England) Nick Richardson
LM		(Northern Ireland) Paul Millar	(substituted off) 84'
CF		(Wales) Carl Dale
CF		(Wales) Tony Bird	(substituted off) 77'
Substitutes:
GK		(Wales) Pat Mountain
CM		(England) Charlie Oatway	(substituted in) 84'
CF		(Wales) Scott Young	(substituted in) 77'
Manager:
(England) Eddie May

Assistant referees:
