= 1923 in association football =

The following are the football (soccer) events of the year 1923 throughout the world.

== Events ==
- March 16 – Finnish association football club, Kuopion Palloseura is founded.
- April 18 – Russian professional sports club, Dynamo Moscow, is founded.
- April 28 – The first FA Cup Final to be held at Wembley Stadium, between Bolton Wanderers F.C. and West Ham United F.C. Known as the White Horse Final due to the memorable image of a policeman on a white horse marshalling the crowds. With an official maximum capacity of 127,000, the attendance was quoted as 126,947 but up to 240,000 people are thought to have squeezed in through the 104 turnstiles by the time the gates were closed, leaving tens of thousands still queuing outside. The White Horse Final has the highest ever unofficial "non-racing" sports attendance in the world, which is very unlikely to be broken in the near future. This claim, however, is disputed, as the Maracana held 199,854 fans during the 1950 World Cup final between Brazil and Uruguay.
- June 25 – Association football club FC Rapid București is formed, on the initiative of the Grivița railroad workers (first named CFR București).
- August 21 – Mexican Association football Club Necaxa is founded by engineer William H. Frasser.
- November 23 – AFC Persis Solo is founded as Vorstenlandsche Voetbal Bond in the Dutch East Indies (modern-day Indonesia).

== Winners club national championship ==
- Belgium: Union Saint-Gilloise
- Denmark: BK Frem
- England: Liverpool F.C.
- Germany: Hamburger SV
- Greece: Peiraikos Syndesmos
- Hungary: MTK Hungária
- Iceland: Fram
- Italy: Genoa 1893
- Kingdom of Serbs, Croats and Slovenes: Građanski Zagreb
- Paraguay: Club Guaraní
- Poland: Pogoń Lwów
- Scotland: For fuller coverage, see 1922-23 in Scottish football.
  - Scottish Division One – Rangers
  - Scottish Division Two – Queens Park
  - Scottish Cup – Celtic

== International tournaments ==
- 1923 British Home Championship (October 21, 1922 – April 14, 1923)

Scotland

- South American Championship 1923 in Uruguay (October 29, 1923 – December 2, 1923)

Uruguay

== Births ==
- May 1 – Fernando Cabrita, Portuguese international footballer and manager (died 2014)
- May 6 – Josep Seguer, Spanish international footballer and manager (died 2014)
- June 30 – Bill Ellerington, English international footballer (died 2015)
- September 20 – Stefan Bozhkov, Bulgarian international footballer (died 2014)
- October 3 – Les Speed, Welsh professional footballer (died 2012)
- October 13 – Faas Wilkes, Dutch international footballer (died 2006)
- December 1 – Ferenc Szusza, Hungarian international footballer (died 2006)
- December 3 – Stjepan Bobek, Yugoslav international footballer (died 2010)
- December 5 – Johnny Mortimer, English professional footballer (died 2013)
- December 25 – Luis Alamos, Chilean football manager (died 1983)
