= Matt Lawrence =

Matt or Matthew Lawrence may refer to:

- Matt Lawrence (American football) (born 1985), American football running back
- Matt Lawrence (producer), British engineer, record producer and mixer
- Matthew Lawrence (born 1980), American actor and singer
- Matt Lawrence (English footballer) (born 1974), English footballer
- Matt Lawrence (Welsh footballer) (1909–1999), Welsh footballer

== See also ==
- Matthew Laurance (born 1950), American film and television actor and comedian
