= 2008–09 Welsh Premier League =

Welsh Premier League
- Season: 2008–09
- Champions: Rhyl
- Relegated: Caernarfon Town
- Champions League: Rhyl
- Europa League: Llanelli; The New Saints; Bangor City (via cup)
- Matches: 306
- Goals: 998 (3.26 per match)
- Top goalscorer: Rhys Griffiths (31)
- Biggest home win: The New Saints 8–0 Caernarfon Town
- Biggest away win: Porthmadog 0–6 Bangor City
- Highest scoring: Porthmadog 6–5 Gap Connah's Quay

The 2008–09 Welsh Premier League was the 17th season of the Welsh Premier League since its establishment in 1992 as the League of Wales. It began on 15 August 2008 and ended on 25 April 2009. Llanelli were the defending champions.

== Team changes from 2007–08 ==
Prestatyn Town were promoted from the Cymru Alliance and played in the top division for the first time in their history. Caersws survived relegation after none of the top two teams in the divisions below could meet ground regulations.

== Overview ==
Location of clubs in Welsh Premier League 2008–09

Team	Ground	Capacity
Aberystwyth Town	Park Avenue	5,500
Airbus UK Broughton	The Airfield	2,100
Bangor City	Farrar Road Stadium	1,500
Caernarfon Town	The Oval	3,000
Caersws F.C.	Recreation Ground	3,500
Carmarthen Town A.F.C.	Richmond Park	3,000
Gap Connah's Quay F.C.	Deeside Stadium	5,500
Haverfordwest County A.F.C.	Bridge Meadow Stadium	2,000
Llanelli A.F.C.	Stebonheath Park	3,700
Neath Athletic A.F.C.	The Gnoll	7,000
NEWI Cefn Druids A.F.C.	Plaskynaston Lane	2,000
Newtown A.F.C.	Latham Park	5,000
Port Talbot Town F.C.	Victoria Road	2,500
Porthmadog F.C.	Y Traeth	2,000
Prestatyn Town F.C.	Bastion Road	1,000
Rhyl F.C.	Belle Vue	3,800
The New Saints F.C.	Park Hall	2,000
Welshpool Town F.C.	Maes y Dre Recreation Ground	3,000

== League table ==
Pos	Team	Pld	W	D	L	GF	GA	GD	Pts	Qualification or relegation
1	Rhyl (C)	34	29	3	2	95	29	+66	90	Qualification for Champions League second qualifying round
2	Llanelli	34	26	5	3	98	38	+60	83	Qualification for Europa League first qualifying round
3	The New Saints	34	20	11	3	79	27	+52	71	Qualification for Europa League first qualifying round
4	Carmarthen Town	34	19	5	10	52	47	+5	62	
5	Port Talbot Town	34	16	8	10	57	48	+9	56	
6	Bangor City	34	16	7	11	58	40	+18	55	Qualification for Europa League second qualifying round (Note: Bangor City won the 2008–09 Welsh Cup and thereby qualified for the second qualifying round of the UEFA Europa League.)
7	Haverfordwest County	34	16	7	11	53	39	+14	55	
8	Aberystwyth Town	34	12	10	12	51	50	+1	46	
9	Gap Connah's Quay Nomads	34	12	5	17	49	65	−16	41	
10	Newtown	34	10	10	14	46	54	−8	40	
11	Technogroup Welshpool Town	34	11	7	16	48	70	−22	40	
12	Airbus UK Broughton	34	12	3	19	47	57	−10	39	
13	NEWI Cefn Druids	34	9	7	18	57	74	−17	34	
14	Neath Athletic	34	10	4	20	43	65	−22	34	
15	Prestatyn Town	34	8	9	17	48	70	−22	33	
16	CPD Porthmadog	34	10	2	22	57	91	−34	32	
17	Caersws FC	34	6	7	21	28	61	−33	25	
18	Caernarfon Town (R)	34	5	8	21	32	73	−41	20 (Note: Caernarfon Town were docked 3 points for fielding an ineligible player on 16 August 2008.)	Relegation to Cymru Alliance

Rules for classification: 1) points; 2) goal difference; 3) number of goals scored.
(C) Champions; (R) Relegated

== Results ==
Home \ Away	ABE	AIR	BAN	CNR	CAE	CMR	CQN	POR	HAV	LLA	NEA	CDR	NEW	PTA	PRE	RHL	TNS	WEL
Aberystwyth Town		1–0	1–2	3–1	2–2	0–3	1–1	5–2	0–3	1–1	6–2	1–1	2–0	1–1	2–1	0–1	2–2	0–2
Airbus UK Broughton	1–2		2–3	4–3	0–2	0–1	0–0	0–3	2–4	0–4	4–3	1–0	3–1	1–1	1–1	1–3	1–0	5–0
Bangor City	0–0	1–0		1–1	3–0	2–0	6–0	1–0	1–1	0–2	0–1	4–2	1–2	4–2	1–1	0–2	0–0	0–2
Caernarfon Town	1–0	0–2	0–2		2–2	1–3	0–2	0–2	0–1	0–5	1–0	4–2	0–0	2–4	1–1	0–1	0–5	2–3
Caersws FC	1–3	1–3	0–1	1–0		0–2	0–1	3–2	1–0	0–2	0–0	1–2	1–1	4–2	1–2	0–3	2–6	0–1
Carmarthen Town	2–1	1–0	3–1	2–1	1–1		2–0	1–0	3–0	1–4	5–2	1–0	0–0	1–1	1–0	1–2	2–3	0–1
Connah's Quay Nomads	1–2	2–3	1–3	1–1	1–0	1–3		3–1	2–1	3–1	5–0	2–3	3–3	0–2	3–1	2–3	0–2	1–0
CPD Porthmadog	4–1	3–4	0–6	1–3	0–1	1–3	6–5		2–1	3–3	1–4	2–3	3–1	1–2	3–2	0–3	2–2	2–1
Haverfordwest County	5–1	3–0	0–2	1–1	2–0	1–1	2–0	4–2		0–1	2–0	1–1	1–0	0–1	3–1	1–3	2–2	3–1
Llanelli	3–0	3–2	4–3	3–2	3–0	5–2	4–1	5–0	2–1		2–1	1–1	3–1	2–0	6–1	0–1	1–1	4–1
Neath Athletic	0–4	3–1	0–1	2–1	0–0	2–0	0–1	3–0	1–1	0–3		1–0	3–0	2–3	2–0	2–2	1–4	3–2
Cefn Druids	2–5	0–2	1–0	0–1	3–1	1–2	6–0	2–4	0–1	0–4	3–1		2–3	1–1	3–2	2–4	0–1	3–3
Newtown	2–1	0–1	1–3	2–2	0–0	2–3	1–2	2–0	4–2	2–6	2–0	4–0		1–0	1–1	1–2	0–0	4–1
Port Talbot Town	1–1	2–1	2–1	1–0	2–0	0–0	0–2	1–3	1–2	4–6	2–0	3–2	1–2		3–1	2–2	0–0	4–0
Prestatyn Town	1–0	2–1	2–2	5–0	3–2	1–2	1–1	5–2	0–1	0–1	1–0	3–3	1–0	0–3		1–4	1–4	2–2
Rhyl	0–0	1–0	4–1	4–0	3–1	3–0	2–0	2–0	2–0	5–1	4–2	3–4	3–0	2–3	7–2		2–1	7–1
The New Saints	1–1	1–0	2–1	6–0	4–0	8–0	2–1	6–0	0–0	0–0	2–1	4–1	1–1	2–0	2–0	0–3		3–1
Welshpool Town	0–1	2–1	1–1	1–1	1–0	2–0	3–1	3–2	1–3	1–3	2–1	3–3	2–2	1–2	2–2	0–2	1–2	

Legend: Blue = home team win; Yellow = draw; Red = away team win.

== Top goalscorers ==
Source: welsh-premier.com

31 goals

- (Wales) Rhys Griffiths (Llanelli AFC)

25 goals

- (England) Martin Rose (Port Talbot Town)

24 goals

- (Wales) Marc Lloyd-Williams(Porthmadog FC)

20 goals

- (Scotland) Chris Sharp (Bangor City)
- (Wales) Neil Roberts (Rhyl FC)
- (Wales) Jack Christopher (Haverfordwest County)

18 goals

- (England) John Toner (The New Saints)

15 goals

- (England) Steve Rogers (Welshpool Town)
- (Wales) Paul Roberts (Welshpool Town)

14 goals

- (Wales) Nick Woodrow (Haverfordwest County)

== Awards ==
=== Monthly awards ===
Month	Manager of the Month		Player of the Month	
Month	Manager	Club	Player	Club
September	(England) Andy Cale	The New Saints	(Trinidad and Tobago) Josh Johnson	Rhyl
October	(Wales) Peter Nicholas	Llanelli	(Wales) Christian Edwards	Aberystwyth Town
November	(England) Darren Ryan	Newtown	(Wales) Neil Thomas	Haverfordwest County
December	(Republic of Ireland) Derek Brazil	Haverfordwest County	(Wales) Neil Roberts	Rhyl
January	(Wales) Mark Jones	Port Talbot Town	(Scotland) Chris Sharp	Bangor City
February	(Wales) Allan Bickerstaff	Rhyl	(England) Tommy Holmes	The New Saints
March	(Wales) Peter Nicholas	Llanelli	(England) Steve Rogers	Welshpool Town
April	(Wales) Mark Jones	Port Talbot Town	(Wales) Greg Strong	Rhyl

=== Annual awards ===
==== Team of the season ====
Nat.	Position	Name	Club
(Wales)	GK	Lee Idzi	Haverfordwest County
(Wales)	RB	Craig Williams	Newtown
(England)	CB	George Horan	Rhyl
(Wales)	CB	Stuart Jones	Llanelli
(Wales)	LB	Andy Legg	Llanelli
(Wales)	RM	Craig Jones	Rhyl
(Wales)	CM	Gareth Owen	Rhyl
(England)	CM	John Leah	The New Saints
(Wales)	LM	Sion Edwards	Bangor City
(Wales)	ST	Neil Roberts	Rhyl
(Wales)	ST	Rhys Griffiths	Llanelli

^{Source:}
