= Ian Griffiths (footballer) =

English footballer (born 1960)

Personal information
- Full name: Ian James Griffiths
- Date of birth: 17 April 1960 (age 66)
- Place of birth: Birkenhead, England
- Height: 5 ft 6 in (1.68 m)
- Position: Left winger

Youth career
- Tranmere Rovers

Senior career*
Years	Team	Apps	(Gls)
1978–1983	Tranmere Rovers	116	(5)
1983–1984	Rochdale	41	(5)
1984–1985	Port Vale	12	(0)
1985–1988	Wigan Athletic	82	(7)
1988–1990	Mazda Hiroshima		
1990–1991	Wigan Athletic	11	(0)
1991–1992	Wrexham	14	(0)
Total		276+	(17+)
- * Club domestic league appearances and goals

Ian James Griffiths (born 17 April 1960) is an English former footballer who played for Tranmere Rovers, Rochdale, Port Vale, Wigan Athletic, Mazda Hiroshima, and Wrexham. A winger, he scored 23 goals in 340 league and cup games in the English Football League between 1978 and 1992. He spent most of his career in the Third Division and Fourth Division, though he did manage to win a league title in Japan and also appeared in the 1991 Welsh Cup final.

== Career ==
Griffiths began his career with John King's Tranmere Rovers, who were relegated out of the Third Division at the end of the 1978–79 season. Rovers finished 15th in the Fourth Division in 1979–80, before slipping into the re-election zone in 1980–81 under the stewardship of new manager Bryan Hamilton. They rose to 11th in 1981–82, but ended the 1982–83 season just one point and one place above the re-election zone. He scored five goals in 116 league games in his five-year stay at Prenton Park. He then spent the 1983–84 campaign with Rochdale, and scored five goals in 41 league games for Jimmy Greenhoff's "Dale" in what turned out to be a brief stay at Spotland. He joined Fourth Division side Port Vale on trial in October 1984. He scored on his full debut at Vale Park, in a 4–1 win over Scunthorpe United in a second round FA Cup game on 7 December 1984. He enjoyed fairly regular first-team action but suffered a bizarre injury on 5 February 1985; he required a skin graft after he trapped a finger in the toilet door of the team coach. The following month he damaged his knee ligaments and never played for the club again. He played only 12 league and three cup games and was released at the end of the 1984–85 season by "Valiants" manager John Rudge.

He re-joined former boss Bryan Hamilton at Third Division Wigan Athletic, who went on to finish the 1985–86 season one point and one place outside the promotion places. New boss Ray Mathias led the club to a fourth-place finish in 1986–87, which earned the "Latics" a place in the newly created play-offs, though they were beaten by Swindon Town in the two-legged semi-finals. Wigan only managed a seventh-place finish in 1987–88 and missed out on the play-offs by a three-point margin. Griffiths scored seven goals in 82 league games during his first spell at Springfield Park. He then took off to Japan to spend two seasons with JSL side Mazda Hiroshima. Playing under former Japan international Kazuo Imanishi, Mazda finished as Second Division (West) champions in 1988–89 and then finished third in the amalgamated Second Division in 1989–90, just two points behind promoted Toyota Motors. He returned to Wigan, now back under the stewardship of Bryan Hamilton, to play 12 league games in the 1990–91 season. He was then traded to Wrexham in exchange for Gary Worthington. He spent the 1991–92 season with Welsh side Wrexham, and played 14 Fourth Division games for Brian Flynn's "Dragons", and also appeared in the 1991 Welsh Cup final defeat to Swansea City at Cardiff Arms Park. After departing the Racecourse Ground, he retired from professional football.

== Career statistics ==
Appearances and goals by club, season and competition
Club	Season	League			FA Cup		Other		Total	
Club	Season	Division	Apps	Goals	Apps	Goals	Apps	Goals	Apps	Goals
Tranmere Rovers	1978–79	Third Division	3	0	0	0	0	0	3	0
Tranmere Rovers	1979–80	Fourth Division	2	0	0	0	0	0	2	0
Tranmere Rovers	1980–81	Fourth Division	30	0	3	0	0	0	33	0
Tranmere Rovers	1981–82	Fourth Division	38	1	2	0	6	0	46	1
Tranmere Rovers	1982–83	Fourth Division	43	4	4	1	7	1	54	6
Tranmere Rovers	Total		116	5	9	1	13	1	138	7
Rochdale	1983–84	Fourth Division	40	5	2	0	3	1	45	6
Rochdale	1984–85	Fourth Division	1	0	0	0	0	0	1	0
Rochdale	Total		41	5	2	0	3	1	46	6
Port Vale	1984–85	Fourth Division	12	0	1	1	2	0	15	1
Wigan Athletic	1985–86	Third Division	38	3	4	0	7	1	49	4
Wigan Athletic	1986–87	Third Division	31	3	4	1	7	0	42	4
Wigan Athletic	1987–88	Third Division	13	1	0	0	6	0	19	1
Wigan Athletic	Total		82	7	8	1	20	1	110	9
Wigan Athletic	1990–91	Third Division	11	0	0	0	4	0	15	0
Wrexham	1990–91	Fourth Division	11	0	0	0	0	0	11	0
Wrexham	1991–92	Fourth Division	3	0	0	0	1	0	4	0
Wrexham	Total		14	0	0	0	1	0	15	0
Career total			276	17	20	3	43	3	339	23

== Honours ==
Mazda Hiroshima

- Japan Soccer League Second Division (West): 1988–89

Wrexham

- Welsh Cup runner-up: 1991
