= Kevin Hannon =

English footballer

Personal information
- Full name: Kevin Michael Hannon
- Date of birth: 4 May 1980 (age 46)
- Place of birth: Whiston, Merseyside, England
- Position: Defender

Senior career*
Years	Team	Apps	(Gls)
1999–2001	Wrexham	1	(0)
- * Club domestic league appearances and goals

Kevin Michael Hannon (born 4 May 1980) is an English former footballer who played in the Football League for Wrexham.

== Career ==
Hannon was born in Whiston, Merseyside and began his career with Welsh side Wrexham. He made his debut to the "Dragons" as a substitute in a 3–2 defeat at home to Stoke City on 25 September 1999. He sustained a serious leg break in a friendly against an Icelandic team and after a number of failed attempts at rehabilitation he had to retire from football.
