= Johnny Tapscott =

English footballer

Personal information
- Full name: Eli John Tapscott
- Date of birth: 29 April 1928
- Place of birth: Falmouth, England
- Date of death: 1981 (aged 52–53)
- Place of death: Plymouth, England
- Position: Left half

Youth career
- Leeds United

Senior career*
Years	Team	Apps	(Gls)
1949–1950	Leeds United	0	(0)
1950–1956	Wrexham	172	(4)
- Yeovil Town
- * Club domestic league appearances and goals

Eli John Tapscott (29 April 1928 – 1981) was an English footballer who played as a left half.

== Career ==
Starting out at Leeds United, Tapscott would make no senior appearances there. He moved to Wrexham in 1950, where he'd make 172 league appearances in 6 years before moving to non-league Yeovil Town.

Tapscott died in 1981.
