= Johnny Mortimer =

English footballer

Personal information
- Full name: Johnathan McCormick Mortimer
- Date of birth: 5 December 1923
- Place of birth: Birkenhead, England
- Date of death: 2013 (aged 89–90)
- Place of death: Wrexham, Wales
- Position: Full-back

Senior career*
Years	Team	Apps	(Gls)
1946–1949	Wrexham	23	(0)
1949–1951	New Brighton	5	(0)
- Ellesmere Port Town
- * Club domestic league appearances and goals

Johnathan McCormick "Johnny" Mortimer (5 December 1923 – July 2013) was an English professional footballer who played as a defender. He made appearances in the English football league with Wrexham and New Brighton.
