= Ian Griffiths (businessman) =

British businessman (born 1966)

Ian Ward Griffiths (born 1966) is a British businessman. He is a non-executive director of BBC Commercial and a Senior Adviser to Bain Capital.

Between 2020 and 2022 he was the CFO and deputy CEO of Kantar Group, a global data analytics and brand consulting company. During this time, he led the restructuring of the business following its acquisition from WPP plc by Bain Capital.

== Early life ==
Ian Ward Griffiths was born in September 1966. After being brought up and educated in North Wales, he gained a master's degree from Fitzwilliam College, Cambridge. He is a qualified accountant.

== Career ==
Griffiths worked for the accountants Ernst & Young for six years, before joining the magazines, radio and business media group Emap (Now Ascential) in 1994, and was group finance director from 2005 to 2008. He left the group in 2008 following the sale of the business to a combination of the Bauer family and Apax/GMG.

=== ITV ===
In 2008, Griffiths joined ITV plc as finance director.

Griffiths spent 10 years at ITV during a period of significant transformation. During this time ITV’s market capitalisation peaked in excess of £10 billion. Working alongside Adam Crozier and Archie Norman, Griffiths helped build the international Studios business to complement the UK Commercial Broadcast business, creating an integrated content business less reliant on UK advertising revenue.

He was the COO, CFO, and interim CEO of the media company ITV plc from May 2017 to December 2018, following Adam Crozier's departure after seven years as CEO.

Upon the appointment of Carolyn McCall as Group CEO in January 2018, Griffiths transitioned operations to a new leadership team before leaving the business in March 2019.

=== Kantar Group ===
Griffiths joined Kantar in January 2020, following its acquisition by Bain Capital in December 2019. He was additionally appointed Deputy CEO in June of that year.

In December 2022, it was announced that Griffiths would join the board of BBC Commercial Limited. He was a non-executive director of DS Smith plc from 2014 to 2018.

== Awards ==
In 2013, he won FTSE 100 FD of the Year.
