= Norman Sharp (footballer) =

English footballer

Personal information
- Full name: Norman Winslow Sharp
- Date of birth: 26 November 1919
- Place of birth: Liverpool, England
- Date of death: 1977 (aged 57–58)
- Position: Inside right

Senior career*
Years	Team	Apps	(Gls)
1938–1939	Everton	0	(0)
1946–1950	Wrexham	122	(16)
- * Club domestic league appearances and goals as of 14:40, 15 March 2018 (UTC)

Norman Winslow Sharp (26 November 1919 – 1977) was an English professional footballer who played as an inside-right.

== Career ==
Sharp joined Everton in November 1938, however he did not make a single senior appearance for the club. He did, however, guest for them 8 times during the war.

He also guested for Leeds United during the war.

After the war, he signed for Wrexham where he made his professional debut and would go on make 122 league appearances for Wrexham, before retiring from football.

Sharp died in 1977.
