= Bert Lumberg =

Welsh footballer

Personal information
- Date of birth: 20 May 1901
- Place of birth: Wales

Senior career*
Years	Team	Apps	(Gls)
1929–1930	Wrexham		
1930–1931	Wolverhampton Wanderers		

International career
1929–1931	Wales	4	(0)
- * Club domestic league appearances and goals

Arthur Albert Lumberg (20 May 1901 – date of death unknown), known as Bert Lumberg, was a Welsh international footballer. He was part of the Wales national football team between 1929 and 1931, playing 4 matches. He played his first match on 2 February 1929 against Ireland and his last match on 31 October 1931 against Scotland.

At club level, he played for Wrexham and Wolverhampton Wanderers.

== See also ==
- List of Wales international footballers (alphabetical)
