= Alan Hill (footballer, born 1955) =

English footballer

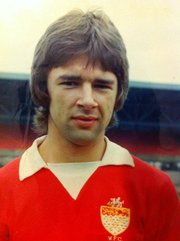
- Alan Hill during his time at Wrexham

Personal information
- Full name: Alan Hill
- Date of birth: 22 June 1955 (age 71)
- Place of birth: Chester, England
- Position: Defender

Youth career
- 1969–1974: Wrexham

Senior career*
Years	Team	Apps	(Gls)
1973–1983	Wrexham	199	(7)
1983–1984	Oswestry Town		
- * Club domestic league appearances and goals as of 17:24, 2 March 2018 (UTC)

Alan Hill (born 22 June 1955) is an English former professional footballer, spending most of his footballing career (and all of his professional footballing career) playing in the English Football League with Wrexham, making over 200 total appearances for the club.

== Career ==
Hill signed for Wrexham as a schoolboy. He made his first team debut in 1975 aged 19.

Hill would prove a versatile player, playing in nine different positions during his time at Wrexham, including a game as goalkeeper in the Welsh Cup.

After over 10 years at Wrexham, Hill would move to Oswestry Town for the final year of his career.
