= Josh Johnson (footballer, born 1981) =

Trinidadian footballer

Personal information
- Full name: Josh Thor Johnson
- Date of birth: 16 April 1981 (age 45)
- Place of birth: Carenage, Trinidad and Tobago
- Height: 5 ft 5 in (1.65 m)
- Position: Midfielder

Senior career*
Years	Team	Apps	(Gls)
1999–2006	San Juan Jabloteh	152	(29)
2006–2008	Wrexham	29	(1)
2008–2009	Rhyl	19	(4)
2009	Elements Cefn Druids	4	(0)
2009–2010	San Juan Jabloteh		
2010	Airbus UK Broughton	13	(1)
2010–?	A.F.C. Telford United	?	(?)

International career^{‡}
2001	Trinidad and Tobago U20		
2004	Trinidad and Tobago U23	1	(0)
- * Club domestic league appearances and goals as of 15:49, 7 September 2010 (UTC) ‡ National team caps and goals as of 15:49, 9 April 2009 (UTC)

Josh Thor Johnson (born 16 April 1981 in Carenage) is a footballer from Trinidad and Tobago, who plays as a midfielder. He has appeared for the Trinidad and Tobago national team.

== Career ==
=== Professional ===
Johnson began his career with San Juan Jabloteh in Trinidad and Tobago. He played there from 2000 until July 2006. Johnson had trials with Wrexham in July 2006, making a great impression. Denis Smith was very interested in Josh. Even though money was an issue at the time for Wrexham it did not stop him signing Johnson to the club on 8 August 2006. He made almost 30 appearances in the Football League for Wrexham, scoring one goal. He was released by Wrexham in May 2008 following the club's relegation to the Football Conference. Johnson joined Welsh Premier League club Rhyl in August 2008.

=== International ===
Johnson has represented Trinidad and Tobago internationally at various levels. He played for the U-20 national team at the 2001 CONCACAF U-20 Tournament in Trinidad and Tobago. He also played for the U-23 national team at the 2004 CONCACAF Men's Pre-Olympic Tournament in Mexico. He got his first call up to the senior team leading up to a matchup with Cuba during the third round of CONCACAF qualification for the 2010 FIFA World Cup. However, he has not made the match day roster for a senior team match.
