= David Walsh (Welsh footballer) =

Welsh footballer

Personal information
- Full name: David Walsh
- Date of birth: 29 April 1979 (age 47)
- Place of birth: Wrexham, Wales
- Height: 1.85 m (6 ft 1 in)
- Position: Goalkeeper

Youth career
- Wrexham

Senior career*
Years	Team	Apps	(Gls)
1997–2002	Wrexham	14	(0)
2001	→ Rhyl (loan)		
2004–2006	Caernarfon Town		
- * Club domestic league appearances and goals as of 16:47, 11 November 2017 (UTC)

David Walsh (born 29 April 1979) is a Welsh former footballer, who played as a goalkeeper for Wrexham, Rhyl and Caernarfon Town.

== Career ==
Having came up from Wrexham's youth system, Walsh signed his first professional contract with the club in 1997. Usually acting as back-up, he mostly got games in the FAW Welsh Cup during his early years. Making a few league appearances as back-up to Kevin Dearden, Walsh was loaned out to League Of Wales side Rhyl in 2001.

Walsh was released by Wrexham in May 2002. After appearing in a friendly for Shrewsbury Town in pre-season, and with various other clubs, including Rushden & Diamonds, Tranmere Rovers and Hereford United, Walsh was ultimately left without a club until being signed by Welsh Premier League side Caernarfon Town in 2004.

== Career statistics ==
Appearances and goals by club, season and competition
Club	Season	League			FA Cup		League Cup		Other		Total	
Club	Season	Division	Apps	Goals	Apps	Goals	Apps	Goals	Apps	Goals	Apps	Goals
Wrexham	1997–98	Second Division	0	0	0	0	0	0	0	0	0	0
Wrexham	1998–99	Second Division	0	0	0	0	0	0	0	0	0	0
Wrexham	1999–2000	Second Division	0	0	0	0	0	0	1	0	1	0
Wrexham	2000–01	Second Division	5	0	0	0	0	0	1	0	6	0
Wrexham	2001–02	Second Division	9	0	0	0	0	0	1	0	10	0
Wrexham	Total		14	0	0	0	0	0	3	0	17	0
