= Bobby Simpson (footballer, born 1889) =

English footballer

Personal information
- Full name: Robert Henry Simpson
- Date of birth: 4 January 1889
- Place of birth: Redcar, England
- Position: Full-back

Senior career*
Years	Team	Apps	(Gls)
1907	Old Corinthians		
1908	Teeside Amateurs		
1909	South Bank		
1910–1911	Blackburn Rovers	0	(0)
1911	Grangetown Athletic		
1911–1912	Bradford City	0	(0)
1912–1915	Everton	21	(0)
1919–1922	Wrexham	84	(0)
- * Club domestic league appearances and goals

Robert Henry Simpson (4 January 1889 – date of death unknown) was an English professional football who played as a full-back. He played in the English Football League for Everton and Wrexham, most notably being a part of Everton's 1914–15 First Division-winning squad.

== Career ==
Simpson played at amateur level for Old Corinthians, Teeside Amateurs, South Bank, and Grangetown Athletic early in his career, and also had trialist spells at Blackburn Rovers, and Bradford City.

His first professional club was Everton, who he signed for in 1911. He spent three years there and won the 1914–15 First Division, the last season before football was stopped due to the outbreak of the First World War.

Post-war, Simpson signed for Birmingham & District League side Wrexham in 1919, and was part of the squad when they came into the English Football League as founding members of the Third Division North in 1921.
