= Ed Bulling =

English footballer

Personal information
- Full name: Evelyn Bulling
- Date of birth: 1889
- Place of birth: Retford, England
- Date of death: 1963 (aged 73–74)
- Position: Right back

Senior career*
Years	Team	Apps	(Gls)
1910	Tottenham Hotspur	2	(0)
- * Club domestic league appearances and goals

Evelyn "Ed" Bulling (1889–1963) was an English professional footballer who played for Tottenham Hotspur.

== Football career ==
Bulling, a right back, began his career at Notts Olympic. He joined Tottenham Hotspur in 1910 where he made two appearances.
