= 1981–82 Tranmere Rovers F.C. season =

Tranmere Rovers F.C.
1981–82 season
- Manager: Bryan Hamilton
- Stadium: Prenton Park
- Fourth Division: 11th
- FA Cup: First Round
- League Cup: Fourth Round
colours

Tranmere Rovers F.C. played the 1981–82 season in the Football League Fourth Division, where they finished 11th of 24. They reached the first round of the FA Cup, and the fourth round of the League Cup.

== League table ==
Pos	Team	Pld	W	D	L	GF	GA	GD	Pts
9	Bury	46	17	17	12	80	59	+21	68
10	Hereford United	46	16	19	11	64	58	+6	67
11	Tranmere Rovers	46	14	18	14	51	56	−5	60
12	Blackpool	46	15	13	18	66	60	+6	58
13	Darlington	46	15	13	18	61	62	−1	58
