= Billy Rogers (footballer) =

Welsh footballer

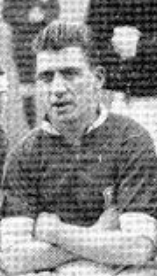
- Billy Rogers, Welsh international footballer, before Scotland v Wales in 1930

Personal information
- Full name: William Rogers
- Date of birth: 1905
- Place of birth: Summerhill, Wrexham, Wales
- Date of death: January 1936 (aged 30–31)
- Place of death: Penyffordd, Wrexham, Wales
- Position: Right half

Youth career
- 1925–26: Flint Town

Senior career*
Years	Team	Apps	(Gls)
1926–1932	Wrexham	171	(28)
1932–1933	Newport County	21	(3)
1933	Bristol Rovers	0	(0)
1933–1934	Leyton Orient	3	(0)
Total		195	(31)

International career
1930	Wales	2	(0)
- * Club domestic league appearances and goals

Billy Rogers (1905–1936) was a Welsh international footballer. He was part of the Wales national football team, playing 2 matches. He played his first match on 25 October 1930 against Scotland and his last match on 22 November 1930 against England.

== Career ==
He played 2 matches for the Wales national football team in the British Home Championship. He played his first match on 25 October 1930 against Scotland at Ibrox, drawing 1–1, and his second on 22 November 1930 against England at Wrexham's Racecourse Ground, losing 4–0.

He had been previously picked for the FAW's uncapped tour of Canada in 1929.

He started his career as an amateur at Flint Town. He signed professional terms with Wrexham in 1926, and played for them from 1926 until 1931. He was a member of the FAW Welsh Cup-winning side of 1931.

He subsequently played for Newport County, Bristol Rovers, and Clapton Orient, whom he left for Bangor City, a non-league team, at the end of the 1933–34 season.

== Later life and death ==
He was unknowingly diagnosed with Hodgkin's Disease in 1931, a terminal cancer, which contributed to his death in January 1936 from tuberculosis, aged 30.

During the period from 1931 to 1934 he continued to play professionally unaware of his condition, with only his wife being informed. He left behind his wife, Gwennith, and a two month old son Billy.

== Honours ==
Wrexham

- Welsh Cup winner: 1930–31

== See also ==
- List of Wales international footballers (alphabetical)
