= Phil Hardy (footballer) =

Irish footballer (born 1973)

Personal information
- Full name: Philip Hardy
- Date of birth: 9 April 1973 (age 53)
- Place of birth: Ellesmere Port, England
- Height: 5 ft 7 in (1.70 m)
- Position: Left-back

Youth career
- Wrexham

Senior career*
Years	Team	Apps	(Gls)
1990–2001	Wrexham	349	(1)
2001–2002	Port Vale	8	(1)
Total		357	(2)

International career
	Republic of Ireland under-21	3	(0)
- * Club domestic league appearances and goals

Philip Hardy (born 9 April 1973) is an English-born former Ireland under-21 footballer who played as a left-back. With Welsh club Wrexham from 1990 to 2001, he played more than 450 games under manager Brian Flynn. He was named on the PFA Team of the Year for the 1991–92 Fourth Division campaign. He picked up both a winners and runners-up medal in the Welsh Cup. During his time at the club, Wrexham reached four FAW Premier Cup finals, winning on three occasions, and were also promoted out of the Third Division in 1992–93. He later played ten games for Port Vale, before leaving the professional game in 2002.

== Club career ==
Hardy started his career with Fourth Division Wrexham, signing professionally for Brian Flynn's side in 1990. He played in the Welsh Cup final at the Cardiff Arms Park in 1991, in what finished as a 2–0 win for Swansea City. An ever-present in the 1991–92 season, along with fellow full-back Andy Thackeray, he played in the club's giant-killing of Arsenal in the FA Cup Third Round. They were eventually defeated by West Ham United in the next round, following a replay. For his performances, Hardy was named on the PFA Team of the Year.

Following the creation of the Premier League, Wrexham spent the 1992–93 season in the Third Division. A second-place finish then won the club promotion into the Second Division. The "Red Dragons" held their own in the third tier and remained in the division for the rest of Hardy's time at the club.

He captained the side in the 1995 Welsh Cup final victory over Cardiff City, in his second appearance in a cup final. Wrexham equalled a club record by reaching the FA Cup quarter-finals in 1996–97, beating Colwyn Bay, Scunthorpe United, West Ham United, Peterborough United and Birmingham City on the way. Drawn against Chesterfield, also of the Third Division, a 1–0 defeat at Saltergate prevented the club from making a first-ever appearance in the FA Cup semi-finals. However, Hardy was limited to just 16 appearances throughout the 1996–97 season.

He posted 39 appearances in 1997–98, picking up seven yellow cards. Wrexham became the inaugural winners of the FAW Premier Cup in 1998, beating Cardiff City 2–1 at the Racecourse Ground. He played 42 games in 1998–99, and at the end of the season Wrexham played in the 1999 FAW Premier Cup final, losing out 2–1 to Barry Town. He played 45 games in 1999–2000, and Wrexham won the FAW Premier Cup for a third time in 2000, following a 2–0 victory over Cardiff City. Throughout the campaign, he was sent off against Luton Town and Bristol Rovers, and scored his first league goal with a penalty in a 1–0 win over Colchester United on 24 April.

He made just 14 appearances in 2000–01, as Wrexham reached the FAW Premier Cup final for a fourth time in 2001, and beat Swansea City 2–0 at Vetch Field. He departed the club at the end of the campaign. Despite being granted a testimonial match for serving the club for more than ten years and playing over 450 games (in all competitions), financial problems from the 2001 season onwards meant that he never received the game.

In June 2001, he signed with Brian Horton's Port Vale. He scored on his league debut for the "Valiants" on 25 August, helping Vale to beat Peterborough United 4–1 at Vale Park. However, he was out of the first-team picture by October. He was transfer listed in November. Chester City expressed interest in signing him on loan the following month. He joined Luton Town on trial in January 2002, but manager Joe Kinnear decided that Hardy was too small for the Third Division. With ten appearances to his name in 2001–02, he left Vale in April 2002. In November that year had a trial with Mansfield Town. However, the 29-year-old failed to find a contract at another Football League club, and announced his retirement.

== International career ==
Hardy earned three caps for the Republic of Ireland U21 side.

On 29 May 1993, Hardy was a member of an Irish side which played Hungary in a testimonial for David O'Leary, coming on as a substitute for Steve Staunton; the Hungarians won the match 4–2. Although the rest of the Irish team were past or future internationals, the match has not been granted full international status.

== Post-retirement ==
After retiring, Hardy went on to a career in engineering before becoming a driver for a factory in Ellesmere Port.

== Career statistics ==
Appearances and goals by club, season and competition
Club	Season	League			FA Cup		Other		Total	
Club	Season	Division	Apps	Goals	Apps	Goals	Apps	Goals	Apps	Goals
Wrexham	1989–90	Fourth Division	1	0	0	0	0	0	1	0
Wrexham	1990–91	Fourth Division	32	0	1	0	5	0	38	0
Wrexham	1991–92	Fourth Division	42	0	5	0	8	0	55	0
Wrexham	1992–93	Third Division	32	0	1	0	5	0	38	0
Wrexham	1993–94	Second Division	25	0	2	0	7	0	34	0
Wrexham	1994–95	Second Division	44	0	4	0	8	0	56	0
Wrexham	1995–96	Second Division	42	0	4	0	7	0	53	0
Wrexham	1996–97	Second Division	13	0	6	0	2	0	21	0
Wrexham	1997–98	Second Division	34	0	4	0	1	0	39	0
Wrexham	1998–99	Second Division	33	0	4	0	5	0	42	0
Wrexham	1999–2000	Second Division	38	1	5	0	2	0	45	1
Wrexham	2000–01	Second Division	13	0	0	0	1	0	14	0
Wrexham	Total		349	1	36	0	51	0	436	1
Port Vale	2001–02	Second Division	8	1	0	0	2	0	10	1
Career total			357	2	36	0	53	0	446	2

== Honours ==
Individual

- PFA Team of the Year: 1991–92 Fourth Division
