= John Leah =

Welsh footballer

Personal information
- Full name: John David Leah
- Date of birth: 3 August 1978 (age 48)
- Place of birth: Shrewsbury, England
- Height: 5 ft 9 in (1.75 m)
- Position: Midfielder

Senior career*
Years	Team	Apps	(Gls)
1996–1997	Llansantffraid	25	(1)
1997–1998	Total Network Solutions	27	(3)
1998	Newtown	4	(1)
1998–2000	Darlington	7	(1)
2000–2001	Newtown	31	(8)
2001–2006	Total Network Solutions	98	(6)
2006–2009	The New Saints	87	(14)
2009–2011	Rhyl	33	(3)
2011–2012	Airbus UK		
2012–2014	Rhyl F.C.		
- * Club domestic league appearances and goals as of 00:20, 4 May 2010 (UTC)

John David Leah (born 3 August 1978) is a retired footballer who played as a midfielder. He briefly played in the Football League for Darlington.

== Career ==
Leah began his career as a youth team player with Llansantffraid, making his first team debut in August 1996. After a short spell with Newtown, Leah joined Football League Third Division side Darlington where he made 10 appearances in all competitions before returning to Newtown in 2000. In 2001, Leah rejoined Total Network Solutions and remained with the side following their renaming as The New Saints in 2006, being named Welsh Premier League Player of the Year for the 2006–07 season.

Leah was released by The New Saints in April 2009, instead signing with Rhyl. Financial problems at the club saw Leah almost return to Newtown during the 2010 January transfer window however, after rejecting the move, Leah was named captain of the club.

In January 2011 he moved to Airbus UK. After a year and a half at Airbus, John returned to Rhyl F.C.

== Personal life ==
He studied for a degree in Physiotherapy at the University of Salford and graduated in the summer of 2011.

== Honours ==
- Welsh Premier League Player of the Season: 2006–07
- Welsh Premier League Team of the Year: 2006–07, 2007–08, 2008–09
