= 1997–98 FAW Premier Cup group stage =

Welsh football tournament

The 1997–98 FAW Premier Cup group stage matches took place between September and December 1997.

== Groups ==
=== Group A ===
Team	Pld	W	D	L	GF	GA	GD	Pts	BAR	BAN	SWA	CON
(Wales) Barry Town	6	5	0	1	23	5	+18	15	—	0–3	2–3	9–0
(Wales) Bangor City	6	3	1	2	8	5	+3	10	1–2	—	1–0	4–0
(England) Swansea City	6	2	2	2	7	6	+1	8	1–2	1–1	—	0–0
(Wales) Conwy United	6	0	1	5	0	22	−22	1	0–6	0–1	0–2	—

Legend: Blue = home team win; Yellow = draw; Red = away team win.

Barry Town (Wales)	3 – 0	(Wales) Bangor City
Ryan; E.Williams	Report

Jenner Park, Barry

Conwy United (Wales)	0 – 2	(England) Swansea City
	Report	Jones; Bird

Y Morfa, Conwy

=== Group B ===
Team	Pld	W	D	L	GF	GA	GD	Pts	CAR	WRE	NEW	MER
(England) Cardiff City	6	3	3	0	7	4	+3	12	—	1–1	3–2	1–0
(England) Wrexham	6	3	2	1	11	5	+6	11	0–1	—	1–0	5–1
(Wales) Newtown	6	1	3	2	2	9	−7	6	1–1	2–2	—	2–2
(England) Merthyr Tydfil	6	0	2	4	4	12	−8	2	0–0	0–2	1–2	—

Legend: Blue = home team win; Yellow = draw; Red = away team win.

== See also ==
- 1997–98 in Welsh football
