= Mark Morris (footballer, born 1968) =

English footballer

Personal information
- Date of birth: 1 August 1968 (age 58)
- Place of birth: Chester, England
- Position: Goalkeeper

Youth career
- Wrexham

Senior career*
Years	Team	Apps	(Gls)
1985–1994	Wrexham	101	(0)
1994–1999	Runcorn	?	(0)
2001	Wrexham	0	(0)
- * Club domestic league appearances and goals

Mark Morris (born 1 August 1968) is an English former professional footballer who played as a goalkeeper.

== Career ==
Born in Chester, Morris played for Wrexham and Runcorn. While at Wrexham, he was Player of the Season during 1990–91.

He was released in the summer of 1994 and joined Runcorn. He later served as football in the community officer at Wrexham and rejoined the playing staff on non contract terms in 2001 as the club was suffering a financial crisis and were unable to bring in a goalkeeper on loan. He was named on the bench on a few occasions, but did not feature in a match.

Morris currently serves as the goalkeeping coach for the Liverpool U23s and the Northern Ireland U17s, having previously coached at Wrexham, Chesterfield, Hereford and Southport.
