= Matt Lawrence (Welsh footballer) =

English footballer

Personal information
- Full name: Matthew Lawrence
- Date of birth: 3 April 1909
- Place of birth: Cefn-y-Bedd, Wrexham, Wales
- Date of death: 1999 (aged 89–90)
- Position: Half-back

Senior career*
Years	Team	Apps	(Gls)
- Cross Street
1930–1937	Wrexham	132	(4)
1937–1939	Hull City	25	(1)
- * Club domestic league appearances and goals

Matt Lawrence (3 April 1909 – April 1999) was a Welsh professional footballer who played as a half-back. He made over 150 appearances in the English Football League between spells at Wrexham and Hull City, before his playing career was cut short by the Second World War.

Lawrence died in Wrexham in 1999, just weeks after his 90th birthday.
