= Les Speed =

Welsh footballer

Personal information
- Full name: Leslie Speed
- Date of birth: 3 October 1923
- Place of birth: Caergwrle, Wales
- Date of death: 5 June 2012 (aged 88)
- Place of death: Wrexham, Wales
- Position: Full-back

Senior career*
Years	Team	Apps	(Gls)
- Llandudno
1945–1955	Wrexham	211	(0)
- Stafford Rangers
- Holywell Town

Managerial career
- Stafford Rangers
- Holywell Town
- * Club domestic league appearances and goals

Leslie Speed (3 October 1923 – 5 June 2012) was a Welsh professional footballer. He made over 200 appearances in the Football League with Wrexham.

== Career ==
Speed guested for Chelsea and Portsmouth during the Second World War.

After the war he signed for Wrexham, where he spent 10 years and made over 200 appearances for the club.

After leaving Wrexham, he went on appear for Stafford Rangers and Holywell Town as player-manager.

== Death ==
Speed died on 5 June 2012 after suffering from Alzheimer's disease.
