= Jim Bulling =

English footballer born in 1909

Personal information
- Full name: James Bulling
- Date of birth: 12 February 1909
- Place of birth: West Bridgford, Nottinghamshire, England
- Position: Wing half

Senior career*
Years	Team	Apps	(Gls)
1926–1927	Nottingham Forest	0	(0)
1927–1930	Shirebrook		
1930–1932	Leicester City	12	(0)
1932–1936	Wrexham	111	(3)
- Shrewsbury Town
- * Club domestic league appearances and goals

James Bulling (born 12 February 1909) was an English professional footballer who played as a wing-half. He made appearances in the English Football League for Leicester City and Wrexham.
