= Craig Skinner (footballer) =

English footballer

Personal information
- Date of birth: 21 October 1970 (age 56)
- Place of birth: Manchester, England
- Height: 5 ft 9 in (1.75 m)
- Position: Midfielder

Senior career*
Years	Team	Apps	(Gls)
1989–1992	Blackburn Rovers	16	(1)
1992–1995	Plymouth Argyle	53	(4)
1995–1999	Wrexham	87	(10)
1999–2001	York City	10	(0)
2001	Leigh RMI	5	(0)
2001–2002	Northwich Victoria	5	(0)
Total		176	(14)
- * Club domestic league appearances and goals

Craig Skinner (born 21 October 1970) is an English former professional footballer who played as a midfielder in the Football League.

== Career ==
Skinner was born in Manchester. He made 16 appearances for Blackburn Rovers before moving to Plymouth Argyle, managed by Peter Shilton, in summer 1992.

Having made almost 100 appearances in three years for Plymouth Argyle he left the club for Wrexham for a transfer fee of £50,000. In the 1998–99 season he had injury problems.

Skinner joined York City on deadline day in March 1999 from Wrexham for a reported transfer of £30,000. He signed a three-year contract.

He suffered knee ligament damage in pre-season ahead of the 1999–2000 season and in November 1999, shortly after returning to training, he injured his knee again. He was transfer-listed in early 2000.

In the 2000–01 season Skinner turned down offers from York City to end his contract. As of April 2001, he had not made an appearance during the season and had been left out of reserve squads. He had been transfer-listed and had successfully appealed against his dismissal at the club.
