= Paul Barrett (footballer) =

English footballer

Personal information
- Full name: Paul David Barrett
- Date of birth: 13 April 1978 (age 48)
- Place of birth: Newcastle upon Tyne, England
- Height: 5 ft 11 in (1.80 m)
- Position: Midfielder

Youth career
- ?–1996: Newcastle United

Senior career*
Years	Team	Apps	(Gls)
1996–1998	Newcastle United	0	(0)
1998–2004	Wrexham	120	(5)
2004–2005	Blyth Spartans		

International career
1996	England U18	2	(0)
- * Club domestic league appearances and goals

Paul David Barrett (born 13 April 1978) is an English former footballer who played in the Football League for Wrexham.
