= Gareth Owen (footballer, born 1971) =

Welsh footballer

Personal information
- Date of birth: 21 October 1971 (age 55)
- Place of birth: Chester, England
- Position: Midfielder

Youth career
- Wrexham

Senior career*
Years	Team	Apps	(Gls)
1989–2001	Wrexham	298	(37)
2001–2003	Doncaster Rovers	53	(7)
2003	→ Northwich Victoria (loan)	2	(0)
2003–2005	Connah's Quay Nomads		
2005–2008	Airbus UK Broughton	89	(13)
2008–2011	Rhyl		

International career
	Wales Under-21	8	
	Wales B	1	

Managerial career
- 2005–2008: Airbus UK Broughton (Player/Manager)
- 2011–2012: Airbus UK (Head Coach)
- 2015–2016: Rhyl
- 2021–: Wrexham Women U19
- * Club domestic league appearances and goals

Gareth Owen (born 21 October 1971) is a Welsh former footballer, who played as a midfielder for various English and Welsh clubs between 1989 and 2011. He is the manager of Wrexham AFC Women Under 19s.

== Career ==
=== Club career ===
Owen spent twelve years as a professional at Wrexham, and was rewarded by a testimonial match against Manchester United in 2000 which drew a crowd of 13,000 to the Racecourse Ground. He then spent two years at Doncaster Rovers before moving to Connah's Quay Nomads. He joined Airbus UK Broughton in August 2005 as Player-Manager.

In July 2008 he moved to Rhyl on a one-year deal to play under his former assistant manager at Airbus, Allan Bickerstaff. In May 2009 he was named as the Welsh Premier League's Player of the Season. He remained at the club for three years before returning to Airbus in June 2011 as head coach.

He also works in North Wales as Football Development Officer with Flintshire County Council, where one of key roles is to develop women's football in the region.

He was appointed head coach at Airbus UK in 2011 but left the club in January 2012 when Andy Preece's management team was appointed.

In the summer of 2021 Owen was appointed manager of Wrexham AFC Women's under-19s, guiding them to a league title in their first campaign.

=== International ===
Owen was capped by Wales at Under 21 level and 'B' international level. He was called up to the full international team in 1998 but did not play.

== Personal life ==
He has been married to Gemma Owen since 2016. Gemma is Head of Women's Football Operations at Wrexham and is also Assistant Manager of the Women's Under-19s team.

On 11 September 2023, Owen suffered an ischemic stroke.

== Honours ==
=== Player ===
Wrexham

- Third Division runner-up: 1992–93
- Welsh Cup: 1994–95; runner-up: 1990–91
- FAW Premier Cup: 1997–98, 1999–2000, 2000–01

Rhyl

- Welsh Premier League: 2008–09

Individual

- PFA Team of the Year: 1992–93 Third Division
- Welsh Premier League Player of the Season: 2008–09
- Welsh Premier League Team of the Year: 2008–09.

=== Manager ===
Wrexham Women

- Genaro Adran North U19: 2021–22
