= Jonathan Cross (footballer) =

English footballer

Personal information
- Full name: Jonathan Neil Cross
- Date of birth: 2 March 1975 (age 51)
- Place of birth: Wallasey, England
- Position: Full back

Senior career*
Years	Team	Apps	(Gls)
1991–1998	Wrexham	119	(12)
1997	→ Hereford United (loan)	5	(1)
1998–2000	Chester City	52	(1)
- Colwyn Bay
Total		176	(14)
- * Club domestic league appearances and goals

Jonathan Neil Cross (born 2 March 1975) is a footballer who played as a full back in the Football League for Wrexham, Hereford United and Chester City.
