= Mark Sertori =

English footballer

Personal information
- Full name: Mark Anthony Sertori
- Date of birth: 1 September 1967 (age 59)
- Place of birth: Manchester, England
- Height: 6 ft 2 in (1.88 m)
- Positions: Defender; striker

Senior career*
Years	Team	Apps	(Gls)
?–1987	East Manchester		
1987	Stockport County	4	(0)
1987–1990	Lincoln City	78	(15)
1990–1994	Wrexham	110	(3)
1994–1996	Bury	13	(1)
1996	→ Witton Albion (loan)		
1996–1998	Scunthorpe United	83	(2)
1998–1999	Halifax Town	45	(0)
1999–2001	York City	66	(2)
2001	Shrewsbury Town	1	(0)
2001	Cheltenham Town	10	(0)
2001–2002	Altrincham		
2002–2003	Accrington Stanley		
2003	Hyde United	11	(0)
- * Club domestic league appearances and goals

Mark Anthony Sertori (born 1 September 1967) is an English former footballer. He played for numerous clubs in the lower divisions of the Football League, initially as a striker before moving to centre-back. His last job position was Director of performance for Roma.

== Career ==
Born in Manchester, Lancashire, Sertori played for East Manchester before signing for Stockport County in February 1987. He made four league appearances before signing for Football Conference side Lincoln City in 1987, who he made his debut for in a 4–2 defeat at Barnet on 22 August. He finished the 1987–88 season with 28 league appearances and six goals as Lincoln won the Conference championship.

He moved to York City in September 1999 for a fee of £25,000 with Sertori agreeing a two-year contract. In March 2001, he had three clubs in a week. He departed York for Shrewsbury Town, making a single substitute appearance, before joining Cheltenham Town.

He dropped into non-League football in the summer of 2001, joining Altrincham. In November 2001 he captained a Northern Premier League representative XI against an FA representative XI. In July 2002 he signed for Accrington Stanley before moving on to Hyde United in January 2003. He retired at the end of the season to concentrate on his new career as a sports masseur.

== Sports masseur ==
At the tail-end of his professional career, Sertori enrolled on a Professional Footballers' Association-funded course at Cardiff, where he graduated as a masseur as well as qualifying in reflexology and aromatherapy. In 2003, he joined Bolton Wanderers as Sports Therapist and Masseur. He followed Sam Allardyce to Newcastle United whilst maintaining a private practice in Stockport. He is masseur at Manchester City.

=== England masseur ===
An Italian speaker, Sertori replaced the long-serving Chelsea masseur Billy McCulloch as a masseur for the England team under Fabio Capello, being one of three masseurs in England's 17-man technical staff for the 2010 FIFA World Cup. His role with England continued and he was part of the England 2016 European Championship backroom staff.
