= Neil Roberts (Welsh footballer) =

Welsh footballer

Personal information
- Date of birth: 7 April 1978 (age 48)
- Place of birth: Wrexham, Wales
- Position: Striker

Senior career*
Years	Team	Apps	(Gls)
1994–2000	Wrexham	75	(17)
2000–2004	Wigan Athletic	125	(19)
2002	→ Hull City (loan)	6	(0)
2004	→ Bradford City (loan)	3	(1)
2004–2006	Doncaster Rovers	61	(8)
2006–2008	Wrexham	55	(11)
2008–2009	Rhyl	33	(20)
Total		358	(76)

International career
	Wales U21	3	(0)
1999–2004	Wales	4	(0)
- * Club domestic league appearances and goals

Neil Roberts (born 7 April 1978) is a Welsh former professional footballer who played as a striker. He is working as a project manager for Manchester City.

Roberts started his professional playing career with local Welsh side Wrexham in 1994. He moved to English side Wigan Athletic in 2000, and later from there to Doncaster Rovers in 2004. Roberts was first capped for the Wales national team in 1999, earning four caps for the senior team until 2004. He retired from football in 2009, following the end of his contract with Rhyl F.C.

== Career ==
Roberts started his career in 1994 when he played for Wrexham. After signing for the club as a trainee, he made his debut on 27 September 1997 during a 0–0 draw with Chesterfield before going on to score five goals in his next four games. He became an established first-team player at the Racecourse Ground, making 75 appearances and scoring 17 goals. He left Wrexham in 2000 to join Wigan Athletic, where he made 125 appearances and scoring 19 goals. He also spent time on loan at Hull City and Bradford City, scoring on his debut for the latter against Bristol City. He then made a permanent move to Doncaster Rovers in 2004.

In 2006 Roberts came back to his hometown club Wrexham, where he became the team captain. He is a Welsh international with four caps. Roberts had a good start to the 2006–07 season by scoring two goals in the first two games. These goals were very important during this period as they were a penalty in a 2–1 away victory against local rivals Chester City on 20 August 2006 and the opening goal in Wrexham's 4–1 League Cup victory at Championship side Sheffield Wednesday on 23 August 2006.

However, in their 2–1 victory against Swindon Town on 9 September 2006, Roberts picked up an injury. He made his comeback in a 2–1 defeat against Milton Keynes Dons scoring the opening goal. However, Roberts suffered more injuries throughout the course of the season. On 21 April 2007 he came on as a second-half substitute in a game against Torquay United and scored his first goal since October 2006 and Wrexham's winning goal to ensure a vital 1–0 win in Wrexham's bid for survival in the Football League Two. He was released by Wrexham in May 2008 following the club's relegation to the Football Conference.

On 24 June 2008, Roberts signed for Welsh Premier League side Rhyl, where he combined playing with coaching opportunities and his business interests. After one season at Rhyl, Roberts left to take over as a project manager at Premier League side Manchester City.

== Personal life ==
Neil's brother Stephen also played for Wrexham between 1998 and 2005, while his daughter Mia Roberts played for Wrexham A.F.C. Women until she left the team on 11 August 2023.

He is currently the proprietor of a Wrexham pub known as Vault 33 where his other children Sam Roberts and Macy Roberts work with him

== Honours ==
Wigan Athletic

- Football League Second Division: 2002–03

Individual

- Welsh Premier League Team of the Year: 2008–09
