= Mark Cartwright =

English footballer

Personal information
- Full name: Mark Neville Cartwright
- Date of birth: 13 January 1973 (age 53)
- Place of birth: Chester, England
- Height: 6 ft 2 in (1.88 m)
- Position: Goalkeeper

Senior career*
Years	Team	Apps	(Gls)
1990–1991	York City	0	(0)
1991–1994	Stockport County	0	(0)
1994–1999	Wrexham	37	(0)
1999	→ Bury (loan)	0	(0)
2000–2001	Brighton & Hove Albion	13	(0)
2002–2003	Shrewsbury Town	27	(0)
2003–2005	Halifax Town	32	(0)
Total		109	(0)

Managerial career
- 2006: Leek Town
- * Club domestic league appearances and goals

Mark Neville Cartwright (born 13 January 1973) is an English former footballer and manager. He was most recently sporting director at Huddersfield Town.

== Playing career ==
Cartwright was born in Chester and played as a goalkeeper with York City, Stockport County before making his professional debut for Wrexham in 1996. He was a bit-part player at Wrexham until the 1998–99 season where he played in 43 matches and produced a fine performance in a 0–0 draw at Manchester City. However, he was overlooked in favour of Kevin Dearden and joined Brighton & Hove Albion in 2000. He played in 15 matches for the Seagulls in 2000–01 helping the side win the Third Division title. He joined Shrewsbury Town in July 2001 where he spent two seasons before retiring due to injury.

He later had a short spell as manager of Leek Town in 2006 before resigning due to work commitments. He later became goalkeeping coach at Livingston, and following this became involved with Colwyn Bay.

He played for Florida Institute of Technology Panthers in Melbourne, Florida during a period when the team recorded 56 wins, 5 losses, and 2 ties. During this time, the Panthers won three consecutive Sunshine State Conference crowns, the 1991 National Collegiate Athletic Association Division II National Championship, and had an undefeated season in 1992. He graduated with a business degree in 1992, and was inducted in the college's Hall of Fame in 2016.

== Later career ==
He was a football agent for Beswicks Sports, his client list included Adam Yates and Liam Bridcutt. He was also involved in a number of overseas transfers from the United States to Korea.

On 10 December 2012 Cartwright was appointed technical director at Premier League club Stoke City. In July 2019 it was announced that Cartwright will leave his position at Stoke on 13 September 2019.

On 3 July 2023, Cartwright was announced as the new Sporting Director at Huddersfield Town. On 18 April 2025, he was sacked from his role.

== Career statistics ==
Appearances and goals by club, season and competition
Club	Season	League			FA Cup		League Cup		Other^{[A]}		Total	
Club	Season	Division	Apps	Goals	Apps	Goals	Apps	Goals	Apps	Goals	Apps	Goals
Wrexham	1996–97	Second Division	3	0	1	0	0	0	0	0	4	0
Wrexham	1997–98	Second Division	4	0	0	0	0	0	0	0	4	0
Wrexham	1998–99	Second Division	30	0	5	0	2	0	6	0	43	0
Wrexham	1999–2000	Second Division	0	0	0	0	0	0	0	0	0	0
Brighton & Hove Albion	2000–01	Third Division	13	0	2	0	0	0	0	0	15	0
Shrewsbury Town	2001–02	Third Division	14	0	1	0	0	0	0	0	15	0
Shrewsbury Town	2002–03	Third Division	13	0	0	0	0	0	0	0	15	0
Halifax Town	2003–04	Conference Premier	32	0	0	0	0	0	4	0	36	0
Career Total			109	0	9	0	2	0	10	0	130	0

A. The "Other" column constitutes appearances and goals in the Football League Trophy.

== Honours ==
Brighton & Hove Albion

- Football League Third Division: 2000–01
