= Karl Connolly =

English footballer

Personal information
- Full name: Karl Andrew Connolly
- Date of birth: 9 February 1970 (age 56)
- Place of birth: Prescot, England
- Positions: Winger; striker

Senior career*
Years	Team	Apps	(Gls)
1991–2000	Wrexham	358	(88)
2000–2003	Queens Park Rangers	72	(12)
2003–2004	Swansea City	10	(1)
2004–2008	Prescot Cables		
2008	NEWI Cefn Druids	12	(3)
2008–2009	Prescot Cables		
2009–2011	Warrington Town		
- * Club domestic league appearances and goals

Karl Andrew Connolly (born 9 February 1970) is an English former footballer who played for Wrexham, Queens Park Rangers, and Swansea City.

== Football career ==
Connolly started his football career at Napoli, in the Liverpool Sunday League, where he was spotted by a Wrexham scout, and was signed by the then Wrexham manager Brian Flynn, initially to play in a left-wing position. However, following the departure of Gary Bennett to Tranmere Rovers in 1995, Connolly was played as the main striker. Connolly went on to score 88 goals in 358 league games.

Connolly played in many of Wrexham's finest FA Cup games, including the 2–1 win against Arsenal, the 2–1 win against Ipswich Town, the magnificent cup run of 1996–97, and the 2–1 victory over Middlesbrough in 1999.

== After leaving Wrexham ==
Karl joined Queens Park Rangers on a Bosman free transfer in the summer of 2000, where he played 72 League games scoring 12 goals, mostly from a left-wing position. He left QPR to join Swansea City in the summer of 2003. He went on to score twice for the club, with strikes coming against Bristol City in the League Cup and Yeovil Town in the league. A spell at Prescot Cables followed, and then he returned to the Wrexham area, to play for NEWI Cefn Druids in January 2008. He re-signed for Prescot in the summer of 2008. Joined Warrington Town in August 2009 and retired from the game in 2011 at the age of 41.

== Honours ==
Wrexham

- Welsh Cup winner: 1995

Individual

- PFA Team of the Year: 1995–96 Second Division
