= List of Wrexham A.F.C. records and statistics =

Wrexham Association Football Club is a professional association football club based in Wrexham, Wales. The club competes in EFL Championship, the second tier of the English football league system since 2025–26, following three successive promotions from the National League. This is the first time this has ever been done in English Football history.

The club was founded in 1864, making it the oldest club in Wales and the third-oldest professional team in the world. In 1890, it joined The Combination league, before spells in the Welsh Senior League and Birmingham & District League. They remained in this division before being elected to the Football League in 1921. Wrexham would spend the next 37 years in the Third Division North until they were placed in the Third Division as part of the League re-structuring in 1958. Wrexham would subsequently fluctuate between the Third and Fourth Divisions before earning promotion to the Second Division as champions in 1978. By 1983, Wrexham had experienced two consecutive relegations to leave them back in the Fourth Division once again. In the early 21st century, Wrexham would experience severe financial issues and despite a triumph in the Football League Trophy in 2004–05, they would be relegated from the Football League for the first time in 2008. After five unsuccessful play-off attempts, Wrexham would finally win the National League in 2023 after a 15-year exile in non-League.

Wrexham have won the Welsh Cup a record 23 times, the Football League Trophy in 2005, and the FA Trophy in 2013. They have gained one promotion from the third tier, six promotions from the fourth tier, and one promotion from the fifth tier. Wrexham's record league appearance maker is Arfon Griffiths with 592 appearances, whilst their top goalscorer is Tommy Bamford with 175 league goals. Their highest recorded attendance is 34,445 for an FA Cup tie with Manchester United in 1957.

== Honours and achievements ==
Wrexham AFC's honours include:

League

- Third Division North / Third Division / League One (level 3)
  - Champions: 1977–78
  - Runners-up: 1932–33, 2024–25
- Fourth Division / Third Division / League Two (level 4)
  - Runners-up: 1969–70, 1992–93, 2023–24
  - Promoted: 1961–62, 2002–03
- Conference Premier / National League (level 5)
  - Champions: 2022–23
  - Runners-up: 2011–12, 2021–22
- The Combination
  - Champions: 1900–01, 1901–02, 1902–03, 1904–05
  - Runners-up: 1899–1900
- Welsh Senior League
  - Champions: 1894–95, 1895–96

Cup

- Football League Trophy
  - Winners: 2004–05
- FA Trophy
  - Winners: 2012–13
  - Runners-up: 2014–15, 2021–22
- Football League Cup (North)
  - Winners: 1943–44
- Welsh Cup
  - Winners (23): 1877–78, 1882–83, 1892–93, 1896–97, 1902–03, 1904–05, 1908–09, 1909–10, 1910–11, 1913–14, 1914–15, 1920–21, 1923–24, 1924–25, 1930–31, 1956–57, 1957–58, 1959–60, 1971–72, 1974–75, 1977–78, 1985–86, 1994–95 (Record)
  - Runners-up (22): 1878–79, 1889–90, 1890–91, 1894–95, 1985–96, 1897–98, 1898–99, 1901–02, 1919–20, 1931–32, 1932–33, 1949–50, 1961–62, 1964–65, 1966–67, 1970–71, 1978–79, 1982–83, 1983–84, 1987–88, 1989–90, 1990–91
- FAW Premier Cup
  - Winners (5): 1997–98, 1999–2000, 2000–01, 2002–03, 2003–04 (Record)
  - Runners-up: 1998–99, 2004–05, 2005–06
- Supporters Direct Cup
  - Winners: 2015–16 (Shared)
  - Runners-up: 2011–12, 2014–15
- Debenhams Cup
  - Runners-up: 1977–78

== Player records ==
- Most goals in a season in all competitions: Tommy Bamford – 51 (1933–34)
- Most League goals in a season: Tommy Bamford – 44 (1933–34, Third Division North)
- Most league goals in total: Tommy Bamford – 175
- Most hat tricks: Tommy Bamford – 16
- Most goals scored in a single game by one player: Andy Morrell – 7 (against Merthyr Tydfil, 16 February 2000)
- Most league appearances: 592 – Arfon Griffiths (1959–61, 1962–79)
- Most capped player: 89 – Dennis Lawrence, Trinidad & Tobago
- Most caps while at Wrexham: 49 – Dennis Lawrence, Trinidad & Tobago
- Oldest player: Bobby Roberts – 43 years, 88 days (against Worcester City, 29 October 1983)
- Youngest player: Ken Roberts – 15 years, 158 days (against Bradford PA, 1 September 1951)

== Team records ==
- Attendance – 42,402 v Liverpool F.C., Yankee Stadium, 30 July 2026
- League attendance – 29,261 v Chester City, Division Three, 26 December 1936
- Average attendance – 11,651, 1977–78
- Highest league win – 10–1 v Hartlepools United, 3 March 1962 (Note: Notable for the first occasion of three hat tricks in a single Football League game.)
- Worst league defeat – 9–0 v Brentford, Division Three, 15 October 1963
- Biggest cup win – 6–0 v Charlton Athletic, FA Cup 3rd round, 5 January 1980
- Most games won in a row – 10, 5 April 2003 – 8 May 2003, 2002–03
- Most league wins in a season – 34, 2022–23
- Most goals in a season – 115, 2022–23
- Longest unbeaten run – 28, October 2022 – 7 April 2023, 2022–23
- Most consecutive league clean sheets – 7, 9 October – 26 November, 2011–12
- Most clean sheets in a season – 26, 1973–74 and 2018–19
- Highest transfer received – £800,000 for Bryan Hughes, Birmingham City, 1997
- Highest transfer fee paid – £10,000,000 for Nathan Broadhead, Ipswich Town F.C., Summer 2025 (Note: Rich Fay from Sports Illustrated reported that Nathan transfer base value is £7,500,000 and Anthony Patterson transfer in summer 2026 broke the record with £8,000,000. But he also write that Nathan transfer fee could rise to a higher figure than Patterson’s total package.)

== Annual awards ==
=== League awards ===
==== PFA Team of the Year ====
The following Wrexham players have been included in the PFA Team of the Year

Season	Division	Player(s)
1974–75	Third Division	(Wales) Arfon Griffiths
1976–77	Third Division	(Wales) Arfon Griffiths, (England) Billy Ashcroft
1977–78	Third Division	(Wales) Dai Davies, (Wales) Mickey Thomas, (England) Bobby Shinton, (England) Dixie McNeil
1988–89	Fourth Division	(Wales) Joey Jones, (England) Kevin Russell
1991–92	Fourth Division	(Republic of Ireland) Phil Hardy
1992–93	Division Three	(Wales) Gareth Owen
1994–95	Division Two	(England) Gary Bennett
1995–96	Division Two	(England) Karl Connolly, (England) Bryan Hughes
2002–03	Division Three	(Trinidad and Tobago) Carlos Edwards, (England) Andy Morrell
2003–04	Division Two	(Trinidad and Tobago) Carlos Edwards
2005–06	League Two	(Wales) Mark Jones
2023–24	League Two	(England) Elliot Lee, (England) Paul Mullin

==== EFL Team of the Year ====
The following players have been included in the English Football League Team of the Year at the EFL Awards whilst playing for Wrexham:

Season	Division	Player(s)
2023–24	League Two	(Nigeria) Arthur Okonkwo, (England) Elliot Lee
2024–25	League One	(England) Max Cleworth, (England) Ryan Barnett
2025–26	Championship	(England) Callum Doyle

==== National League Team of the Year ====
The following players have been included in the Conference Premier or National League Team of the Year whilst playing for Wrexham:

Season	Division	Player(s)
2011–12	Conference Premier	(England) Mark Creighton, (England) Nathaniel Knight-Percival, (Wales) Lee Fowler
2012–13	Conference Premier	(England) Jay Harris, (England) Dean Keates
2017–18	National League	(England) Shaun Pearson, (England) Manny Smith
2018–19	National League	(England) Shaun Pearson
2021–22	National League	(England) Aaron Hayden, (Wales) Jordan Davies, (England) Paul Mullin
2022–23	National League	(England) Ben Tozer, (England) Elliot Lee, (England) Paul Mullin

=== Wrexham Player of the Year ===
The following players have been named Wrexham A.F.C. Player of the Year.

- 1975–76 (Wales) Brian Lloyd
- 1976–77 (England) Graham Whittle
- 1977–78 (Wales) Gareth Davies
- 1978–79 (Wales) John Roberts
- 1979–80 (England) Dixie McNeil
- 1980–81 (England) Steve Fox
- 1981–82 (Wales) Eddie Niedzwiecki
- 1982–83 (England) Robbie Savage
- 1983–84 (England) David Gregory
- 1984–85 (Scotland) Jack Keay
- 1985–86 (Wales) Mike Williams
- 1986–87 (Wales) Mike Williams
- 1987–88 (England) Kevin Russell
- 1988–89 (England) Kevin Russell
- 1989–90 (England) Nigel Beaumont
- 1990–91 (England) Mark Morris
- 1991–92 (England) Andy Thackeray
- 1992–93 (England) Tony Humes
- 1993–94 (England) Gary Bennett
- 1994–95 (England) Gary Bennett
- 1995–96 (Wales) Waynne Phillips
- 1996–97 (Wales) Andy Marriott
- 1997–98 (Republic of Ireland) Brian Carey
- 1998–99 (England) Dean Spink
- 1999–2000 (Scotland) Darren Ferguson
- 2000–01 (England) Mark McGregor
- 2001–02 (Northern Ireland) Jim Whitley
- 2002–03 (England) Andy Morrell
- 2003–04 (Trinidad and Tobago) Dennis Lawrence
- 2004–05 (England) Andy Holt
- 2005–06 (Wales) Danny Williams
- 2006–07 (Wales) Steve Evans
- 2007–08 (Wales) Neil Roberts
- 2008–09 (Wales) Marc Williams
- 2009–10 (England) Andy Fleming
- 2010–11 (England) Jay Harris
- 2011–12 (England) Neil Ashton
- 2012–13 (England) Danny Wright
- 2013–14 (England) Mark Carrington
- 2014–15 (England) Manny Smith
- 2015–16 (England) Connor Jennings
- 2016–17 (England) Martin Riley
- 2017–18 (England) Shaun Pearson
- 2018–19 (England) Rob Lainton
- 2019–20 (England) Luke Young
- 2020–21 (England) Luke Young
- 2021–22 (England) Paul Mullin
- 2022–23 (England) Paul Mullin
- 2023–24 (England) Paul Mullin
- 2024–25 (England) Oliver Rathbone
- 2025–26 (England) Josh Windass

=== Young Player of the Year ===
The following players have been named Wrexham A.F.C. Young Player of the Year.

- 1983–84 (England) Shaun Cunnington
- 1984–85 (Wales) Andy Edwards
- 1985–86 (England) Shaun Cunnington
- 1986–87 (England) Roger Preece
- 1987–88 (England) Darren Wright
- 1988–89 (England) Darren Wright
- 1989–90 (Wales) Gareth Owen
- 1990–91 (Wales) Gareth Owen
- 1991–92 (Republic of Ireland) Phil Hardy
- 1992–93 (England) Jonathan Cross
- 1993–94 (England) Dave Brammer
- 1994–95 (England) Bryan Hughes
- 1995–96 (England) Mark McGregor
- 1996–97 (England) Mark McGregor
- 1997–98 (Wales) Neil Roberts
- 1998–99 (England) Robin Gibson
- 1999–2000 (England) Robin Gibson
- 2000–01 (England) Lee Roche
- 2001–02 (Wales) Shaun Pejic
- 2002–03 (Wales) Craig Morgan
- 2003–04 (Wales) Craig Morgan
- 2004–05 (Wales) Mark Jones
- 2005–06 (Wales) Mark Jones
- 2006–07 (England) Matt Done
- 2007–08 (Wales) Neil Taylor
- 2008–09 (Wales) Marc Williams
- 2009–10 (Wales) Chris Maxwell
- 2010–11 (Wales) Chris Maxwell
- 2011–12 (Guinea) Mathias Pogba
- 2012–13 (England) Nicky Rushton
- 2013–14 (England) Andy Coughlin
- 2014–15 (Wales) Rob Evans
- 2015–16 (Wales) Rob Evans
- 2016–17 (Wales) Leo Smith
- 2017–18 N/A
- 2018–19 N/A
- 2019–20 N/A
- 2020–21 (Wales) Jordan Davies
- 2021–22 (England) Max Cleworth
- 2022–23 (England) Sam Dalby
- 2023–24 (England) Max Cleworth
- 2024–25 (England) Max Cleworth
- 2025–26 (England) Callum Doyle

=== Steve Edwards Goal of the Season award ===
The following players have won the Steve Edwards Goal of the Season award.

- 2012–13 (England) Jay Harris v Barrow
- 2013–14 (England) Andy Morrell v Forest Green Rovers
- 2014–15 (England) Mark Carrington v Stoke City
- 2015–16 (England) Dominic Vose v Gateshead
- 2016–17 (England) Ntumba Massanka v Guiseley
- 2017–18 (England) Chris Holroyd v Tranmere Rovers
- 2018–19 (England) Luke Young v Dagenham & Redbridge
- 2019–20 (England) Luke Young v Bromley
- 2020–21 (Wales) Jordan Davies v FC Halifax Town
- 2021–22 (England) Paul Mullin v Stockport County
- 2022–23 N/A
- 2023–24 (England) Ryan Barnett v Forest Green Rovers
- 2024–25 (England) Paul Mullin v Blackpool
- 2025–26 (England) Oliver Rathbone v Queens Park Rangers

=== Top scorers ===
Goal counts are formatted with the league total first, and the total for all competitions in parentheses.

- 1946–47 (England) Jack Boothway 17 (25)
- 1947–48 (England) Billy Tunnicliffe 19 (23)
- 1948–49 (England) Jack Boothway 16 (17)
- 1949–50 (England) Billy Tunnicliffe 7 (13)
- 1950–51 (England) Frank Fidler 13 (15)
- 1951–52 (England) Billy Tunnicliffe 13 (16)
- 1952–53 (Scotland) Tommy Bannan 17 (21)
- 1953–54 (Scotland) Tommy Bannan 14 (18)
- 1954–55 (Scotland) Tommy Bannan 16 (19)
- 1955–56 (Wales) Elfed Evans 13 (16)
- 1956–57 (Wales) Ron Hewitt 22 (28)
- 1957–58 (England) Barry Smith 10 (15)
- 1958–59 (Scotland) Tommy Bannan 15 (17)
- 1959–60 (England) Don Weston 13 (16)
- 1960–61 (England) Mike Metcalf 16 (22)
- 1961–62 (England) Mike Metcalf 17 (20)
- 1962–63 (England) Ron Barnes 12 (15)
- 1963–64 (England) Ernie Phythian 20 (21)
- 1964–65 (England) Martyn King 13 (18)
- 1965–66 (Wales) Keith Webber 16 (18)
- 1966–67 (Northern Ireland) Sammy McMillan 18 (21)
- 1967–68 (England) Ray Smith 18 (19)
- 1968–69 (England) Ray Smith 15 (19)
- 1969–70 (England) Albert Kinsey 26 (28)
- 1970–71 (England) Albert Kinsey 16 (17)
- 1971–72 (England) Albert Kinsey 8 (13)
- 1972–73 (England) Billy Ashcroft 14 (15)
- 1973–74 (Wales) David Smallman 10 (16)
- 1974–75 (Wales) David Smallman 17 (20)
- 1975–76 (England) Billy Ashcroft 14 (19)
- 1976–77 (England) Graham Whittle 28 (35)
- 1977–78 (England) Dixie McNeil 13 (25)
- 1978–79 (Wales) John Lyons 10 (15)
- 1979–80 (England) Dixie McNeil 14 (21)
- 1980–81 (England) Dixie McNeil 13 (20)
- 1981–82 (Wales) Ian Edwards 11 (15)
- 1982–83 (England) Steve Buxton & (England) Robbie Savage 10 (13)
- 1983–84 (England) David Gregory 19 (24)
- 1984–85 (Scotland) Jim Steel 14 (15)
- 1985–86 (England) Steve Charles 21 (24)
- 1986–87 (Scotland) Jim Steel 17 (22)
- 1987–88 (England) Kevin Russell 21 (25)
- 1988–89 (England) Kevin Russell 22 (27)
- 1989–90 (England) Gary Worthington 12 (16)
- 1990–91 (England) Chris Armstrong 10 (15)
- 1991–92 (Wales) Steve Watkin 13 (19)
- 1992–93 (England) Gary Bennett 16 (23)
- 1993–94 (England) Gary Bennett 32 (39)
- 1994–95 (England) Gary Bennett 29 (47)
- 1995–96 (England) Karl Connolly 18 (21)
- 1996–97 (England) Karl Connolly 14 (15)
- 1997–98 (England) Karl Connolly 7 (14)
- 1998–99 (England) Karl Connolly 11 (23)
- 1999–2000 (England) Craig Faulconbridge 9 (11)
- 2000–01 (Scotland) Darren Ferguson 9 (10)
- 2001–02 (England) Craig Faulconbridge 13 (14)
- 2002–03 (England) Andy Morrell 34 (35)
- 2003–04 (Trinidad and Tobago) Hector Sam 10 (12)
- 2004–05 (Spain) Juan Ugarte 17 (23)
- 2005–06 (Wales) Mark Jones 13 (15)
- 2006–07 (Wales) Chris Llewellyn 9 (11)
- 2007–08 (England) Michael Proctor 11 (11)
- 2008–09 (Dominica) Jefferson Louis 15 (15)
- 2009–10 (Wales) Gareth Taylor 8 (8)
- 2010–11 (England) Andy Mangan 15 (15)
- 2011–12 (England) Jake Speight 21 (21)
- 2012–13 (England) Danny Wright 15 (18)
- 2013–14 (England) Johnny Hunt 11 (12)
- 2014–15 (England) Louis Moult 16 (23)
- 2015–16 (England) Connor Jennings 14 (14)
- 2016–17 (England) John Rooney 11 (11)
- 2017–18 (England) Chris Holroyd 13 (13)
- 2018–19 (England) Shaun Pearson 6 (6)
- 2019–20 (England) Bobby Grant 7 (8)
- 2020–21 (England) Luke Young 12 (12)
- 2021–22 (England) Paul Mullin 26 (32)
- 2022–23 (England) Paul Mullin 38 (47)
- 2023–24 (England) Paul Mullin 24 (26)
- 2024–25 (England) Elliot Lee 8 (9)
- 2025–26 (England) Josh Windass 16 (17)

== Hall of fame ==
The following are members of the Wrexham A.F.C. Hall of Fame. Entry is not restricted to players; anyone who has made a great contribution to the club in any capacity can be considered.

- (England) Billy Ashcroft
- (Wales) Tommy Bamford
- (Scotland) Tommy Bannan
- (England) Ken Barnes
- (England) Gary Bennett
- (Wales) Horace Blew
- (Republic of Ireland) Brian Carey
- (Wales) Ron Chaloner
- (Wales) Carroll Clark
- (England) Karl Connolly
- (Wales) Dai Davies
- (Wales) Gareth Davies
- (Trinidad and Tobago) Carlos Edwards
- (Wales) Johnny Edwards
- (Wales) Mickey Evans
- (Wales) Brian Flynn
- (Wales) Alan Fox
- (England) Bert Goode
- (Wales) Arfon Griffiths
- (Wales) Pryce Griffiths
- (Republic of Ireland) Phil Hardy
- (Wales) Ron Hewitt
- (England) Alf Jones
- (Wales) Joey Jones
- (England) Albert Kinsey
- (Trinidad and Tobago) Dennis Lawrence
- (Wales) Brian Lloyd
- (Wales) Cliff Lloyd
- (Wales) Andy Marriott
- (Wales) Tommy Matthias
- (England) Eddie May
- (Scotland) Ally McGowan
- (Northern Ireland) Sammy McMillan
- (England) Dixie McNeil
- (England) John Neal
- (Wales) Gareth Owen
- (Wales) Ted Robinson
- (England) Kevin Russell
- (England) Bobby Shinton
- (England) George Showell
- (England) Denis Smith
- (England) Ray Smith
- (England) Mel Sutton
- (Wales) Mickey Thomas
- (England) Billy Tunnicliffe
- (England) Graham Whittle
- (Wales) Mike Williams
- (England) Andy Morrell
- (England) Mark Carrington
- (Wales) Wrexham Supporters Trust

== International caps ==
The following players earned international caps whilst playing for Wrexham:

Cap counts are formatted with caps earned whilst at Wrexham first, with total career caps in parentheses. Players in bold are still playing for Wrexham.

- (Wales) Edwin Cross **2 (2)**
- (Wales) Alfred Davies **2 (2)**
- (Wales) John Price **12 (12)**
- (Wales) James Davies **1 (1)**
- (Wales) Charles Edwards **1 (1)**
- (Wales) George Glasscodine **1 (1)**
- (Wales) John Davies **1 (1)**
- (Wales) James Lloyd **1 (2)**
- (Wales) Thomas Boden **1 (1)**
- (Wales) Thomas Lewis **2 (2)**
- (Wales) Henry Edwards **5 (8)**
- (Wales) Henry Phoenix **1 (1)**
- (Wales) Robert Davies **3 (3)**
- (Wales) John Eyton-Jones **3 (4)**
- (Wales) Walter Davies **1 (1)**
- (Wales) Tom Burke **4 (8)**
- (Wales) Job Wilding **6 (9)**
- (Wales) Harry Trainer **3 (3)**
- (Wales) Herbert Sisson **3 (3)**
- (Wales) Bill Roberts **2 (4)**
- (Wales) Bob Roberts **2 (2)**
- (Wales) William Turner **1 (1)**
- (Wales) Sam Jones **1 (1)**
- (Wales) Arthur Lea **4 (4)**
- (Wales) Alfred Owen Davies **1 (9)**
- (Wales) Sam Gillam **2 (5)**
- (Wales) Thomas McCarthy **1 (1)**
- (Wales) Abel Hayes **2 (2)**
- (Wales) Harry Pugh **4 (7)**
- (Wales) Joseph Rogers **3 (3)**
- (Wales) John Taylor **1 (1)**
- (Wales) Humphrey Jones **2 (14)**
- (Wales) Oswald Davies **1 (1)**
- (Wales) Dick Turner **2 (2)**
- (Wales) Robert Davies **2 (2)**
- (Wales) Ben Lewis **7 (10)**
- (Wales) Joseph Hudson Turner **1 (1)**
- (Wales) Sam Jones **4 (4)**
- (Wales) William Harrison **5 (5)**
- (Wales) Horace Blew **22 (22)**
- (Wales) Bob Evans **4 (10)**
- (Wales) Fred Kelly **3 (3)**
- (Wales) Llewelyn Griffiths **1 (1)**
- (Wales) Joseph Owens **1 (1)**
- (Wales) William Davies **2 (11)**
- (Wales) John Morgan **1 (1)**
- (Wales) Robert Evans **2 (10)**
- (Wales) Edwin Hughes **6 (16)**
- (Wales) Llewelyn Davies **13 (13)**
- (Wales) Gordon Jones **2 (2)**
- (Wales) George Williams **1 (1)**
- (Wales) Haydn Price **3 (5)**
- (Wales) George Wynn **3 (11)**
- (Wales) Tom Hewitt **3 (8)**
- (Wales) James Roberts **2 (2)**
- (Wales) Tommy Matthias **12 (12)**
- (Wales) George Godding **2 (2)**
- (Wales) Jimmy Jones **1 (1)**
- (Wales) Hywel Davies **1 (1)**
- (Wales) Bert Lumberg **3 (4)**
- (Wales) Billy Mays **1 (1)**
- (Wales) Dick Finnigan **1 (1)**
- (Wales) Tommy Bamford **5 (5)**
- (Wales) Wynne Crompton **3 (3)**
- (Wales) Billy Rogers **2 (2)**
- (Wales) Bert Williams **1 (1)**
- (Wales) George Poland **2 (2)**
- (Wales) Jackie Williams **1 (1)**
- (Wales) David Powell **2 (11)**
- (Wales) Arfon Griffiths **17 (17)**
- (Wales) David Smallman **3 (7)**
- (Wales) Brian Lloyd **3 (3)**
- (Wales) Mickey Thomas **11 (40)**
- (Wales) Dai Davies **25 (40)**
- (Wales) Les Cartwright **1 (7)**
- (Wales) Gareth Davies **3 (3)**
- (Wales) Joey Jones **29 (72)**
- (Wales) Ian Edwards **1 (4)**
- (Northern Ireland) Barry Hunter **6 (15)**
- (Wales) Andy Marriott **5 (5)**
- (Wales) Neil Roberts **1 (4)**
- (Trinidad and Tobago) Carlos Edwards **29 (97)**
- (Trinidad and Tobago) Hector Sam **12 (21)**
- (Trinidad and Tobago) Dennis Lawrence **49 (89)**
- (Northern Ireland) Shaun Holmes **1 (1)**
- (Singapore) Daniel Bennett **5 (125)**
- (Wales) Chris Llewellyn **4 (6)**
- (Wales) Stephen Roberts **1 (1)**
- (Northern Ireland) Michael Ingham **2 (3)**
- (Wales) Steve Evans **7 (7)**
- (Wales) Mark Jones **2 (2)**
- (Trinidad and Tobago) Silvio Spann **8 (41)**
- (Wales) Neil Taylor **1 (40)**
- (Barbados) Louis Moss **2 (7)**
- (Gibraltar) David Artell **4 (7)**
- (Guyana) Keanu Marsh-Brown **3 (16)**
- (Republic of Ireland) James McClean **3 (103)**
- (The Gambia) Jacob Mendy **3 (3)**
- (Wales) **Kieffer Moore** **5 (54)**
- (Burkina Faso) **Issa Kaboré** **4 (52)**
- (Wales) **Nathan Broadhead** **6 (20)**
- (Pakistan) Umar Nawaz **1 (1)**
- (Jamaica) **Bailey Cadamarteri** **4 (8)**
- (Scotland) **Dominic Hyam** **2 (3)**
- (Nigeria) **Arthur Okonkwo** **2 (2)**
- (New Zealand) **Liberato Cacace** **2 (37)**
- (Wales) **Danny Ward** **1 (45)**
- (Gabon) **Jacques Ekomié** **3 (25)**

== European record ==
European Cup Winners' Cup:

Season	Competition	Round	Opponent	Home	Away	Aggregate	Ref
1972–73	Cup Winners' Cup	First round	(Switzerland) FC Zürich	2–1	1–1	3–2	
1972–73	Cup Winners' Cup	Second round	(Socialist Federal Republic of Yugoslavia) Hajduk Split	3–1	0–2	3–3	
1975–76	Cup Winners' Cup	First round	(Sweden) Djurgården	2–1	1–1	3–2	
1975–76	Cup Winners' Cup	Second round	(Poland) Stal Rzeszów	2–0	1–1	3–1	
1975–76	Cup Winners' Cup	Quarter-final	(Belgium) Anderlecht	1–1	0–1	1–2	
1978–79	Cup Winners' Cup	First round	(Socialist Federal Republic of Yugoslavia) Rijeka	2–0	0–3	2–3	
1979–80	Cup Winners' Cup	First round	(East Germany) FC Magdeburg	3–2	2–5	5–7	
1984–85	Cup Winners' Cup	First round	(Portugal) FC Porto	1–0	3–4	4–4	
1984–85	Cup Winners' Cup	Second round	(Italy) Roma	0–1	0–2	0–3	
1986–87	Cup Winners' Cup	First round	(Malta) Żurrieq	4–0	3–0	7–0	
1986–87	Cup Winners' Cup	Second round	(Spain) Real Zaragoza	2–2	0–0	2–2	
1990–91	Cup Winners' Cup	First round	(Denmark) Lyngby	0–0	1–0	1–0	
1990–91	Cup Winners' Cup	Second round	(England) Manchester United	0–2	0–3	0–5	
1995–96	Cup Winners' Cup	Preliminary round	(Romania) Petrolul Ploiești	0–0	0–1	0–1	

== See also ==
- Welcome to Wrexham#Accolades
