= Thomas McCarthy =

Thomas McCarthy (also Tom and Tommy) may refer to:

== Academia ==
- Thomas A. McCarthy (born 1940), American professor of philosophy
- Thomas J. McCarthy (born 1956), American professor of polymer chemistry at the University of Massachusetts
- J. Thomas McCarthy, American law professor

== Arts and entertainment ==
- Thomas McCarthy (poet) (born 1954), Irish poet
- J. Thomas McCarthy (born 1937), American educator, author and attorney
- Tom McCarthy (director) (born 1966), American director, screenwriter and actor
- Tom McCarthy (novelist) (born 1969), English novelist, writer, and artist
- Tom McCarthy (sound editor), American sound editor

== Sports ==
=== Baseball ===
- Tommy McCarthy (baseball) (1863–1922), MLB outfielder
- Tom McCarthy (1900s pitcher) (1884–1933), Major League Baseball (MLB) pitcher, 1908–1909
- Tom McCarthy (1980s pitcher) (born 1961), MLB pitcher, 1985–1989

=== Ice hockey ===
- Tommy McCarthy (ice hockey) (1893–1959), NHL player for the Quebec Bulldogs and Hamilton Tigers
- Tom McCarthy (ice hockey, born 1934) (1934–1992), NHL player for the Red Wings and Bruins
- Tom McCarthy (ice hockey, born 1960) (1960–2022), NHL player for the North Stars and Bruins

=== Other sports ===
- Thomas McCarthy (footballer) (1868–?), Welsh footballer
- Thomas R. McCarthy (1933–2016), American Thoroughbred racehorse owner & trainer
- Tommy McCarthy (hurler) (1906–1968), Irish hurler
- Tom McCarthy (sportscaster) (born 1968), sports broadcaster
- Tommy McCarthy (boxer) (born 1990), Irish boxer
- Tom McCarthy (footballer) (born 2000), Australian rules footballer

== Others ==
- Thomas McCarthy (Syracuse politician) (1786–1848), businessman and political figure from Syracuse, New York
- Thomas McCarthy (Canadian politician) (1832–1870), Quebec businessman and political figure
- Tom McCarthy (trade unionist) (died 1899), British Irish trade union leader
- Thomas Ignatius McCarthy (1880–1951), architect based in Coalville, Leicestershire
- Thomas Joseph McCarthy (1905–1986), Canadian Roman Catholic clergyman and bishop

== See also ==
- Thomas Macarthy, New Zealand brewer and benefactor
