= Tommy Matthias =

Welsh footballer

Personal information
- Full name: Thomas James Matthias
- Date of birth: 7 November 1890
- Place of birth: Brynteg, Nr Wrexham, Wales
- Date of death: 1965 (aged 74-75)
- Place of death: Towradgi, New South Wales, Australia
- Height: 5 ft 6 3/4 in (1.70 m)
- Position: Defender

Senior career*
Years	Team	Apps	(Gls)
- Pentre Broughton
- Mold
- Saltney
1910–1911	Shrewsbury Town		
1911–1912	Chester City	26	(2)
1912–1928	Wrexham	390	(28)
1929	Whitchurch		
1930	Oak Alyn		

International career
1914–1923	Wales	12	(0)
- * Club domestic league appearances and goals

Thomas James Matthias (born 7 November 1890-died 1965) was a Welsh international footballer who played the majority of his career for his hometown club, Wrexham AFC.

Tommy made his debut for Wrexham in the Birmingham & District League on 7 September 1912 against Wolverhampton Wanderers Reserves. Before joining Wrexham, Tommy played for clubs in the local area. He signed for Shrewsbury Town in 1910 and for Chester City a year later, before joining Wrexham. During his early career he also worked as a coal miner and kept fit by using a skipping rope while underground.

Over the next 16 seasons, Tommy played 390 league and cup games for Wrexham. His time at the club was interrupted by wartime service during the First World War. He rejoined Wrexham when competitive football restarted after the war. He played in the club's inaugural Football League match in Division 3 North against Hartlepools United on 27 August 1921. He won four Welsh Cup Winners Medals and was a losing finalist once.

Tommy made 12 appearances for the Wales national football team between 1914 and 1923. He made his international debut on 28 February 1914 against Scotland and played his last match on 17 March 1923, also against Scotland. In the 1919-1920 season, Tommy played in all three games for Wales in the British Home Championship, which Wales won. It was only the second time Wales had won the Championship, and included their first ever victory over England since the Championships began in 1884.

During his Wales career, Tommy played alongside Manchester United and Manchester City star, Billy Meredith, and FA Cup-winning Cardiff City Captain, Fred Keenor. Tommy also played all three games in the 1920-21 British Home Championship, when Wales finished as runners up.

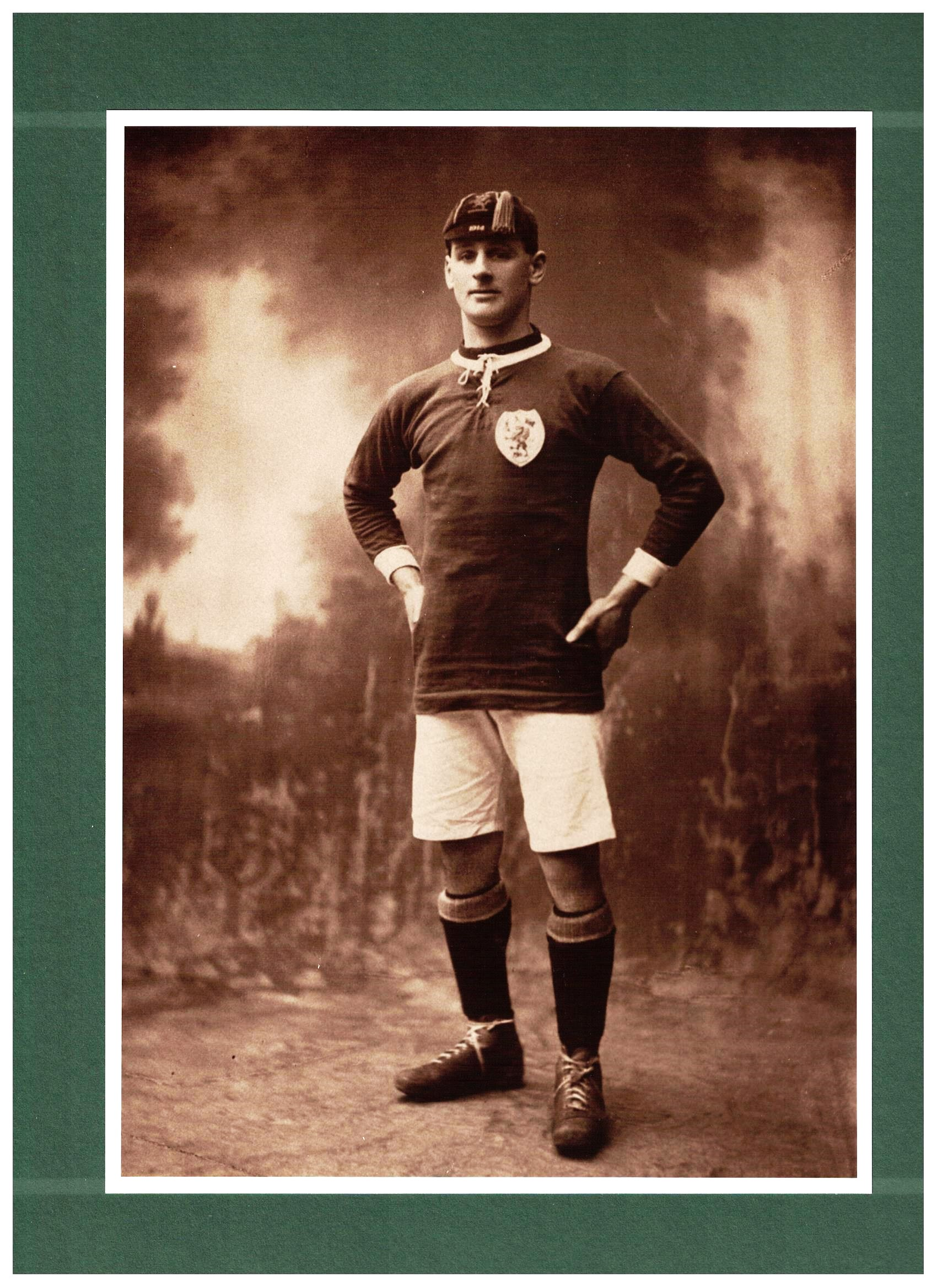
Tommy Matthias photographed in his Wales shirt and international cap. Photo taken c. 1922.

After leaving Wrexham, he played briefly for two amateur clubs. After his playing career ended he worked as a pub landlord and later as an office caretaker as well as working as a scout for Wrexham. In 1964, at the age of 73, he emigrated to Australia where he died in 1965.

== Honours ==
British Home Championship – 1919-20

Welsh Cup Winner – 1914, 1915, 1921, 1925

Welsh Cup Runner Up – 1920

Inducted into Wrexham AFC Hall of Fame

== See also ==
- List of Wales international footballers (alphabetical)
