= Oswald Davies =

Welsh footballer

Personal information
- Date of birth: 10 August 1865
- Place of birth: Llanfyllin, Wales
- Date of death: 23 May 1917 (aged 51)
- Place of death: Barmouth, Wales
- Position: Forward

Youth career
- -1889: Llangollen

Senior career*
| Years | Team | Apps | (Gls) |
| 1889–1892 | Wrexham | 9 | (1) |

International career
| 1890 | Wales | 1 | (0) |
- * Club domestic league appearances and goals

Oswald Davies was a Welsh international footballer. He was part of the Wales national football team, playing 1 match on 22 March 1890 against Scotland.

At club level, he played for Wrexham from 1889 to 1892.

== See also ==
- List of Wales international footballers (alphabetical)
