= Abel Hayes =

Welsh footballer (1865–1941)

Personal information
- Date of birth: 21 December 1865
- Place of birth: Wrexham, Wales
- Date of death: 20 July 1941 (aged 75)
- Place of death: Wrexham, Wales
- Position: Half-back

Youth career
- 1883–1884: Wrexham Crown

Senior career*
Years	Team	Apps	(Gls)
1884–1895	Wrexham		
1895–1896	Rhostyllen Victoria		
1897–	Bootle FC		

International career
1890–1894	Wales	2	(0)
- * Club domestic league appearances and goals

Abel Hayes (21 December 1865 – 20 July 1941) was a Welsh footballer who played as a half-back.

He was a member of the Wrexham squad from 1884 to 1895.

Between 1890 and 1894, he played for the Wales national team, earning two caps. His debut match was on 8 February 1890 against Ireland, and his final match took place on 24 February 1894, also against Ireland.

== See also ==
- List of Wales international footballers (alphabetical)
