= David Smallman =

Welsh footballer

Personal information
- Date of birth: 22 March 1953 (age 73)
- Place of birth: Connah's Quay, Wales
- Position: Forward

Senior career*
Years	Team	Apps	(Gls)
1972–1975	Wrexham	104	(38)
1975–1979	Everton	21	(6)
1980	Oswestry Town		
1981	Wrexham	0	(0)
1981–1982	Bangor City	4	(4)
1982–1985	Green Gully	76	(28)
1986	Colwyn Bay		
1986–1987	Western Suburbs	36	(13)

International career
1974–1975	Wales	7	(1)

Managerial career
- 2015: Coedpoeth United
- * Club domestic league appearances and goals

David Smallman (born 22 March 1953) is a Welsh former international footballer, who also played for Wrexham and Everton.
