= Thomas Lewis (footballer) =

Welsh footballer

Personal information
- Place of birth: Wales
- Position: Half-back

Senior career*
Years	Team	Apps	(Gls)
1880–1881	Wrexham		

International career
1881	Wales	2	(0)
- * Club domestic league appearances and goals

Thomas Lewis was a Welsh international footballer. He was part of the Wales national football team, playing 2 matches. He played his first match on 26 February 1881 against England and his last match on 14 March 1881 against Scotland.

At club level, he played for Wrexham from 1880 to 1881.

== See also ==
- List of Wales international footballers (alphabetical)
