= Dick Turner (footballer) =

Welsh footballer

Personal information
- Date of birth: 1866
- Place of birth: Wales

Senior career*
Years	Team	Apps	(Gls)
- Wrexham

International career
1891	Wales	2	(0)
- * Club domestic league appearances and goals

Dick Turner (born 1866) was a Welsh international footballer. He was part of the Wales national football team, playing 2 matches. He played his first match on 7 February 1891 against Ireland and his last match on 7 March 1891 against England. At club level, he played for Wrexham.

== See also ==
- List of Wales international footballers (alphabetical)
