= Mickey Evans (footballer, born 1947) =

Welsh footballer

Personal information
- Full name: Michael Graham Evans
- Date of birth: 4 June 1947 (age 79)
- Place of birth: Llanidloes, Wales
- Position: Defender

Youth career
- 1963–1964: Wolverhampton Wanderers

Senior career*
Years	Team	Apps	(Gls)
1964–1966	Wolverhampton Wanderers	0	(0)
1966–1979	Wrexham	383	(19)

Managerial career
- 1983–2007: Caersws
- 2009–2014: Caersws
- * Club domestic league appearances and goals

Michael Graham Evans (born 4 June 1947) is a Welsh former footballer who had a long playing career in the English Football League with Wrexham.

== Career ==
Evans was born in Llanidloes and joined Wolverhampton Wanderers as a 15-year-old apprentice in 1963, signing professional forms on his 17th birthday under Stan Cullis. However, he never managed to break through into Wolves' first team and left for Wrexham in 1966.

His Wrexham career lasted 13 seasons. He made some 500 first-team appearances, appeared in five Welsh Cup Finals, including one as captain, and won two promotions, which took the club to the second tier in the late 1970s for the first time in their history. He also played for Wrexham in the Cup Winners' Cup in 1976; they reached the quarter-final before losing by the odd goal to Anderlecht. He also represented Wales at Schoolboy, Youth and Under-23 levels before his playing career was ended by a back injury sustained during a match at Fulham in 1978–79.

He joined Caersws in 1983, initially as player-manager. He served as manager for 24 seasons, taking the club to three Welsh League Cup triumphs and, in 2002, a place in the InterToto Cup. He resigned in June 2007, continuing to work for an oil company while scouting for former club Wrexham, but returned to the post two years later.
