= Thomas McCarthy (footballer) =

Welsh footballer (1868–?)

Personal information
- Full name: Thomas Patrick McCarthy
- Date of birth: 1868
- Place of birth: Wales

Senior career*
Years	Team	Apps	(Gls)
1888–1889	Wrexham		

International career
1889	Wales	1	(0)
- * Club domestic league appearances and goals

Thomas Patrick McCarthy (1868–?) was a Welsh footballer. He was part of the Wales national team, playing one match on 27 April 1889 against Ireland.

At club level, he played for Wrexham in the 1880s.

== See also ==
- List of Wales international footballers (alphabetical)
