= Ally McGowan =

Scottish footballer

Personal information
- Full name: Aloysius McGowan
- Date of birth: 22 January 1930
- Place of birth: Airdrie, North Lanarkshire, Scotland
- Date of death: 5 July 2005 (aged 75)
- Place of death: Wrexham, Wales
- Position: Defender

Senior career*
Years	Team	Apps	(Gls)
- Fauldhouse United
1950–1953	St Johnstone	52	(0)
1953–1963	Wrexham	408	(2)
- Bethesda Athletic

International career
1952	Scotland B	1	(0)
- * Club domestic league appearances and goals

Aloysius "Ally" McGowan (22 January 1930 – 5 July 2005) was a Scottish former footballer, who played as a defender.

== Career ==
After playing for his village's youth team, McGowan was signed to Fauldhouse United. He played there for two years before being approached by the manager of Scottish Division Two side St Johnstone to play for the team.

Whilst at St Johnstone, McGowan would play for Scotland B.

In 1953, new St Johnstone manager Johnny Pattillo wanted to reduce the number of players in the squad, so let McGowan leave to Welsh club Wrexham on a free transfer.

Whilst there, he got over 400 league appearances for Wrexham, and has the 4th most appearances by any player for Wrexham.

McGowan retired in 1963 due to ongoing problems from an ankle injury at the age of 33, after a brief spell at Bethesda Athletic. After retirement, McGowan served as the Wrexham groundsman for between seven and eight years.

== Personal life and death ==
McGowan was the brother of former Partick Thistle left-back Jimmy McGowan.

McGowan died on 5 July 2005 in Wrexham.
