= Ray Smith (footballer, born 1943) =

English footballer

Personal information
- Full name: Raymond James Smith
- Date of birth: 18 April 1943
- Place of birth: Islington, England
- Position: Centre forward

Youth career
- –: Basildon Minors

Senior career*
Years	Team	Apps	(Gls)
1961–1967	Southend United	150	(55)
1967–1972	Wrexham	175	(60)
1972–1973	Peterborough United	22	(8)
1973–19??	Bangor City		
- * Club domestic league appearances and goals

Raymond James "Ray" Smith (born 18 April 1943) is an English former footballer who played as a centre forward. He scored 123 goals from 347 appearances in the Football League playing for Southend United – for whom he top-scored in the 1966–67 season – Wrexham and Peterborough United. He also played for Bangor City.
