= Alfred Jones (footballer, born 1900) =

English footballer

Personal information
- Date of birth: 10 January 1900
- Place of birth: Chester, England
- Date of death: 1959 (aged 58–59)
- Height: 5 ft 7 in (1.70 m)
- Position: Defender

Senior career*
Years	Team	Apps	(Gls)
1923–1935	Wrexham	503	(5)
- * Club domestic league appearances and goals

Alfred Jones (1900–1959) was a footballer who played in The Football League for Wrexham, where he spent twelve years.

He was a cousin of Dixie Dean.
