= Robin Gibson (footballer) =

English footballer

Personal information
- Full name: Robin John Gibson
- Date of birth: 15 November 1979 (age 46)
- Place of birth: Crewe, England
- Position: Midfielder

Youth career
- 1994–1998: Crewe Alexandra

Senior career*
Years	Team	Apps	(Gls)
1998–2002	Wrexham	77	(3)
2002–2007	Stafford Rangers		
2007–2008	Droylsden		
2008	Nantwich Town		
2008–2009	Leigh RMI		
2009–2010	Nantwich Town		
- * Club domestic league appearances and goals

Robin John Gibson (born 15 November 1979) is an English footballer who played as a midfielder in the Football League for Wrexham.

== Playing career ==
=== Crewe Alexandra & Wrexham ===
Gibson was a trainee for Crewe Alexandra at the age of 15. After that he joined Wrexham in 1998 and made 77 league appearances. He is most remembered for his major goal against Middlesbrough in the FA Cup; knocking them out. On 17 April 2002, Gibson was released with seven other players due to financial cut-backs.

=== Stafford Rangers ===
He later joined Stafford Rangers and went on to make over 100 appearances and has won the Staffs Senior Cup medal twice. He also scored a penalty for Stafford in the play-off semi-final against Harrogate Town in a game which led to their promotion to the conference at the expense of his current club Droylseden in the final.

=== Droylsden and non-league ===
He left Stafford in the summer of 2007 and signed for newly promoted Droylsden who won the Conference North in the 2006–07 season. Gibson then had a short spell at Nantwich Town where he failed to impress and was later signed by Leigh RMI. After spending a few months at Leigh RMI he was released. Later Robin "Gibbo" Gibson signed for Nantwich Town.
