= Tommy Bannan =

Scottish footballer

Personal information
- Full name: Thomas Neilson Bannan
- Date of birth: 13 April 1930
- Place of birth: Darngavel, Airdrie, Scotland
- Date of death: 4 May 2004 (aged 74)
- Place of death: Coatbridge, Scotland
- Height: 5 ft 7 in (1.70 m)
- Positions: Centre forward; inside right

Youth career
- Plains St David's

Senior career*
Years	Team	Apps	(Gls)
1948–1951	Airdrieonians	21	(18)
1949–1950	→ Stenhousemuir	8	(5)
1951–1955	Wrexham	158	(60)
1955–1957	Lincoln City	67	(19)
1957–1959	Wrexham	68	(23)
1959–1961	Barrow	45	(15)
- * Club domestic league appearances and goals

Thomas Neilson Bannan (13 April 1930 – 4 May 2004) was a Scottish professional footballer who scored 23 goals from 29 appearances in the Scottish Football League playing for Airdrieonians and Stenhousemuir, and 117 goals from 338 appearances in the English Football League playing for Wrexham, Lincoln City and Barrow. He played as a centre forward or inside right.

== Career ==
Bannan was born in Darngavel, near Airdrie in Lanarkshire. He played local football around Airdrie before joining the town's Scottish League club, Airdrieonians. Bannan made his debut in the 1948–49 season, and in his three seasons with the club he scored 18 goals from 21 League games, as well as spending a spell on loan to Stenhousemuir. In 1951 he moved south to play in the English Football League, signing for Wrexham of the Third Division North.

Bannan scored on his Wrexham debut, on 18 August 1951 against Chester. He became a regular in the first team, averaging 45 games a season in all competitions, and his goalscoring was such that he was their leading scorer in his second, third and fourth seasons, with 22, 18 and 19 goals respectively.

In 1955, he moved up a division to join Lincoln City. His first season with the club was relatively unsuccessful, but in his second season he finished as their leading scorer with 14 goals in League and FA Cup. He then returned to Wrexham for another two years. In 1958 he scored in every round of the Welsh Cup up to the final, then scored the winner in the replayed final to defeat Chester 2–1. In 1958–59, his last year with the club, he again finished as top scorer, this time with 17 goals.

Bannan finished his professional career with two seasons at Fourth Division club Barrow, who signed him for a fee of £1,500. He retired at the end of the 1960–61 season.

== Personal life ==
Bannan's grandson, Barry, is also as professional footballer, representing Scotland on 27 occasions.

Bannan died on 4 May 2004 aged 74 and was buried with his wife Mary McKay at St Joseph's Cemetery, Rochsoles in Airdrie. In 2005, he was inducted into the Wrexham Supporters Association Hall of Fame.
