= Bertram Goode =

English footballer

Bertram John Goode (11 August 1886 - 30 April 1955) was an English footballer who played inside right.

Goode was born in Chester, England. He was 5 ft 7 1/2 in. tall and weighed 11 stones.

== Career ==
During his career, Goode played for Hoole, Saltney, Chester, Liverpool (from 7 July 1908), and Wrexham (from 22 June 1910), before transferring to Aston Villa for £250 in April 1911. He transferred to Hull City for £300 on 2 May 1912 and also played for Chester, Wrexham and, as a wartime guest, Millwall and Southampton.

He died in Wrexham, Wales
