= Billy Ashcroft =

English footballer

Personal information
- Full name: William Ashcroft
- Date of birth: 1 October 1952 (age 74)
- Place of birth: Liverpool, England
- Positions: Defender; forward

Senior career*
Years	Team	Apps	(Gls)
1970–1977	Wrexham	219	(72)
1977–1982	Middlesbrough	139	(21)
1982–1985	FC Twente	77	(29)
1985–1986	Tranmere Rovers	23	(2)
Total		458	(124)
- * Club domestic league appearances and goals

Billy Ashcroft (born 1 October 1952) is an English retired footballer who played both as a central defender and as a forward.

The red-haired Ashcroft made his League debut for Middlesbrough on 3 September 1977 in a 2–1 defeat at West Bromwich Albion, after having previously served Wrexham for seven years, playing 219 matches and scoring 72 goals. Ashcroft was transferred to FC Twente in the Netherlands in 1982, where he stayed for three years, making 77 league appearances and scoring 29 goals. He was the club top-scorer in the 1983–84 season. In 1985, he moved to Tranmere Rovers, where he scored twice in 23 league appearances.

After retiring he worked as a driving instructor in Southport.
