= Gareth Davies (footballer, born 1949) =

Welsh footballer

Personal information
- Full name: Gareth Davies
- Date of birth: 11 August 1949 (age 77)
- Place of birth: Bangor, Wales
- Position: Central defender

Youth career
- Llandudno
- Colwyn Bay

Senior career*
Years	Team	Apps	(Gls)
1967–1983	Wrexham	490	(9)
- Lex XI

International career
	Wales U23	4	(0)
1978	Wales	3	(0)
- * Club domestic league appearances and goals

Gareth Davies (born 11 August 1949) is a Welsh former footballer who played at both professional and international levels as a central defender.

== Career ==
Born in Bangor, Davies played for Llandudno, Colwyn Bay, Wrexham and Lex XI. While at Wrexham, he was Player of the Season during 1977–78.

Davies also played for Wales at under-23 level, and earned three senior international caps for Wales in 1978.
