= Albert Kinsey =

English footballer

Personal information
- Full name: Albert John Kinsey
- Date of birth: 16 September 1945 (age 81)
- Place of birth: Liverpool, England
- Height: 5 ft 10 in (1.78 m)
- Position: Forward

Senior career*
Years	Team	Apps	(Gls)
1962–1965	Manchester United	0	(0)
1965–1972	Wrexham	253	(84)
1972–1973	Crewe Alexandra	32	(1)
1973–1974	Wigan Athletic	5	(1)
Total		290	(86)
- * Club domestic league appearances and goals

Albert John Kinsey (born 19 September 1945) is an English former footballer. His regular position was as a forward. He was born in Liverpool. He played for Manchester United and Wrexham. Albert Kinsey played a major role in Wrexham's promotion to League Division 3 in season 1969–1970, finishing as leading scorer in the Football League, with 27 goals. Three years later, he became the first player to score a goal in European competition for Wrexham, helping them to draw 1–1 at F.C.Zurich, Wrexham won the home leg 2–1. Wrexham were eventually defeated 3–2 on aggregate to Hadjuk Split in the next round. He later joined Crewe Alexandra before dropping into non-league football with Wigan Athletic, where he scored one goal in five Northern Premier League games in the 1973–74 season.
