= Wrexham A.F.C. =

Association football club in Wrexham, Wales

Wrexham
- Full name: Wrexham Association Football Club
- Nicknames: The Reds; The Red Dragons; The Robins; The Town; Y Dreigiau ('the Dragons')
- Short name: Wrexham AFC; CPD Wrecsam (Welsh)
- Founded: 4 October 1864; 162 years ago
- Stadium: Racecourse Ground
- Capacity: 10,771
- Owner: Wrexham Holdings LLC
- Chairman: Rob McElhenney; Ryan Reynolds
- Manager: Phil Parkinson
- League: EFL Championship
- 2025–26: EFL Championship, 7th of 24
- Website: wrexhamafc.co.uk
Home colours	Away colours

Wrexham Association Football Club (Welsh: Clwb Pêl-droed Wrecsam) is a professional football club based in Wrexham, Wales. Formed in 1864, it is the oldest club in Wales and the third-oldest professional football team in the world. The club competes in the EFL Championship, the second tier of the English football league system.

Domestically, the club has won the Welsh Cup a record twenty-three times, the short-lived FAW Premier Cup a record five times, the Football League Trophy in 2005 and the FA Trophy in 2013. Recently, following five unsuccessful play-off campaigns in the National League, Wrexham achieved three promotions in three seasons, from 2022 to 2025, through winning the 2022–23 National League, finishing runner-up in the 2023–24 EFL League Two and also in the 2024–25 EFL League One. Thus, Wrexham secured a spot in the EFL Championship, and became the first club across the top five tiers of English football to achieve three consecutive promotions.

Internationally, Wrexham competed in the European Cup Winners' Cup, later the UEFA Cup Winners' Cup, on multiple occasions through success in the Welsh Cup, reaching the quarter-finals once in 1976, as well as beating FC Porto and drawing with teams such as Real Zaragoza and Anderlecht during their time in the competition. However, following changes made to the Welsh Cup competition in 1995, Welsh clubs playing in the English Football system (such as Wrexham) were no longer permitted to enter and, therefore, had to qualify for European competition exclusively via the English system. In 2012, UEFA reiterated that Welsh clubs playing in the English football league system could not qualify for European competitions via the Welsh Cup, after Wrexham (alongside Merthyr Town and Newport County) rejoined for one season in 2011–12.

Wrexham received major financial investment after its 2020 takeover by American actor Rob McElhenney and Canadian and American actor Ryan Reynolds through Wrexham Holdings LLC, starting a new era of success. This acquisition, alongside the global publicity of the Welcome to Wrexham documentary series, had a significant impact on the club's visibility, resulting in an unprecedented new international fanbase for a team that were in the fifth division (at the time).

The club's home stadium, the Racecourse Ground, is the world's oldest international stadium that still continues to host international games. The record attendance at the ground was set in 1957 when the club hosted a match against Manchester United in front of 34,445 spectators. The club's main rivalries are with English clubs Chester, Shrewsbury Town, and Tranmere Rovers, with matches against Chester being known as the cross-border derby. In addition, Wrexham have been referred to as cup "giant-killers", due to unexpected successes against top-flight opponents, such as upsetting the reigning league champions Arsenal in the 1992 FA Cup.

== History ==
=== Early years (1863–1921) ===
On 12 October 1863, a group of local businessmen formed a new organisation 'The United Volunteer Services Club' to provide athletic sport for the young men of Wrexham, in order to keep them from spending their spare time in public houses. This organisation provided the ideological basis for the future formation of Wrexham Football Club, which is now the oldest football club 'still in existence today' that was founded according to temperance principles. Evan Morris, Charles Edward Kershaw and Joseph Wilbraham Clark were 3 of the founding members of the United Volunteer Services Club, who were also members of the Denbighshire County Cricket Club; and they used their influence within the cricket club to bring their ideals to fruition.

Wrexham Football Club was formed on 4 October 1864, in The Turf Tavern (named the Turf Hotel by 1872), by members of the cricket club who wanted to provide sporting activity for the young men of the town throughout the winter months. This makes them the fifth oldest association football team, the third oldest professional club and the oldest in Wales. Their first game was played on 22 October 1864 at the Denbighshire County Cricket Ground (later known as the Racecourse Ground), against 10 men of the Prince of Wales Fire Brigade. The 10 founding members who played for Wrexham Football Club in that first ever game were; Charles Edward Kershaw, William Tootell, Thomas Broster, Thomas Hanmer, Edward Ephraim Knibbs, Thomas Heath, Thomas Henry Sykes, John Taylor, George Rumsey Johnston, and Joseph Roberts. The club lost 2–1 to the brigade.

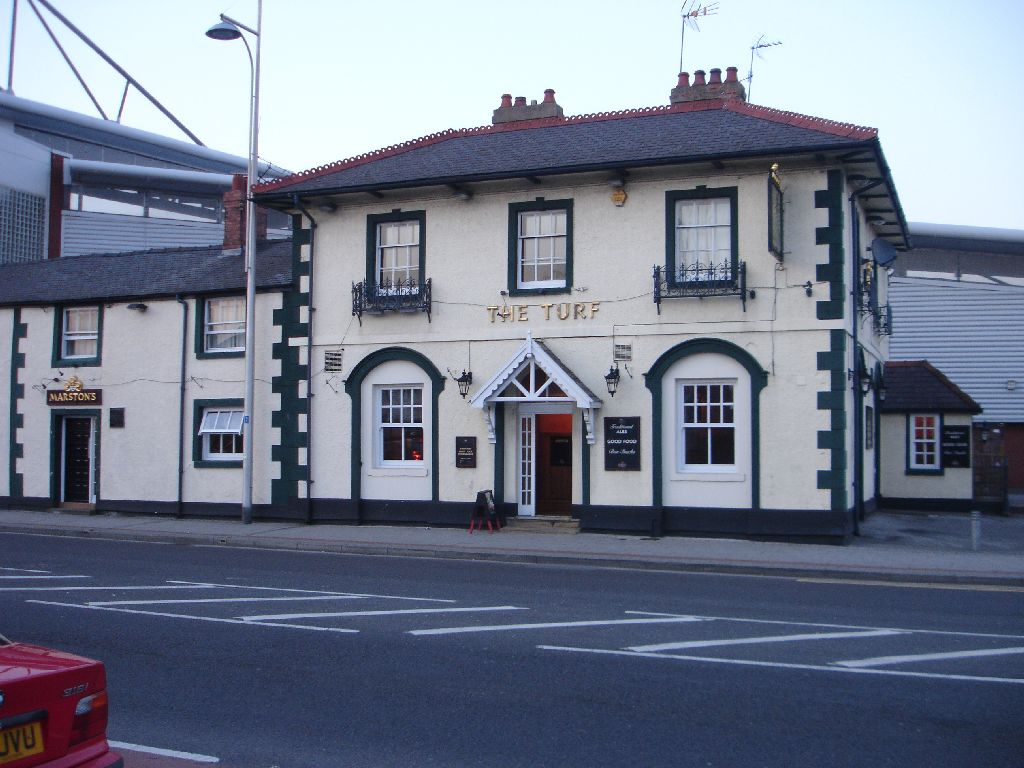
The Turf Hotel, the building in which the club was founded in 1864

In these early years, Wrexham were leaders of the campaign to restrict teams to eleven players on the pitch at any one time (as early matches could feature teams with up to seventeen players on each side). In 1876, the newly formed Football Association of Wales (FAW) organised the Welsh national team's first international match against Scotland, where trials were held at the Racecourse Ground and two Wrexham players, Edwin Cross and Alfred Davies made the squad.

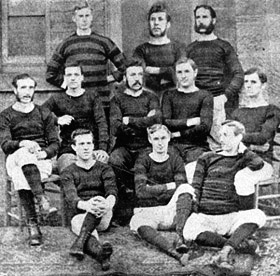
The Wrexham team that won the Welsh Cup in 1878

In the 1877–78 season, the FAW inaugurated the Welsh Cup competition, to run on similar lines to the English FA Cup. Wrexham won the final of the inaugural competition, defeating Druids F.C. 1–0, thanks to James Davies scoring the winning goal. Due to a lack of money at the fledgling FAW, Wrexham did not receive their trophy until the next year. In this decade, Wrexham mostly played in friendly matches against Welsh and English opponents and, as such, the Welsh Cup provided most of their competitive football.

Disputes with the landlords of the Racecourse Ground –– who had raised the rent to £10 a year –– resulted in Wrexham playing their home games at Rhosddu Recreation Ground during the 1881–82 and 1882–83 seasons. The club's name also changed to Wrexham Athletic for one season. However, in the 1883–84 season, the club moved back to the Racecourse Ground and have played their home games there ever since.

In 1883, Wrexham won their second Welsh Cup, and made their first appearance in the FA Cup. In the FA Cup, Wrexham received a bye into the second round of the competition and were defeated 3–4 at home by Oswestry. Misconduct from the Wrexham crowd at the game resulted in the club's expulsion from the Football Association and subsequently, Wrexham were forced to reform in 1884 as Wrexham Olympic (a name eventually dropped in 1888).

In 1890, Wrexham joined The Combination league, playing their first game against Gorton Villa on 6 September 1890, with Arthur Lea scoring Wrexham's only goal in a 5–1 defeat, and Wrexham finished their first season in eighth place. The club played in the Combination for four years before a rapid increase in costs resulted in the club joining the Welsh League in the 1894–95 season. Wrexham won the Welsh League in back-to-back seasons, but decided to return to the Combination in 1896, as despite the reduced support they received, the savings made on their traveling expenses outweighed the reduction in gate revenue. The club remained in the Combination until 1905, by which time they had managed to win the league four times.

In 1905, after several unsuccessful attempts, Wrexham was finally elected to the Birmingham and District League in time for the 1905–06 season. During this debut season, Wrexham won their first league match 2–1 against Kidderminster Harriers at home in front of two thousand spectators, and finished the season sixth. During their time in the Birmingham and District League, Wrexham won the Welsh Cup six times (in 1908–09, 1909–10, 1910–11, 1913–14, 1914–15, and 1920–21). Additionally, Wrexham reached the First Round proper of the FA Cup for a second time, in the 1908–09 season, before losing a replay 1–2 to Exeter City after extra time.

=== Into the Football League (1921–1968) ===
Yearly table positions of Wrexham in the English football league system

In 1921, Wrexham was a founding member of the newly formed Third Division North of the Football League. In this debut season, Wrexham achieved many of the club's Football League "firsts", such as: Ted Regan scoring Wrexham's first league hat-trick; and Brian Simpson becoming the first Wrexham player to be sent off during a league match, against Southport in January 1922. Charlie Hewitt was the club's first-ever manager during this period.

From the 1926–27 season to the 1939–40 season, Wrexham were a consistent presence in the Third Division North. In the 1928–29 season, a record thirty-two league goals from Albert Mays helped Wrexham achieve third place and also, marked the debut of club legend Tommy Bamford. Bamford went on to score 201 goals for the club during his time at the Racecourse Ground. In the following season (1929–30), Wrexham recorded their biggest league win at the time, when they defeated Rochdale 8–0. During the 1932–33 season, Wrexham had their best Third Division North performance, when they finished runners-up to Hull City and won 18 of their 21 home games during the course of the season. In the final season during this period (1939–40), Wrexham appeared in their now-familiar red and white kit colours for the first time. The club's best FA Cup performance prior to the Second World War was in the 1927–28 season, where Wrexham fought their way to the fourth round before they lost 0–1 to Birmingham City.

During the Second World War years, when long cross-county trips were impossible due to the war, Wrexham played in the Regional League West against local teams from Merseyside and Manchester, amongst others in the northwest region. The club's position as a barracks town meant that the team could secure the services of many famous guest players such as Stanley Matthews, Stan Cullis, and others.

In the post-war period, the club made its first-ever tour abroad in 1949, when the team played three matches against the British army in Germany. In the 1956–57 season, Wrexham reached the fourth round of the FA Cup, where they played Manchester United's Busby Babes in front of a crowd of 34,445 people at the Racecourse, which still remains a club record. The 5–0 defeat did not spoil the occasion for the large home crowd, and later that season Wrexham managed to win the Welsh Cup for the first time in 26 years.

Following the 1959–60 season, the club was relegated to a lower tier for the first time in their history and consequently, were dropped into the newly created Football League Fourth Division. However, the appointment of Ken Barnes as player-manager during the 1961–62 season, helped Wrexham achieve promotion back to the Third Division, as well as their greatest league victory to date (i.e. the 10–1 trouncing of Hartlepool United). Two years after this promotion, Wrexham was relegated to the Fourth Division again, and in 1966 they finished rock-bottom at 92nd in the Football League after an extremely disappointing season.

=== FA Cup and European campaigns (1968–1982) ===
John Neal was appointed manager of Wrexham in 1968, succeeding Alvan Williams who had brought Neal to the club as his assistant. He guided the club to a 9th-place finish in 1969, before leading Wrexham to their second Football League promotion in 1970 with a second-place finish and promotion to the Third Division. With Welsh clubs now able to qualify for the European Cup Winners' Cup by winning the Welsh Cup, Wrexham played their inaugural match in Europe against Swiss side FC Zurich in Switzerland on 13 September 1972, the game finishing 1–1. In the return leg, Wrexham won 2–1, advancing to the second round with a 3–2 win on aggregate. The second round drew Wrexham against Yugoslav side Hajduk Split. Over the course of two games, the score finished 3–3 on aggregate with Wrexham matching their more illustrious opponents, but they were knocked out of the competition due to the away goals rule.

The 1972–73 season saw the completion of the new Yale stand, with a capacity of up to 5,500. The terrace contributed to the bottom tier of the stand. The 1973–74 season saw Wrexham change their badge from the Maelor crest to a brand new badge that had much more resemblance to the Welsh roots of the club, with three feathers on the top of the badge and two dragons, one on either side of the badge and facing inwards. This is still the badge for today's team. This season also saw Wrexham reach the quarter-finals of the FA Cup in another cup run. After victories over Shrewsbury Town, Rotherham United, Middlesbrough, Crystal Palace and Southampton, their cup run came to an end with a loss to first division side Burnley at Turf Moor, with 15,000 Wrexham fans at the match. Also that season Wrexham just missed out on the promotion spots, finishing in 4th place at the end of the season.

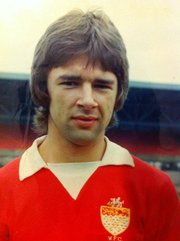
Defender Alan Hill played over 250 games for Wrexham between 1973 and 1983.

1975–76 saw John Neal's team captained by Eddie May, reaching the quarter-finals of the European Cup Winners' Cup. In the first round, Wrexham beat Swedish team Djurgårdens IF 3–2 on aggregate. They then knocked out the Polish side Stal Rzeszow 3–1 on aggregate. Wrexham played Belgian champions Anderlecht in the quarter-finals and lost 2–1 to the eventual winners of the competition. The 1976–77 season saw Wrexham again beat First Division opposition in both Cup competitions as they went on another cup run, defeating Tottenham Hotspur in the Football League Cup and Sunderland in the FA Cup. However, the club missed out on promotion to the Second Division after a late-season poor run of form.

Arfon Griffiths took over as player-manager for the 1977–78 season. They reached both the League and FA Cup quarter-finals that season, and Wrexham won promotion to the Second Division when they beat Rotherham United 7–1 at the Racecourse, in addition to the Third Division Championship that year. In the 1978–79 season Wrexham made it to the fourth round of the FA Cup, where they lost to Tottenham Hotspur 3–2 in the replay after the first game finished 3–3. Following Arfon Griffiths' resignation from the manager's position in 1981, his assistant Mel Sutton was put in charge, with a third-round FA Cup win over Brian Clough's Nottingham Forest in another cup run, the highlight of the season.

=== A steady decline (1982–1991) ===
The summer of 1982 saw Bobby Roberts appointed the club's new manager. Relegation meant the club had dire financial problems, resulting in the sale of many of the club's experienced and talented players. Frank Carrodus, Ian Edwards, Mick Vinter and Wayne Cegieski had already left during the summer, Steve Fox, Joey Jones, Dixie McNeil and Billy Ronson soon followed. Wrexham were again relegated to the Fourth Division after plummeting from apparent mid-table security. The club's slide continued into the following season, and only goal difference prevented Wrexham from being forced to apply for re-election to the League.

The 1984–85 season saw Wrexham take on FC Porto in European competition. Wrexham won the home leg with a 1–0 victory, but in the second leg, Porto showed their class and were 3–0 up after 38 minutes. However, Wrexham pulled goals back and the game finished 4–3, making it 4–4 on aggregate with Wrexham advancing on away goals. The second round draw was to pair Wrexham with Italian side AS Roma, managed by Sven-Göran Eriksson. Wrexham lost 3–0 on aggregate over the two legs. Their league performance was even more dire than the previous year, and by the time Bobby Roberts was finally removed from his post, Wrexham was rock-bottom of the entire Football League.

Former Racecourse favourite Dixie McNeil was appointed caretaker manager, and immediately inspired a revival that saw Wrexham win 7 of their last 10 matches and comfortably finish clear of having to apply for re-election, which earned him the job on a permanent basis that summer. His first season in charge saw the team finish mid-table position in an average season and he led the team to a Welsh Cup final win over Kidderminster Harriers. 1986 saw Wrexham make a return to European football with a first-round draw against Maltese side FC Zurrieq, whom they beat 7–0 on aggregate to earn a second-round tie against Real Zaragoza which they drew 2–2 with on aggregate but they went out on away goals.

Following the Bradford City stadium fire in May 1985, legislation on ground safety at all football grounds was brought into effect. This eventually led to the closure of the Mold Road stand because it did not reach the necessary safety standards. Led by Dixie McNeil, Wrexham reached the Fourth Division play-offs in 1989, having finished seventh in the league. Wrexham beat Scunthorpe United in the semi-final 5–1 on aggregate, but narrowly lost to Leyton Orient 2–1 in the final. After Wrexham started the next season with just 3 wins from 13 league games, Dixie McNeil resigned before his inevitable sacking.

He was replaced, initially on a temporary basis, by Brian Flynn, but his appointment was made permanent a month later. However the club continued to struggle domestically, and Flynn was forced to make three important signings in Mark Sertori, Eddie Youds and Alan Kennedy which saw the team finish in twenty-first place, therefore avoiding relegation. At the start of the 1990–91 season it was announced there would be no relegation to the Conference Premier as a team had already voluntarily left the league. That season Wrexham finished in ninety-second place. Wrexham were knocked out of the European Cup Winners' Cup in the second round by Manchester United 5–0 on aggregate, who eventually went on to win the trophy.

=== Reputation as giant killers (1991–2001) ===
The 1991–92 season saw Wrexham still in a poor financial state, as they continued to struggle on the field. With the club knocked out of the League Cup and struggling in the league, it was left to the FA Cup to keep the season alive. Having beaten Telford United and Winsford United, they were drawn to play the previous season's First Division champions Arsenal. Wrexham produced one of their most memorable nights to beat the Gunners 2–1 after being behind, with a thunderous Mickey Thomas free kick and a Steve Watkin goal. They lost in the next round to West Ham United 1–0 in a replay after the first game had finished 2–2.

In an attempt to change the fortunes of the club after several seasons in the doldrums at the bottom of the football league pyramid, the 1992–93 season saw Wrexham manager Brian Flynn make a shrewd signing when he enlisted the services of Gary Bennett, who soon settled and helped Wrexham into the promotion race. Wrexham's season came to a head on 27 April 1993 when with two games left they travelled to Northampton Town requiring a win to gain promotion to the next tier of English football. The game ended with a 2–0 victory to Wrexham and the 5,500 travelling "Reds" supporters there were jubilant when promotion had finally been achieved. The 1994–95 season would see Wrexham achieve more success in cup competitions, this time going on a run through the FA Cup. Having beaten Stockport County and Rotherham United, they faced Premier League side Ipswich Town at the Racecourse, with Wrexham running out 2–1 winners thanks to goals from Gary Bennett and Kieron Durkan. In the next round, Wrexham was drawn away to Manchester United and despite taking the lead at Old Trafford, United went on to win 5–2.

The 1995–96 season once again saw Wrexham in European action, losing 1–0 on aggregate to Romanian team Petrolul Ploiești. The 1996–97 season saw Wrexham set off on another strong run in the FA Cup and beat more top-flight opposition. Following wins at Colwyn Bay and Scunthorpe United, they were drawn to play West Ham United at home, the game ending in a 1–1 draw on a snow-covered pitch. The replay at Upton Park ended in a shock 1–0 win to Wrexham as Kevin Russell scored in the dying minutes to send Wrexham into the fourth round. After also beating Peterborough United and Birmingham City in the following rounds, they played Chesterfield in an all-Division-2 FA Cup quarter-final, Wrexham narrowly losing to the Spireites 1–0.

June 1997 was the date for the official opening of Colliers Park, which was Wrexham's new training ground and was situated just outside Gresford on Chester Road. It was built at a cost of £750,000 and is widely regarded to be one of the best training grounds outside of the top flight. It has been used for training by many visiting teams that play at a higher standard over the years, such as Barcelona. The 1999–2000 season saw Wrexham again beat a top-flight team in the FA Cup, this time in the shape of Middlesbrough. The final score of the match was 2–1, with the second-half goals coming from Robin Gibson and Darren Ferguson after being behind the Premiership outfit. Wrexham went on to win the FAW Premier Cup in May 2001.

=== Administration and relegation to non-League football (2001–2008) ===
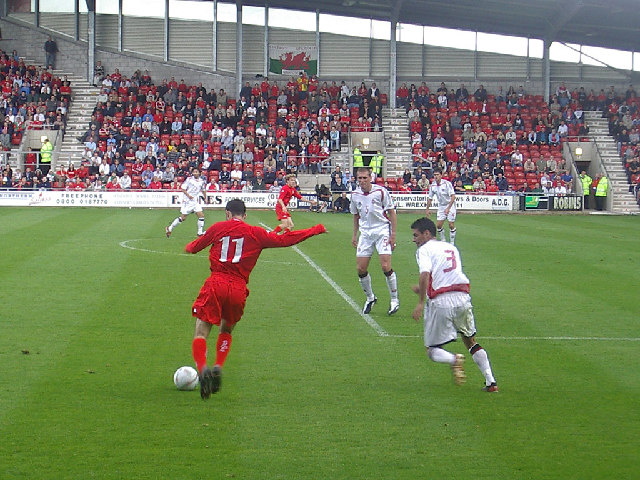
Match at the Racecourse in 2004

At the start of the 21st century, the club had many problems off the pitch, including then chairman Alex Hamilton's attempting to get the club evicted from the stadium so that he could use and sell it for his own development purposes – the saga involved the sale of the Racecourse Ground to a separate company owned by Hamilton immediately after he became the club's chairman. The club was included in FIFA Football 2004 for the first time and remained playable up to FIFA 08. In the summer of 2004, Hamilton gave the club a year's notice to quit the ground.

The club's fans developed an affinity with the fans of fellow football league club Brighton & Hove Albion, who themselves had managed to successfully depose their chairman and keep control of their stadium after he had sold the ground for development purposes in almost the same circumstances. On 3 December 2004 the club was placed in financial administration by the High Court in Manchester as the club owed £2,600,000, including £800,000 which was owed to the Inland Revenue in unpaid taxes. Wrexham became the first League club to suffer a ten-point deduction under the new rule for being placed in administration, dropping them from the middle of the League One table to the relegation zone after the point deduction, which subsequently condemned Wrexham to relegation.

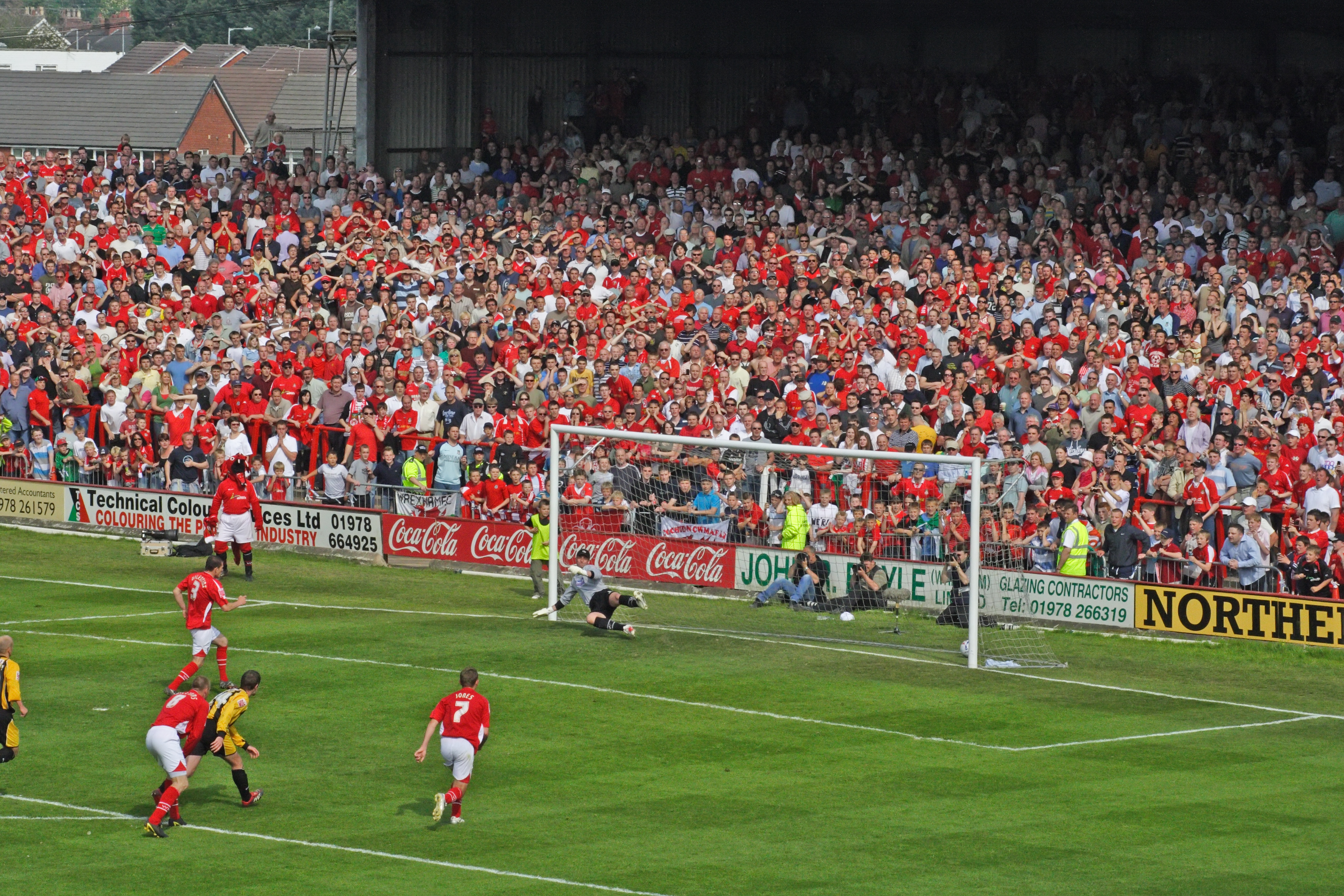
5 May 2007: Ryan Valentine scores the goal against Boston that keeps Wrexham in the Football League

Despite their financial troubles, Wrexham went on to win the 2004–05 Football League Trophy by defeating Southend United 2–0 after extra time, in Wrexham's first appearance at the Millennium Stadium in Cardiff. The winning goals were scored by Juan Ugarte and Darren Ferguson as Wrexham ran out winners in front of nearly 20,000 Wrexham fans. Wrexham still retained an outside chance of escaping the drop in the 2004–05 season following an end-of-season winning streak; however, their faint hopes of staying up were ended with a 2–1 home loss to Brentford on 3 May 2005. The 10-point deduction proved decisive in determining Wrexham's fate, as the club finished with 43 points compared to 20th-placed Milton Keynes Dons' 51 – a net points tally of 53 before deduction, which had condemned them to relegation.

In October 2005, Birmingham High Court decided that Alex Hamilton's company CrucialMove had improperly acquired the freehold of the ground and the decision went against him. Hamilton then took this to the Appeal Court in London and it ruled on 14 March 2006 that the stadium must remain in the hands of the club's administrators. On 30 April 2006 the administrators reached an agreement with local car dealer Neville Dickens, subject to agreement by the shareholders and creditors (which was achieved on 30 May), for Dickens to take over control of the club and all its assets. Had the club still been in administration by 3 June then Wrexham would have automatically been expelled from the League because of their financial situation. Wrexham Football Club (2006) Ltd is the name of the "phoenix" company that took over the assets of the old Wrexham Association Football Club Limited – technically, the club is no longer officially called Wrexham Association Football Club due to the takeover of the club by Neville Dickens and Geoff Moss and their associates; this is reflected on new merchandise, although most fans will still refer to it as "Wrexham AFC".

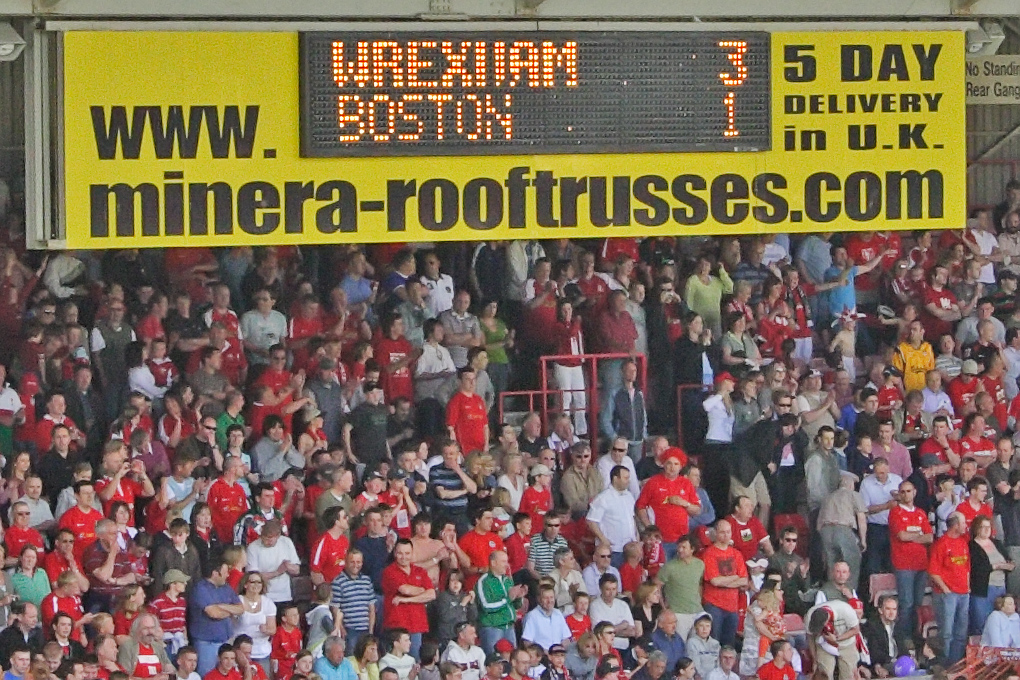
5 May 2007: Scoreboard showing the final score of the game that kept Wrexham in the Football League and condemned Boston United to the Conference

The 2006–07 season started well for Wrexham, as they went 8 games unbeaten. However, the club would then struggle, with Denis Smith eventually being sacked in January 2007 with Wrexham in the bottom half of the division and after a poor run of results. He was replaced by coach Brian Carey. Wrexham finished 19th in League Two with 51 points after an impressive late run of form which saw them win 4 out of their last 5 games, which included defeating local rivals Shrewsbury in the last derby match at Gay Meadow. Wrexham's league status was saved on the last day of the season with a vital 3–1 victory on 5 May 2007 over Boston United at home which sent their opponents down to the Conference Premier and ensured that Wrexham would stay in the Football League.

Expectations were high for the 2007–08 season, with fans expecting a promotion push. However, the season started badly with the club in 24th by November 2007. Brian Carey was eventually sacked, and on 15 November 2007, Brian Little was named as Wrexham's new manager and the replacement to Carey, who took the role of assistant manager. After a promising start to his reign, Wrexham experienced a run of seven straight league defeats, prompting the club to bring in eleven new players during the January transfer window. Wrexham went six matches unbeaten before some poor form which saw defeats against some fellow strugglers. Wrexham were finally relegated to non-League following a 2–0 defeat away at Hereford United, ending the club's 87-year stay in the Football League.

=== The non-League years (2008–2020) ===
The 2008–09 season started well, with a 5–0 home victory against Stevenage Borough. However a run of poor results followed, with Wrexham being left in the mid-table battle, only four points above the relegation zone and only keeping two clean sheets all season. Following a 3–0 home defeat against Rushden and Diamonds, and fans calling for his dismissal, Little left Wrexham by mutual consent. Little was replaced by Dean Saunders. Wrexham's first full season in the Conference Premier ended in a disappointing 10th place. The following year, 2009–10, ended in a similar fashion with Wrexham finishing in 11th position, well off the pace of the promotion battle.

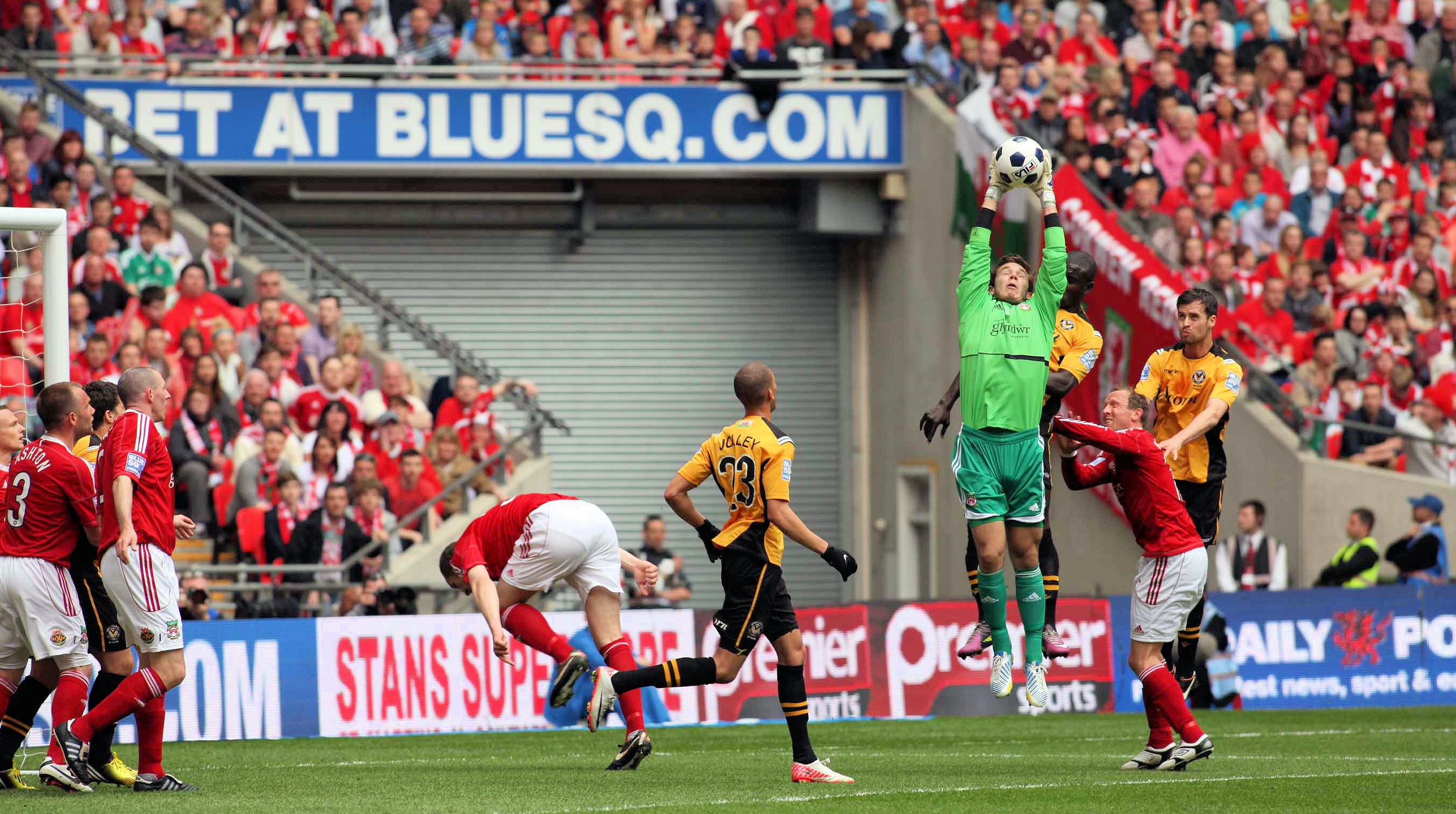
Wrexham at Wembley Stadium in 2013

In 2010, the club entered into a ground share at the Racecourse Ground with Celtic Crusaders rugby league club, which lasted until 2016. This ground share was credited with helping Wrexham through its administration with then Chief Executive Paul Retout stating "We can't survive if only 1,800 fans are coming through the gates".

In March 2011, the ownership of the club became subject to two bids: one from Wrexham Supporters' Trust and another from local businesswoman Stephanie Booth. Wrexham's MP and AM indicated that they would prefer Wrexham Supporters' Trust to secure the bid. A third bid later came in, but after WST and Booth came to an agreement, their bid was then re-accepted. In April 2011, the club was served with a winding-up order from HMRC, with an unpaid tax bill of just under £200,000. The team finished the 2010–11 season in 4th place, qualifying for a playoff spot, but were beaten 5–1 on aggregate by Luton Town in the semi-final.

During the 2011–12 season, Wrexham were invited back into the Welsh Cup after 16 years, entering at the third round stage. New manager Andy Morrell guided Wrexham to a record tally of 98 points but this was not enough to gain automatic promotion, as they ended the season only 5 points adrift of Fleetwood Town, who gained the only automatic place. Wrexham lost in the play-offs to Luton Town again. Wrexham earned themselves places in both the FA Trophy final and the Conference Premier play-off final, their first two appearances at Wembley Stadium in the club's 150-year history to date, and within five weeks of one another. In the FA Trophy final, Wrexham won on penalties after a 1–1 draw with Grimsby Town. A 5–2 aggregate win over Kidderminster Harriers in the two-legged play-off semi-final saw Wrexham through to the final versus Newport County, the first play-off final to feature two Welsh teams; Newport defeated Wrexham 2–0.

In June 2013, members of Wrexham Supporters Trust voted on whether they should change the club's name back to Wrexham AFC. As a result, the name was changed.

In February 2014, Andy Morrell stepped down as manager. Billy Barr was appointed as interim manager before being replaced a few weeks later by Kevin Wilkin. Wrexham finished the 2013–14 season in 17th place. The team made it to the 2015 FA Trophy final but lost to North Ferriby United A.F.C. on penalties.

In 2018–19, Wrexham finished in 4th place but lost the play-off quarter-final to Eastleigh. In 2019–20, the club finished 19th on points per game after the season was ended early due to the COVID-19 pandemic, the lowest position in the club's 150-year history.

=== New owners, the Parkinson era, and rise to the Championship (2020–present) ===
In November 2020, American actor Rob McElhenney and Canadian actor Ryan Reynolds, through their RR McReynolds Company LLC, bought the club. The deal received the backing of 98.6% of the 2,000 members of the Wrexham Supporters Trust that voted and was completed in February 2021. They were included in FIFA 22 as part of the "Rest of World" section, becoming the first non-league team to be featured in the series.

Following the takeover, a docuseries called Welcome to Wrexham was produced by Boardwalk Pictures for FX. The series debuted on 24 August 2022 on FX and Hulu in the United States, followed by a release on Disney+ in the United Kingdom and Ireland the next day. The acquisition by Reynolds and McElhenney and the attendant publicity from Welcome to Wrexham had a significant impact on the club's visibility, leading to its acquiring a new global fanbase with no precedent for a team in the fifth tier. The club's fortunes began to attract dedicated coverage from global sporting media that would not typically be afforded teams outside the Premier League. This, in turn, inspired a debate about the potential replicability of this strategy for other lesser-known clubs and leagues, with The Guardian remarking that "everybody wants to 'do a Wrexham', but not everybody can."

During the 2021–22 season, under the leadership of newly hired manager Phil Parkinson, Wrexham finished second before losing the play-off semi-final 5–4 to Grimsby Town after extra time. Wrexham also reached the 2022 FA Trophy final which they lost 1–0 to Bromley.

During the 2022–23 season, the team progressed to the fourth round in the 2022–23 FA Cup, being the only National League team to do so, beating Coventry City in an upset in the third round, and eventually being knocked out by Sheffield United in a replay. The first game against Sheffield United, which ended in a 3–3 draw, was ESPN's most followed football game across its digital platforms. Wrexham tied with Notts County throughout the season to lead the league, trading the first spot back and forth, and both setting new National League records for wins, goals, and goal difference, while 20+ points ahead of the third place team by the end of the season. Wrexham secured winning their first league title in 45 years, and were promoted to the EFL League Two after a 15-year absence, following a 3–1 win against Boreham Wood. The club amassed a tally of 111 points that season, a record for the top five divisions of English league football, beating Notts County to the championship and single automatic promotion spot. Wrexham's income increased to over £10 million in the year ending in June 2023.

During the 2023–24 season, Wrexham secured a second successive promotion, taking the club to EFL League One, the third tier of the English football system and ultimately finished second behind Stockport County. Wrexham was awarded Category Four status as an EFL academy from the 2023–24 campaign with the short-term aim to reach Category Three status and operate an Under-18 side. Club Necaxa's backers purchased 5% of Wrexham AFC in April 2024 and both owners, in turn, purchased a minority stake in Necaxa. The academy was awarded Category Three status as an EFL academy for the 2024–25 season. The football club joined the European Club Association in August 2024.

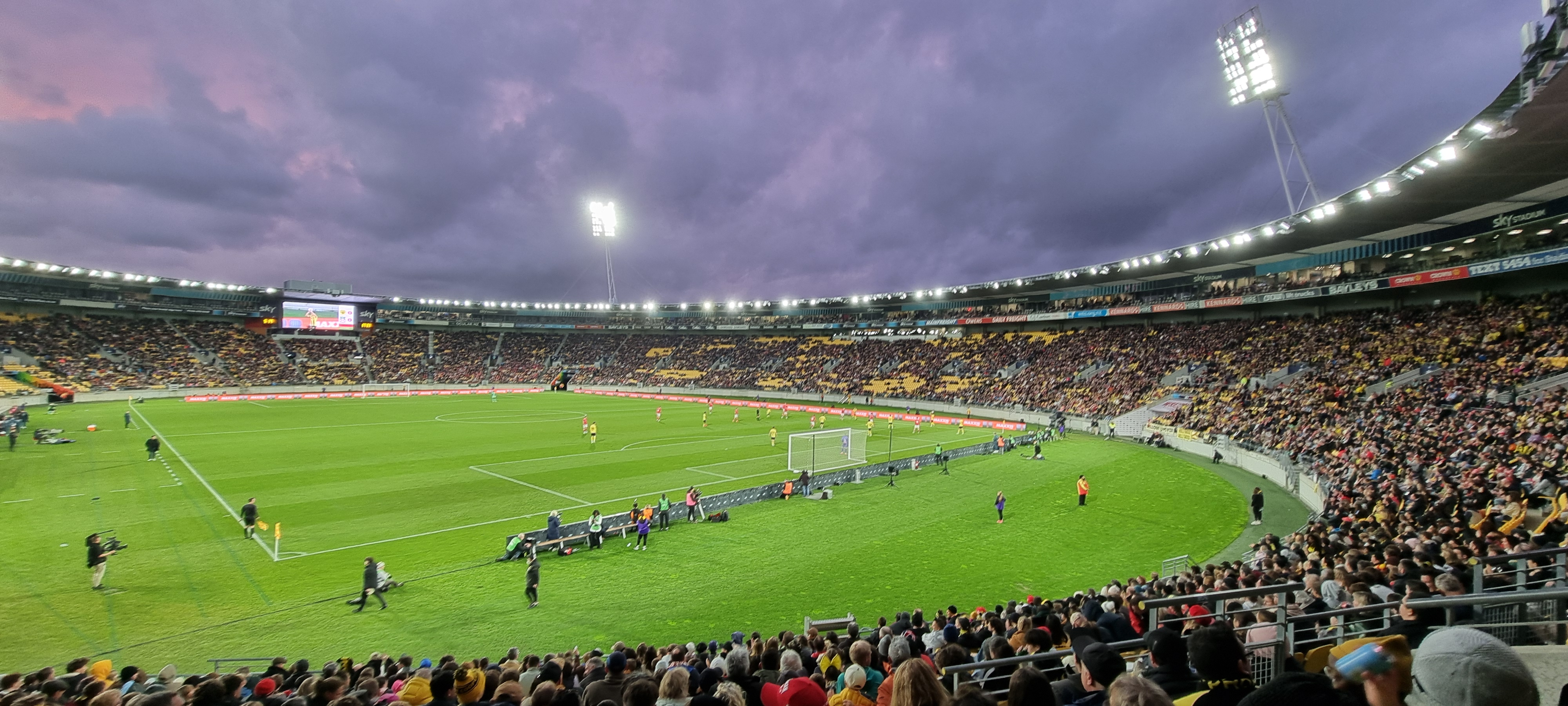
Wrexham playing away to Wellington Phoenix as part of the Wrexham Down Under preseason tour.

The 2024–25 season began with Wrexham's first League One match in 19 years, and with the 5,000th recorded league match for the club, winning at home 3–2 to Wycombe Wanderers. The Allyn family of Skaneateles, New York was announced as a new minority investor in the club in October 2024, reportedly taking a near-15% stake, and the club's worth rose to £100 million. The club's financial statements for the 2023–24 season revealed in March 2025 that the loans from Reynolds and McElhenney, grown to £15 million, had been fully repaid and that the turnover of £26.7 million set a record for a League Two side. Wrexham AFC joined the Football for the Goals initiative of the United Nations in the same month. On 26 April, Wrexham won promotion to the EFL Championship after beating Charlton Athletic 3–0 at home and finished second behind Birmingham City. They made history by becoming the first club across the top five tiers of English football to achieve three consecutive promotions. This led to the club's valuation increasing to about £150 million according to football finance expert Kieran Maguire, an increase of 7,400% within 4 years. In December 2025, Wrexham sold a minority stake in the Welsh football club to Apollo Sports Capital, a US-based private equity firm. The club's financial statements for the 2024–25 season, released in March 2026, revealed a turnover of £33.35 million, the highest ever recorded by a League One club not receiving parachute payments.

The 2025–26 season was Wrexham's first back in the Championship since 1982; they finished the campaign in 7th place, missing the play-off places by two points. This marked the club’s highest-ever league finish.

== Colours and club badge ==
Wrexham's home colours are red and white, with the kit itself consisting of a red shirt and white shorts/socks since the late 1930s. Traditional away kit colours have been an inverted colour scheme (i.e. a white shirt and red shorts/socks); however, in recent years several colours have been used. In 2014–15, to celebrate the club's 150th anniversary, Wrexham wore a red and black hooped Nike home shirt as this was the club's first ever recorded home shirt. Following the 2021–22 season, the kit now also has the number "1934" embroidered on the back neck, in remembrance of the Gresford disaster.

The club has previously worn five other badges on their shirts, prior to their current badge being implemented in 2015. The first, used between 1950 and 1975, was an adoption of the Wrexham borough coat of arms from the 1850s and featured croziers to represent grazing on the land around. In 1973, a new club badge was adopted, following a design competition in a local newspaper, with three prominent segments:

1. The top section, features the feathers of the Prince of Wales and the motto "Ich dien", which means "I serve" in German. The motto is also a near homophone for Eich Dyn, i.e. "Your Man" in Welsh. In addition, the green background is one of the two background field colours of the Welsh flag;
2. The middle section, features two dragons to represent the nation of Wales and a football to mark the sport played by the club. In addition, the white background is the other background field colour of the Welsh flag; and,
3. The bottom section, contains both the club name and founding year.

In subsequent years, different iterations of the club crest have involved changes to the team name (i.e. fluctuating between Wrexham AFC and Wrexham FC, depending on club ownership) and the founding year (i.e. changed from 1873 to 1864, following unearthed documents revealing the club was founded earlier). From the 2015–26 season onwards, the club crest has effectively been the 1973 design but with the founding year amended to 1864.

=== Kit suppliers and shirt sponsors ===
From 2016 onwards, Macron have been the kit supplier of Wrexham AFC.

During the 2023–24 season, the team's training kit was sponsored by Betty Buzz (Betty Booze), a beverage company owned by Blake Lively. On 7 July 2025, Ancestry.com was confirmed as an official club partner and the company logo will feature on the front of 2025–26 training wear.

Period	Brand	Shirt sponsor (chest)	Shirt sponsor (back)	Shirt sponsor (sleeve)
1984–85	Patrick	Crosville Buses	none	none
1985–87	Winning Ways	Marston's	none	none
1987–88	Hi-Tec Sports	Marston's	none	none
1988–89	Admiral Sportswear	Marston's	none	none
1989–91	Spall	Marston's	none	none
1991–92	EN-S	Marston's	none	none
1992–98	EN-S	Wrexham Lager	none	none
1998–2002	Super League	Wrexham Lager	none	none
2002–04	Vandanel	Gap Personnel	none	none
2004–06	Vandanel	Just Go	none	none
2006–08	Vandanel	Lease Direct	none	none
2008–11	Umbro	Lease Direct	none	none
2011–12	Puma	Glyndŵr University	none	none
2012–14	Adidas	Glyndŵr University	none	none
2014–15	Nike	Glyndŵr University	none	none
2015–16	Adidas	Glyndŵr University	none	none
2016–21	Macron	Ifor Williams Trailers	none	none
2021–22	Macron	TikTok	Expedia	Aviation American Gin
2022–23	Macron	TikTok	Expedia	Vistaprint
2023–24	Macron	United Airlines	Vistaprint	HP Inc.
2024–26	Macron	United Airlines	Meta Quest	HP Inc.
2026–present	Macron	Firefox	Royal Bank of Canada	Nex Playground

== Players ==
=== First-team squad ===
As of 10 October 2026

Note: Flags indicate national team as defined under FIFA eligibility rules; some limited exceptions apply. Players may hold more than one non-FIFA nationality.

No.	Pos.	Nation	Player
2	DF	ENG	Callum Doyle
3	DF	GAB	Jacques Ekomié
4	DF	ENG	Max Cleworth
5	DF	SCO	Dominic Hyam (captain)
6	DF	ENG	Joe Worrall
8	MF	ENG	Ben Whiteman
10	MF	ENG	Josh Windass
11	FW	JAM	Bailey Cadamarteri
12	DF	BFA	Issa Kaboré
13	DF	NZL	Liberato Cacace
14	MF	ENG	George Thomason
15	MF	ENG	George Dobson
17	MF	ENG	Callum O'Hare
18	MF	ENG	Ben Sheaf
19	FW	WAL	Kieffer Moore

No.	Pos.	Nation	Player
20	MF	ENG	Oliver Rathbone
21	GK	WAL	Danny Ward
22	GK	ENG	Anthony Patterson
23	DF	ENG	Sebastian Revan
25	GK	ENG	Callum Burton
26	DF	KEN	Zak Vyner
27	MF	ENG	Lewis O'Brien
28	FW	ENG	Sam Smith
30	DF	ENG	Danny Imray
33	FW	WAL	Nathan Broadhead
34	DF	ENG	Aaron James
37	MF	ENG	Matty James
47	MF	ENG	Ryan Longman
50	FW	PHI	Samuel Chesworth

=== Out on loan ===
Note: Flags indicate national team as defined under FIFA eligibility rules; some limited exceptions apply. Players may hold more than one non-FIFA nationality.

No.	Pos.	Nation	Player
1	GK	NGR	Arthur Okonkwo (on loan at Charlton Athletic until 30 June 2027)
7	FW	ENG	Davis Keillor-Dunn (on loan at Sheffield Wednesday until January 2027)
9	FW	SCO	Ryan Hardie (on loan at Bolton Wanderers until 30 June 2027)
29	MF	ENG	Ryan Barnett (on loan at Milton Keynes Dons until 30 June 2027)

No.	Pos.	Nation	Player
40	MF	ENG	Alex Moore (on loan at Colwyn Bay until January 2027)
—	FW	GAM	Mo Faal (on loan at Port Vale until 30 June 2027)
—	FW	ENG	Rio Owen (on loan at AFC Telford United until 30 June 2027)

=== Academy ===
Note: Flags indicate national team as defined under FIFA eligibility rules; some limited exceptions apply. Players may hold more than one non-FIFA nationality.

No.	Pos.	Nation	Player
—	GK	WAL	Jake Hall
—	GK	ENG	Miles Lewis
—	GK	NIR	Dan O'Keefe
—	DF	WAL	Finn Bridges
—	DF	ENG	Tommy Clayton
—	DF	WAL	Dafydd Edwards
—	DF	ENG	Lenny Lowe
—	DF	ENG	Louie May-Hawkins
—	DF	WAL	Ben McEvoy
—	DF	WAL	Connor Thorley
—	DF	ENG	Harry Wakenshaw
—	DF	WAL	Joe Williams
—	MF	AUS	Lennon Biggs
—	MF	WAL	Henry Jones

No.	Pos.	Nation	Player
—	MF	WAL	Jac Jones
—	MF	WAL	Evan Lewis
—	MF	ENG	Oliver McTweed
—	MF	ENG	Carrick Murphy
—	MF	ENG	Kian Nolan
—	MF	WAL	Joe Rees
—	MF	ENG	Sebastian Saverimutto
—	MF	WAL	Nikolas Slosarczyk
—	MF	WAL	Jayden Smyth
—	FW	ENG	Anthony Connolly
—	FW	ENG	Wesley Graham
—	FW	WAL	Thomas Watkin
—	FW	ENG	Julian Widecki-Estima

=== Reserves ===
Between 1988 and 1995 the reserve team of Wrexham played in the Welsh football leagues.

On 2 August 2022, Wrexham announced their participation in the Central League and remained active in this league as of the 2024–25 season.

=== Notable former players ===
For all players with a Wikipedia article, see Wrexham A.F.C. players.

For a complete list of players, see List of Wrexham A.F.C. players with 100+ appearances, 25–99 appearances and 1–24 appearances.

==== Hall of Fame ====
The following are members of the Wrexham A.F.C. Hall of Fame. Entry is not restricted to players; anyone who has made a great contribution to the club in any capacity can be considered.

Name (England) Billy Ashcroft (Wales) Tommy Bamford (Scotland) Tommy Bannan (England) Ken Barnes (England) Gary Bennett (Wales) Horace Blew (Republic of Ireland) Brian Carey (England) Mark Carrington (Wales) Ron Chaloner (Wales) Carroll Clark (England) Karl Connolly (Wales) Dai Davies (Wales) Gareth Davies (Trinidad and Tobago) Carlos Edwards (Wales) Johnny Edwards (Wales) Mickey Evans (Wales) Brian Flynn	Name (Wales) Alan Fox (England) Bert Goode (Wales) Arfon Griffiths (Wales) Pryce Griffiths (Republic of Ireland) Phil Hardy (Wales) Ron Hewitt (England) Alf Jones (Wales) Joey Jones (England) Albert Kinsey (Trinidad and Tobago) Dennis Lawrence (Wales) Brian Lloyd (Wales) Cliff Lloyd (Wales) Andy Marriott (Wales) Tommy Matthias (England) Eddie May (Scotland) Ally McGowan (England) Sammy McMillan	Name (England) Dixie McNeil (England) Andy Morrell (England) John Neal (Wales) Gareth Owen (Wales) Ted Robinson (England) Kevin Russell (England) Bobby Shinton (England) George Showell (England) Denis Smith (England) Ray Smith (England) Mel Sutton (Wales) Mickey Thomas (England) Billy Tunnicliffe (England) Graham Whittle (Wales) Mike Williams (Wales) Wrexham Supporters Trust

=== Player records ===
- Most goals in a season in all competitions: Tommy Bamford – 51 (1933–34)
- Most League goals in a season: Tommy Bamford – 44 (1933–34, Division Three North)
- Most league goals in total: Tommy Bamford – 175
- Most hat tricks: Tommy Bamford – 16
- Most goals scored in a single game by one player: Andy Morrell – 7 (against Merthyr Tydfil, 16 February 2000)
- Most league appearances: 592 – Arfon Griffiths (1959–61, 1962–79)
- Most appearances in total: 713 – Arfon Griffiths (1959–61, 1962–79)
- Most capped player: 146 – Daniel Bennett, Singapore
- Most caps while at Wrexham: 49 – Dennis Lawrence, Trinidad & Tobago
- Oldest player: Bobby Roberts – 43 years, 88 days (against Worcester City, 29 October 1983)
- Youngest player: Ken Roberts – 15 years, 158 days (against Bradford PA, 1 September 1951)

== Non-playing staff ==
=== Coaching staff ===
As of 15 October 2026

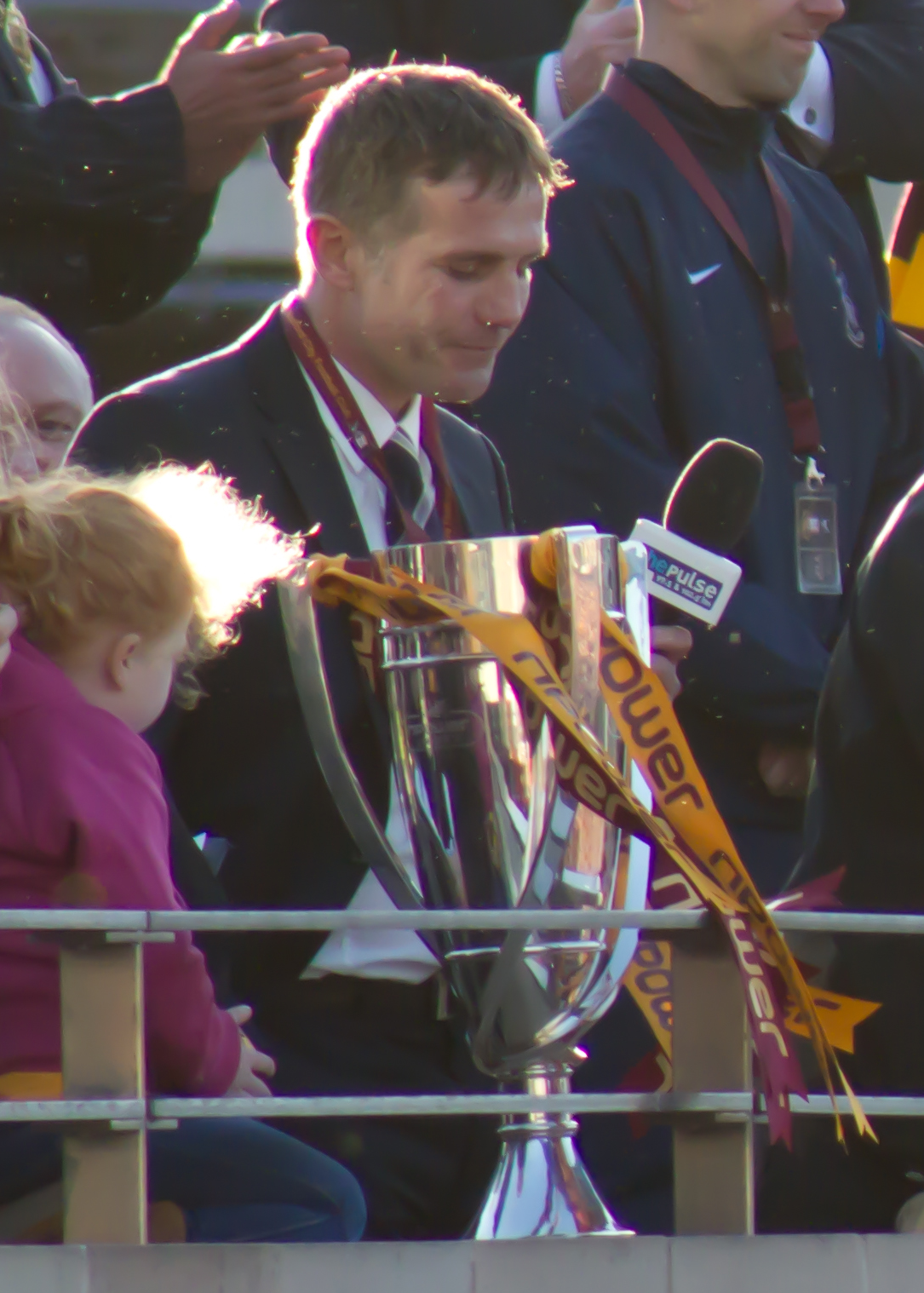
Current Wrexham manager Phil Parkinson joined the club in 2021.

Role	Name
Sporting Director	Steve Nickson
Manager	(England) Phil Parkinson
Assistant manager	(England) Steve Parkin
First-team coach	(England) David Jones
Goalkeeper coach	(Northern Ireland) Aidan Davison
Head of First-team operations	(England) Adam Greaves-Smith
Club doctor	(England) Dr. Dave Perry
Head of performance, medicine and sport science	(Republic of Ireland) Kevin Mulholland
First team physiotherapist	(Wales) Catherine Beattie
First team sports therapist	(England) Ryan Murray
First team sports therapist	(England) Ashley Paynter
First team sports scientist	(England) Owen Jackson
First team strength and conditioning coach	(England) Richard Hill
Performance analyst	(England) Kyle Crutchley
Performance analyst	(England) George Parkinson
Performance analyst	(England) Oli Staines
Nutritionist	Danny Webber
Kitman	(Wales) Iwan Pugh-Jones

=== Academy staff ===
As of 15 October 2026

Role	Name
Academy manager	Gus Williams
Senior PDP and Player Pathways Lead	Craig Knight
Head of academy coach development	Pav Singh
Head of recruitment	Paul Johnson
Head of player care	Toby Rossiter
Head of education & welfare	Kierenne Baldwin
Senior physiotherapist	Dan Jones
PDP coach	Dan Moore
YDP lead	Gareth Richards
FP lead	Finnley Harris
Lead sports scientist	Luke Wakeling
Lead goalkeeping coach	Harri Lloyd
S&C coaches	Greg Kettlewell
S&C coaches	Sam Prior

=== Club staff ===
As of 9 September 2026

Role	Name
Director of Facilities	Andrew Powlesland
Commercial Director	Tom Prosser
Head of Stadium Experience and Fan Engagement	Yonit Sharabi
Head of Ticketing Operation and Fan Services	Iwan Williams
Head of Stadium Operations	Julie Greenwood
Safety Officer	Martin Bradley
Head of People	Ann-Marie Bradley
Head of Safeguarding	Jamie Dixon
Head of Partnership Management	Jamie Lewis
Head of Media & Communications	Colin Henrys
Head of Foundation & Community	Jamie Edwards
Head of Marketing & Brand	Ged Hawes
Head of Licensing and Retail	Mike Walker
Supporter Liaison Officer	Kerry Evans
Disability Access Officer	Kerry Evans
Club historian	Geraint Parry

=== Managerial history ===
Managerial history for Wrexham AFC from 1912 to present.

Manager	Years
(England) Ted Robinson	1912–1924
(Wales) Charlie Hewitt	1924–1929
(England) Jack Baynes	1929–1931
(England) Ernest Blackburn	1932–1937
(Scotland) Jimmy Logan	1937–1938
(England) Tom Morgan	1938–1940
(England) Tom Williams	1940–1949
(Scotland) Les McDowall	1949–1950
(England) Peter Jackson	1950–1954
(Wales) Cliff Lloyd	1954–1957
(Scotland) John Love	1957–1959
(Wales) Cliff Lloyd	1959–1960
(Wales) Billy Morris	1960–1961
(England) Ken Barnes	1961–1965
(Wales) Billy Morris	1965
(England) Jack Rowley	1966–1967
(Wales) Alvan Williams	1967–1968
(England) John Neal	1968–1977
(Wales) Arfon Griffiths	1977–1981
(England) Mel Sutton	1981–1982
(Scotland) Bobby Roberts	1982–1985

Manager	Years
(England) Dixie McNeil	1985–1989
(Wales) Brian Flynn	1989–2001
(Wales) Joey Jones (caretaker)	2001
(England) Denis Smith	2001–2007
(Republic of Ireland) Brian Carey	2007
(England) Brian Little	2007–2008
(Wales) Dean Saunders	2008–2011
(England) Andy Morrell	2011–2014
(England) Billy Barr (caretaker)	2014
(England) Kevin Wilkin	2014–2015
(England) Gary Mills	2015
(England) Dean Keates	2016–2018
(Wales) Carl Darlington (caretaker)	2018
(Wales) Andy Davies (caretaker)	2018
(Wales) Sam Ricketts	2018
(England) Graham Barrow	2018–2019
(England) Bryan Hughes	2019
(Wales) Brian Flynn (caretaker)	2019
(England) Dean Keates	2019–2021
(England) Phil Parkinson	2021–present

== Supporters ==
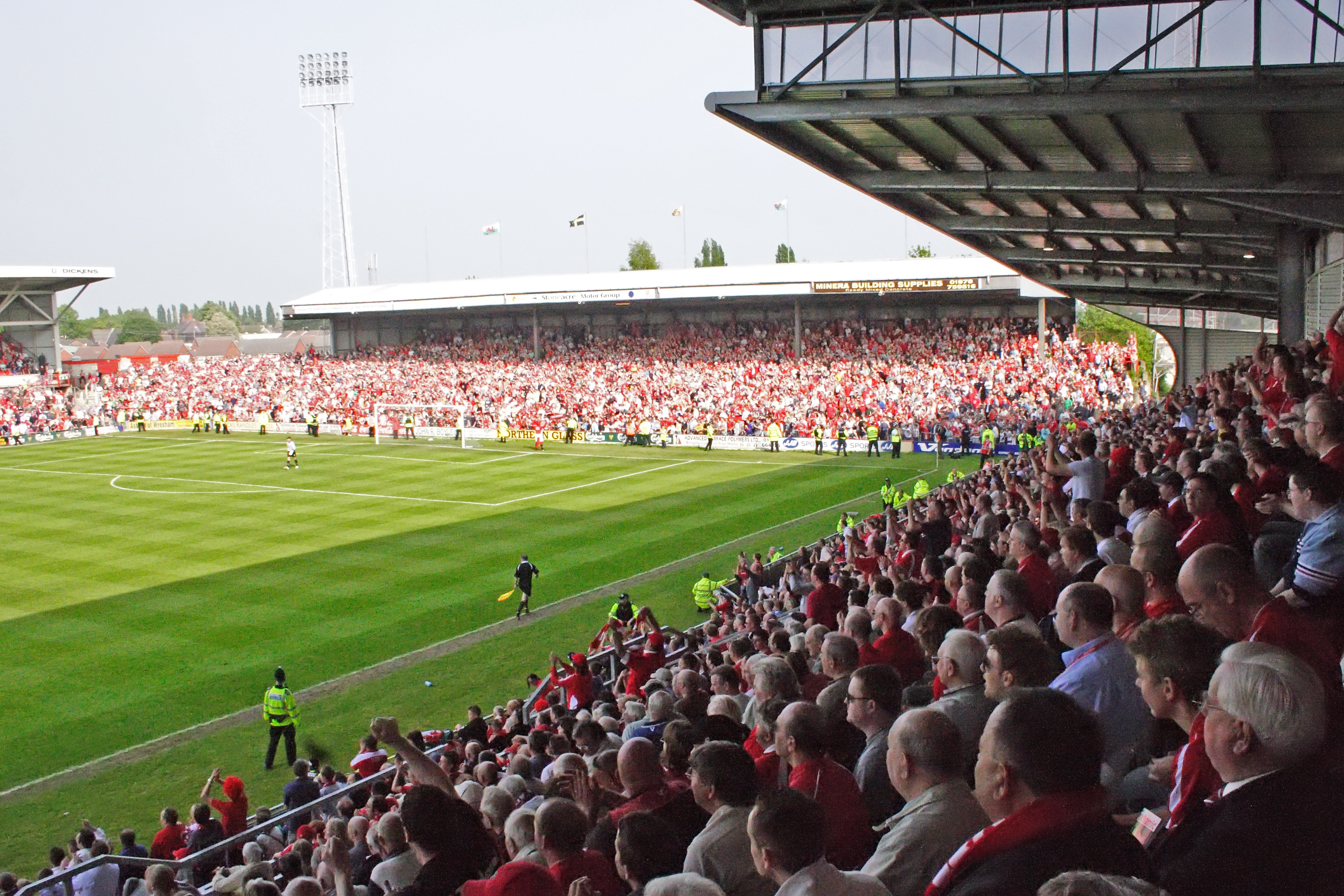
A sold out Kop End and Mold Road Stand

Wrexham is regarded as "the heart and soul of this Welsh community", and has been since the club was founded on 4 October 1864, in The Turf Tavern. In fact, when faced with being expelled from the Football Conference in 2011, fans rallied and subsequently raised £127,000 in a single day so that the club could play in the forthcoming season. A month later, the Wrexham Supporters' Trust (WST) took over the day-to-day running of the club, and fan ownership of Wrexham was officially ratified on 12 December 2011. The Wrexham fans and local community "saved the club" from government administration, and at one point, the Wrexham Supporters' Trust had 4,129 adult members and joint-owners of the club.

In 2020, following the takeover by Rob McElhenney and Ryan Reynolds from the WST, alongside the global publicity and critical success of the Welcome to Wrexham documentary series, Wrexham AFC experienced a surge in popularity and likewise, an unprecedented new international fanbase for an at the time non-league team.

In addition to the city of Wrexham, support for the club is drawn from nearby towns in North Wales, across the border in Shropshire, and exiled supporters clubs in South Wales, Manchester and London. Notably, Wrexham also have a namesake club in Uganda, i.e. Wrexham F.C. Uganda, established in 2009 by the Welsh charity Teams4U.

=== Team mascot and nickname(s) ===
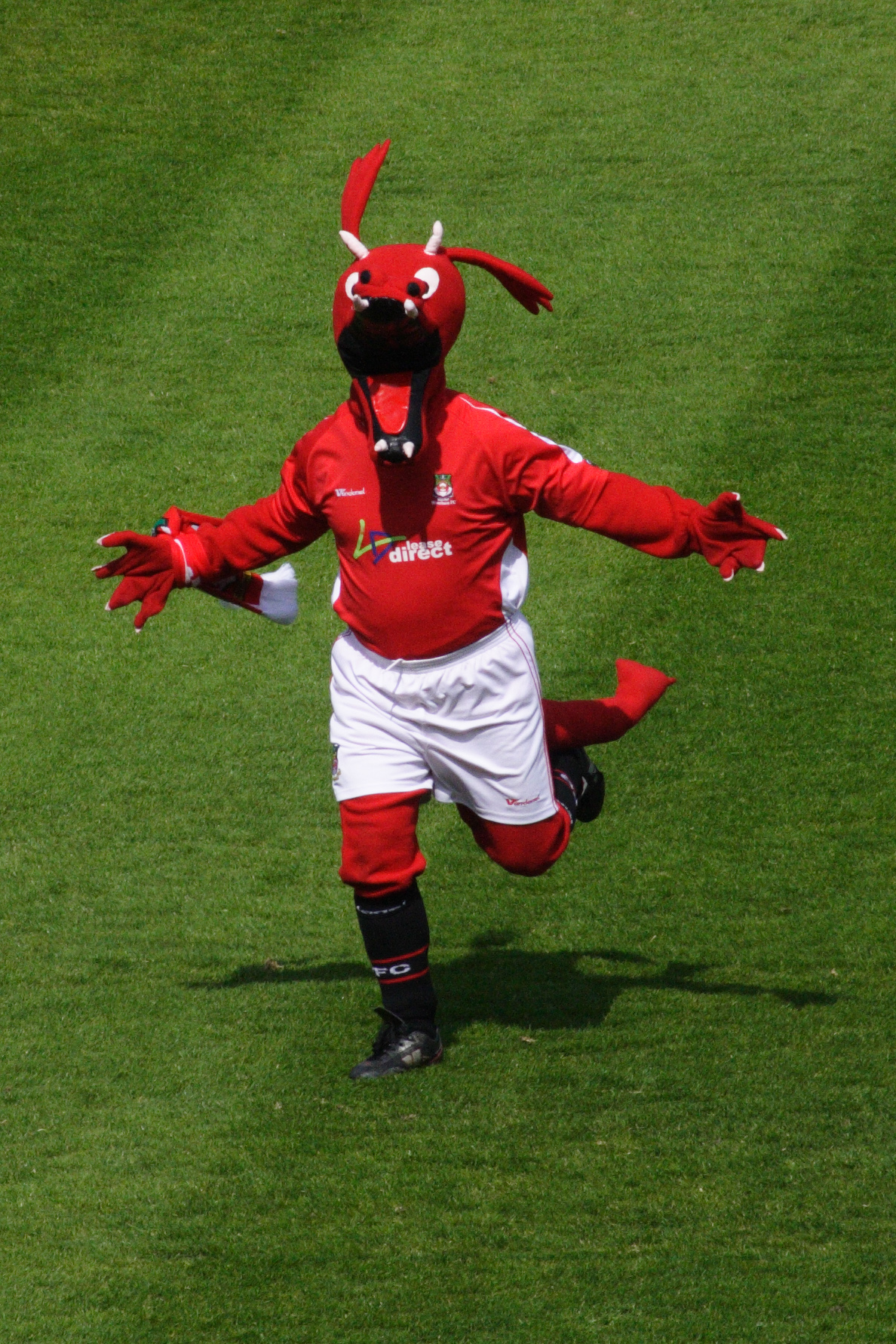
Wrex the Dragon

The club's official team mascot is 'Wrex the Dragon', who made his debut when Wrexham played Manchester United in a testimonial match for Kevin Reeves and Brian Flynn on 4 August 2001, at the Racecourse Ground. The mascot, along with the team nickname the 'Red Dragons', was introduced in the 2001–02 season in order to help promote the club and broaden the club's Welsh image. This change was made to better differentiate the club from Bristol City, Swindon Town and Cheltenham Town, who had the same nickname as Wrexham at the time (i.e. 'The Robins').

In 2024, the role of Wrex was played by Anthony Hopkins in an advertisement for STōK Cold Brew during the Super Bowl.

== Rivalries ==
Wrexham has a fierce rivalry with Chester; the two contest the cross-border derby. The clubs are located just 10 miles apart, but are Welsh and English respectively. The first match was held in 1888 with Wrexham running out 3–2 winners at Faulkner Street, the former home of Chester City; the most recent was played in March 2018 with Wrexham winning 2–0 at the Racecourse Ground. Wrexham lead the head-to-head rivalry with 67 wins compared to Chester's 50. Games between the two are classed as "high risk" for the potential of disorder and are generally moved to early kick-offs with a large police presence to prevent it, though arrests do still occur for various offenses surrounding the fans of both clubs.

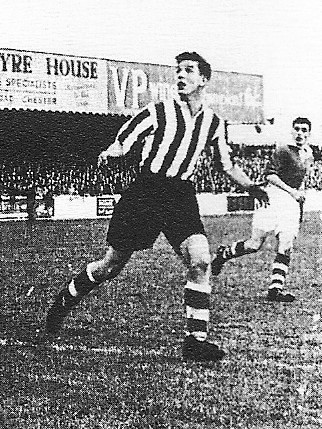
Chester vs Wrexham in 1954

Former Chester City player Lee Dixon said of the derby "I'm telling you, Chester versus Wrexham was a real derby! It's difficult to compare if you've not played in each one but there's something special about any derby at any level. I played for Chester v Wrexham and that could get ferocious, it lost nothing in ferocity compared to Arsenal v Spurs". Former Wales and Liverpool striker Ian Rush, who played for both clubs, said in 2013 that the cross-border derby between the two clubs is "as intense as they come" and "It is like Wales v England really, it is incredible".

Wrexham also have a fierce rivalry with Shrewsbury Town and Tranmere Rovers due to geographical proximity. The games are often moved to early kick-offs, in accordance with police wishes, to minimize the potential of trouble as has happened between clubs previously. In 2003, 32 hooligans were jailed after a Tranmere v Wrexham match at Prenton Park and trouble was again evident when the two clubs met in a 2013 friendly at the Racecourse Ground. Though not as intense as they once were, due to divisional differences, Crewe Alexandra and Port Vale, as well as fellow Welsh clubs Cardiff City, Newport County, and Swansea City are also classed as rivals. Wrexham is represented by a hooligan firm known as the 'Front Line' that have been involved in major disorder around Britain since the early 1980s.

Recent seasons have also seen rivalries cultivated with both Stockport County and Notts County after Wrexham battled Stockport for the 2021–22 National League title, narrowly missing out in spite of a late season surge that saw Wrexham beat Stockport at home twice in the FA Trophy and League, before battling Notts County for the title in 2022–23 in a season that saw both teams clear the century mark for both goals and points with a 3–2 win on Easter Monday in 2023 for Wrexham, helped by a Ben Foster penalty save in the last minute, proving crucial as Wrexham finished 4 points clear of Notts to win the title and promotion back to the EFL. 2023–24 saw Wrexham win another promotion in 2nd place, just behind Stockport who won the league (although Wrexham beat them 2–1 at home on the final day of the season) to ensure the two would be in League One for the 2024–25 League One season. Wrexham would beat Stockport to promotion to the Championship in 2024–25 as they finished 2nd, 5 points clear of Stockport who were defeated in the playoffs.

Since being promoted to League One for the 2024–25 season, Wrexham have formed a rivalry with Birmingham City, who were relegated in the previous season from the Championship. The rivalry has been dubbed the "Hollywood Derby", as Wrexham is owned by American actor Rob McElhenney and Canadian-American actor Ryan Reynolds while Birmingham is partially owned by former American football quarterback Tom Brady. Brady has since sold his minority stake in Birmingham.

== Ownership and management ==
=== Ownership ===
Wrexham AFC Limited is wholly owned by Wrexham Holdings LLC, which is then majority owned by the R.R. McReynolds Company LLC. Ownership of the R.R. McReynolds Company LLC is split equally between Rob McElhenney and Ryan Reynolds, such that they are jointly ultimate beneficial owners of the majority of Wrexham AFC Limited.

In terms of minor stakes in Wrexham Holdings LLC, five per cent is held by Al Tylis and Sam Porter (who also own around fifty per cent of Mexican Club Necaxa), and "up over 10 per cent" is owned by Red Dragon Ventures LLC. Red Dragon Ventures LLC is owned by R.R. McReynolds Company LLC and Wrexham Scope LLC (which, is in turn owned by the Allyn Family), with the latter owning a majority stake.

The joint venture (Red Dragon Ventures LLC) further purchased a majority stake in the local firm Wrexham Lager in the same month.

In December 2025, it was announced the United States-based investment firm, Apollo Sports Capital (part of asset management company, Apollo Global Management, Inc.) had acquired a minority stake in Wrexham. No details about the amount of investment nor shareholding was disclosed.

In November 2026, Wrexham AFC announced the departure of CEO Michael Williamson, they confirmed that Shaun Harvey would take over as Acting Chief Executive Officer.

Wrexham Holdings LLC Ownership Breakdown
Person / People	Associated company	Shares	Ref.
Rob McElhenney and Ryan Reynolds	R.R. McReynolds Company LLC	85% (approx.)	
Allyn Family	Red Dragons Ventures LLC (via Wrexham Scope LLC)	10% (approx.)	
Al Tylis and Sam Porter	Al Tylis and Sam Porter Investment Group	5%	

=== Board of directors ===
As of 6 November 2026

Role	Name
Chairman	Rob McElhenney & Ryan Reynolds
Directors	Kaleen Allyn, Shaun Harvey, Caroline Hutchinson, Thayer Joyce, George Dewey, Ricky Engelberg, Lee Solomon, Elis Jones
Acting Chief Executive Officer	Shaun Harvey
Chief Financial Officer	Mark Smith
Chief Business and Communications Officer	Rob Faulkner
Chief of Staff	Tina Roberts
Strategy & Projects Director	Aidan Miller

=== Honorary ===
Role	Name
Club President	Dixie McNeil
Vice Presidents	Dave Bennett
Vice Presidents	Dave Griffiths
Vice Presidents	Spencer Harris
Vice Presidents	Gavin Jones
Vice Presidents	Rob Parry
Vice Presidents	Phil Salmon
Vice Presidents	Mark Williams

== Stadium ==
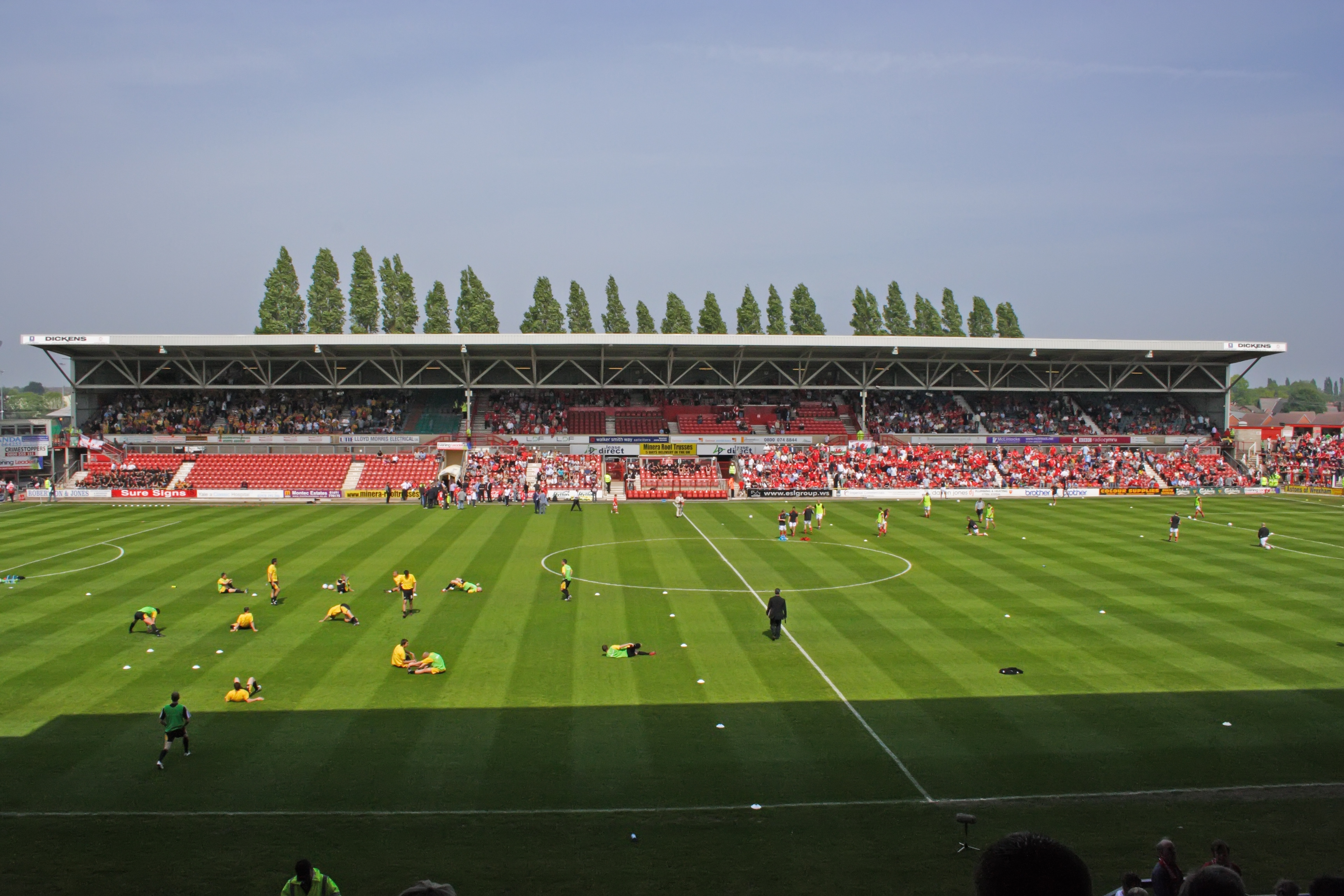
The Racecourse Ground

Wrexham's home stadium is the Racecourse Ground (Welsh: Y Cae Ras), and has been since the club was formed in 1864. It is the world's oldest international football stadium that still hosts international matches, having been the venue for Wales' first home international match in 1877, and has hosted more Wales international matches than any other ground.

In 2011, Wrexham University purchased the stadium and the club training facilities in Gresford, adding their name to the stadium for a period: i.e., The Glyndŵr University Racecourse Stadium. Subsequently, in 2016, the Wrexham Supporters Trust secured a 99-year lease on the ground, and the name reverted to the Racecourse Ground. In 2022, Wrexham AFC Limited purchased the Racecourse Ground freehold from the university.

The current capacity of the Racecourse Ground is 10,500. This made it one of the largest stadiums in the National League; however, following Wrexham's promotions it is now one of the smallest stadiums in the EFL Championship. On 3 March 2025, Wrexham County Borough councillors approved the proposal for the construction of a new 5,500-seater Kop stand at the ground. The club aims to have it ready in time for the 2026/27 season, as the stadium is scheduled to host UEFA European Under-19 Championship matches. An additional 2,000 seats may be made available if given planning permission, bringing the overall capacity of the stadium to over 18,000.

=== Training ground ===
Initially, Wrexham's training ground was the purpose-built Colliers Park, in neighbouring Gresford, opened in June 1997 at a building cost of £750,000. It was widely regarded in English football as one of the best training grounds outside the top flight, and has been used by the England national team, Barcelona, Rangers and the Wales national team for training purposes.

In 2011, Colliers Park was bought by Glyndwr University as part of their purchase of the Racecourse Ground. Following the acquisition, Wrexham AFC left the training grounds during the 2016–17 season due to financial costs, and Colliers Park has since been transformed into a National Development Centre by the Football Association of Wales.

Currently, whilst Wrexham still occasionally train at Colliers Park, the team is now forced to use multiple venues and does not have a permanent training venue.

== European record ==
European Cup Winners' Cup / UEFA Cup Winners' Cup:

Season	Competition	Round	Opponent	Home	Away	Aggregate	Ref
1972–73	Cup Winners' Cup	First round	(Switzerland) FC Zürich	2–1	1–1	3–2	
1972–73	Cup Winners' Cup	Second round	(Socialist Federal Republic of Yugoslavia) Hajduk Split	3–1	0–2	3–3	
1975–76	Cup Winners' Cup	First round	(Sweden) Djurgården	2–1	1–1	3–2	
1975–76	Cup Winners' Cup	Second round	(Poland) Stal Rzeszów	2–0	1–1	3–1	
1975–76	Cup Winners' Cup	Quarter-final	(Belgium) Anderlecht	1–1	0–1	1–2	
1978–79	Cup Winners' Cup	First round	(Socialist Federal Republic of Yugoslavia) Rijeka	2–0	0–3	2–3	
1979–80	Cup Winners' Cup	First round	(East Germany) FC Magdeburg	3–2	2–5	5–7	
1984–85	Cup Winners' Cup	First round	(Portugal) FC Porto	1–0	3–4	4–4	
1984–85	Cup Winners' Cup	Second round	(Italy) Roma	0–1	0–2	0–3	
1986–87	Cup Winners' Cup	First round	(Malta) Żurrieq	4–0	3–0	7–0	
1986–87	Cup Winners' Cup	Second round	(Spain) Real Zaragoza	2–2	0–0	2–2	
1990–91	Cup Winners' Cup	First round	(Denmark) Lyngby	0–0	1–0	1–0	
1990–91	Cup Winners' Cup	Second round	(England) Manchester United	0–2	0–3	0–5	
1995–96	Cup Winners' Cup	First round	(Romania) Petrolul Ploiești	0–0	0–1	0–1	

== Honours ==
Wrexham's first trophy was the Welsh Cup in 1877–78, which was also the inaugural edition of the tournament. The club went on to win the Welsh Cup a record twenty-three times, in addition to other domestic cups: namely, the FAW Premier Cup a record five times, and the Football League North Cup, Football League Trophy and FA Trophy each once.

In respect to league titles, the club won two titles in the Welsh Senior League and four titles in The Combination, prior to entering the Football League. In 1977–78, after decades in the English Football League, Wrexham finally won another league title in the form of the Third Division Championship. After an extended period of non-League football, the club won the 2022–23 National League and subsequently re-entered the English Football League; where, Wrexham have since finished second in back-to-back seasons (i.e. in the 2023–24 EFL League Two, and in the 2024–25 EFL League One).

Wrexham AFC's honours include:

League

- Third Division North / Third Division / League One (level 3)
  - Champions: 1977–78
  - Runners-up: 1932–33, 2024–25
- Fourth Division / Third Division / League Two (level 4)
  - Runners-up: 1969–70, 1992–93, 2023–24
  - Promoted: 1961–62, 2002–03
- National League (level 5)
  - Champions: 2022–23
  - Runners-up: 2011–12, 2021–22
- The Combination
  - Champions: 1900–01, 1901–02, 1902–03, 1904–05
- Welsh Senior League
  - Champions: 1894–95, 1895–96

Cup

- Football League Trophy
  - Winners: 2004–05
- FA Trophy
  - Winners: 2012–13
  - Runners-up: 2014–15, 2021–22
- Football League North Cup
  - Winners: 1943–44
- FAW Premier Cup
  - Winners: 1997–98, 1999–2000, 2000–01, 2002–03, 2003–04 (record)
- Welsh Cup
  - Winners (23): 1877–78, 1882–83, 1892–93, 1896–97, 1902–03, 1904–05, 1908–09, 1909–10, 1910–11, 1913–14, 1914–15, 1920–21, 1923–24, 1924–25, 1930–31, 1956–57, 1957–58, 1959–60, 1971–72, 1974–75, 1977–78, 1985–86, 1994–95 (record)
- Supporters Direct Cup
  - Winners: 2015–16 (shared)

== Club records ==
- Attendance – 42,402 v Liverpool F.C., Yankee Stadium, 30 July 2026
- League attendance – 29,261 v Chester City, Division Three, 26 December 1936
- Average attendance – 12,781, 2024–25
- Highest league win – 10–1 v Hartlepools United, 3 March 1962
- Worst league defeat – 9–0 v Brentford, Division Three, 15 October 1963
- Highest league finish – 7th, EFL Championship, 2025–26
- Lowest league finish – 17th, Conference National, 2013–14
- Biggest cup win – 6–0 v Charlton Athletic, FA Cup 3rd round, 5 January 1980
- Most games won in a row – 10, 5 April 2003 – 8 May 2003, 2002–03
- Most league wins in a season – 34, 2022–23
- Most goals in a season – 115, 2022–23
- Longest unbeaten run – 28, October 2022 – 7 April 2023, 2022–23
- Most consecutive league clean sheets – 7, 9 October – 26 November, 2011–12
- Most clean sheets in a season – 26, 1973–74 and 2018–19
- Highest transfer received – £800,000 for Bryan Hughes, Birmingham City, 1997
- Highest transfer fee paid – £7,500,000 for Nathan Broadhead, Ipswich Town, 2025

== See also ==
- Club of Pioneers – Global network of association football clubs
- List of Wrexham A.F.C. players (25–99 Appearances, 1–24 Appearances)
- List of Wrexham A.F.C. records and statistics
- List of Wrexham A.F.C. seasons
- Welcome to Wrexham – 2022 American sports documentary series
