= William Dallas (footballer) =

Scottish footballer (1931–2015)

Personal information
- Full name: William Robert Dempster Dallas
- Date of birth: 6 March 1931
- Place of birth: Glasgow, Scotland
- Date of death: 17 May 2015 (aged 84)
- Place of death: Brighton, Victoria, Australia
- Position: Defender

Senior career*
Years	Team	Apps	(Gls)
- Caledonian Amateurs
1952–1956	Luton Town	0	(0)
1956–1957	St Mirren	20	(2)
1957–1958	Wrexham	8	(0)
- Nuneaton Borough
- * Club domestic league appearances and goals

William Robert Dempster Dallas (6 March 1931 - 17 May 2015) was a Scottish former professional footballer who played as a defender. He made appearances in the Scottish Football League with St Mirren and in the English Football League with Wrexham
