= 1955–56 Carlisle United F.C. season =

Carlisle United F.C.
1955–56 season
- Manager: Fred Emery
- Stadium: Brunton Park
- Third Division North: 21st
- FA Cup: Third Round

For the 1955–56 season, Carlisle United F.C. competed in Football League Third Division North.

== Results & fixtures ==
=== Football League Third Division North ===
==== League table ====
Pos	Team	Pld	W	D	L	GF	GA	GAv	Pts	Promotion or relegation
19	Halifax Town	46	14	11	21	66	76	0.868	39	
20	Oldham Athletic	46	10	18	18	76	86	0.884	38	
21	Carlisle United	46	15	8	23	71	95	0.747	38	
22	Barrow	46	12	9	25	61	83	0.735	33	
23	Bradford Park Avenue	46	13	7	26	61	122	0.500	33	Re-elected

Source: rsssf.com

==== Matches ====
Match Day	Date	Opponent	H/A	Score	Carlisle United Scorer(s)	Attendance
1	20 August	Chesterfield	H	1–1		
2	22 August	Halifax Town	A	2–2		
3	27 August	Tranmere Rovers	A	1–0		
4	30 August	Halifax Town	H	2–2		
5	3 September	Southport	H	4–0		
6	6 September	Grimsby Town	A	0–1		
7	10 September	Gateshead	A	3–2		
8	13 September	Grimsby Town	H	0–2		
9	17 September	Darlington	H	2–0		
10	24 September	Accrington Stanley	A	0–1		
11	28 September	Chester	A	3–3		
12	1 October	Barrow	H	2–0		
13	8 October	Scunthorpe & Lindsey United	A	0–4		
14	15 October	Wrexham	H	0–1		
15	22 October	Workington	A	0–4		
16	29 October	York City	H	3–1		
17	5 November	Derby County	A	0–3		
18	12 November	Crewe Alexandra	H	4–1		
19	26 November	Stockport County	H	4–1		
20	3 December	Mansfield Town	A	1–0		
21	17 December	Chesterfield	A	1–2		
22	24 December	Tranmere Rovers	H	0–3		
23	26 December	Rochdale	A	2–5		
24	27 December	Rochdale	H	1–2		
25	31 December	Southport	A	0–3		
26	2 January	Bradford Park Avenue	H	4–1		
27	14 January	Gateshead	H	2–1		
28	21 January	Darlington	A	5–3		
29	28 January	Oldham Athletic	H	3–1		
30	4 February	Accrington Stanley	H	0–4		
31	11 February	Barrow	A	0–0		
32	18 February	Scunthorpe & Lindsey United	H	1–2		
33	25 February	Wrexham	A	2–5		
34	3 March	Workington	H	2–4		
35	10 March	York City	A	1–3		
36	17 March	Hartlepools United	H	0–3		
37	24 March	Crewe Alexandra	A	1–3		
38	30 March	Bradford City	H	0–0		
39	31 March	Derby County	H	0–3		
40	2 April	Bradford City	A	0–0		
41	7 April	Stockport County	A	1–8		
42	12 April	Mansfield Town	H	5–2		
43	21 April	Oldham Athletic	A	2–2		
44	24 April	Chester	H	4–1		
45	28 April	Bradford Park Avenue	A	1–2		
46	30 April	Hartlepools United	A	0–3		

=== FA Cup ===
Round	Date	Opponent	H/A	Score	Carlisle United Scorer(s)	Attendance
R1	19 November	Darlington	A	0–0		
R1 R	22 November	Darlington	H	0–0		
R1 2R	28 November	Darlington	A	1–3		
