= 1954–55 Carlisle United F.C. season =

Carlisle United F.C.
1954–55 season
- Manager: Fred Emery
- Stadium: Brunton Park
- Third Division North: 20th
- FA Cup: First Round
Home colours

For the 1954–55 season, Carlisle United F.C. competed in Football League Third Division North.

== Results & fixtures ==
=== Football League Third Division North ===
==== League table ====
Pos	Team	Pld	W	D	L	GF	GA	GAv	Pts
18	Wrexham	46	13	12	21	65	77	0.844	38
19	Tranmere Rovers	46	13	11	22	55	70	0.786	37
20	Carlisle United	46	15	6	25	78	89	0.876	36
21	Bradford City	46	13	10	23	47	55	0.855	36
22	Crewe Alexandra	46	10	14	22	68	91	0.747	34

Source: rsssf.com

==== Matches ====
Match Day	Date	Opponent	H/A	Score	Carlisle United Scorer(s)	Attendance
1	21 August	Stockport County	A	2–5		
2	24 August	Accrington Stanley	H	1–0		
3	28 August	Hartlepools United	H	3–2		
4	1 September	Accrington Stanley	A	2–3		
5	4 September	Gateshead	A	0–0		
6	6 September	Bradford Park Avenue	A	2–0		
7	11 September	Darlington	H	0–1		
8	14 September	Bradford Park Avenue	H	3–2		
9	18 September	Chesterfield	A	1–2		
10	21 September	Chester	H	1–2		
11	25 September	Crewe Alexandra	H	4–0		
12	29 September	Chester	A	2–1		
13	2 October	Wrexham	A	1–1		
14	9 October	Mansfield Town	H	1–2		
15	16 October	Workington	A	0–1		
16	23 October	Barrow	H	4–0		
17	30 October	Southport	A	1–4		
18	6 November	York City	H	4–5		
19	13 November	Halifax Town	A	3–5		
20	27 November	Bradford City	A	0–2		
21	4 December	Barnsley	H	2–4		
22	18 December	Stockport County	H	3–3		
23	25 December	Rochdale	H	7–2		
24	27 December	Rochdale	A	2–1		
25	1 January	Hartlepools United	A	0–1		
26	29 January	Grimsby Town	H	3–1		
27	5 February	Chesterfield	H	1–2		
28	12 February	Crewe Alexandra	A	1–4		
29	19 February	Wrexham	H	1–0		
30	26 February	Mansfield Town	A	1–1		
31	5 March	Workington	H	0–4		
32	8 March	Grimsby Town	A	0–2		
33	12 March	Barrow	A	1–2		
34	19 March	Southport	H	2–1		
35	2 April	Halifax Town	H	4–0		
36	8 April	Tranmere Rovers	H	1–2		
37	9 April	Oldham Athletic	A	1–2		
38	11 April	Tranmere Rovers	A	1–6		
39	13 April	York City	A	1–2		
40	16 April	Bradford City	H	1–0		
41	18 April	Scunthorpe & Lindsey United	A	1–1		
42	20 April	Darlington	A	1–1		
43	23 April	Barnsley	A	1–3		
44	26 April	Oldham Athletic	H	5–2		
45	30 April	Scunthorpe & Lindsey United	H	1–2		
46	3 May	Gateshead	H	1–2		

=== FA Cup ===
Round	Date	Opponent	H/A	Score	Carlisle United Scorer(s)	Attendance
R1	20 November	Stockport County	A	1–0		
R2	11 December	Watford	H	2–2		
R2 R	15 December	Watford	A	1–4		
