= 1953–54 Carlisle United F.C. season =

Carlisle United F.C.
1953–54 season
- Manager: Fred Emery
- Stadium: Brunton Park
- Third Division North: 13th
- FA Cup: First Round

For the 1953–54 season, Carlisle United F.C. competed in Football League Third Division North.

== Results & fixtures ==
=== Football League Third Division North ===
==== League table ====
Pos	Team	Pld	W	D	L	GF	GA	GAv	Pts
11	Southport	46	17	12	17	63	60	1.050	46
12	Barrow	46	16	12	18	72	71	1.014	44
13	Carlisle United	46	14	15	17	83	71	1.169	43
14	Tranmere Rovers	46	18	7	21	59	70	0.843	43
15	Accrington Stanley	46	16	10	20	66	74	0.892	42

Source: rsssf.com

==== Matches ====
Match Day	Date	Opponent	H/A	Score	Carlisle United Scorer(s)	Attendance
1	22 August	Rochdale	H	7–0		
2	26 August	Grimsby Town	A	2–3		
3	29 August	Wrexham	A	2–4		
4	1 September	Grimsby Town	H	3–3		
5	5 September	Mansfield Town	H	5–0		
6	7 September	Stockport County	A	2–3		
7	12 September	Barrow	A	1–1		
8	15 September	Stockport County	H	2–0		
9	19 September	Bradford City	H	2–0		
10	22 September	Accrington Stanley	H	2–1		
11	26 September	Chesterfield	A	0–5		
12	28 September	Accrington Stanley	A	2–2		
13	3 October	Tranmere Rovers	H	0–2		
14	10 October	Darlington	H	1–1		
15	17 October	Barnsley	A	1–1		
16	24 October	Bradford Park Avenue	H	0–1		
17	31 October	Port Vale	A	0–1		
18	7 November	Crewe Alexandra	H	5–0		
19	14 November	Chester	A	1–0		
20	28 November	York City	A	3–1		
21	5 December	Scunthorpe & Lindsey United	H	5–1		
22	19 December	Rochdale	A	1–2		
23	25 December	Gateshead	A	2–2		
24	26 December	Gateshead	H	2–1		
25	1 January	Workington	H	2–2		
26	2 January	Wrexham	H	0–0		
27	9 January	Workington	A	2–2		
28	16 January	Mansfield Town	A	1–2		
29	23 January	Barrow	H	2–2		
30	30 January	Hartlepools United	H	2–3		
31	6 February	Bradford City	A	0–1		
32	13 February	Chesterfield	H	2–3		
33	20 February	Tranmere Rovers	A	2–1		
34	27 February	Darlington	A	2–3		
35	6 March	Barnsley	H	2–4		
36	13 March	Bradford Park Avenue	A	4–2		
37	20 March	Port Vale	H	0–0		
38	27 March	Crewe Alexandra	A	0–0		
39	3 April	Chester	H	1–1		
40	10 April	Southport	A	0–3		
41	12 April	Hartlepools United	A	1–1		
42	16 April	Halifax Town	H	0–2		
43	17 April	York City	H	1–1		
44	19 April	Halifax Town	A	5–0		
45	24 April	Scunthorpe & Lindsey United	A	1–2		
46	27 April	Southport	H	3–2		

=== FA Cup ===
Round	Date	Opponent	H/A	Score	Carlisle United Scorer(s)	Attendance
R1	21 November	Southport	A	0–1		
