= 1957–58 Carlisle United F.C. season =

Carlisle United F.C.
1957–58 season
- Manager: Fred Emery
- Stadium: Brunton Park
- Third Division North: 16th
- FA Cup: Second Round

For the 1957–58 season, Carlisle United F.C. competed in Football League Third Division North.

== Results & fixtures ==
=== Football League Third Division North ===
==== League table ====
Pos	Team	Pld	W	D	L	GF	GA	GAv	Pts	Promotion or relegation
14	Gateshead	46	15	15	16	68	76	0.895	45	Moved to 4th Division
15	Oldham Athletic	46	14	17	15	72	84	0.857	45	Moved to 4th Division
16	Carlisle United	46	19	6	21	80	78	1.026	44	Moved to 4th Division
17	Hartlepools United	46	16	12	18	73	76	0.961	44	Moved to 4th Division
18	Barrow	46	13	15	18	66	74	0.892	41	Moved to 4th Division

Source: rsssf.com

==== Matches ====
Match Day	Date	Opponent	H/A	Score	Carlisle United Scorer(s)	Attendance
1	24 August	Oldham Athletic	A	0–1		
2	27 August	Mansfield Town	H	3–4		
3	31 August	Bury	H	0–2		
4	2 September	Mansfield Town	A	0–2		
5	7 September	Accrington Stanley	A	2–3		
6	10 September	York City	H	2–1		
7	14 September	Chester	H	3–2		
8	16 September	York City	A	5–0		
9	21 September	Chesterfield	A	3–1		
10	24 September	Southport	A	0–2		
11	28 September	Tranmere Rovers	H	3–1		
12	1 October	Southport	H	4–0		
13	5 October	Hartlepools United	A	1–0		
14	12 October	Hull City	H	0–1		
15	19 October	Darlington	A	2–1		
16	26 October	Scunthorpe & Lindsey United	H	3–4		
17	2 November	Wrexham	A	0–1		
18	9 November	Crewe Alexandra	H	2–0		
19	23 November	Halifax Town	H	2–1		
20	30 November	Stockport County	A	1–4		
21	14 December	Bradford City	A	1–1		
22	21 December	Oldham Athletic	H	1–1		
23	25 December	Workington	H	2–2		
24	26 December	Workington	A	1–2		
25	28 December	Bury	A	0–3		
26	1 January	Bradford Park Avenue	A	1–4		
27	4 January	Bradford Park Avenue	H	2–3		
28	11 January	Accrington Stanley	H	6–1		
29	18 January	Chester	A	0–0		
30	1 February	Chesterfield	H	2–2		
31	8 February	Tranmere Rovers	A	1–0		
32	15 February	Hartlepools United	H	1–2		
33	18 February	Gateshead	H	5–1		
34	22 February	Halifax Town	A	0–5		
35	1 March	Darlington	H	5–2		
36	11 March	Rochdale	A	0–1		
37	15 March	Wrexham	H	4–0		
38	22 March	Hull City	A	0–4		
39	29 March	Rochdale	H	1–0		
40	5 April	Gateshead	A	2–3		
41	7 April	Barrow	A	3–2		
42	12 April	Stockport County	H	3–1		
43	14 April	Barrow	H	2–1		
44	19 April	Crewe Alexandra	A	0–0		
45	26 April	Bradford City	H	0–3		
46	1 May	Scunthorpe & Lindsey United	A	1–3		

=== FA Cup ===
Round	Date	Opponent	H/A	Score	Carlisle United Scorer(s)	Attendance
R1	16 November	Rhyl	H	5–1		
R2	7 December	Accrington Stanley	H	1–1		
R2 R	11 December	Accrington Stanley	A	2–3		
