= 1956–57 Carlisle United F.C. season =

Carlisle United F.C.
1956–57 season
- Manager: Fred Emery
- Stadium: Brunton Park
- Third Division North: 15th
- FA Cup: Third Round

For the 1956–57 season, Carlisle United F.C. competed in Football League Third Division North.

https://www.11v11.com/teams/carlisle-united/tab/matches/season/1957/

== Results & fixtures ==
=== Football League Third Division North ===
==== League table ====
Pos	Team	Pld	W	D	L	GF	GA	GAv	Pts
13	Rochdale	46	18	12	16	65	65	1.000	48
14	Scunthorpe & Lindsey United	46	15	15	16	71	69	1.029	45
15	Carlisle United	46	16	13	17	76	85	0.894	45
16	Mansfield Town	46	17	10	19	91	90	1.011	44
17	Gateshead	46	17	10	19	72	90	0.800	44

Source: rsssf.com

==== Matches ====
Match Day	Date	Opponent	H/A	Score	Carlisle United Scorer(s)	Attendance
1	18 August	Oldham Athletic	H	2–2		
2	22 August	Darlington	A	1–0		
3	25 August	Mansfield Town	A	1–5		
4	1 September	Mansfield Town	H	1–2		
5	3 September	York City	A	0–2		
6	8 September	Chesterfield	A	2–2		
7	15 September	Chester	H	3–0		
8	17 September	Stockport County	A	0–2		
9	22 September	Hartlepools United	A	1–2		
10	25 September	Stockport County	H	3–3		
11	29 September	Bradford City	H	1–4		
12	6 October	Bradford Park Avenue	H	2–1		
13	9 October	Darlington	H	1–2		
14	13 October	Gateshead	A	2–4		
15	20 October	Workington	H	1–1		
16	27 October	Derby County	A	0–3		
17	3 November	Crewe Alexandra	H	2–1		
18	9 November	Scunthorpe & Lindsey United	A	2–1		
19	24 November	Halifax Town	A	3–1		
20	1 December	Wrexham	H	2–2		
21	15 December	Oldham Athletic	A	2–2		
22	22 December	Mansfield Town	H	6–1		
23	25 December	Barrow	H	1–1		
24	26 December	Barrow	A	0–3		
25	29 December	Southport	A	1–4		
26	1 January	York City	H	2–0		
27	12 January	Chesterfield	H	4–2		
28	19 January	Chester	A	2–1		
29	26 January	Accrington Stanley	A	2–1		
30	2 February	Hartlepools United	H	2–1		
31	9 February	Bradford City	A	2–3		
32	16 February	Bradford Park Avenue	A	3–1		
33	23 February	Gateshead	H	3–2		
34	2 March	Workington	A	0–2		
35	9 March	Derby County	H	1–3		
36	16 March	Crewe Alexandra	A	2–2		
37	19 March	Accrington Stanley	H	2–2		
38	23 March	Scunthorpe & Lindsey United	H	0–0		
39	30 March	Rochdale	A	1–2		
40	6 April	Halifax Town	H	0–0		
41	9 April	Hull City	H	1–3		
42	13 April	Wrexham	A	4–6		
43	19 April	Tranmere Rovers	H	2–2		
44	22 April	Tranmere Rovers	A	1–0		
45	27 May	Hull City	A	0–0		
46	19 April	Rochdale	H	2–1		

=== FA Cup ===
Round	Date	Opponent	H/A	Score	Carlisle United Scorer(s)	Attendance
R1	17 November	Billingham Synthonia	H	6–1		
R2	8 December	Darlington	H	2–1		
R3	5 January	Birmingham City	H	3–3		27,445
R3 R	9 January	Birmingham City	A	0–4		56,458
