= 1952–53 Carlisle United F.C. season =

Carlisle United F.C.
1952–53 season
- Manager: Fred Emery
- Stadium: Brunton Park
- Third Division North: 9th
- FA Cup: First Round

For the 1952–53 season, Carlisle United F.C. competed in Football League Third Division North.

== Results & fixtures ==
=== Football League Third Division North ===
==== League table ====
Pos	Team	Pld	W	D	L	GF	GA	GAv	Pts
7	Bradford Park Avenue	46	19	12	15	75	61	1.230	50
8	Gateshead	46	17	15	14	76	60	1.267	49
9	Carlisle United	46	18	13	15	82	68	1.206	49
10	Crewe Alexandra	46	20	8	18	70	68	1.029	48
11	Stockport County	46	17	13	16	82	69	1.188	47

Source: rsssf.com

==== Matches ====
Match Day	Date	Opponent	H/A	Score	Carlisle United Scorer(s)	Attendance
1	23 August	Gateshead	A	0–2		
2	27 August	Accrington Stanley	A	0–1		
3	30 August	Hartlepools United	H	4–1		
4	4 September	Accrington Stanley	H	4–4		
5	6 September	Workington	A	1–1		
6	11 September	Darlington	H	4–2		
7	13 September	Southport	A	0–2		
8	17 September	Darlington	A	0–0		
9	20 September	Crewe Alexandra	H	1–2		
10	25 September	Grimsby Town	H	3–0		
11	27 September	Port Vale	A	0–0		
12	29 September	Stockport County	A	0–3		
13	4 October	Chester	H	1–1		
14	11 October	Halifax Town	H	1–2		
15	18 October	Mansfield Town	A	1–2		
16	25 October	Oldham Athletic	H	0–0		
17	1 November	Bradford Park Avenue	A	2–2		
18	8 November	Wrexham	H	2–0		
19	15 November	Barrow	A	0–0		
20	29 November	York City	A	0–1		
21	6 December	Workington	H	3–1		
22	13 December	Chesterfield	A	2–4		
23	20 December	Gateshead	H	2–2		
24	25 December	Scunthorpe & Lindsey United	H	8–0		
25	27 December	Scunthorpe & Lindsey United	A	2–1		
26	1 January	Stockport County	H	2–1		
27	3 January	Hartlepools United	A	0–1		
28	10 January	Rochdale	H	5–0		
29	24 January	Southport	H	2–0		
30	31 January	Rochdale	A	2–1		
31	7 February	Crewe Alexandra	A	2–2		
32	14 February	Port Vale	H	2–0		
33	21 February	Chester	A	2–1		
34	28 February	Halifax Town	A	1–2		
35	7 March	Mansfield Town	H	1–0		
36	12 March	Tranmere Rovers	H	4–0		
37	14 March	Oldham Athletic	A	4–2		
38	21 March	Bradford Park Avenue	H	1–3		
39	28 March	Wrexham	A	0–3		
40	3 April	Bradford City	H	4–4		
41	4 April	Barrow	H	0–0		
42	7 April	Bradford City	A	2–7		
43	11 April	Grimsby Town	A	3–2		
44	18 April	York City	H	1–1		
45	25 April	Tranmere Rovers	A	1–4		
46	30 April	Chesterfield	H	3–0		

=== FA Cup ===
Round	Date	Opponent	H/A	Score	Carlisle United Scorer(s)	Attendance
R1	22 November	Scunthorpe & Lindsey United	A	0–1		
