= 1951–52 Carlisle United F.C. season =

Carlisle United F.C.
1951–52 season
- Manager: Fred Emery
- Stadium: Brunton Park
- Third Division North: 7th
- FA Cup: First round
Home colours

For the 1951–52 season, Carlisle United F.C. competed in Football League Third Division North.

== Results & fixtures ==
=== Football League Third Division North ===
==== League table ====
Pos	Team	Pld	W	D	L	GF	GA	GAv	Pts
5	Gateshead	46	21	11	14	66	49	1.347	53
6	Mansfield Town	46	22	8	16	73	60	1.217	52
7	Carlisle United	46	19	13	14	62	57	1.088	51
8	Bradford Park Avenue	46	19	12	15	74	64	1.156	50
9	Hartlepools United	46	21	8	17	71	65	1.092	50

Source: rsssf.com

==== Matches ====
Match Day	Date	Opponent	H/A	Score	Carlisle United Scorer(s)	Attendance
1	18 August	Rochdale	A	4–0		
2	23 August	Halifax Town	H	2–2		
3	25 August	Accrington Stanley	H	4–1		
4	1 September	Crewe Alexandra	A	1–1		
5	6 September	Bradford Park Avenue	H	1–0		
6	8 September	Stockport County	A	1–1		
7	10 September	Halifax Town	A	2–1		
8	15 September	Workington	H	0–1		
9	17 September	Bradford Park Avenue	A	1–0		
10	22 September	Barrow	A	1–0		
11	29 September	Grimsby Town	H	1–2		
12	6 October	Darlington	H	1–1		
13	13 October	Oldham Athletic	A	0–2		
14	20 October	Hartlepools United	H	2–1		
15	27 October	Bradford City	A	2–1		
16	3 November	York City	H	2–1		
17	10 November	Chester	A	2–4		
18	17 November	Lincoln City	H	1–4		
19	1 December	Tranmere Rovers	H	1–0		
20	8 December	Southport	A	1–2		
21	22 December	Accrington Stanley	A	2–0		
22	25 December	Gateshead	A	1–1		
23	26 December	Gateshead	H	0–0		
24	29 December	Crewe Alexandra	H	2–0		
25	1 January	Chesterfield	H	2–3		
26	5 January	Stockport County	H	2–1		
27	12 January	Mansfield Town	A	2–1		
28	19 January	Workington	A	2–1		
29	26 January	Barrow	H	0–1		
30	2 February	Mansfield Town	H	0–0		
31	9 February	Grimsby Town	A	1–4		
32	16 February	Darlington	A	2–1		
33	23 February	Chesterfield	A	0–3		
34	1 March	Oldham Athletic	H	3–3		
35	6 March	Rochdale	H	1–1		
36	8 March	Hartlepools United	A	0–1		
37	15 March	Bradford City	H	1–0		
38	22 March	York City	A	0–0		
39	29 March	Chester	H	0–0		
40	5 April	Lincoln City	A	2–2		
41	11 April	Wrexham	H	2–0		
42	12 April	Scunthorpe & Lindsey United	H	3–0		
43	14 April	Wrexham	A	1–3		
44	19 April	Tranmere Rovers	A	2–3		
45	24 April	Scunthorpe & Lindsey United	A	1–1		
46	26 April	Southport	H	0–2		

=== FA Cup ===
Round	Date	Opponent	H/A	Score	Carlisle United Scorer(s)	Attendance
R1	24 November	Bradford City	A	0–1		
