= 1950–51 Carlisle United F.C. season =

Carlisle United F.C.
1950–51 season
- Manager: Bill Shankly
- Stadium: Brunton Park
- Third Division North: 3rd
- FA Cup: Third round

For the 1950–51 season, Carlisle United F.C. competed in Football League Third Division North.

== Results & fixtures ==
=== Football League Third Division North ===
==== League table ====
Pos	Team	Pld	W	D	L	GF	GA	GAv	Pts	Promotion or relegation
1	Rotherham United	46	31	9	6	103	41	2.512	71	Division Champions, promoted
2	Mansfield Town	46	26	12	8	78	48	1.625	64	
3	Carlisle United	46	25	12	9	79	50	1.580	62	
4	Tranmere Rovers	46	24	11	11	83	62	1.339	59	
5	Lincoln City	46	25	8	13	89	58	1.534	58	

Source: rsssf.com

==== Matches ====
Match Day	Date	Opponent	H/A	Score	Carlisle United Scorer(s)	Attendance
1	19 August	Southport	A	0–1		
2	24 August	Gateshead	H	3–0		
3	26 August	Tranmere Rovers	H	3–1		
4	28 August	Gateshead	A	3–4		
5	2 September	Bradford Park Avenue	A	2–0		
6	7 September	Hartlepools United	H	1–0		
7	9 September	Oldham Athletic	H	1–0		
8	11 September	Hartlepools United	A	3–3		
9	16 September	Wrexham	A	1–2		
10	23 September	Scunthorpe & Lindsey United	H	3–1		
11	30 September	Mansfield Town	A	1–2		
12	7 October	Chester	A	2–2		
13	14 October	Shrewsbury Town	H	2–2		
14	21 October	Bradford City	A	4–2		
15	28 October	Rochdale	H	4–0		
16	4 November	Crewe Alexandra	A	1–1		
17	11 November	New Brighton	H	1–0		
18	18 November	Lincoln City	A	1–1		
19	2 December	Stockport County	A	2–1		
20	16 December	Southport	H	3–1		
21	23 December	Tranmere Rovers	A	2–2		
22	25 December	Accrington Stanley	H	3–1		
23	26 December	Accrington Stanley	A	4–0		
24	30 December	Bradford Park Avenue	H	1–0		
25	1 January	Barrow	H	1–1		
26	13 January	Oldham Athletic	A	1–1		
27	20 January	Wrexham	H	0–2		
28	27 January	York City	A	1–1		
29	3 February	Scunthorpe & Lindsey United	A	1–1		
30	10 February	Barrow	A	2–1		
31	17 February	Mansfield Town	H	2–0		
32	24 February	Chester	H	2–1		
33	3 March	Shrewsbury Town	A	3–0		
34	10 March	Bradford City	H	2–1		
35	17 March	Rochdale	A	1–4		
36	23 March	Rotherham United	H	1–1		
37	24 March	Crewe Alexandra	H	2–1		
38	26 March	Rotherham United	A	0–3		
39	31 March	New Brighton	A	1–0		
40	7 April	Lincoln City	H	2–0		
41	14 April	Darlington	A	0–1		
42	19 April	Darlington	H	2–1		
43	21 April	Stockport County	H	2–2		
44	26 April	Halifax Town	H	1–0		
45	28 April	Halifax Town	A	0–1		
46	3 May	York City	H	3–2		

=== FA Cup ===
Round	Date	Opponent	H/A	Score	Carlisle United Scorer(s)	Attendance
R1	25 November	Barrow	H	2–1		
R2	9 December	Southport	A	3–1		
R3	6 January	Arsenal	A	0–0		
R3 R	11 January	Arsenal	H	1–4		
