= 1949–50 Carlisle United F.C. season =

Carlisle United F.C.
1949–50 season
- Manager: Bill Shankly
- Stadium: Brunton Park
- Third Division North: 9th
- FA Cup: Third round
Home colours

For the 1949–50 season, Carlisle United F.C. competed in Football League Third Division North.

== Results & fixtures ==
=== Football League Third Division North ===
==== League table ====
Pos	Team	Pld	W	D	L	GF	GA	GAv	Pts
7	Crewe Alexandra	42	17	14	11	68	55	1.236	48
8	Mansfield Town	42	18	12	12	66	54	1.222	48
9	Carlisle United	42	16	15	11	68	51	1.333	47
10	Stockport County	42	19	7	16	55	52	1.058	45
11	Oldham Athletic	42	16	11	15	58	63	0.921	43

Source: rsssf.com

==== Matches ====
Match Day	Date	Opponent	H/A	Score	Carlisle United Scorer(s)	Attendance
1	20 August	Accrington Stanley	H	2–1		
2	24 August	Wrexham	A	1–1		
3	27 August	Mansfield Town	A	1–4		
4	1 September	Wrexham	H	1–0		
5	3 September	Stockport County	H	2–0		
6	6 September	Tranmere Rovers	A	0–0		
7	10 September	Rotherham United	H	3–1		
8	17 September	Lincoln City	A	1–2		
9	24 September	Barrow	H	2–0		
10	1 October	Crewe Alexandra	A	1–2		
11	8 October	Doncaster Rovers	A	0–0		
12	15 October	Gateshead	H	4–2		
13	22 October	Hartlepools United	A	5–1		
14	29 October	Darlington	H	0–1		
15	5 November	New Brighton	A	2–3		
16	12 November	Halifax Town	H	0–2		
17	19 November	Rochdale	A	0–1		
18	3 December	Chester	A	4–2		
19	17 December	Accrington Stanley	A	1–1		
20	24 December	Mansfield Town	H	1–1		
21	26 December	York City	A	1–1		
22	27 December	York City	H	4–3		
23	31 December	Stockport County	A	0–2		
24	14 January	Rotherham United	A	1–1		
25	21 January	Lincoln City	H	0–2		
26	28 January	Bradford City	H	3–0		
27	4 February	Barrow	A	3–1		
28	11 February	Southport	H	3–3		
29	18 February	Crewe Alexandra	H	2–2		
30	25 February	Rochdale	H	2–0		
31	4 March	Bradford City	A	2–3		
32	11 March	Hartlepools United	H	2–1		
33	18 March	Darlington	A	1–1		
34	25 March	New Brighton	H	0–0		
35	1 April	Halifax Town	A	1–1		
36	7 April	Oldham Athletic	H	3–0		
37	8 April	Doncaster Rovers	H	0–0		
38	10 April	Oldham Athletic	A	1–1		
39	15 April	Gateshead	A	1–2		
40	22 April	Chester	H	5–1		
41	29 April	Southport	A	2–1		
42	6 May	Tranmere Rovers	H	0–0		

=== FA Cup ===
Round	Date	Opponent	H/A	Score	Carlisle United Scorer(s)	Attendance
R1	26 November	Lincoln City	H	1–0		
R2	10 December	Swindon Town	H	2–0		
R3	7 January	Leeds United	H	2–5		
