= 1960–61 Carlisle United F.C. season =

Carlisle United F.C.
1960–61 season
- Manager: Ivor Powell
- Stadium: Brunton Park
- Fourth Division: 19th
- FA Cup: Second Round
- League Cup: First Round

For the 1960–61 season, Carlisle United F.C. competed in Football League Division Four.

== Results & fixtures ==
=== Football League Fourth Division ===
==== League table ====
Pos	Team	Pld	W	D	L	GF	GA	GAv	Pts	Promotion or relegation
17	Rochdale	46	17	8	21	60	66	0.909	42	
18	Accrington Stanley	46	16	8	22	74	88	0.841	40	
19	Carlisle United	46	13	13	20	61	79	0.772	39	
20	Mansfield Town	46	16	6	24	71	78	0.910	38	
21	Exeter City	46	14	10	22	66	94	0.702	38	Re-elected

Source: rsssf.com

==== Matches ====
Match Day	Date	Opponent	H/A	Score	Carlisle United Scorer(s)	Attendance
1	20 August	Exeter City	A	0–0		
2	23 August	Stockport County	H	1–4		
3	27 August	Peterborough United	H	3–3		
4	29 August	Stockport County	A	0–2		
5	3 September	Southport	A	0–3		
6	6 September	Rochdale	H	1–2		
7	10 September	Darlington	H	4–4		
8	13 September	Rochdale	A	1–2		
9	17 September	Crystal Palace	A	1–1		
10	19 September	Mansfield Town	A	3–1		
11	24 September	Doncaster Rovers	H	2–1		
12	27 September	Mansfield Town	H	3–1		
13	1 October	Hartlepools United	A	1–0		
14	5 October	Wrexham	A	1–2		
15	8 October	Crewe Alexandra	H	0–1		
16	15 October	York City	A	0–4		
17	22 October	Accrington Stanley	H	3–1		
18	29 October	Millwall	A	2–4		
19	12 November	Gillingham	A	1–1		
20	19 November	Bradford Park Avenue	H	2–2		
21	3 December	Aldershot	H	2–2		
22	10 December	Oldham Athletic	A	2–5		
23	17 December	Exeter City	H	2–2		
24	26 December	Workington	A	1–2		
25	27 December	Workington	H	2–4		
26	31 December	Peterborough United	A	0–5		
27	2 January	Gillingham	H	1–3		
28	14 January	Southport	H	1–0		
29	21 January	Darlington	A	0–0		
30	28 January	Barrow	H	1–0		
31	4 February	Crystal Palace	H	2–0		
32	11 February	Doncaster Rovers	A	0–1		
33	18 February	Hartlepools United	H	2–2		
34	25 February	Crewe Alexandra	A	0–3		
35	4 March	York City	H	1–1		
36	11 March	Accrington Stanley	A	0–1		
37	18 March	Millwall	H	1–2		
38	21 March	Northampton Town	A	0–0		
39	25 March	Barrow	A	2–0		
40	31 March	Chester	H	3–1		
41	3 April	Chester	A	2–3		
42	8 April	Bradford Park Avenue	A	0–0		
43	11 April	Wrexham	H	1–0		
44	15 April	Northampton Town	H	2–1		
45	22 April	Aldershot	A	1–2		
46	29 April	Oldham Athletic	H	3–0		

=== Football League Cup ===
Round	Date	Opponent	H/A	Score	Carlisle United Scorer(s)	Attendance
R1	10 October	Stockport County	A	0–2		

=== FA Cup ===
Round	Date	Opponent	H/A	Score	Carlisle United Scorer(s)	Attendance
R1	5 November	Chester	A	1–0		
R2	26 November	Port Vale	A	1–2		
