= 1959–60 Carlisle United F.C. season =

Carlisle United F.C.
1959–60 season
- Manager: Andy Beattie
- Stadium: Brunton Park
- Fourth Division: 19th
- FA Cup: First Round

For the 1959–60 season, Carlisle United F.C. competed in Football League Division Four.

== Results & fixtures ==
=== Football League Fourth Division ===
==== League table ====
Pos	Team	Pld	W	D	L	GF	GA	GAv	Pts	Promotion or relegation
17	Doncaster Rovers	46	16	10	20	69	76	0.908	42	
18	Barrow	46	15	11	20	77	87	0.885	41	
19	Carlisle United	46	15	11	20	51	66	0.773	41	
20	Chester	46	14	12	20	59	77	0.766	40	
21	Southport	46	10	14	22	48	92	0.522	34	Re-elected

Source: rsssf.com

==== Matches ====
Match Day	Date	Opponent	H/A	Score	Carlisle United Scorer(s)	Attendance
1	22 August	Crystal Palace	H	2–2		
2	26 August	Chester	A	1–0		
3	29 August	Bradford Park Avenue	A	1–1		
4	1 September	Chester	H	2–1		
5	5 September	Stockport County	H	0–4		
6	10 September	Walsall	A	1–0		
7	12 September	Exeter City	A	3–1		
8	15 September	Walsall	H	1–1		
9	19 September	Watford	H	1–0		
10	23 September	Crewe Alexandra	A	0–3		
11	26 September	Oldham Athletic	A	1–0		
12	29 September	Crewe Alexandra	H	4–2		
13	3 October	Rochdale	A	0–3		
14	6 October	Notts County	H	2–0		
15	10 October	Doncaster Rovers	H	2–0		
16	15 October	Notts County	A	1–2		
17	17 October	Northampton Town	A	2–2		
18	24 October	Torquay United	H	2–0		
19	31 October	Millwall	A	1–1		
20	7 November	Southport	H	1–0		
21	21 November	Barrow	H	0–1		
22	28 November	Aldershot	A	2–0		
23	12 December	Gateshead	A	0–1		
24	19 December	Crystal Palace	A	1–2		
25	26 December	Workington	A	0–1		
26	29 December	Workington	H	0–1		
27	2 January	Bradford Park Avenue	H	1–3		
28	16 January	Stockport County	A	0–0		
29	23 January	Exeter City	H	0–4		
30	30 January	Darlington	H	1–0		
31	6 February	Watford	A	1–3		
32	13 February	Oldham Athletic	H	0–1		
33	27 February	Doncaster Rovers	A	1–4		
34	5 March	Northampton Town	H	0–2		
35	12 March	Torquay United	A	1–2		
36	19 March	Millwall	H	3–3		
37	26 March	Southport	A	1–1		
38	29 March	Rochdale	H	1–1		
39	2 April	Gillingham	H	0–1		
40	9 April	Barrow	A	1–5		
41	15 April	Hartlepools United	H	1–1		
42	18 April	Hartlepools United	A	2–1		
43	19 April	Aldershot	H	0–0		
44	23 April	Darlington	A	1–2		
45	30 April	Gateshead	H	4–0		
46	6 May	Gillingham	A	1–3		

=== FA Cup ===
Round	Date	Opponent	H/A	Score	Carlisle United Scorer(s)	Attendance
R1	5 November	Rochdale	A	2–2		
R1 R	26 November	Rochdale	H	1–3		
