= 1931–32 Carlisle United F.C. season =

Carlisle United F.C.
1931–32 season
- Manager: Billy Hampson
- Stadium: Brunton Park
- Third Division North: 18th
- FA Cup: Second round

For the 1931–32 season, Carlisle United F.C. competed in Football League Third Division North.

== Results & fixtures ==
=== Football League Third Division North ===
==== League table ====
Pos	Team	Pld	W	D	L	GF	GA	GAv	Pts
16	Walsall (Note: Walsall was transferred from Third Division South for this season.)	40	16	3	21	57	85	0.671	35
17	Halifax Town	40	13	8	19	61	87	0.701	34
18	Carlisle United	40	11	11	18	64	79	0.810	33
19	Rotherham United	40	14	4	22	63	72	0.875	32
20	New Brighton	40	8	8	24	38	76	0.500	24

Source: rsssf.com

==== Matches ====
Match Day	Date	Opponent	H/A	Score	Carlisle United Scorer(s)	Attendance
1	29 August	Hartlepools United	A	2–2		
2	2 September	Accrington Stanley	A	3–5		
3	5 September	Crewe Alexandra	H	2–1		
4	10 September	Wrexham	H	2–2		
5	12 September	Rochdale	A	3–4		
6	14 September	Wrexham	A	0–1		
7	19 September	Doncaster Rovers	H	5–1		
8	26 September	Southport	A	0–2		
9	3 October	York City	H	1–1		
10	10 October	Tranmere Rovers	A	0–3		
11	17 October	Wigan Borough	A	2–3		
12	24 October	Darlington	H	0–2		
13	31 October	Halifax Town	A	1–1		
14	7 November	Walsall	H	4–0		
15	14 November	Gateshead	A	0–4		
16	21 November	New Brighton	H	0–0		
17	5 December	Hull City	H	0–1		
18	19 December	Chester	H	4–3		
19	25 December	Stockport County	A	0–0		
20	26 December	Stockport County	H	1–1		
21	1 January	Tranmere Rovers	H	1–1		
22	2 January	Hartlepools United	H	3–2		
23	9 January	Barrow	A	1–4		
24	16 January	Crewe Alexandra	A	1–5		
25	23 January	Rochdale	H	4–0		
26	30 January	Doncaster Rovers	A	3–3		
27	6 February	Southport	H	2–2		
28	13 February	York City	A	4–2		
29	24 February	Lincoln City	A	1–3		
30	5 March	Darlington	A	1–0		
31	12 March	Halifax Town	H	4–0		
32	19 March	Walsall	A	1–3		
33	25 March	Rotherham United	H	1–2		
34	26 March	Gateshead	H	0–0		
35	28 March	Rotherham United	A	1–4		
36	2 April	New Brighton	A	1–4		
37	9 April	Barrow	H	3–1		
38	16 April	Hull City	A	0–2		
39	23 April	Lincoln City	H	0–3		
40	30 April	Chester	A	1–4		
41	7 May	Accrington Stanley	H	3–0		

=== FA Cup ===
Round	Date	Opponent	H/A	Score	Carlisle United Scorer(s)	Attendance
R1	28 November	Yorkshire Amateur	A	3–1		
R2	12 December	Darlington	H	0–2		
