= 1946–47 Carlisle United F.C. season =

Carlisle United F.C.
1946–47 season
- Manager: Ivor Broadis
- Stadium: Brunton Park
- Third Division North: 16th
- FA Cup: Third round
Home colours

For the 1946–47 season, Carlisle United F.C. competed in Football League Third Division North.

== Results & fixtures ==
=== Football League Third Division North ===
==== League table ====
Pos	Team	Pld	W	D	L	GF	GA	GAv	Pts
14	Gateshead	42	16	6	20	62	72	0.861	38
15	York City	42	14	9	19	67	81	0.827	37
16	Carlisle United	42	14	9	19	70	93	0.753	37
17	Darlington	42	15	6	21	68	80	0.850	36
18	New Brighton	42	14	8	20	57	77	0.740	36

Source: rsssf.com

==== Matches ====
Match Day	Date	Opponent	H/A	Score	Carlisle United Scorer(s)	Attendance
1	31 August	Oldham Athletic	A	2–0		
2	7 September	Stockport County	H	1–1		
3	14 September	Wrexham	A	1–2		
4	19 September	Bradford City	H	4–3		
5	21 September	Doncaster Rovers	H	2–3		
6	24 September	Accrington Stanley	A	3–4		
7	28 September	Rochdale	A	0–6		
8	5 October	New Brighton	H	3–2		
9	12 October	Halifax Town	A	1–0		
10	19 October	Gateshead	A	3–1		
11	26 October	Hartlepools United	H	5–1		
12	2 November	Crewe Alexandra	H	0–2		
13	9 November	Lincoln City	H	1–0		
14	16 November	Southport	A	2–0		
15	23 November	Rotherham United	H	1–1		
16	7 December	York City	H	1–2		
17	21 December	Darlington	H	1–5		
18	25 December	Barrow	H	2–1		
19	26 December	Barrow	A	1–3		
20	28 December	Oldham Athletic	H	1–2		
21	1 January	Accrington Stanley	H	4–2		
22	4 January	Stockport County	A	0–2		
23	25 January	Doncaster Rovers	A	2–9		
24	1 February	Rochdale	H	1–3		
25	15 February	Halifax Town	H	1–0		
26	22 February	Gateshead	H	3–1		
27	1 March	Hartlepool United	A	1–4		
28	8 March	Crewe Alexandra	H	3–3		
29	15 March	Lincoln City	A	1–3		
30	22 March	Southport	H	1–1		
31	29 March	Rotherham United	A	0–4		
32	4 April	Hull City	H	0–2		
33	5 April	Chester	H	3–2		
34	7 April	Hull City	A	0–2		
35	12 April	York City	A	2–2		
36	19 April	Tranmere Rovers	H	4–2		
37	26 April	Darlington	A	1–2		
38	3 May	Bradford City	A	2–2		
39	10 May	Wrexham	H	1–1		
40	24 May	Tranmere Rovers	A	1–1		
41	26 May	New Brighton	A	2–2		
42	31 May	Chester	A	0–4		

=== FA Cup ===
Round	Date	Opponent	H/A	Score	Carlisle United Scorer(s)	Attendance
R1	30 November	Runcorn	H	4–0		
R2	14 December	South Liverpool	A	3–2		
R3	11 January	Sheffield United	A	0–3		
