= 1932–33 Carlisle United F.C. season =

Carlisle United F.C.
1932–33 season
- Manager: Billy Hampson
- Stadium: Brunton Park
- Third Division North: 19th
- FA Cup: Second round

For the 1932–33 season, Carlisle United F.C. competed in Football League Third Division North.

== Results & fixtures ==
=== Football League Third Division North ===
==== League table ====
Pos	Team	Pld	W	D	L	GF	GA	GAv	Pts	Promotion
17	Rotherham United	42	14	6	22	60	84	0.714	34	
18	Rochdale	42	13	7	22	58	80	0.725	33	
19	Carlisle United	42	13	7	22	51	75	0.680	33	
20	York City	42	13	6	23	72	92	0.783	32	
21	New Brighton	42	11	10	21	63	88	0.716	32	Re-elected

Source: rsssf.com

==== Matches ====
Match Day	Date	Opponent	H/A	Score	Carlisle United Scorer(s)	Attendance
1	27 August	Rochdale	A	1–0		
2	1 September	Crewe Alexandra	H	2–0		
3	3 September	Southport	H	0–0		
4	5 September	Crewe Alexandra	A	0–1		
5	10 September	Mansfield Town	A	1–3		
6	17 September	Rotherham United	H	0–0		
7	24 September	Accrington Stanley	A	1–3		
8	29 September	Stockport County	H	2–1		
9	1 October	New Brighton	A	1–3		
10	8 October	Chester	A	0–4		
11	15 October	Barrow	H	0–1		
12	22 October	Walsall	H	1–1		
13	29 October	Wrexham	A	1–2		
14	5 November	Tranmere Rovers	H	0–1		
15	12 November	Halifax Town	A	1–0		
16	19 November	Hartlepools United	H	3–1		
17	3 December	Hull City	H	1–1		
18	24 December	Stockport County	A	1–0		
19	26 December	Gateshead	H	1–2		
20	27 December	Gateshead	A	0–1		
21	31 December	Rochdale	H	2–2		
22	2 January	Barnsley	A	1–4		
23	7 January	Southport	A	0–4		
24	21 January	Mansfield Town	H	3–1		
25	28 January	Rotherham United	A	0–1		
26	4 February	Accrington Stanley	H	2–2		
27	11 February	New Brighton	A	0–2		
28	18 February	Chester	H	1–1		
29	25 February	Barrow	A	1–2		
30	4 March	Walsall	A	0–5		
31	11 March	Wrexham	H	2–1		
32	18 March	Tranmere Rovers	A	2–1		
33	25 March	Halifax Town	H	5–3		
34	1 April	Hartlepools United	A	1–2		
35	8 April	Barnsley	H	0–1		
36	14 April	York City	H	5–1		
37	15 April	Hull City	A	1–6		
38	17 April	York City	A	1–0		
39	22 April	Doncaster Rovers	H	0–2		
40	27 April	Darlington	H	3–0		
41	29 April	Darlington	A	2–5		
42	4 May	Doncaster Rovers	A	2–4		

=== FA Cup ===
Round	Date	Opponent	H/A	Score	Carlisle United Scorer(s)	Attendance
R1	26 November	Denaby United	H	1–0		
R2	10 December	Hull City	H	1–1		
R2 R	15 December	Hull City	A	1–2		
