= 1938–39 Carlisle United F.C. season =

Carlisle United F.C.
1938–39 season
- Manager: David Taylor
- Stadium: Brunton Park
- Third Division North: 19th
- FA Cup: First round
Home colours

For the 1938–39 season, Carlisle United F.C. competed in Football League Third Division North.

== Results & fixtures ==
=== Football League Third Division North ===
==== League table ====
Pos	Team	Pld	W	D	L	GF	GA	GAv	Pts	Promotion or relegation
17	Lincoln City	42	12	9	21	66	92	0.717	33	
18	Darlington	42	13	7	22	62	92	0.674	33	
19	Carlisle United	42	13	7	22	66	111	0.595	33	
20	York City	42	12	8	22	64	92	0.696	32	
21	Hartlepools United	42	12	7	23	55	94	0.585	31	Re-elected

Source: rsssf.com

==== Matches ====
Match Day	Date	Opponent	H/A	Score	Carlisle United Scorer(s)	Attendance
1	27 August	Hartlepool United	H	2–0		
2	30 August	Rochdale	A	3–2		
3	3 September	Darlington	A	1–2		
4	8 September	Gateshead	H	2–2		
5	10 September	Hull City	H	1–2		
6	17 September	Crewe Alexandra	H	1–0		
7	24 September	Southport	A	1–7		
8	1 October	Doncaster Rovers	H	2–3		
9	8 October	Rotherham United	A	0–4		
10	15 October	Lincoln City	A	1–2		
11	22 October	Stockport County	H	3–2		
12	29 October	Accrington Stanley	A	1–1		
13	5 November	Barnsley	H	3–1		
14	12 November	Oldham Athletic	A	0–6		
15	19 November	Halifax Town	H	1–2		
16	3 December	Barrow	H	3–0		
17	10 December	New Brighton	A	3–2		
18	17 December	Bradford City	H	0–2		
19	24 December	Hartlepools United	A	1–2		
20	26 December	Wrexham	A	5–2		
21	27 December	Wrexham	H	1–1		
22	31 December	Darlington	H	1–1		
23	14 January	Hull City	A	1–11		
24	21 January	Crewe Alexandra	A	1–7		
25	28 January	Southport	H	1–1		
26	4 February	Doncaster Rovers	A	0–1		
27	11 February	Rotherham United	H	3–1		
28	18 February	Lincoln City	H	4–3		
29	25 February	Stockport County	A	0–3		
30	1 March	Chester	A	1–6		
31	4 March	Accrington Stanley	H	6–4		
32	11 March	Barnsley	A	0–3		
33	18 March	Oldham Athletic	H	2–0		
34	25 March	Halifax Town	A	1–5		
35	1 April	New Brighton	H	1–1		
36	7 April	York City	H	1–3		
37	8 April	Barrow	A	0–5		
38	10 April	York City	A	1–4		
39	15 April	Chester	H	1–3		
40	22 April	Bradford City	A	0–2		
41	29 April	New Brighton	H	5–1		
42	6 May	Gateshead	A	1–1		

=== FA Cup ===
Round	Date	Opponent	H/A	Score	Carlisle United Scorer(s)	Attendance
R1	26 November	Walsall	A	1–4		
