= 1961–62 Carlisle United F.C. season =

Carlisle United F.C.
1961–62 season
- Manager: Ivor Powell
- Stadium: Brunton Park
- Fourth Division: 4th
- FA Cup: Third Round
- League Cup: First Round

For the 1961–62 season, Carlisle United F.C. competed in Football League Division Four.

== Results & fixtures ==
=== Football League Fourth Division ===
==== League table ====
Pos	Team	Pld	W	D	L	GF	GA	GAv	Pts	Promotion or relegation
2	Colchester United (P)	44	23	9	12	104	71	1.465	55	Promotion to the Third Division
3	Wrexham (P)	44	22	9	13	96	56	1.714	53	Promotion to the Third Division
4	Carlisle United (P)	44	22	8	14	64	63	1.016	52	Promotion to the Third Division
5	Bradford City	44	21	9	14	94	86	1.093	51	
6	York City	44	20	10	14	84	53	1.585	50	

Source: rsssf.com
(P) Promoted

==== Matches ====
Match Day	Date	Opponent	H/A	Score	Carlisle United Scorer(s)	Attendance
1	19 August	Aldershot	H	2–1		
2	21 August	Colchester United	A	0–2		
3	26 August	Stockport County	A	2–1		
4	29 August	Colchester United	H	1–1		
5	2 September	Oldham Athletic	H	2–0		
6	9 September	Accrington Stanley	A	0–1		
7	12 September	Chester	A	1–1		
8	16 September	Darlington	H	1–0		
9	18 September	York City	A	1–1		
10	23 September	Hartlepools United	A	3–0		
11	27 September	York City	H	3–2		
12	30 September	Southport	H	2–1		
13	2 October	Tranmere Rovers	A	3–0		
14	7 October	Chesterfield	A	3–1		
15	10 October	Tranmere Rovers	H	0–3		
16	14 October	Gillingham	H	1–2		
17	21 October	Millwall	A	0–3		
18	28 October	Mansfield Town	H	1–0		
19	11 November	Rochdale	H	2–2		
20	18 November	Crewe Alexandra	A	0–3		
21	2 December	Wrexham	A	2–2		
22	9 December	Doncaster Rovers	H	1–0		
23	16 December	Aldershot	A	1–0		
24	23 December	Stockport County	H	1–0		
25	26 December	Workington	H	1–2		
26	13 January	Oldham Athletic	A	0–5		
27	20 January	Accrington Stanley	H	2–0		
28	27 January	Exeter City	H	2–1		
29	3 February	Darlington	A	1–2		
30	10 February	Hartlepools United	H	1–0		
31	16 February	Southport	A	0–0		
32	24 February	Chesterfield	H	3–1		
33	3 March	Gillingham	A	1–4		
34	7 March	Workington	A	1–2		
35	10 March	Millwall	H	3–2		
36	13 March	Wrexham	H	1–0		
37	17 March	Mansfield Town	A	2–5		
38	24 March	Barrow	H	0–0		
39	26 March	Barrow	A	3–0		
40	31 March	Rochdale	A	1–1		
41	6 April	Crewe Alexandra	H	3–0		
42	14 April	Exeter City	A	0–4		
43	20 April	Bradford City	H	2–4		
44	23 April	Bradford City	A	2–3		
45	28 April	Doncaster Rovers	A	2–1		
46	1 May	Chester	H	2–0		

=== Football League Cup ===
Round	Date	Opponent	H/A	Score	Carlisle United Scorer(s)	Attendance
R1	12 September	Huddersfield Town	H	1–1		
R1 R	26 September	Huddersfield Town	A	0–3		

=== FA Cup ===
Round	Date	Opponent	H/A	Score	Carlisle United Scorer(s)	Attendance
R1	4 November	Darlington	A	4–0		
R2	25 November	Barnsley	A	2–1		
R3	8 January	Wolverhampton Wanderers	A	1–3	R. Thompson 90'	
