= 1958–59 Carlisle United F.C. season =

Carlisle United F.C.
1958–59 season
- Manager: Andy Beattie
- Stadium: Brunton Park
- Fourth Division: 10th
- FA Cup: Second Round

For the 1958–59 season, Carlisle United F.C. competed in Football League Division Four.

== Results & fixtures ==
=== Football League Fourth Division ===
==== League table ====
Pos	Team	Pld	W	D	L	GF	GA	GAv	Pts
8	Northampton Town	46	21	9	16	85	78	1.090	51
9	Millwall	46	20	10	16	76	69	1.101	50
10	Carlisle United	46	19	12	15	62	65	0.954	50
11	Gillingham	46	20	9	17	82	77	1.065	49
12	Torquay United	46	16	12	18	78	77	1.013	44

Source: rsssf.com

==== Matches ====
Match Day	Date	Opponent	H/A	Score	Carlisle United Scorer(s)	Attendance
1	23 August	Aldershot	H	1–0		
2	26 August	Gillingham	H	1–2		
3	30 August	Millwall	A	0–1		
4	1 September	Gillingham	A	1–1		
5	6 September	Walsall	H	1–1		
6	9 September	Northampton Town	H	2–1		
7	13 September	Darlington	A	1–0		
8	20 September	Shrewsbury Town	H	0–0		
9	23 September	Barrow	H	1–0		
10	27 September	Coventry City	A	2–1		
11	29 September	Barrow	A	3–1		
12	4 October	Exeter City	H	1–2		
13	11 October	York City	A	1–1		
14	18 October	Bradford Park Avenue	H	1–1		
15	25 October	Port Vale	A	1–1		
16	1 November	Crystal Palace	H	3–3		
17	8 November	Chester	A	1–2		
18	22 November	Hartlepools United	A	2–1		
19	29 November	Southport	H	5–0		
20	13 December	Crewe Alexandra	H	2–0		
21	20 December	Aldershot	A	0–4		
22	26 December	Workington	H	3–2		
23	27 December	Workington	A	1–0		
24	3 January	Millwall	H	0–2		
25	7 February	Shrewsbury Town	A	1–4		
26	14 February	Coventry City	H	1–6		
27	17 February	Crewe Alexandra	A	1–3		
28	21 February	Exeter City	A	1–2		
29	25 February	Torquay United	A	0–0		
30	28 February	York City	H	0–0		
31	3 March	Oldham Athletic	H	3–0		
32	7 March	Bradford Park Avenue	A	3–0		
33	11 March	Darlington	H	1–1		
34	14 March	Port Vale	H	0–3		
35	16 March	Watford	H	2–0		
36	21 March	Crystal Palace	A	2–0		
37	27 March	Gateshead	A	1–4		
38	28 March	Chester	H	4–3		
39	30 March	Gateshead	H	4–2		
40	4 April	Watford	A	2–2		
41	6 April	Northampton Town	A	0–0		
42	11 April	Hartlepools United	H	1–0		
43	14 April	Walsall	A	0–5		
44	18 April	Southport	A	1–0		
45	25 April	Torquay United	H	0–1		
46	28 April	Oldham Athletic	A	0–2		

=== FA Cup ===
Round	Date	Opponent	H/A	Score	Carlisle United Scorer(s)	Attendance
R1	15 November	Heanor Town	A	5–1		
R2	6 December	Chesterfield	H	0–0		
R2 R	10 December	Chesterfield	A	0–1		
