= 1963–64 Carlisle United F.C. season =

Carlisle United F.C.
1963–64 season
- Manager: Alan Ashman
- Stadium: Brunton Park
- Fourth Division: 1st
- FA Cup: Fifth Round
- League Cup: Second Round

For the 1963–64 season, Carlisle United F.C. competed in Football League Division Four.

== Results & fixtures ==
=== Football League Fourth Division ===
==== League table ====
Pos	Team	Pld	W	D	L	GF	GA	GAv	Pts	Promotion or relegation
1	Gillingham (C, P)	46	23	14	9	59	30	1.967	60	Promotion to the Third Division
2	Carlisle United (P)	46	25	10	11	113	58	1.948	60	Promotion to the Third Division
3	Workington (P)	46	24	11	11	76	52	1.462	59	Promotion to the Third Division
4	Exeter City (P)	46	20	18	8	62	37	1.676	58	Promotion to the Third Division
5	Bradford City	46	25	6	15	76	62	1.226	56	

Source: rsssf.com
(C) Champions; (P) Promoted

==== Matches ====
Match Day	Date	Opponent	H/A	Score	Carlisle United Scorer(s)	Attendance
1	24 August	Darlington	H	3–3		
2	26 August	Exeter City	H	3–0		
3	30 August	Tranmere Rovers	A	1–6		
4	7 September	Halifax Town	H	3–0		
5	11 September	Exeter City	A	0–1		
6	14 September	Torquay United	A	1–3		
7	16 September	Hartlepools United	A	6–0		
8	20 September	Oxford United	H	2–1		
9	27 September	Aldershot	H	4–0		
10	1 October	Hartlepools United	H	7–1		
11	5 October	Bradford City	A	2–2		
12	9 October	Gillingham	A	0–2		
13	12 October	Newport County	A	4–1		
14	15 October	Gillingham	H	3–1		
15	18 October	Stockport County	H	0–0		
16	22 October	Lincoln City	H	5–0		
17	26 October	Bradford Park Avenue	A	1–1		
18	30 October	Lincoln City	A	2–0		
19	2 November	Chesterfield	H	1–0		
20	9 November	Doncaster Rovers	A	1–1		
21	23 November	Chester	A	2–4		
22	30 November	York City	H	4–0		
23	14 December	Darlington	A	6–1		
24	21 December	Tranmere Rovers	H	5–2		
25	26 December	Workington	A	2–2		
26	28 December	Workington	H	3–1		
27	11 January	Halifax Town	A	2–1		
28	18 January	Torquay United	H	0–1		
29	1 February	Oxford United	A	2–1		
30	4 February	Bradford City	H	1–2		
31	8 February	Aldershot	A	2–3		
32	22 February	Newport County	H	3–3		
33	24 February	Brighton & Hove Albion	H	0–1		
34	29 February	Stockport County	A	3–0		
35	7 March	Bradford Park Avenue	H	4–0		
36	14 March	Chesterfield	A	0–2		
37	16 March	Barrow	A	2–2		
38	21 March	Doncaster Rovers	H	6–0		
39	27 March	Southport	H	5–2		
40	28 March	Rochdale	A	1–1		
41	30 March	Southport	A	0–3		
42	4 April	Chester	H	3–1		
43	11 April	York City	A	0–0		
44	17 April	Barrow	H	4–1		
45	21 April	Rochdale	H	1–0		
46	25 April	Brighton & Hove Albion	A	3–1		

=== Football League Cup ===
Round	Date	Opponent	H/A	Score	Carlisle United Scorer(s)	Attendance
R1	4 September	Crewe Alexandra	H	3–2		
R2	25 September	Manchester City	A	0–2		

=== FA Cup ===
Round	Date	Opponent	H/A	Score	Carlisle United Scorer(s)	Attendance
R1	16 November	York City	A	1–0		
R2	7 December	Gateshead	H	4–3		
R3	4 January	Queen's Park Rangers	H	2–0		
R4	25 January	Bedford Town	A	3–0		
R5	15 February	Preston North End	A	0–1		
