= 1930–31 Carlisle United F.C. season =

Carlisle United F.C.
1930–31 season
- Manager: Billy Hampson
- Stadium: Brunton Park
- Third Division North: 8th
- FA Cup: Third round

For the 1930–31 season, Carlisle United F.C. competed in Football League Third Division North.

== Results & fixtures ==
=== Football League Third Division North ===
==== League table ====
Pos	Team	Pld	W	D	L	GF	GA	GAv	Pts
6	Hull City	42	20	10	12	99	55	1.800	50
7	Stockport County	42	20	9	13	77	61	1.262	49
8	Carlisle United	42	20	5	17	98	81	1.210	45
9	Gateshead	42	16	13	13	71	73	0.973	45
10	Wigan Borough	42	19	5	18	76	86	0.884	43

Source: rsssf.com

==== Matches ====
Match Day	Date	Opponent	H/A	Score	Carlisle United Scorer(s)	Attendance
1	30 August	Chesterfield	A	1–2		
2	1 September	Tranmere Rovers	A	0–2		
3	6 September	Barrow	H	0–1		
4	11 September	Stockport County	H	5–1		
5	13 September	Southport	A	2–1		
6	15 September	Stockport County	A	0–1		
7	20 September	Accrington Stanley	H	7–3		
8	27 September	Rochdale	A	3–1		
9	4 October	Crewe Alexandra	H	4–1		
10	11 October	Wrexham	A	1–2		
11	18 October	New Brighton	H	2–0		
12	25 October	Gateshead	A	0–1		
13	1 November	Darlington	H	2–1		
14	8 November	Nelson	A	2–1		
15	15 November	Wigan Borough	H	6–1		
16	22 November	Hartlepools United	A	5–3		
17	6 December	Hull City	A	1–1		
18	20 December	Halifax Town	A	5–1		
19	25 December	York City	A	0–4		
20	26 December	York City	H	2–0		
21	27 December	Chesterfield	H	0–0		
22	1 January	Doncaster Rovers	H	1–1		
23	3 January	Barrow	A	2–7		
24	15 January	Lincoln City	H	3–6		
25	17 January	Southport	H	4–3		
26	24 January	Accrington Stanley	A	0–3		
27	31 January	Rochdale	H	7–1		
28	7 February	Crewe Alexandra	A	5–3		
29	14 February	Wrexham	H	1–1		
30	21 February	New Brighton	A	0–2		
31	28 February	Gateshead	H	2–2		
32	7 March	Darlington	A	0–3		
33	14 March	Nelson	H	8–1		
34	21 March	Wigan Borough	A	1–2		
35	28 March	Hartlepools United	H	3–0		
36	3 April	Rotherham United	H	1–2		
37	4 April	Lincoln City	A	1–5		
38	6 April	Rotherham United	A	0–1		
39	11 April	Hull City	H	1–5		
40	18 April	Doncaster Rovers	A	0–2		
41	25 April	Halifax Town	H	6–2		
42	2 May	Tranmere Rovers	H	3–0		

=== FA Cup ===
Round	Date	Opponent	H/A	Score	Carlisle United Scorer(s)	Attendance
R1	29 November	New Brighton	H	3–1		
R2	13 December	Tunbridge Wells Rangers	H	4–2		
R3	10 January	Bolton Wanderers	A	0–1		
