= 1947–48 Carlisle United F.C. season =

Carlisle United F.C.
1947–48 season
- Manager: Ivor Broadis
- Stadium: Brunton Park
- Third Division North: 9th
- FA Cup: First round
Home colours

For the 1947–48 season, Carlisle United F.C. competed in Football League Third Division North.

== Results & fixtures ==
=== Football League Third Division North ===
==== League table ====
Pos	Team	Pld	W	D	L	GF	GA	GAv	Pts
7	Barrow	42	16	13	13	49	40	1.225	45
8	Mansfield Town (Note: Mansfield Town had been transferred from Third Division South for this season.)	42	17	11	14	57	51	1.118	45
9	Carlisle United	42	18	7	17	88	77	1.143	43
10	Crewe Alexandra	42	18	7	17	61	63	0.968	43
11	Oldham Athletic	42	14	13	15	63	64	0.984	41

Source: rsssf.com

==== Matches ====
Match Day	Date	Opponent	H/A	Score	Carlisle United Scorer(s)	Attendance
1	23 August	Darlington	H	4–2		
2	25 August	York City	A	2–2		
3	30 August	Gateshead	A	3–1		
4	4 September	York City	H	1–1		
5	6 September	Hartlepools United	H	1–1		
6	8 September	Mansfield Town	A	3–2		
7	13 September	Rotherham United	A	2–7		
8	20 September	Stockport County	H	4–0		
9	27 September	Crewe Alexandra	H	5–2		
10	4 October	Chester City	A	1–4		
11	11 October	Bradford City	A	1–1		
12	18 October	Barrow	H	1–2		
13	25 October	Wrexham	A	1–2		
14	1 November	Halifax Town	H	2–5		
15	8 November	Rochdale	A	1–2		
16	15 November	New Brighton	H	2–1		
17	22 November	Southport	A	4–0		
18	6 December	Accrington Stanley	A	2–1		
19	13 December	Accrington Stanley	H	2–3		
20	20 December	Darlington	A	3–4		
21	26 December	Tranmere Rovers	A	3–0		
22	27 December	Tranmere Rovers	H	4–3		
23	1 January	Mansfield Town	H	3–1		
24	3 January	Gateshead	H	1–1		
25	10 January	Lincoln City	H	2–5		
26	17 January	Hartlepools United	A	1–1		
27	24 January	Hull City	H	0–0		
28	31 January	Rotherham United	H	0–3		
29	7 February	Stockport County	A	3–2		
30	14 February	Crewe Alexandra	A	2–0		
31	21 February	Chester	H	2–0		
32	28 February	Bradford City	H	1–2		
33	6 March	Barrow	A	0–2		
34	13 March	Wrexham	H	1–2		
35	20 March	Halifax Town	A	1–2		
36	26 March	Oldham Athletic	H	4–1		
37	27 March	Rochdale	H	5–0	Connor (3), Skivington (o.g.), ?	
38	29 March	Oldham Athletic	A	1–2		
39	3 April	New Brighton	A	3–1		
40	10 April	Southport	H	2–3		
41	17 April	Lincoln City	A	0–3		
42	1 May	Hull City	A	1–3		

=== FA Cup ===
Round	Date	Opponent	H/A	Score	Carlisle United Scorer(s)	Attendance
R1	29 November	Barrow	A	2–3		
