= 1986–87 Carlisle United F.C. season =

Carlisle United F.C.
1986–87 season
- Manager: Harry Gregg
- Stadium: Brunton Park
- Third Division: 22nd (relegated)
- FA Cup: First round
- League Cup: First round
- Football League Trophy: First round

For the 1986–87 season, Carlisle United F.C. competed in Football League Division Three.

== Results & fixtures ==
=== Football League Third Division ===
==== League table ====
Pos	Team	Pld	W	D	L	GF	GA	GD	Pts	Promotion or relegation
20	York City	46	12	13	21	55	79	−24	49	
21	Bolton Wanderers	46	10	15	21	46	58	−12	45	Relegated in play-offs (Note: Bolton Wanderers lost in the first round of the play-offs and were thus relegated.)
22	Carlisle United	46	10	8	28	39	78	−39	38	Relegated
23	Darlington	46	7	16	23	45	77	−32	37	Relegated
24	Newport County	46	8	13	25	49	86	−37	37	Relegated

==== Matches ====
Match Day	Date	Opponent	H/A	Score	Carlisle United Scorer(s)	Attendance
1	23 August	Chester City	A	2–2		
2	30 August	York City	H	2–2		
3	6 September	Blackpool	A	2–1		
4	13 September	Walsall	H	0–3		
5	16 September	Brentford	H	0–0		
6	20 September	Bristol City	A	0–3		
7	27 September	Mansfield Town	H	1–2		
8	11 October	Darlington	H	1–0		
9	14 October	Doncaster Rovers	A	0–2		
10	18 October	Gillingham	A	0–1		
11	21 October	Bury	H	2–1		
12	25 October	Bristol Rovers	H	2–0		
13	28 October	Newport County	A	1–1		
14	1 November	Wigan Athletic	A	0–2		
15	4 November	Port Vale	H	2–0		
16	8 November	Bournemouth	A	1–2		
17	22 November	Fulham	H	1–3		
18	29 November	Swindon Town	A	0–2		
19	13 December	Chesterfield	A	2–3		
20	21 December	Notts County	H	0–2		
21	26 December	Middlesbrough	A	0–1		
22	27 December	Rotherham United	H	3–5		
23	3 January	Fulham	A	0–3		
24	24 January	Blackpool	H	3–1		
25	3 February	Bolton Wanderers	H	0–0		
26	7 February	Brentford	A	1–3		
27	14 February	Bristol City	H	1–2		
28	21 February	Mansfield Town	A	0–2		
29	28 February	Newport County	H	2–2		
30	3 March	Wigan Athletic	H	0–2		
31	14 March	Gillingham	H	2–4		
32	17 March	Bury	A	0–0		
33	21 March	Darlington	A	1–0		
34	28 March	Doncaster Rovers	H	1–0		
35	31 March	York City	A	0–1		
36	4 April	Bournemouth	H	0–0		
37	7 April	Walsall	A	0–3		
38	11 April	Port Vale	A	1–0		
39	18 April	Bolton Wanderers	A	0–2		
40	20 April	Middlesbrough	H	0–1		
41	22 April	Bristol Rovers	A	0–4		
42	26 April	Notts County	A	1–2		
43	2 May	Swindon Town	A	0–3		
44	4 May	Rotherham United	A	1–2		
45	6 May	Chester City	H	0–2		
46	9 May	Chesterfield	H	3–0		

=== Football League Cup ===
Round	Date	Opponent	H/A	Score	Carlisle United Scorer(s)	Attendance
R1 L1	2 September	Grimsby Town	H	1–0		
R1 L2	9 September	Grimsby Town	A	0–2		

=== FA Cup ===
Round	Date	Opponent	H/A	Score	Carlisle United Scorer(s)	Attendance
R1	15 November	Notts County	A	1–1		
R1 R	18 November	Notts County	H	1–3		

=== Football League Trophy ===
Round	Date	Opponent	H/A	Score	Carlisle United Scorer(s)	Attendance
GS	8 December	Stockport County	A	1–0		
GS	16 December	Bury	H	3–2		
R1	20 January	Preston North End	H	1–2		
