= 1964–65 Carlisle United F.C. season =

Carlisle United F.C.
1964–65 season
- Manager: Alan Ashman
- Stadium: Brunton Park
- Third Division: 1st
- FA Cup: First Round
- League Cup: Second Round

For the 1964–65 season, Carlisle United F.C. competed in Football League Division Three.

== Results & fixtures ==
=== Football League Third Division ===
==== League table ====
Pos	Team	Pld	W	D	L	GF	GA	GAv	Pts	Promotion or relegation
1	Carlisle United	46	25	10	11	76	53	1.434	60	Division Champions, promoted
2	Bristol City	46	24	11	11	92	55	1.673	59	Promoted
3	Mansfield Town	46	24	11	11	95	61	1.557	59	
4	Hull City	46	23	12	11	91	57	1.596	58	
5	Brentford	46	24	9	13	83	55	1.509	57	

==== Matches ====
Match Day	Date	Opponent	H/A	Score	Carlisle United Scorer(s)	Attendance
1	22 August	Colchester United	A	1–0		
2	24 August	Port Vale	H	1–1		
3	28 August	Brentford	H	0–1		
4	31 August	Port Vale	A	3–1		
5	5 September	Bristol Rovers	A	2–5		
6	8 September	Watford	H	1–1		
7	12 September	Oldham Athletic	H	2–0		
8	17 September	Watford	A	0–0		
9	19 September	Exeter City	A	0–0		
10	26 September	Bournemouth & Boscombe Athletic	H	3–4		
11	1 October	Luton Town	A	1–1		
12	3 October	Peterborough United	A	2–1		
13	7 October	Luton Town	H	1–1		
14	9 October	Hull City	A	0–1		
15	17 October	Gillingham	H	3–1		
16	21 October	Grimsby Town	A	1–1		
17	23 October	Bristol City	A	2–1		
18	27 October	Walsall	H	2–1		
19	30 October	Queen's Park Rangers	H	2–0		
20	7 November	Shrewsbury Town	A	2–2		
21	21 November	Southend United	A	0–1		
22	28 November	Barnsley	H	4–0		
23	5 December	Walsall	A	0–1		
24	12 December	Colchester United	H	4–1		
25	19 December	Brentford	A	1–6		
26	26 December	Workington	H	1–0		
27	28 December	Workington	A	1–0		
28	2 January	Bristol Rovers	H	1–2		
29	9 January	Grimsby Town	H	3–1		
30	16 January	Oldham Athletic	A	3–2		
31	29 January	Scunthorpe United	A	1–0		
32	6 February	Bournemouth & Boscombe Athletic	A	4–0		
33	13 February	Peterborough United	H	2–1		
34	20 February	Hull City	H	0–0		
35	27 February	Gillingham	A	0–1		
36	6 March	Scunthorpe United	H	3–1		
37	9 March	Exeter City	H	2–1		
38	12 March	Queen's Park Rangers	A	2–1		
39	16 March	Reading	H	1–2		
40	19 March	Shrewsbury Town	H	2–1		
41	27 March	Reading	A	2–1		
42	2 April	Southend United	H	4–3		
43	10 April	Barnsley	A	2–1		
44	16 April	Bristol City	H	1–1		
45	19 April	Mansfield Town	A	0–2		
46	20 April	Mansfield Town	H	3–0		

=== Football League Cup ===
Round	Date	Opponent	H/A	Score	Carlisle United Scorer(s)	Attendance
R1	2 September	Southport	A	0–0		
R1 R	14 September	Southport	H	1–0		
R2	23 September	Bristol City	H	4–1		
R2	14 October	Chesterfield	A	1–3		

=== FA Cup ===
Round	Date	Opponent	H/A	Score	Carlisle United Scorer(s)	Attendance
R1	22 January	Crook Town	A	0–1		
