= Fred Emery (footballer) =

English footballer

Personal information
- Full name: Frederick David Emery
- Date of birth: 19 May 1900
- Place of birth: Lincoln, England
- Date of death: 1959 (aged 58–59)
- Height: 5 ft 8 in (1.73 m)
- Position: Wing half

Senior career*
Years	Team	Apps	(Gls)
1921?–1922?	Lincoln City	0	(0)
1922?–1923?	Wibsey	?	(?)
1923?–1924	Bradford City	5	(0)
1924–1936	Doncaster Rovers	417	(30)

Managerial career
- 1936–1940: Doncaster Rovers
- 1943–1951: Bradford Park Avenue
- 1951–1958: Carlisle United
- * Club domestic league appearances and goals

Frederick David Emery (19 May 1900 – 1959) was an English footballer who played as a wing half in the Football League with Doncaster Rovers in the 1920s and 1930s.

He was born in Lincoln and signed for Lincoln City but did not play a senior game for them, before having a brief spell with Bradford City, amounting to five senior games.

In the 1924–25 season he made his debut for Doncaster Rovers and was to go on and play 439 senior games for them (scoring 32 goals) in a playing career that was to last until the 1935–36 season. As of 2009 he holds the record for the most Football League appearances made for Doncaster. In 1936 he was appointed manager at Doncaster, a position he held until the war.

On 25 October 1943, he was appointed manager of Bradford (Park Avenue) succeeding David Steele. He was fortunate to inherit a talented squad, and his management style went down well with the players. He guided Bradford to the quarter-finals of the FA Cup in 1945–6, and masterminded the club's greatest cup victory in January 1948, when champions-elect Arsenal were defeated 1–0 at Highbury. After the war he netted the club around £52,000 in transfer fees when Geoff Walker, Len Shackleton, Johnny Downie and Jimmy Stephen moved to bigger clubs. When Bradford dropped out of the Second Division in 1950, and failed to go straight back, he left Park Avenue in June 1951 and was succeeded by Vic Buckingham.

In July 1951, Emery was appointed as Carlisle United manager, replacing future Liverpool manager Bill Shankly who left Carlisle to join Grimsby Town. In a seven-year spell as Carlisle manager Emery never was able inspire the Brunton Park faithful like his predecessor did, but he was able to the keep the club in a stable mid-table position in the Third Division North despite being handicapped by limited resources. He left the club in April 1958. He died in Carlisle in 1959 following a short illness, just a year after United had dispensed with his services.

His brother Bob and nephew Tony were also footballers.
