= Millmoor =

Stadium in Rotherham, South Yorkshire, England

Coordinates: 53°25′42.12″N 1°22′12.83″W

Millmoor Ground
- Millmoor
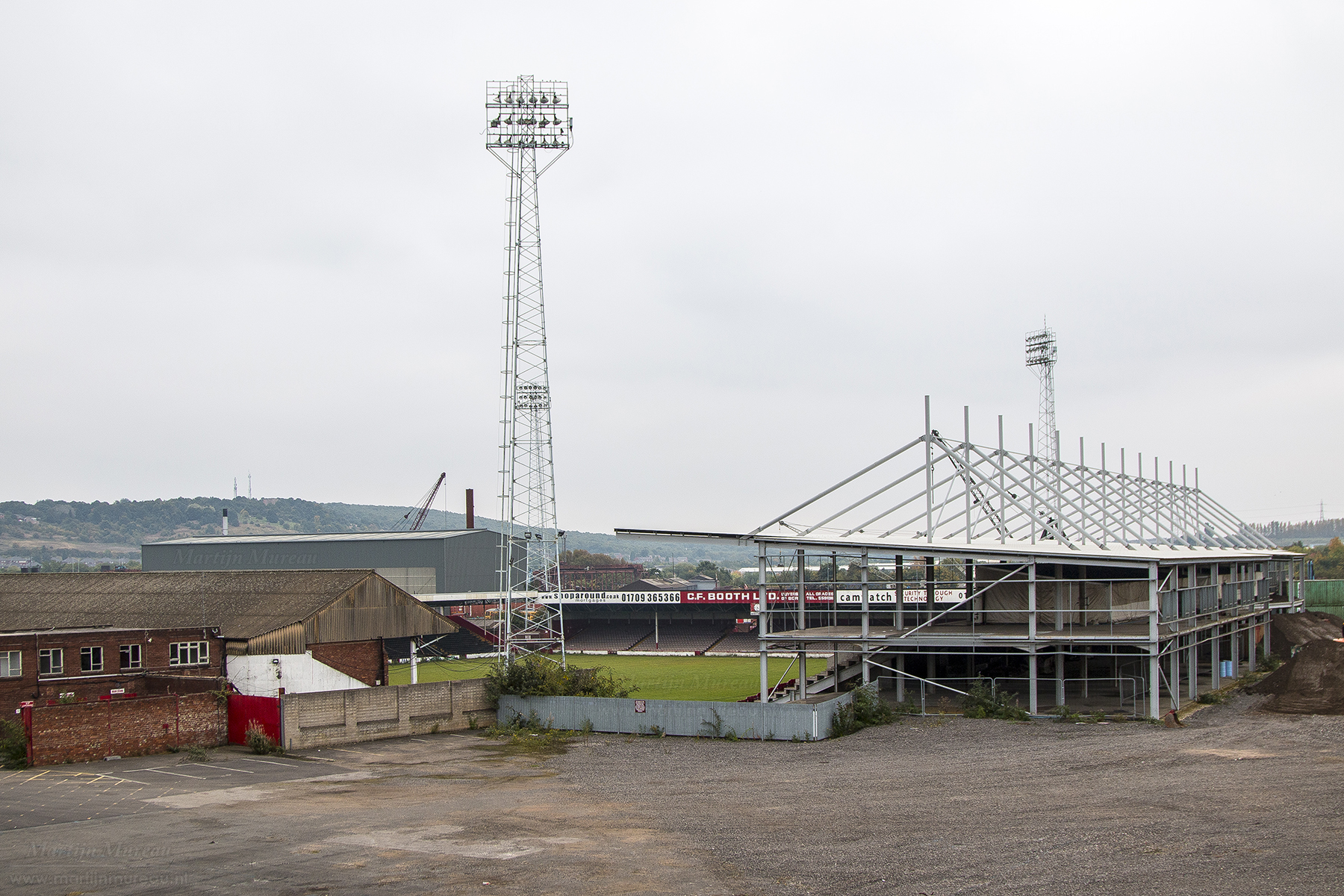
- An abandoned Millmoor in 2015, Rotherham
- Interactive map of Millmoor Ground
- Location: Millmoor Lane; Rotherham; England
- Owner: C F Booth
- Capacity: 8,300
- Record attendance: 25,170 Rotherham United v Sheffield United; 13 December 1952
- Field size: 110 by 72 yards (100.6 m × 65.8 m)

Construction
- Renovated: 1920, 1951, 2004
- Expanded: 1920
- Demolished: 2026

Tenants
- Rotherham County (1907–1925); Rotherham United (1925–2008); Westfield United (2016–2017); Wickersley Youth (2023–2026)

The Millmoor Ground, commonly known as Millmoor, was a football stadium in Rotherham, South Yorkshire, England. It was the home ground of Rotherham County between 1907 and 1925, and then its successor Rotherham United until the 2007-08 season. The stadium has had no professional tenant since, but has been in use again for local youth football since 2016. It has been described as "the spiritual home" of Rotherham United. Demolition started on the site in August 2026 and is expected to take four months.

== History ==
The stadium was in use during the 1890s, with Rotherham Church Institute using the ground in the Sheffield Association League. It presently has a capacity of around 8,300.

During the 1990s, relocation to a new all-seater stadium in Rotherham was considered, but the original preferred site for a new stadium had become unavailable by the time Rotherham won promotion to Division One in 2001, and so the club were faced with the need to develop a new all-seater stadium at Millmoor or elsewhere. Initially, the club chose to convert Millmoor into an all-seater stadium.

Redevelopment work was started on the ground, with a new main stand being built in place of the previous wooden main stand which was built in the 1950s. The new stand was planned to contain corporate facilities and bring the capacity back to over 10,000. The work was scheduled to finish in 2006, but faced a series of setbacks, one of which was Japanese knotweed being found on the site. The work was never finished and the main stand remains half-built. Rotherham United have now moved to a new community stadium. In May 2011 Rotherham Titans and Rotherham Council announced a plan to allow the rugby union club to move into Millmoor. After much speculation it was announced in December 2011 that the Titans would remain at Clifton Lane for the foreseeable future due to the deal falling through.

Millmoor hosted a number of memorable Rotherham United games, including the first leg of the inaugural Football League Cup final against Aston Villa in 1961, which Rotherham won 2–0.

The ground hosted several finals of the Rotherham Charity Cup. On 17 March 1900, Rotherham beat rivals Thornhill United 2-0. Sydney Cooper and Gilding, scoring for Rotherham. The following season on the 9th March 1901 Thornhill United beat Rotherham 2-1 in the Rotherham Charity Cup final with an attendance of 6,500.

On 22 September 2007, for Rotherham United's game against Notts County, it was a special day to celebrate 100 years at Millmoor. The game ended 1–1, with Peter Holmes scoring for the Millers. There were special articles in the matchday programme and a commemorative cover. There were balloons all around Millmoor, with the Millers' badge, and the words "100 Years at Millmoor". Fans were urged to wear retro Rotherham United shirts in order to be entered into a raffle. Many fans were seen with new scarves with "Rotherham United FC" on one side and "1907–2007" on the other side.

In May 2008, Rotherham United were forced to leave Millmoor after talks with Ken Booth, owner of Millmoor, broke down. The team played at the athletics Don Valley Stadium in Sheffield until 2012, when the club moved into a new community stadium back in Rotherham.

Despite this, Millmoor remains in existence more than a decade after the football club's departure and has been used for other sports purposes.

== Structure and facilities ==
=== Tivoli End ===
The Tivoli was a favourite amongst the fans. The stand holds up to 2,700. It was originally a terrace but was later converted to an all-seater stand during the club's time in Division One.

=== Railway End ===
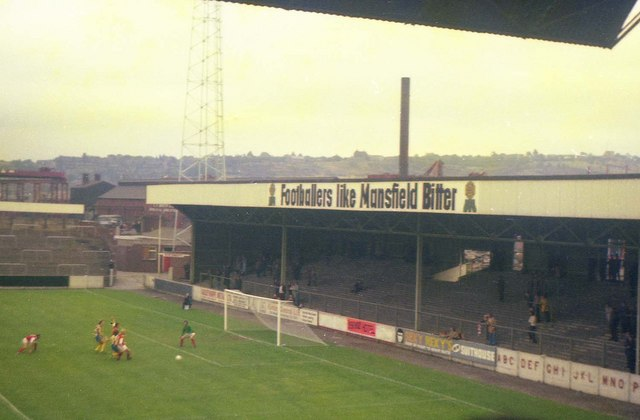
Away terrace in 1976

The Railway End is the away fans section where over 2,000 fans can be accommodated. This end is covered and all seated. An unusual feature is that away fans can only access this end by going down Millmoor Lane, which is a narrow alleyway. The acoustics in the Railway End are said to be some of the best and fans can generate a lot of noise. If needed, away fans can be given additional seats in a section of the Millmoor Lane stand.

The railway referred to in the stand's name is the now closed line to the former Rotherham Westgate railway station.

=== Main stand ===
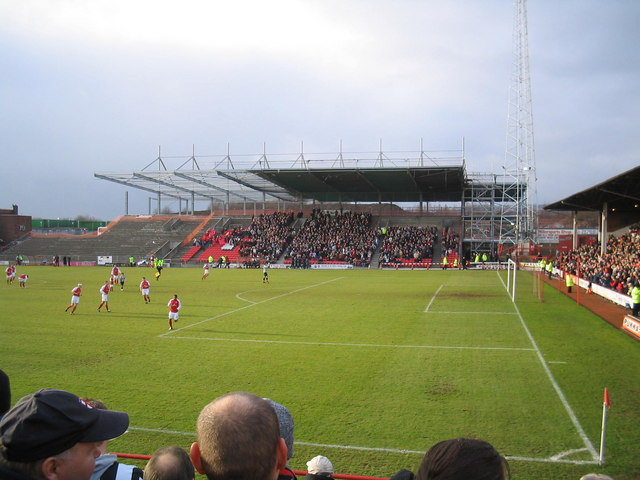
Stand under construction in 2005

Redevelopment work was started on this stand. However, work ceased and in November 2007 the club confirmed that it had no intentions to complete this stand or modernise any part of the stadium due to the difficulty in reaching a deal to purchase the land surrounding Millmoor from the previous chairman. This dispute later led to Rotherham United moving away from the stadium. The stand remains partly finished.

=== Millmoor Lane End ===
Opposite to the Main Stand is the Millmoor Lane side of the ground. It is split up into three sections:

- Tivoli end/Uncovered end - before the ground was all-seated in conformity with the rules of the Championship, the corner of the ground underneath the floodlights was a continuation of the terraces of the Tivoli End. When the section was all seated, the Tivoli End was split up into two parts for safety reasons: the part of the stand segregated from the Tivoli Stand is now simply called "The Uncovered End" due to the fact there is no roof over the heads of the home supporters housed there.
- Millmoor Lane - in the middle of the Millmoor Lane side is the Millmoor Lane, which is a small stand for home supporters.

== Other uses ==
Greyhound racing took place at Millmoor Stadium from 11 May 1931 until 29 July 1933. The racing was independent (not affiliated to the sport's governing body the National Greyhound Racing Club) and was known as a "flapping track", which was the nickname given to independent tracks.
