= Old Show Ground =

Defunct football stadium in Scunthorpe, Lincolnshire, England

Coordinates: 53°35′30.96″N 0°39′35.60″W

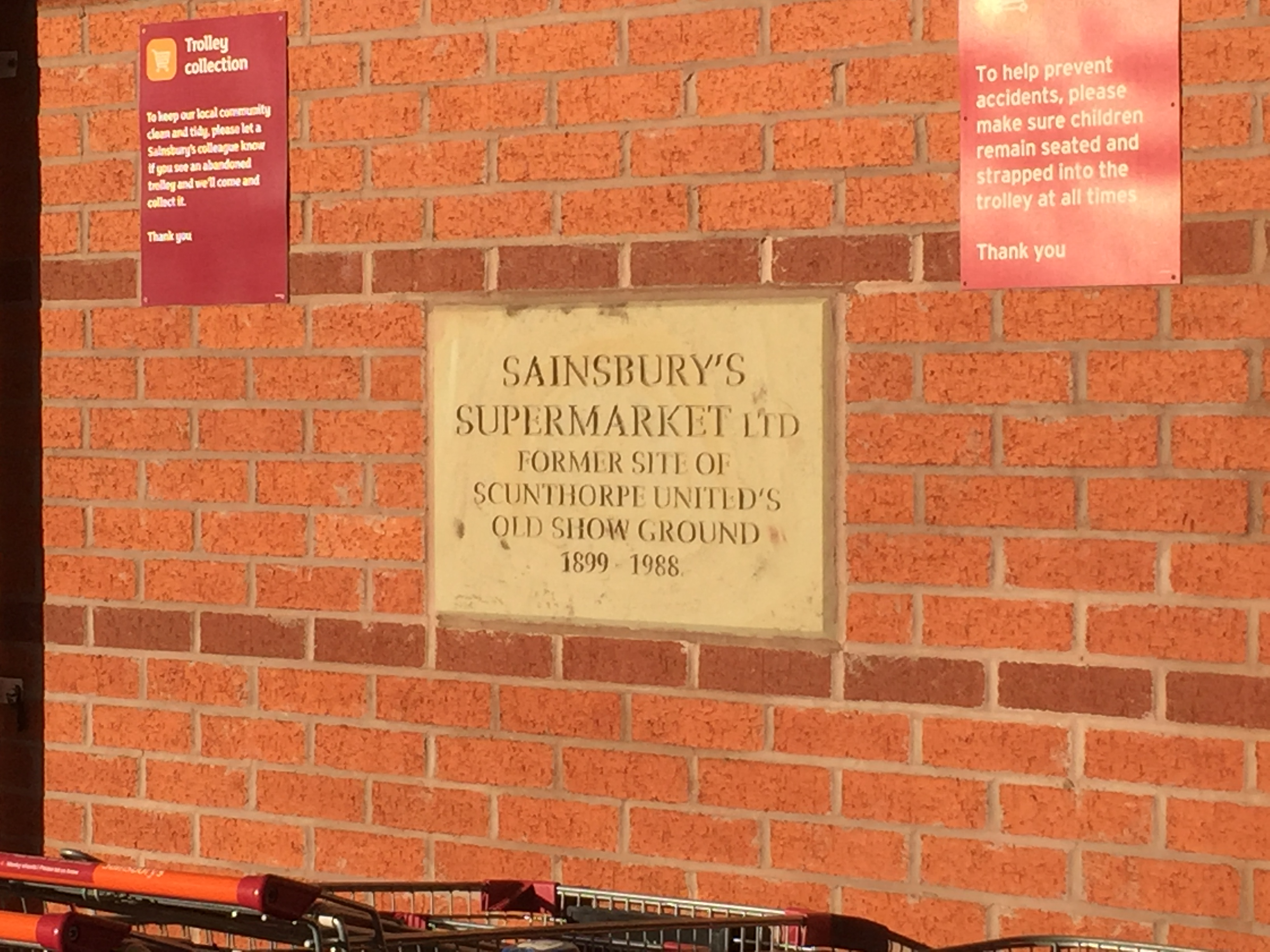
The stone marking the former site of the Old Show Ground

The Old Show Ground was a football stadium in Scunthorpe, Lincolnshire, England, that was the original home of Scunthorpe United from 1899 until 1988, when they moved to Glanford Park – the first newly constructed Football League stadium since Southend United's Roots Hall 33 years earlier.

Evidence shows that the site, situated in the centre of Scunthorpe at the junction of Doncaster Road and Henderson Avenue, was hosting events, including the annual Scunthorpe show, as far back as 1867. When first taking over the site in 1899, Scunthorpe paid an annual £10 rent. The site was also initially known simply as "the Showground", but it is unclear when the prefix "Old" was added.

Scunthorpe's merger with local side North Lindsey United saw the club renamed Scunthorpe & Lindsey United in 1910, with the new club's admission to the Midland League two years later ensuring that the Old Showground hosted semi-professional football for the first time. There were two separate efforts to have the ground demolished in World War I, to be replaced with houses or allotments; but these efforts were successfully fought off by the football club and local benefactors.

When competitive football resumed at the end of the war, Scunthorpe & Lindsey United bought the ground from its owners for £2,980 in December 1919; down from the original £7,000 price they were quoted three months earlier.

Following a fire four years earlier, which burned the entire West Stand, including the changing rooms and team kit, debts of £760 from two new stands at the Old Showground proved potentially fatal. The efforts to sell the ground and the club's resignation from the Midland League were only withdrawn at the 11th hour in November 1924, after all players agreed to take a pay cut and the Barnsley Brewing Company agreed to take over a £400 mortgage owed on the ground.

With competitive football suspended following the outbreak of World War II and large gatherings banned in coastal communities, the Old Showground hosted arch-rivals Grimsby Town in lieu of their own Blundell Park being unavailable. Highlights included 15,000 spectators attending Grimsby's 1942 Football League War Cup semi-final against Sunderland. The Old Showground then hosted Football League football for the first time after Scunthorpe & Lindsey United's successful election to the Football League in 1950, with a 0–0 draw against Shrewsbury in the Third Division North.

Scunthorpe's record attendance of 23,935 was set at the Old Show Ground on 30 January 1954 for an FA Cup fourth round tie against Portsmouth. The club's highest-ever attendance for a league fixture, 19,076 against Grimsby, was set two years later.

In March 1958, just before the club's Third Division North title win, the stadium's East Stand was destroyed by fire, with manager Ron Suart only finding out after a group of local children burst into his office to break the news. The stand was rebuilt in just five months.

Britain's first-ever cantilever football stand now stood on the ground's eastern boundary, built at the nearby Scunthorpe steelworks, in time for the now renamed Scunthorpe United's first-ever Second Division fixture; a 1–1 draw against Ipswich Town.

During this era, the Old Showground earned a fearsome reputation for being a difficult place for visiting teams to visit. Goalkeeper Ivor Williams, who played for the club between 1952 and 1960, fondly remembered: "It was brilliant to play under the lights on a Friday night. Tremendous. The Old Showground had real atmosphere – not quite like Glanford Park! With the slope on it? Oh, it was brilliant. A sideways slope, not lengthways!"

Following on-pitch and financial struggles throughout the 1970s and 1980s however, plus stricter safety measures (including the banning of wooden stands) introduced following the Bradford City stadium fire, the club's board unanimously voted that renovating the Old Showground to modern standards was not financially viable. It was instead elected to seek a move to a new stadium altogether. With final permission for the new Glanford Park site granted by Glanford Borough Council's planning department in January 1987, the entire Old Showground site was sold for £2.3million to the supermarket chain Safeway.

Attempts to move the cantilever stand to Glanford Park proved impractical and discussions to sell the stand to Doncaster Rugby League club eventually fell through, leading to its eventual demolition along with the rest of the stadium. The Old Showground's final match was thus a Fourth Division play-off semi-final second leg, 1–1 draw with Torquay United; with Steve Lister scoring the final ever goal at the ground.

Following Scunthorpe's departure, Safeway duly demolished the ground and constructed a store on the site. Safeway were taken over in 2004 by Morrisons and the site was subsequently sold to its current inhabitants, Sainsbury's. The site of the centre spot was previously highlighted by a plaque in front of the delicatessen counter; however, this was later removed and all that remains of the site's former use is a plaque by the entrance to the store.
