= Belle Vue (Doncaster) =

Home of English professional football club Doncaster Rovers from 1922 to 2007

- Old Belle Vue
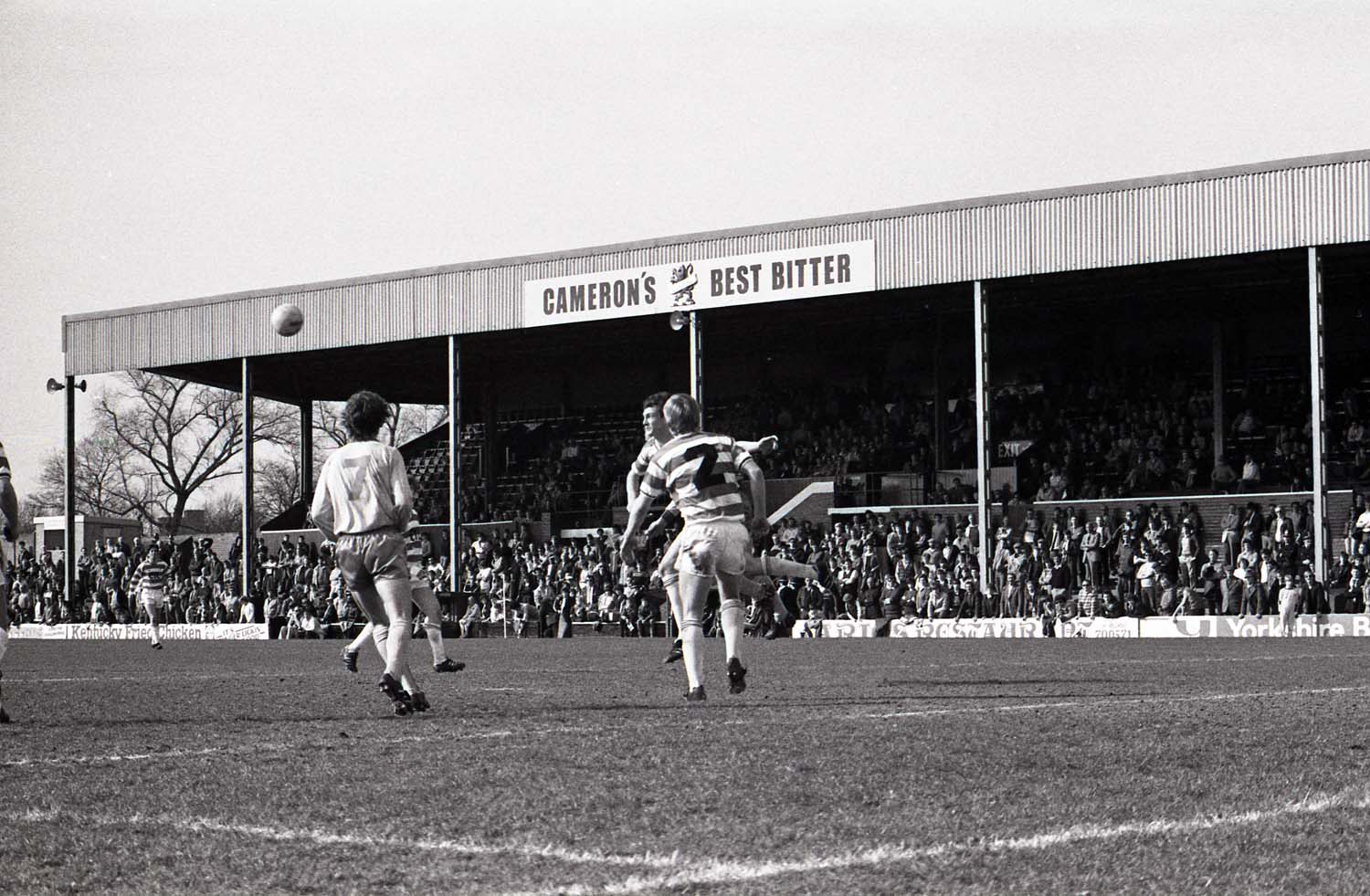
- The Main Stand of the ground in 1983.
- Interactive map of Belle Vue
- Full name: Belle Vue
- Location: Bawtry Road, Doncaster
- Coordinates: 53°31′00.71″N 1°06′16.92″W
- Owner: Doncaster Rovers
- Operator: Doncaster Rovers
- Capacity: 11,500 (at closure)

Construction
- Built: 1922
- Opened: 26 August 1922
- Closed: 23 December 2006
- Demolished: 2007

Tenants
- Doncaster Rovers (1922–2006); Doncaster RLFC (1995–96, 1998–2006); Doncaster Belles L.F.C. (1991–1997)

Belle Vue was a football stadium in Doncaster, South Yorkshire, England, that served as the home ground of Doncaster Rovers from 1922 to 2007. The ground was affectionately known as "Old Belle Vue" (OBV) by fans and at its peak had a total capacity of 40,000.

== History ==
The ground was opened by Charles E. Sutcliffe from the Football League on Saturday 26 August 1922. The opposition was Gainsborough Trinity. The initial capacity was for 7,000 spectators, which was extended year-on-year as finances allowed. In 1927 the main stand at Doncaster's former ground in the suburb of Bennetthorpe was lifted and moved on rollers to Belle Vue to form the family stand, where it remained until 1985 when the Valley Parade fire in Bradford meant that the old wooden structure was condemned and was demolished.

In 1938 the capacity of Belle Vue was increased to 40,000 and it was in 1948 that the stadium recorded its highest attendance of 37,099 against Hull City, although apocryphal accounts refute this and claim that many more gained entry to the ground by climbing over walls.

== Rovers decline and 1995 fire ==
In the later years of the 20th century, as the club's fortunes began to decline and finances became tighter, the capacity of Belle Vue was cut dramatically, falling as low as 4,859 in May 1987 when mining subsidence was found underground beneath the Popular Stand terrace.

A fire in the Main Stand one night in June 1995 caused extensive damage and nine months later chairman Ken Richardson was arrested following an evening match against Fulham. He was found guilty of conspiracy to commit arson and sentenced to four years' imprisonment. The actual arsonist, Alan Kristiansen, received a one-year prison sentence; it was revealed that Kristiansen, a former SAS soldier, had been paid £10,000 by Richardson to start the fire. His accomplices both received nine-month prison sentences, suspended for two years.

== 2003 renovations ==
In the summer of 2003 work began to repair the Town End terrace, to replace the old seating in the Main Stand and to extend the Rossington terrace. In the summer of 2004 the Popular Stand terrace was also extended and executive boxes were built at the Town End of the stadium. New club offices, a new supporters bar and the application of tarmac to the car park completed a much-needed facelift. In a move that angered some fans Belle Vue was renamed the Earth Stadium as part of a sponsorship deal with Rotherham-based finance company Earth Finance. The capacity reached the region of 11,500.

== Keepmoat Stadium and Belle Vue closes ==
A new stadium had long been mooted for Doncaster Rovers. This finally started to become a reality when planning permission was granted. Construction started on 17 October 2005 of a 15,000 all-seater community stadium complex. The new ground was named the Keepmoat Stadium.

The last game at Belle Vue was on 23 December 2006 against League One leaders, Nottingham Forest. Doncaster Rovers finished their time at the stadium with a win, with a goal from Theo Streete ensuring a 1–0 victory.

== Gas explosion and demolition ==
In the early hours of 7 February 2007, local residents near the stadium described a sound "like a bomb going off", later determined to be a gas explosion. The impact of the blast destroyed most of the Main Stand. Two people at the scene received hospital treatment for injuries sustained in the explosion, one of whom had to be transferred to a specialist burns unit in Nottingham, while one lane of Bawtry Road had to be closed for two hours because of scattered debris and the risk of further explosions.

Following the explosion, demolition of the stadium was rapidly sped up. For a long time after its demolition, areas of terrace were still identifiable and large sections of the pitch remained. Floodlights, executive boxes, turnstiles, snack bars and offices were all removed or destroyed, along with the ground's club house, the Rovers' Return.

The site was patrolled by security following the explosion and was fenced off whilst demolition work was undertaken.

The whole area has now been redeveloped as a housing estate with virtually all traces of the old stadium now removed.
