= Park Avenue (stadium) =

Sports venue in Yorkshire, England

Coordinates: 53°46′57″N 1°46′12″W

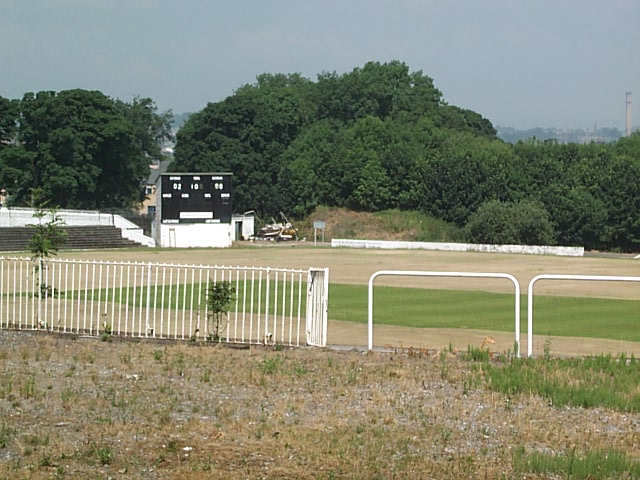
- Interactive map of Park Avenue

Ground information
- Location: Bradford, Yorkshire
- Country: England
- Establishment: 1872 (first recorded match)
- End names
- City End; Southern End

International information
- Only women's ODI: 7 July 1973: England v Jamaica

Team information
Players of the North	(1880)
Yorkshire	(1881–1996)
Players	(1886)
- As of 3 September 2020; Source: Ground profile

Park Avenue is a sports ground on Horton Park Avenue in Bradford, West Yorkshire, England that has been used for cricket, football and both codes of rugby. Yorkshire regularly played cricket matches at the ground between 1881 and 1996, while the site was also home to former Football League club Bradford (Park Avenue), to which it lent its name.

The cricket pitch remains intact, but the adjoining football stadium has been demolished and replaced with a gym and cricket nets. When the ground was at its peak both the adjacent grounds shared a now-demolished double-sided grandstand designed by noted football architect Archibald Leitch, similar to the joint rugby-and-cricket grounds at Headingley Stadium in nearby Leeds.

== History ==
=== Cricket ===
The cricket ground was a regular home for Yorkshire for more than a century, hosting 306 first class and 48 list A matches and attracting tens of thousands of fans to big fixtures.

The first match, starting on 20 September 1880 pitted the Players of the North against the touring Australians while the last first-class game in June 1996 saw Yorkshire CCC play Leicestershire CCC in the County Championship. This final game saw Leicestershire compile 681 for seven wickets declared, the record score on the ground, with Vince Wells and James Whitaker both scoring double hundreds. A women's one day international was held there on 7 July 1973 in the Women's World Cup when England Women played Jamaica Women. Park Avenue was also the scene of the famous Test Trial of 1950 when Jim Laker took an incredible eight wickets for two runs in 14 overs as "The Rest", including Peter May, were skittled for 27. Worcestershire CCC were bowled out for 28 by Yorkshire in 1907 when John Newstead took seven wickets for ten runs.

Percy Holmes recorded the highest score on the ground, 275 against Warwickshire CCC in 1928 while C.B. Fry scored 234 for Sussex in 1903. Six bowlers took nine wickets in an innings at Park Avenue, with Albert Thomas taking nine for 30 for Northamptonshire CCC in 1920 and Emmott Robinson taking his career best nine for 36 in a Roses Match in the same year.

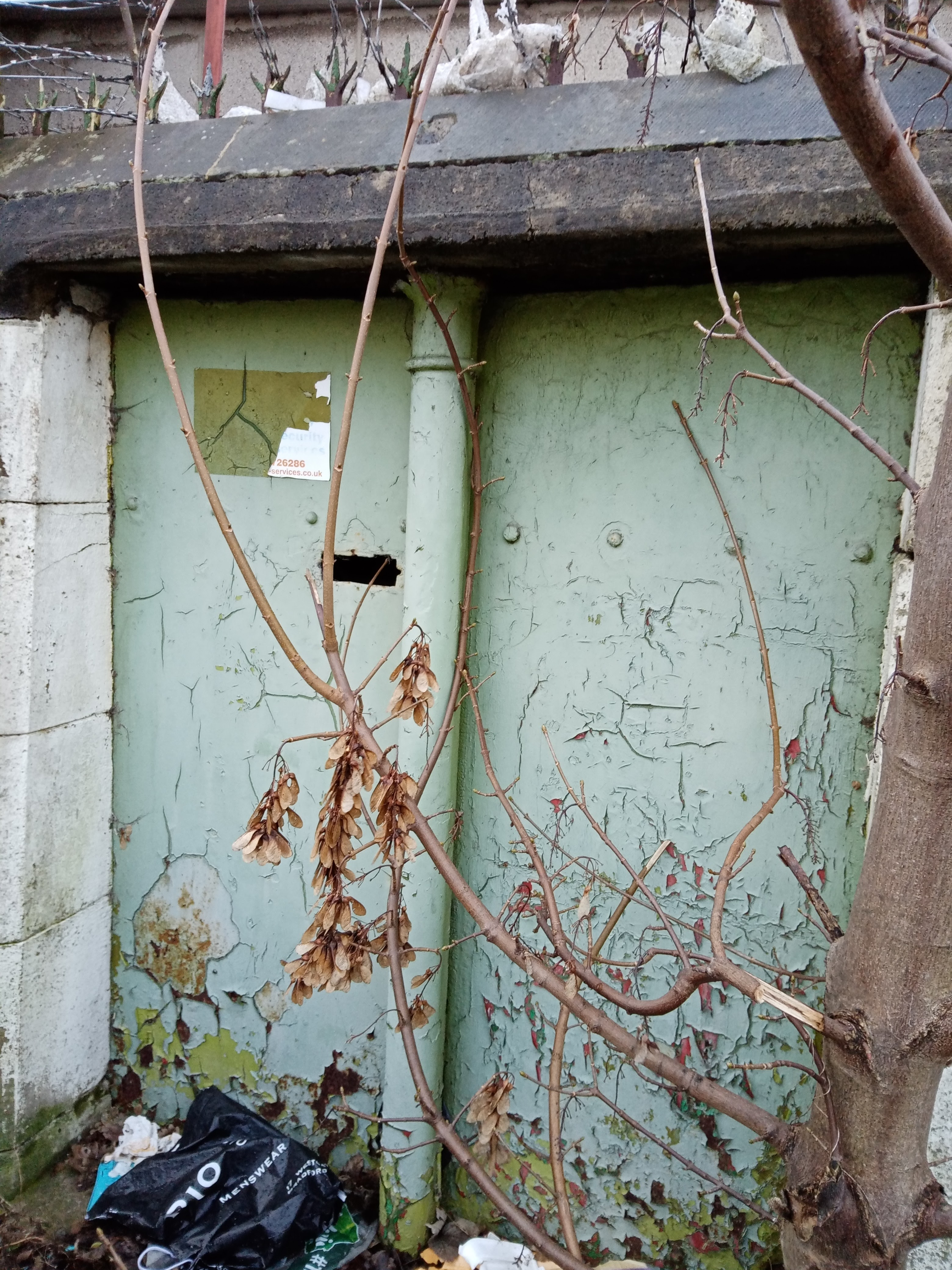
Old Turnstiles at Park Avenue

=== Rugby ===
When Bradford FC was formed in 1863 it was a club that played only rugby. They moved to Park Avenue in 1880 and played their first game against Bradford Rangers on 25 September 1880.

In 1895 the club left the Rugby Football Union to join the Northern Union in 1895, playing what would become Rugby league. At the same time Bradford FC also occasionally played soccer, meaning that until 1907 the Park Avenue was used for both sports, although it was primarily a rugby league ground.

During this period Bradford FC were a successful rugby league team – they were runners-up the 1898 Challenge Cup, won the championship in 1903–04, and won the 1906 Challenge Cup, all while playing at the Park Avenue ground.

=== Football ===
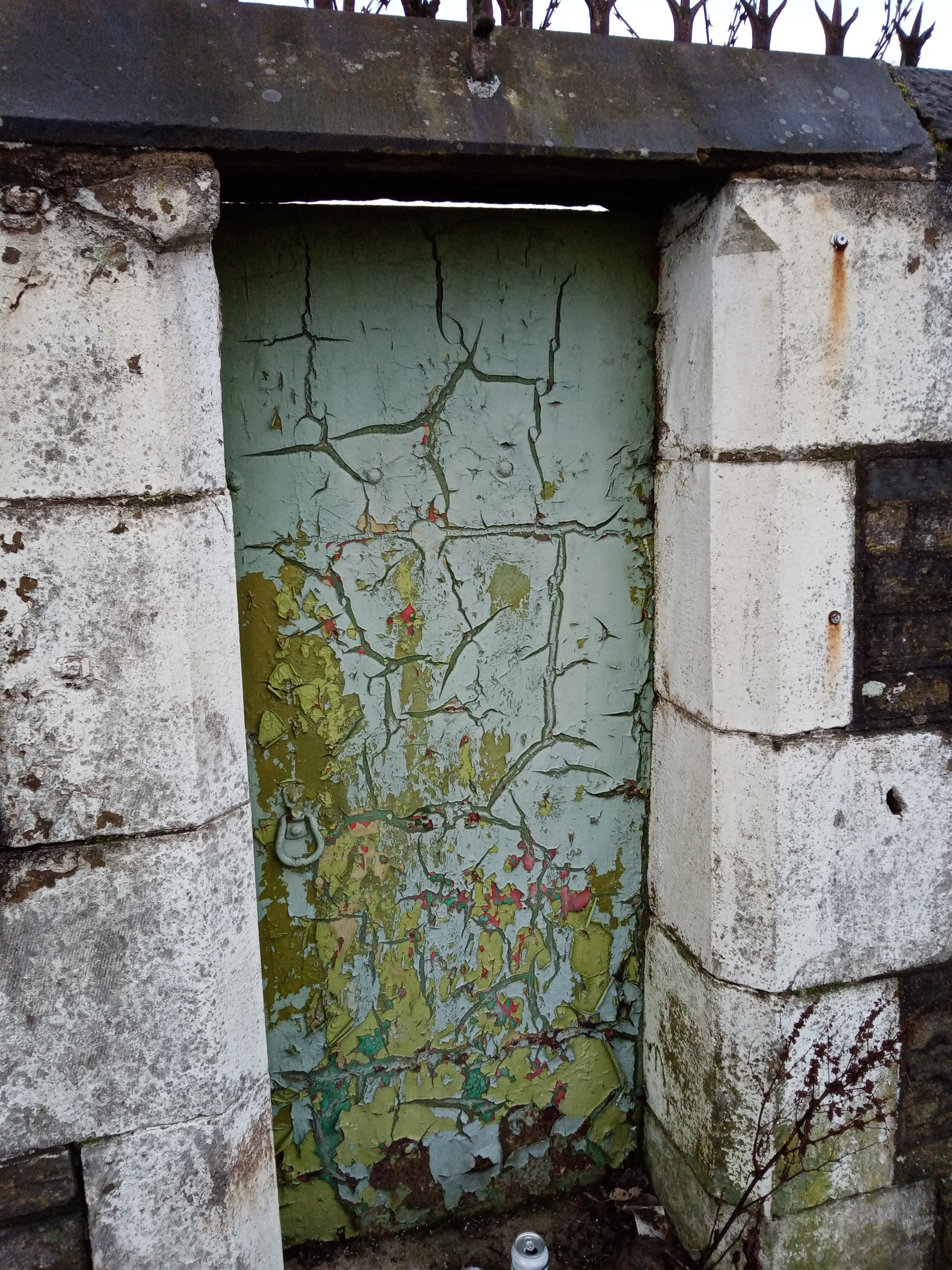
Old Turnstiles at Park Avenue

In 1907 Bradford FC members voted to abandon rugby league and instead primarily play association football, later joining the Football League. The club remained officially known as Bradford, but "(Park Avenue)" was often added to their name to avoid confusion with rivals Bradford City.

The ground hosted a Home Championships football match between England and Ireland in February 1909.

The record attendance was set when 32,810 watched Stanley Matthews play in a War Cup tie in 1944. Bradford (Park Avenue) was voted out of the Football League in 1970, playing their final match in front of 2,563 spectators. After struggling in non-League for several seasons the club sold the ground in 1973 for financial reasons. The council later demolished the overgrown stadium in 1980 on safety grounds.

After going bust and reforming as a Sunday league team in 1975, Bradford (Park Avenue) was reformed as a semi-professional club late in 1987 and eventually returned to what was left of their old Park Avenue stadium for one season, only to have to vacate it again when an indoor cricket centre was built on part of the pitch. Following a nomadic existence, during which time they played at a number of local grounds, the reformed club are now well established at the nearby Horsfall Stadium.

=== Modern day ===
Although the football ground has long been demolished, the cricket ground remains and is operated by the Park Avenue Bradford Charity. Further plans are in place for a new pavilion on the cricket ground. The perimeter wall of the football ground remains and some of the bricked up terrace entrances can still be seen on Canterbury Avenue with admission signs still in place.
