= Borough Park (Workington) =

Football ground in Workington, England

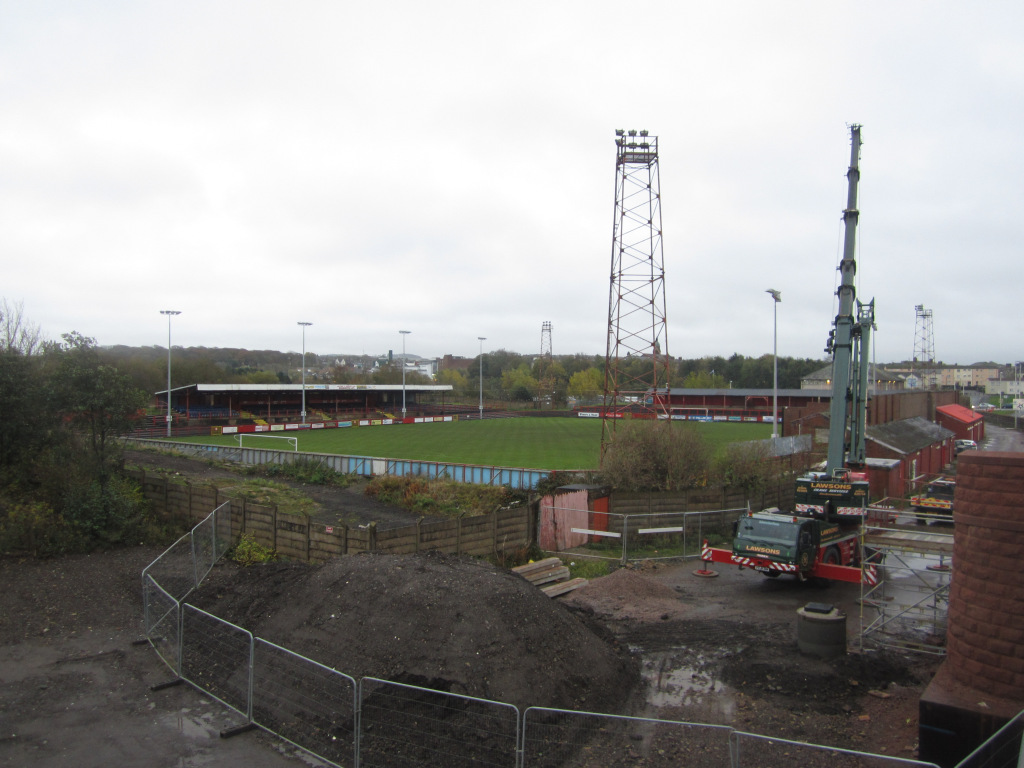
- Borough Park, seen from the new Northside Bridge
- Interactive map of Borough Park
- Location: Workington, England
- Coordinates: 54°38′55″N 3°33′04″W
- Capacity: 3,101 (500 seated)
- Surface: Grass
- Record attendance: 21,000

Construction
- Opened: 1937

Tenants
- Workington A.F.C. Workington Town (1944–1956)

Borough Park is a football stadium in Workington, Cumbria, England. The home ground of Workington A.F.C., it has a capacity of 3,101, of which 500 is seated.

== History ==
Borough Park was built with the assistance of the local council, and opened in 1937, with Workington moving from their previous Lonsdale Park ground, which was next to Borough Park. The ground initially consisted of a 1,000 seat main stand on the western touchline, and banking around the remainder of the pitch, but by 1951 the embankments had been converted to terracing, and two more stands erected in the north-west and south-west corners of the ground.

Workington were elected to the Football League in 1951, and the first League match at Borough Park saw them defeat Chesterfield 3–1 in front of 11,000 spectators. The ground underwent further expansion during the 1950s as the main stand was extended and the terracing on the eastern side of the pitch was roofed in 1956. The record attendance of 21,000 was set on 4 January 1958 for an FA Cup match against Manchester United. The League record attendance of 18,628 was set for a local derby against Carlisle United on 26 December 1963.

Workington were voted out of the League in 1977 and replaced by Wimbledon F.C. The main stand was closed and the roof removed in 1988.

Borough Park was also the home of the town's rugby league club Workington Town from when they formed after the Second World War in 1945 until they moved out in 1956 and into their own new ground nearby, Derwent Park.

== Workington Stadium plans ==
In February 2019, a plan for a new stadium for Workington was announced. This would have involved the demolition of Borough Park and Derwent Park.

In June 2019, it was announced by the new leadership of Allerdale Borough Council that the new sports stadium would not be built.

In 2025, Cumberland Council (successor to Allerdale Council) announced that Cumberland Sports Village will be built on the site of Borough Park, being shared by Workington AFC & Workington Town. Work should be completed in summer 2027, with AFC sharing Town's Derwent Park in the interim.
