= Redheugh Park =

Football stadium in Gateshead, England

Coordinates: 54°57′08.22″N 1°37′49.86″W

- Interactive map of Redheugh Park
- Location: Gateshead, England
- Owner: Gateshead Council
- Surface: Grass
- Record attendance: 20,752

Construction
- Opened: 1930
- Renovated: 1937
- Closed: 1971
- Demolished: 1972

Tenant
- Gateshead

Redheugh Park (pronounced red-yuff) was a football stadium in Gateshead, England. The stadium was built in 1930 when South Shields F.C. moved to Gateshead from Horsley Hill and became Gateshead AFC. It was their home for more than 40 years.

The stadium offered terracing all round. The Main Stand was a two-thirds pitch length seated stand (purchased from a greyhound stadium in Carlisle) with covered standing extensions added on either side. Opposite the Main Stand was a large covered terrace that ran the full length of the ground. The North end of the ground had a small covered terrace, whilst the opposite Ropery Road (South) End was a small uncovered terrace, which latterly included a large totalisator scoreboard introduced for greyhound racing.

== History ==
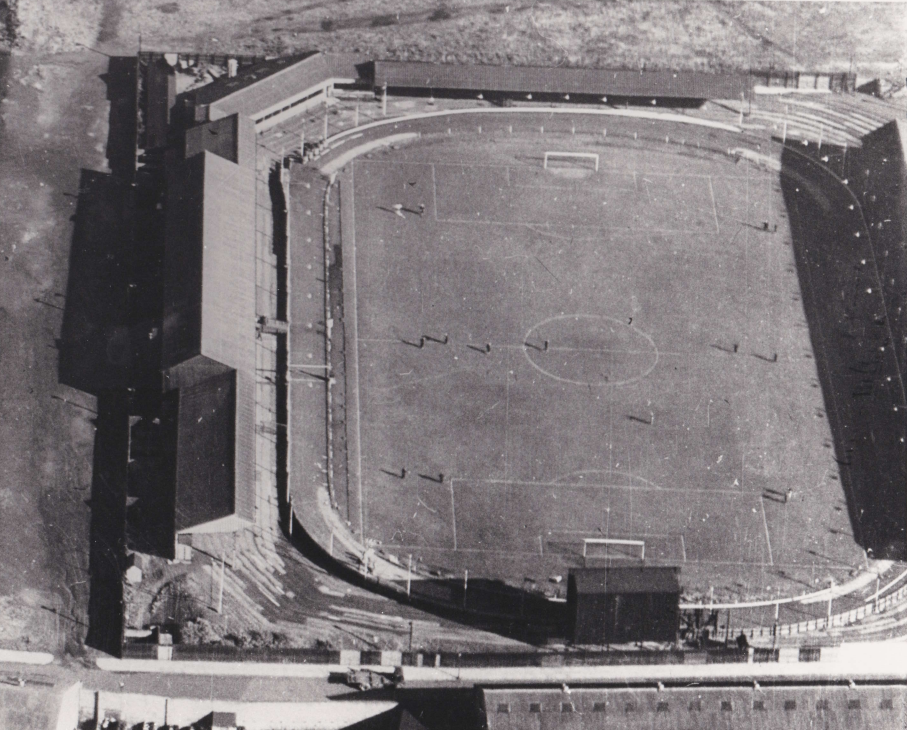
Greyhound track at Redheugh Park c.1950

In 1930 Gateshead Council set about finding a suitable site for Gateshead AFC to relocate to. Sites at Low Fell and Sheriff Hill were considered, but were deemed too far out of town. The chosen location was in the Teams area of Gateshead, a worked out clay pit (known as Johnsons Clay Hole) edged by Ropery Road and Derwentwater Road. The holes, tunnels and craters on the site were filled by lorries full of the town's refuse.

Redheugh Park was officially opened by Mr Sutcliffe, the Football League's then Vice-President on 30 August 1930 when Gateshead AFC played their first-ever Football League game winning 2–1 against Doncaster Rovers in front of 15,545 spectators. Greyhound racing at Redheugh Park commenced in 1937, which brought a boost to the football club's financial position and subsequently eased the burden for the upkeep of the stadium. However the inclusion of the Greyhound track reduced the size of the playing area, the terracing at either end of the ground and subsequently the capacity.

With the loss of Football League status in 1960 and the football club's subsequent continual slide down the leagues, a further heavy blow was dealt with the cessation of greyhound racing at the stadium in 1966. This put both Redheugh Park and Gateshead AFC in serious financial troubles. Other sources of income were investigated, which included allowing showmen to have a small fair on the car park, allowing advertising to be placed on the wall facing Askew Road (permission was refused) and even converting the refreshment bar into a transport café to catch passing trade. In 1967 Gateshead AFC made a vain attempt to fill the void the Greyhound racing had left by staging speedway racing at the stadium.

== Greyhound Racing ==
In 1937 greyhound racing was introduced to Redheugh Park and the ground underwent renovation including the reduction in size of the playing pitch. Terracing was erected all around the stadium and the main stand had its back to the Redheugh Iron and Steel works. The main stand was purchased from the Carlisle track (presumed to be the one at Harraby) and almost extended the whole length of the pitch. The first night's racing took place on 23 November 1937 organised by the Redheugh Park Greyhound Racing Company. The track was opened by Major, Alderman W J Pickering in front of an attendance of 8,000 and the first race was won by Lovely Lucerne over 450 yards.

The circumference was 370 yards and the track was to race mainly under National Greyhound Racing Club rules despite short spells as an independent track.

A totalisator board was erected on the south end terrace and tote turnover in 1947 was £686,782 a substantial amount for a capacity of 12,000. The distances changed to 440 yards and 600 yards and handicaps were very popular. The track raced under the 'combine' tag in the mid-fifties which effectively meant that they were allowed to host C-Licence owner-trainer race nights.

The greyhound racing ended on 7 January 1966.

=== Track records ===
Distance yards	Greyhound	Time	Date
440	High Ranger	26.62	23.08.1946
440	Lisanley Bobby	26.23	26.05.1948
440	Derryboy Sputnik	25.96	13.08.1959
600	Chadkirk	36.34	12.06.1948
600	Split The Pack	35.97	04.11.1958

== Closure ==
By the early 1970s Redheugh Park had become run down. This, combined with a fire in the 1971–72 season, saw Gateshead AFC move to the Gateshead Youth Stadium (now known as the Gateshead International Stadium). However the new venue proved no easier on the finances of the club, bringing the liquidation of Gateshead AFC in late August 1973. By 1972 Redheugh Park was in a derelict condition. Weed infested with crumbling terraces and dilapidated stands, it was demolished.

== Present day ==
For nearly twenty years the outlines of Redheugh Park could be made out with the terraces appearing as grass humps on the land. The area was completely leveled for the 1990 Gateshead Garden Festival and used as a car park. A few years later saw football return to the area in the shape of the Pitz 5-a-side soccer centre which was renamed Power League which is still in place today.
