= Peel Park (Accrington) =

Football stadium in Accrington, Lancashire, England

- Full name: Peel Park
- Location: Accrington, Lancashire, England
- Capacity: 9,000 (at closing); 17,634 (record attendance)

Construction
- Opened: 1919
- Closed: 1966

Tenant
- Accrington Stanley F.C. (1919–1963)

Peel Park was a football stadium in Accrington, Lancashire that was the home of Accrington Stanley F.C. between 1919 until their dissolution in 1966.

The record attendance was set in a friendly match against Blackburn Rovers on 15 November 1954 with 17,634 spectators in attendance. The record for a league match occurred against York City on 11 April 1955 with 15,425 spectators.
