= Sealand Road =

Sports stadium in Chester, England

Coordinates: 53°11′47.08″N 2°54′35.28″W

The Stadium, Sealand Road
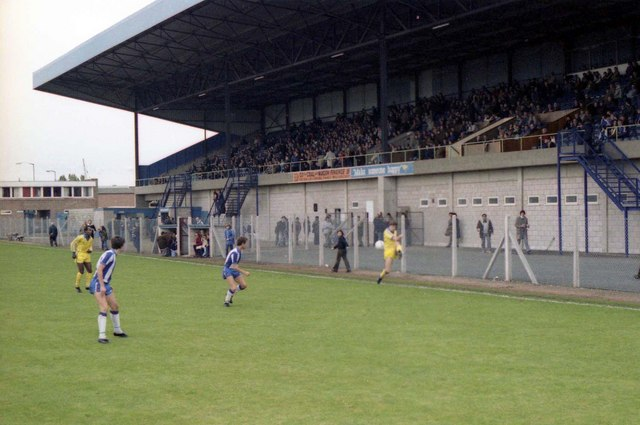
- The Main Stand, 1981

General information
- Location: Chester, England
- Completed: 1906
- Closed: 1990
- Demolished: 1992–93
- Client: Chester City F.C.

Sealand Road was the home stadium of Chester City Football Club (known until 1983 as Chester Football Club) from 1906 until 1990. Although officially known simply as The Stadium, it was more commonly referred to as Sealand Road. It was much loved by supporters of Chester, who followed their team there for 84 years, and after its closure spent an hour making the journey across Cheshire to watch their team play games at Macclesfield Town's Moss Rose ground for two years before the completion of the Deva Stadium in 1992.

== History ==
Chester moved to Sealand Road from Whipcord Lane in 1906, thanks to the help of local member of parliament Alfred Mond. The first game was on 15 December 1906, when Chester beat Bangor City 4–0 in The Combination. Over the years the stadium continued to take shape, with improved cover stands helping Chester win election to the Football League in 1931. The stadium was one of the first to have a public address system, with the matchday announcer regularly saying "Hello Spion Kop, Hello Albert". From 1990 to 2000, Chester had a fanzine called Hello Albert. Albert was believed to be a long-standing supporter.

Floodlights were installed in 1960, the 126 ft (38 m) lights being used for the first time in a 2–2 Football League Cup draw with Leyton Orient in October 1960. They were officially opened later in the season for a friendly match against Manchester United.

In 1979, the look of Sealand Road was significantly changed when a new grandstand was opened, replacing the previous small stand. Towering over the rest of the ground, the 2,874 capacity stand provided improved viewing facilities but was criticised for reducing atmosphere levels as it was detached from the rest of the stadium. The paddock area in front was not open to spectators. In the final years, the other three sides were taken up with the open Kop End (away) and covered Sealand End (home) and Popular Side (half for home fans, half for away fans).

Chester suffered a major blow in August 1989, when it was announced the club had been refused a safety certificate for its away standing areas. This reduced the capacity of the stadium to below 6,000.

This was to be Chester's last season at Sealand Road, as they were controversially moved out by their new owners and left homeless at Moss Rose, Macclesfield, for the next two seasons. The decision to leave Sealand Road was taken at relatively short notice, on 20 March 1990, when an Edinburgh-based consortium took the club over and announced its intention to redevelop Sealand Road as a supermarket, with a ground-share to take place elsewhere until a new stadium in the city was completed. Chester made approaches to numerous clubs including Manchester City, Wrexham and Tranmere Rovers in a bid to arrange a ground-share scheme for the next two seasons. Rugby league clubs Widnes and Warrington were also approached but ultimately a deal could not be made. It wasn't until 12 July that a deal with Football Conference club Macclesfield Town was struck, ending fears that Chester, then in the Third Division, could miss the deadline to find a stadium and end up being expelled from the Football League.

They returned to the city at the Deva Stadium in August 1992. They played there until they went out of business in March 2010, after which the ground was taken over by a reformed Chester club.

== Notable matches ==
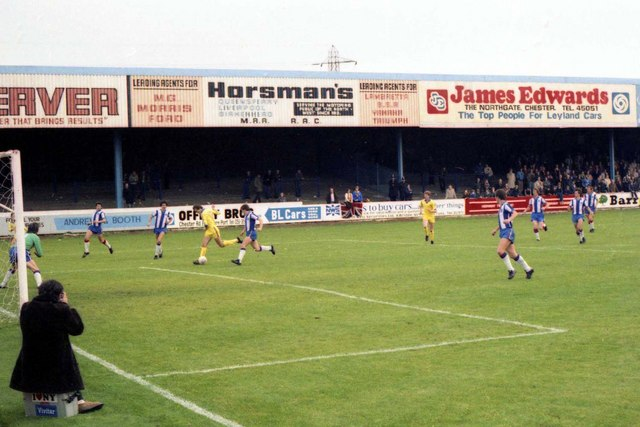
Sealand Road during a match in 1981

Although Chester have never played in the top two divisions of the English system, Sealand Road housed several prestigious games. The most memorable were in the 1974–75 season, when they reached the League Cup semi-finals. League champions Leeds United were beaten 3–0 at Sealand Road in round four, with Newcastle United losing a replay on the same ground in the quarter-finals. This led to Sealand Road being the venue for a League Cup semi-final on 15 January 1975, when Chester drew 2–2 with Aston Villa in the first-leg in front of 19,000.

The record attendance at Sealand Road was set in an FA Cup third round replay tie against Chelsea on 16 January 1952. Watched by 20,378, Chelsea won 3–2 in extra-time.

The first Football League match at the stadium saw Chester thrash Wigan Borough 4–0 on 29 August 1931, with Frank Cresswell scoring the first goal. The result was later deleted from the records as Borough resigned from the league in October, meaning the first result to stand is a 3–1 win over Halifax Town the following month.

The final Football League match was a 2–0 home win over Rotherham United on 28 April 1990, with Graham Abel scoring the final goal in front of 3,827. One of Rotherham's players that afternoon was Bobby Williamson, who later became Chester's manager. On 3 May 1990 Chester Reserves drew 3–3 with Tranmere Rovers in The Midland Senior League in the stadium's final ever game.

The stadium hosted Welsh Cup finals, including when Chester beat Wrexham in 1933, and was also often used for local cup finals and minor internationals. In 1935, the stadium famously staged an England amateur trial match involving two referees – an experiment that was largely not considered to be a success.

Chester's record Football League victory was registered at Sealand Road in February 1936, when Chester hammered York City 12–0.

The stadium was the venue for the Football League debut of a 17-year-old Ian Rush, when Chester drew 2–2 with Sheffield Wednesday in April 1979.

During its final four seasons, Sealand Road continuously hosted Third Division football, which meant that Chester enjoyed league action against a number of traditionally bigger clubs who were more familiar with the First and Second Division. Big-name opposition to visit Sealand Road included Middlesbrough, Wolverhampton Wanderers, Sunderland, Sheffield United and Birmingham City.

== Today ==
The stadium remained in place for nearly three years after Chester moved out, much to the frustration of supporters who were being forced to travel across Cheshire to watch home games at Macclesfield until the Deva Stadium was opened in August 1992. Sealand Road was allowed to fall into a state of disrepair during this period, with grass growing to a great height.

The stadium was finally demolished in 1993 and the site now houses the Sealand Road shopping park, which has nearly 740,000 square feet (69,000 m^{2}) of retail space. The stand roof was soon in use by Port Vale for their away enclosure. Chester's current Deva Stadium home is a short walk away along Bumpers Lane.
