= Feethams =

Athletics grounds in Darlington, England

Coordinates: 54°31′10″N 1°33′20″W

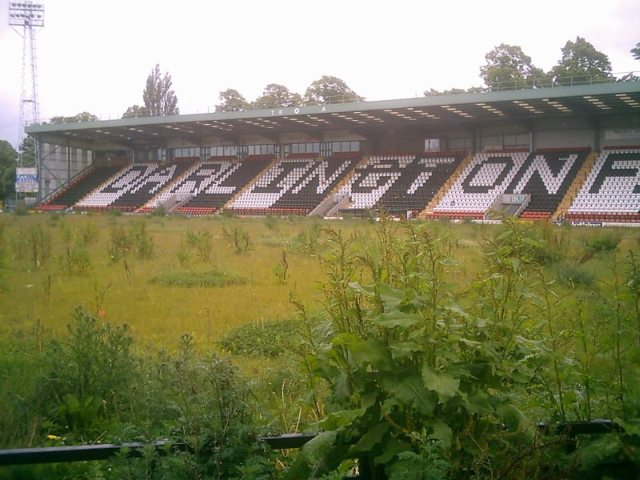
- The former football ground in 2005
- Interactive map of Feethams
- Location: Victoria Embankment, Darlington, England
- Owner: Darlington C.C.
- Operator: Darlington C.C. Darlington F.C. (former)
- Capacity: 5,000 (cricket); 8,500 (football)
- Surface: Grass
- Field size: 110 × 74 yards

Construction
- Opened: 1883 (football); 1886 (cricket)
- Renovated: 1997 (football)
- Closed: 2003 (football)
- Demolished: 2006 (football)

Tenants
- Darlington C.C. (1866-present); Darlington F.C. (1883–2003)

Feethams is a cricket and former football grounds in Darlington, north-east England. It has hosted Durham County Cricket Club matches.

Feethams was the home of Darlington Football Club from 1883 to 2003, when the club moved to the newly built Darlington Arena.The football ground was demolished in 2006, while the cricket ground remains in use.

== History ==
Feethams was the home of the Darlington Cricket Club.

From the 1860s, amateur football had been played on the site. In 1883 the newly formed Darlington F.C. made its home at Feethams.

The 1903 Deed of Foundation of the Feethams Cricket Field Trust stated that the land in question was acquired by the Trust "for the purpose of securing the said premises as an open space to be used for Cricket and other Athletic exercises".

=== Football ===
In 1907, the ground was the venue for an England Amateur international, in which the home team defeated the Netherlands 12–2. As the game is recognized as a full international by the Dutch Football Association, it remains the largest defeat ever suffered by the Dutch national team.

By the end of the 20th century, the club and the venue were in a state of flux. It was decided to build a new stadium, Darlington Arena, on a greenfield site next to the A66 bypass. The final match at Feethams was on 3 May 2003, when a capacity crowd saw Darlington come back from two goals down to draw 2–2 with Leyton Orient.

Feethams fell into disrepair. Due to low attendance at the new arena, rumours spread that it could be sold and Darlington FC could return to Feethams. The rumours proved untrue and Feethams was demolished in February 2006, shortly after an arson attack. A plan by the board of the Darlington Cricket Club to sell the former football ground for a housing development was controversial because of the conditions of the foundation document mentioned above, stating that the land was to be used as an open space for athletic exercise. Despite this, in 2009 the Board sold the football field to Esh Developments, which on-sold the land in 2013 to Persimmon Homes. In 2014, Persimmon lodged a planning application to construct 82 homes, rather than the 146 houses previously proposed.

== Cricket ==
Feethams has been the venue for many Durham County Cricket Club matches. The ground was home to Durham's first ever home victory in the County Championship, in June 1992. That match also saw the ground obtain the distinction of having the largest sightscreen in first-class cricket – the back of the Tin Shed was painted a light blue to help batsmen see the ball more easily.

== Football ==
=== Layout ===
The ground itself was a typical lower-league affair, with terraces (standing areas) and benches providing the majority of accommodation for the spectators. There were four sections: the West Stand, the East Stand, Polam Lane (South) End and the Tin Shed home terrace (the Cricket Ground End). All-seater stadiums have been compulsory in the English Premiership since the start of the 1994–95 season as a result of the Taylor Report , which gave recommendations to improve stadium safety after the Hillsborough disaster, when almost 100 fans died in a crowd crush. The East Stand was built in 1997 as an all-seater, which led to the club's financial difficulties, culminating in the chairmanship of George Reynolds, who was subsequently convicted of tax evasion.

=== Quirk ===
Feethams was unusual in that after entering the turnstiles through the Twin Towers, spectators had to walk around the cricket pitch in order to enter the football ground. The layout of Feethams gave supporters the opportunity to change ends at half time, with home supporters often seen trooping from one end to the other in order to mass behind the goal Darlington were attacking.
