= Haig Avenue =

Football stadium in Southport, England

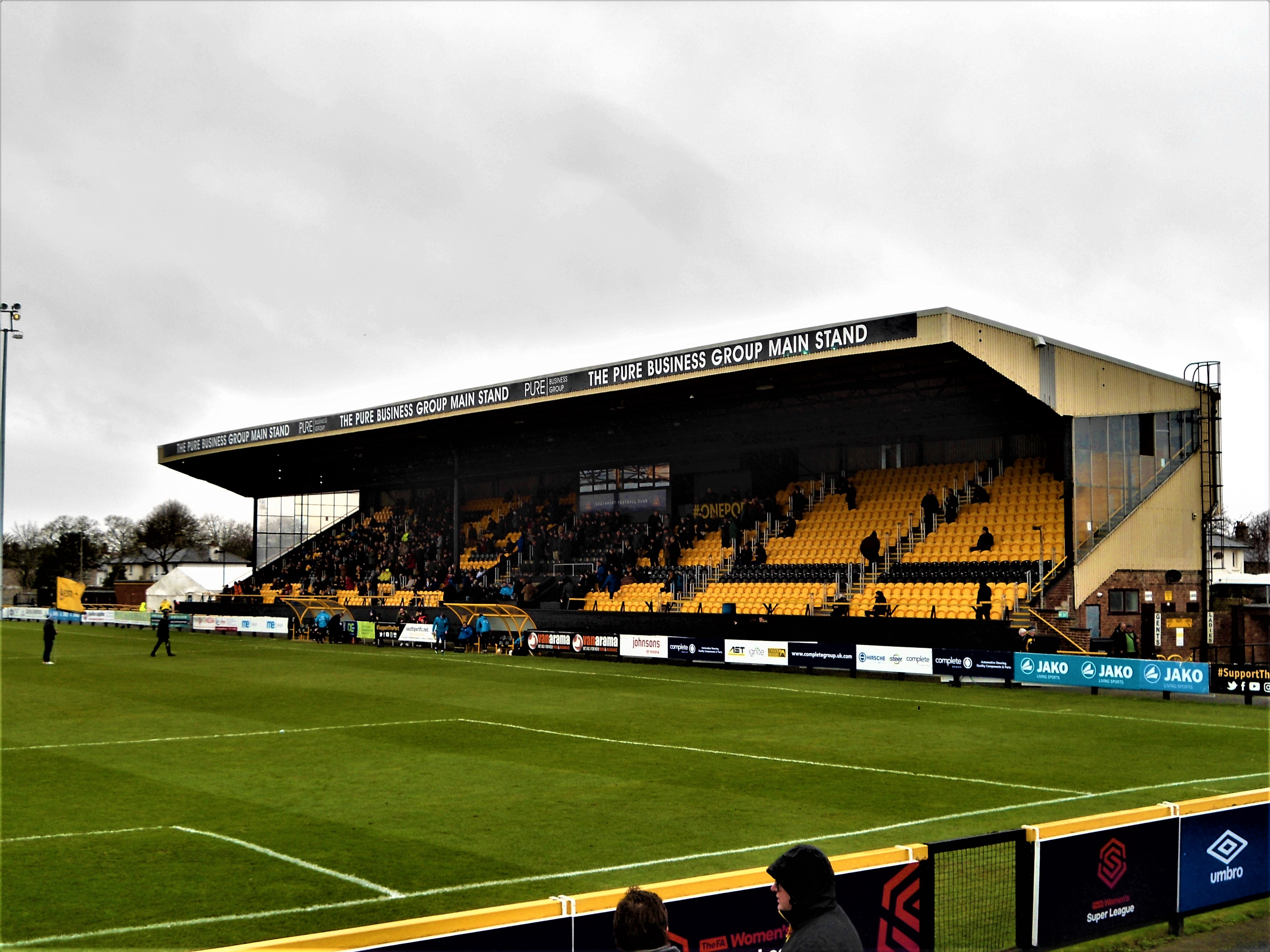

- Location in Southport
- Former names: Ash Lane (1905–1921); Merseyrail Community Stadium (2012-2019); The PURE Stadium (2019-2021); The Big Help Stadium (2023-2025)
- Location: Blowick, Southport, Merseyside, PR8 6JZ
- Coordinates: 53°38′17″N 2°58′44″W
- Owner: Sefton Council (freeholder)
- Operator: Southport F.C. (long leaseholder)
- Capacity: 6,008 (1,537 seated)
- Surface: Grass
- Field size: 115 × 78 yards

Construction
- Opened: 1905

Tenant
- Southport

Haig Avenue (also known as The Southport FC Stadium and originally known as Ash Lane) is a football stadium in Blowick, Southport, Merseyside, England, that holds 6,008 people (1,537 seated, 4,471 standing). Since its opening in 1905, it has been the home ground of Southport.

== Location ==
The ground is situated in Blowick, which is just inside the east boundary of Southport near the A570, the main road from Southport to Ormskirk and the M58 motorway. It is sited at the edge of a residential area, adjoining school playing fields.

== Stadium ==
Haig Avenue now has a capacity of 6,008 but its record attendance is 20,010 for two matches played by Southport, against Newcastle United in the fourth round of the FA Cup in 1932 and against Everton in a 1968 FA Cup tie. Since Southport lost Football League status in 1978, the ground has seldom operated at more than a quarter full, although nearly full houses were registered for key matches such as the 1998 FA Trophy semi-final against Slough Town, which Southport won to reach their first ever Wembley final, and their 2010 FA Cup third round home tie against Sheffield Wednesday.

The ground has a covered main stand on the north side of the ground (the entrance to it is from Haig Avenue, the road) called "the Sam Shrouder Main Stand". This is opposite an uncovered terrace on the south side, known as "the Poplar Terrace". Behind the goals, the west (Scarisbrick) end is covered and this is where the majority of the home fans congregate. The west stand is called the "Jack Carr Stand", after a popular director at the club, and was named shortly after his death. The east (Blowick) end, used mainly by away team supporters, is open to the elements. The north and west sides of the ground back onto residential property and the uncovered south and east sides onto the playing fields of the nearby Meols Cop High School. Haig Avenue is a thoroughfare linking Scarisbrick New Road (A570) with Meols Cop Road and Norwood Road.

There are limited car parking facilities and these are reserved for home, away and match officials. There is usually ample parking in local streets.

== History ==
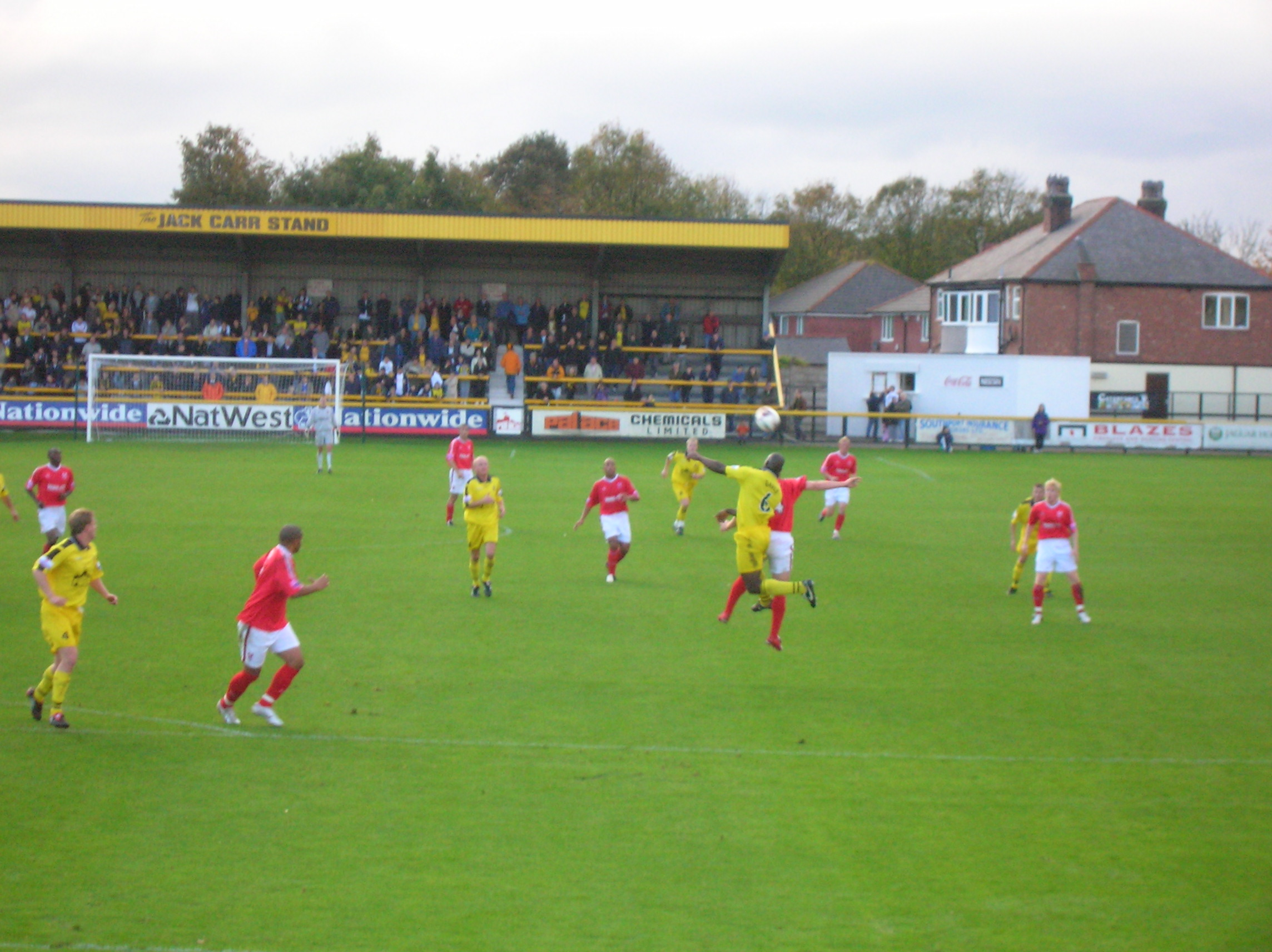
Southport (in yellow) vs Kidderminster Harriers, 2005, with the Jack Carr Stand in the background.

Southport F.C. moved to what is now called Haig Avenue in 1905 (then called Ash Lane). The road the ground is situated on and the ground itself were officially renamed Haig Avenue after Earl Haig in 1921.

The grandstand that now stands at Haig Avenue was opened in August 1968, two years after the original main stand had burnt down. The wooden structure, which had been purchased from the Southport Flower Show, caught fire on 27 December 1966, destroying the stand, dressing rooms and offices. The fire began at around 5am and destroyed most of the club's possessions, including kits, with only the club safe, holding some of the takings from the previous day's victory over Wrexham surviving. Following the fire, the club appealed for donations to help towards the £70,000 restoration costs. A temporary main stand was put up instead during the season Billy Bingham's side won promotion to the Third Division. Eric Morecambe presented the club with a trophy to commemorate their achievement.

In April 1973, following his first Grand National victory, Red Rum was presented to the crowd at half time during a match against Lincoln City.

Today there is open terracing at the "Blowick" away end and on the "Popular Side" opposite the Main Stand. Covered terracing for about 10,000 spectators on the Popular Side and Scarisbrick End was demolished following legal action against the football club by Sefton Council under the Safety of Sports Grounds legislation.

On 10 September 2012, it was announced that Merseyrail had agreed a sponsorship deal that would see Haig Avenue renamed the "Merseyrail Community Stadium".

After years of procrastination, the club said that in the summer of 2014, with the financial assistance of the Trust in Yellow supporters' trust, County Insurance and a grant from the football authorities, it would erect new corner floodlights to replace those erected along the sides of the pitch over 40 years previously. While some preparatory work on the project started in May/June 2014, just within the deadline set in the town planning conditions, the club has since revised the completion date to November 2014.

Everton Reserves currently play their home games at the stadium.

On 4 August 2019, it was announced that the stadium would now be known as The Pure Stadium after Pure Business Group offered a three-year naming deal.

It was revealed on 24 April 2023, that the charity, Big Help Project, will become a "Strategic Partner" to Southport FC, and that they are now the stadium sponsors for the 2023/24 season, which will see the Haig Avenue Stadium being renamed "The Big Help Stadium".

In May 2025, the stadium became known as The Southport FC Stadium after new owners purchased the club from The Big Help Group.

== Events ==
The ground has played host to youth internationals in the past and has also been home to both Liverpool and Everton Reserves. It has also hosted numerous FA Women's Cup ties. Everton Ladies played the first half of the 2018-19 season at the ground.

For the coronation of George VI in 1937, an estimated attendance of 15,000 packed into the ground for the celebrations.

A rugby league match took place at Haig Avenue, then known as Ash Lane, on 1 January 1909 between Widnes and Australia, during the latter's inaugural tour. Approximately 4,000 spectators saw the tourists, who had established their tour base nearby on Albert Road, win 55–3.
