= 1959–60 Chester F.C. season =

Chester
1959–60 season
- Manager: Stan Pearson
- Stadium: Sealand Road
- Football League Fourth Division: 20th
- FA Cup: Second round
- Welsh Cup: Fifth round
- Top goalscorer: League: Walter Kelly (12); All: Walter Kelly (13)
- Highest home attendance: 9,294 vs Crewe Alexandra (12 September)
- Lowest home attendance: 3,560 vs Stockport County (14 October)
- Average home league attendance: 5,421; 15th in division
Home colours

The 1959–60 season was the 22nd season of competitive association football in the Football League played by Chester, an English club based in Chester, Cheshire.

Also, it was the second season spent in the Fourth Division after its creation. Alongside competing in the Football League the club also participated in the FA Cup and the Welsh Cup.

== Football League ==
Pos	Team	Pld	W	D	L	GF	GA	GAv	Pts	Promotion or relegation
18	Barrow	46	15	11	20	77	87	0.885	41	
19	Carlisle United	46	15	11	20	51	66	0.773	41	
20	Chester	46	14	12	20	59	77	0.766	40	
21	Southport	46	10	14	22	48	92	0.522	34	Re-elected
22	Gateshead	46	12	9	25	58	86	0.674	33	Failed re-election

Source: rsssf.com

=== Results summary ===
Overall								Home						Away					
Pld	W	D	L	GF	GA	GAv	Pts	W	D	L	GF	GA	Pts	W	D	L	GF	GA	Pts
46	14	12	20	59	77	0.766	40	10	8	5	37	26	28	4	4	15	22	51	12

Source: rsssf.com

=== Results by matchday ===
Round	1	2	3	4	5	6	7	8	9	10	11	12	13	14	15	16	17	18	19	20	21	22	23	24	25	26	27	28	29	30	31	32	33	34	35	36	37	38	39	40	41	42	43	44	45	46
Result	L	L	L	L	W	W	D	L	L	D	W	D	D	L	W	L	D	W	D	W	D	W	L	W	L	W	L	D	L	W	W	L	D	L	D	L	W	W	L	W	L	L	D	L	L	D
Position	18	22	24	24	24	19	20	21	22	22	21	20	21	21	18	18	19	16	16	14	14	11	13	13	16	14	15	15	17	15	13	14	14	15	15	15	14	14	16	15	15	16	16	17	18	20

Source: statto.com
W = Win; D = Draw; L = Loss

=== Matches ===
Date	Opponents	Venue	Result	Score	Scorers	Attendance
22 August	Notts County	A	L	1–2	Davis	9,652
26 August	Carlisle United	H	L	0–1		7,800
29 August	Walsall	H	L	1–3	Davis	7,506
1 September	Carlisle United	A	L	1–2	Davis	9,344
5 September	Hartlepools United	A	W	3–2	Clempson (2), Webster	5,112
7 September	Exeter City	H	W	1–0	Bullock	6,482
12 September	Crewe Alexandra	H	D	0–0		9,294
17 September	Exeter City	A	L	0–2		7,546
19 September	Gillingham	A	L	1–3	Pimlott	7,551
23 September	Oldham Athletic	H	D	0–0		4,059
26 September	Crystal Palace	A	W	4–3	Cooper, Webster, Kelly (2)	18,312
29 September	Oldham Athletic	A	D	0–0		2,970
3 October	Bradford Park Avenue	H	D	1–1	Kelly	6,806
5 October	Stockport County	A	L	0–3		7,530
10 October	Aldershot	H	W	5–1	Pimlott (2), Foulkes, Kelly, Hunt	5,958
14 October	Stockport County	H	L	1–2	Kelly	3,560
17 October	Darlington	A	D	0–0		4,717
24 October	Gateshead	H	W	4–2	Clempson, Redhead (o.g.), Kelly, Foulkes	4,790
31 October	Rochdale	A	D	0–0		5,643
7 November	Workington	H	W	3–1	Evans, Pimlott (2)	5,019
21 November	Northampton Town	H	D	1–1	Pimlott	7,283
28 November	Torquay United	A	W	2–1	Cooper, Davis	7,034
12 December	Southport	A	L	1–3	Cooper	2,927
19 December	Notts County	H	W	2–1	Cooper, Hughes (pen.)	4,209
26 December	Barrow	A	L	0–3		6,338
28 December	Barrow	H	W	3–2	Ireland, Richards, McNab (o.g.)	4,532
2 January	Walsall	A	L	1–2	Ireland	9,751
16 January	Hartlepools United	H	D	1–1	Pimlott	4,653
23 January	Crewe Alexandra	A	L	1–2	Cooper	12,220
30 January	Millwall	H	W	2–1	Foulkes, Ireland	4,323
6 February	Gillingham	H	W	4–2	Ireland, Kelly (2), Cooper	5,022
13 February	Crystal Palace	H	L	0–1		5,132
20 February	Bradford Park Avenue	A	D	1–1	Kelly	5,167
27 February	Aldershot	A	L	2–3	Foulkes, Pimlott	5,145
5 March	Darlington	H	D	1–1	Pimlott	4,579
8 March	Doncaster Rovers	A	L	0–2		4,909
12 March	Gateshead	A	W	1–0	Kelly	1,735
19 March	Rochdale	H	W	2–1	Pimlott (2)	3,965
26 March	Workington	A	L	0–5		2,344
2 April	Doncaster Rovers	H	W	2–0	Davies, Kilkenny (o.g.)	3,862
9 April	Northampton Town	A	L	0–1		7,037
15 April	Watford	A	L	2–4	Kelly, Clempson	13,948
16 April	Torquay United	H	D	1–1	Hughes	5,928
18 April	Watford	H	L	0–1		5,962
23 April	Millwall	A	D	1–7	Brand (o.g.)	9,246
30 April	Southport	H	D	2–2	Kelly, Stopford	3,956

== FA Cup ==
Round	Date	Opponents	Venue	Result	Score	Scorers	Attendance
First round	14 November	Tranmere Rovers (3)	A	W	1–0	Kelly	14,205
Second round	5 December	Mansfield Town (3)	A	L	0–2		11,509

== Welsh Cup ==
Round	Date	Opponents	Venue	Result	Score	Scorers	Attendance
Fifth round	3 February	Holywell Town (Welsh League (North))	H	L	0–2		822

== Season statistics ==
Nat	Player	Total		League		FA Cup		Welsh Cup	
Nat	Player	A	G	A	G	A	G	A	G
Goalkeepers
(England)	Brian Biggins	1	–	–	–	–	–	1	–
(Wales)	Ron Howells	47	–	45	–	2	–	–	–
(England)	Derek Owen	1	–	1	–	–	–	–	–
Field players
(Scotland)	Jimmy Anderson	6	–	6	–	–	–	–	–
(England)	George Ashfield	1	–	–	–	–	–	1	–
	Norman Bullock	9	1	9	1	–	–	–	–
(Wales)	Jack Capper	11	–	11	–	–	–	–	–
(England)	Gerry Citron	3	–	2	–	–	–	1	–
(England)	Frank Clempson	45	4	42	4	2	–	1	–
(England)	Jim Cooper	36	6	34	6	2	–	–	–
(England)	Alec Croft	14	–	14	–	–	–	–	–
(Wales)	Ron Davies	8	1	8	1	–	–	–	–
(Wales)	Eric Davis	17	4	16	4	1	–	–	–
	Royston Evans	8	1	7	1	–	–	1	–
(Wales)	Billy Foulkes	37	4	35	4	1	–	1	–
(England)	Ray Gill	46	–	43	–	2	–	1	–
(Wales)	Ray Griffiths	3	–	3	–	–	–	–	–
(Wales)	Ron Hughes	47	2	44	2	2	–	1	–
(England)	Bobby Hunt	44	1	41	1	2	–	1	–
(England)	Jerry Ireland	14	4	14	4	–	–	–	–
	Barry Jepson	1	–	1	–	–	–	–	–
(England)	Colin Jones	3	–	3	–	–	–	–	–
	Walter Kelly	35	13	32	12	2	1	1	–
(England)	John Pimlott	33	11	31	11	2	–	–	–
(Wales)	Gordon Richards	15	1	13	1	2	–	–	–
	Bill Souter	2	–	2	–	–	–	–	–
	George Spruce	37	–	35	–	2	–	–	–
(England)	Les Stopford	4	1	4	1	–	–	–	–
	Antony Wainwright	1	–	–	–	–	–	1	–
(England)	John Walton	1	–	1	–	–	–	–	–
(England)	Harry Webster	8	2	8	2	–	–	–	–
(England)	Bobby Williams	1	–	1	–	–	–	–	–
	Own goals	–	4	–	4	–	–	–	–
	Total	49	60	46	59	2	1	1	–
