= 1958–59 Chester F.C. season =

Chester
1958–59 season
- Manager: John Harris
- Stadium: Sealand Road
- Football League Fourth Division: 13th
- FA Cup: Second round
- Welsh Cup: Sixth round
- Top goalscorer: League: Norman Bullock (12); All: Norman Bullock (13)
- Highest home attendance: 9,723 vs Northampton Town (6 September)
- Lowest home attendance: 3,220 vs Hartlepools United (8 October)
- Average home league attendance: 6,953; 14th in division
Home colours

The 1958–59 season was the 21st season of competitive association football in the Football League played by Chester, an English club based in Chester, Cheshire.

Chester competed in the newly formed Fourth Division. Alongside competing in the Football League the club also participated in the FA Cup and the Welsh Cup.

== Football League ==
Pos	Team	Pld	W	D	L	GF	GA	GAv	Pts
11	Gillingham	46	20	9	17	82	77	1.065	49
12	Torquay United	46	16	12	18	78	77	1.013	44
13	Chester	46	16	12	18	72	84	0.857	44
14	Bradford Park Avenue	46	18	7	21	75	77	0.974	43
15	Watford	46	16	10	20	81	79	1.025	42

Source: rsssf.com

=== Results summary ===
Overall								Home						Away					
Pld	W	D	L	GF	GA	GAv	Pts	W	D	L	GF	GA	Pts	W	D	L	GF	GA	Pts
46	16	12	18	72	84	0.857	44	10	5	8	39	33	25	6	7	10	33	51	19

Source: rsssf.com

=== Results by matchday ===
Round	1	2	3	4	5	6	7	8	9	10	11	12	13	14	15	16	17	18	19	20	21	22	23	24	25	26	27	28	29	30	31	32	33	34	35	36	37	38	39	40	41	42	43	44	45	46
Result	L	D	W	W	L	D	L	W	D	L	W	L	D	D	L	W	W	W	W	W	L	D	L	W	D	W	D	L	L	D	W	L	L	L	W	W	D	L	W	L	D	L	D	L	L	W
Position	19	19	12	8	11	10	16	11	14	19	15	17	17	16	16	14	13	12	10	8	12	10	11	7	10	9	8	8	9	11	9	10	12	14	12	11	12	13	11	12	12	12	12	14	15	13

Source: statto.com
W = Win; D = Draw; L = Loss

=== Matches ===
Date	Opponents	Venue	Result	Score	Scorers	Attendance
23 August	Torquay United	H	L	0–2		9,070
27 August	Crystal Palace	A	D	3–3	Pearson, Mason, Foulkes	18,170
30 August	Crewe Alexandra	A	W	4–2	Jepson (3), Richards	8,657
3 September	Crystal Palace	H	W	3–2	Mason, Pearson, Webster	7,993
6 September	Northampton Town	H	L	2–3	Bullock (2)	9,723
11 September	Walsall	A	L	2–2	Richards, Croft	11,791
13 September	Workington	A	L	0–1		5,717
17 September	Walsall	H	W	2–0	Webster (pen.), Haddington (o.g.)	7,800
20 September	York City	H	D	2–2	Mason, Richards	8,536
27 September	Bradford Park Avenue	A	L	0–3		7,274
1 October	Watford	H	W	2–1	Webster (2, 1pen.)	4,579
4 October	Port Vale	H	L	1–2	Webster	8,197
8 October	Hartlepools United	H	D	1–1	Bullock	3,220
11 October	Aldershot	H	D	2–2	Bullock, Pearson	6,655
14 October	Watford	A	L	2–4	Pearson, Bullock	7,046
18 October	Gateshead	A	W	1–0	Jepson	3,963
25 October	Oldham Athletic	H	W	5–2	Richards (2), Bullock (2), Hughes (pen.)	7,097
1 November	Barrow	A	W	2–1	Hughes (pen.), Jepson	4,333
8 November	Carlisle United	H	W	2–1	Richards, Foulkes	7,351
22 November	Exeter City	H	W	4–2	Richards, Bullock, Webster (2)	8,040
29 November	Coventry City	A	L	1–5	Pearson	15,814
13 December	Darlington	A	D	0–0		4,995
20 December	Torquay United	A	L	0–4		4,013
25 December	Millwall	A	W	1–0	Richards	9,260
27 December	Millwall	H	D	0–0		9,273
1 January	Hartlepools United	A	W	3–1	Pearson, Bullock, Foulkes	3,952
17 January	Gillingham	A	D	3–3	B. Griffiths, Bullock (2)	5,331
24 January	Shrewsbury Town	H	L	3–5	Jepson, Bullock, Richards	8,170
31 January	Workington	H	L	1–2	Foulkes	6,499
7 February	York City	A	D	1–1	Jepson	5,414
14 February	Bradford Park Avenue	H	W	2–0	Webster, Davis	6,089
21 February	Port Vale	A	L	0–4		8,851
28 February	Aldershot	A	L	0–1		4,518
7 March	Gateshead	H	L	0–1		4,881
14 March	Oldham Athletic	A	W	5–3	Foulkes (2), Davis, Pearson, Hunt	5,226
21 March	Barrow	H	W	2–0	Davis (2)	4,791
27 March	Southport	A	D	1–1	Jepson	4,384
28 March	Carlisle United	A	L	3–4	Souter, Davis, Bradley (o.g.)	4,522
30 March	Southport	H	W	2–1	Jepson, Davis	5,636
4 April	Gillingham	H	L	1–2	Davis	5,513
11 April	Exeter City	A	D	1–1	Pearson	6,464
13 April	Northampton Town	A	L	0–4		3,865
18 April	Coventry City	H	D	1–1	Farmer (o.g.)	5,920
22 April	Crewe Alexandra	H	L	0–1		9,565
25 April	Shrewsbury Town	A	L	0–3		7,260
29 April	Darlington	H	W	1–0	Webster	3,314

== FA Cup ==
Round	Date	Opponents	Venue	Result	Score	Scorers	Attendance
First round	15 November	Boston United (SFL)	H	W	3–2	Bullock, Hughes, Pearson	8,495
Second round	6 December	Bury (3)	H	D	1–1	Webster	11,606
Second round replay	9 December	Bury (3)	A	L	1–2	Hunt	15,167

== Welsh Cup ==
Round	Date	Opponents	Venue	Result	Score	Scorers	Attendance
Fifth round	21 January	Rhyl (CCL)	H	L	1–4	B. Griffiths	1,340

== Season statistics ==
Nat	Player	Total		League		FA Cup		Welsh Cup	
Nat	Player	A	G	A	G	A	G	A	G
Goalkeepers
(England)	Brian Biggins	3	–	3	–	–	–	–	–
(England)	Keith Griffiths	8	–	7	–	–	–	1	–
(Wales)	Ron Howells	38	–	35	–	3	–	–	–
(England)	Derek Owen	1	–	1	–	–	–	–	–
Field players
(Scotland)	Jimmy Anderson	15	–	14	–	–	–	1	–
(England)	George Ashfield	5	–	5	–	–	–	–	–
	Norman Bullock	39	13	35	12	3	1	1	–
(England)	Alec Croft	4	1	3	1	–	–	1	–
(Wales)	Eric Davis	15	7	15	7	–	–	–	–
	Royston Evans	1	–	1	–	–	–	–	–
(Wales)	Billy Foulkes	43	6	40	6	3	–	–	–
(England)	Ray Gill	29	–	29	–	–	–	–	–
(Wales)	Brian Griffiths	3	2	2	1	–	–	1	1
(Wales)	Ron Hughes	32	3	28	2	3	1	1	–
(England)	Bobby Hunt	39	2	36	1	3	1	–	–
(England)	Jerry Ireland	4	–	3	–	–	–	1	–
	Barry Jepson	29	9	28	9	–	–	1	–
	Jimmy Mason	38	3	35	3	3	–	–	–
(England)	Stan Pearson	35	9	32	8	3	1	–	–
(Wales)	Gordon Richards	43	9	40	9	3	–	–	–
(England)	Jack Saunders	26	–	25	–	1	–	–	–
	Bill Souter	37	1	33	1	3	–	1	–
	George Spruce	24	–	21	–	2	–	1	–
(England)	Harry Webster	28	10	26	9	2	1	–	–
	Phil Whitlock	2	–	1	–	–	–	1	–
(England)	Bobby Williams	9	–	8	–	1	–	–	–
	Own goals	–	3	–	3	–	–	–	–
	Total	50	78	46	72	3	5	1	1
