= 1957–58 Chester F.C. season =

Chester
1957–58 season
- Manager: John Harris
- Stadium: Sealand Road
- Football League Third Division North: 21st
- FA Cup: Second round
- Welsh Cup: Final
- Top goalscorer: League: Barry Jepson (23); All: Barry Jepson (30)
- Highest home attendance: 12,554 vs Wrexham (18 September)
- Lowest home attendance: 3,373 vs Accrington Stanley (30 April)
- Average home league attendance: 6,740; 16th in division
Home colours

The 1957–58 season was the 20th season of competitive association football in the Football League played by Chester, an English club based in Chester, Cheshire.

It was 20th and the last season spent in the Third Division North as at the end of the season Third Division sections were merged into nationwide Third and Fourth divisions. As Chester finished in the bottom half of the table, the club was transferred to the Fourth Division. Alongside competing in the Football League, the club also participated in the FA Cup and the Welsh Cup.

== Football League ==
Pos	Team	Pld	W	D	L	GF	GA	GAv	Pts	Promotion or relegation
19	Workington	46	14	13	19	72	81	0.889	41	Moved to 4th Division
20	Darlington	46	17	7	22	78	89	0.876	41	Moved to 4th Division
21	Chester	46	13	13	20	73	81	0.901	39	Moved to 4th Division
22	Bradford Park Avenue	46	13	11	22	68	95	0.716	37	Moved to 4th Division
23	Southport	46	11	6	29	52	88	0.591	28	Re-elected, moved to 4th Division

Source: rsssf.com

=== Results summary ===
Overall								Home						Away					
Pld	W	D	L	GF	GA	GAv	Pts	W	D	L	GF	GA	Pts	W	D	L	GF	GA	Pts
46	13	13	20	73	81	0.901	39	7	10	6	38	26	24	6	3	14	35	55	15

Source: rsssf.com

=== Results by matchday ===
Round	1	2	3	4	5	6	7	8	9	10	11	12	13	14	15	16	17	18	19	20	21	22	23	24	25	26	27	28	29	30	31	32	33	34	35	36	37	38	39	40	41	42	43	44	45	46
Result	L	W	L	W	L	L	L	L	D	W	W	D	L	L	W	L	D	L	L	L	D	W	D	W	D	L	D	L	W	W	L	L	D	D	D	W	W	L	D	D	D	W	L	L	L	W
Position	19	12	13	10	16	17	18	21	21	21	15	16	18	21	20	21	21	22	22	22	22	22	22	21	22	22	22	22	21	20	20	22	22	22	21	20	19	19	19	20	21	19	21	21	21	21

Source: statto.com
W = Win; D = Draw; L = Loss

=== Matches ===
Date	Opponents	Venue	Result	Score	Scorers	Attendance
24 August	Tranmere Rovers	H	L	1–3	B. Williams	11,572
28 August	Crewe Alexandra	H	W	3–2	Jepson (2), Gor. Davies	7,736
31 August	Hartlepools United	A	L	1–2	Mason	11,629
2 September	Crewe Alexandra	A	W	3–0	Jepson (2), Mason	8,323
7 September	Bradford Park Avenue	H	L	1–2	Jepson (pen.)	8,353
11 September	Wrexham	A	L	0–1		11,754
14 September	Carlisle United	A	L	2–3	Foulkes, Smith	8,754
18 September	Wrexham	H	L	0–1		12,554
21 September	Southport	H	D	1–1	Bullock	6,454
28 September	York City	A	W	2–1	A. Williams, Hughes	7,103
30 September	Accrington Stanley	A	W	2–1	Gor. Davies (2)	7,404
5 October	Barrow	H	D	2–2	Hughes, Saunders	7,142
12 October	Darlington	H	L	0–1		6,852
19 October	Halifax Town	A	L	1–2	Bullock	5,042
26 October	Stockport County	H	W	3–0	Bullock, Jepson, Gor. Davies	7,518
2 November	Hull City	A	L	0–3		11,732
9 November	Bradford City	H	D	0–0		6,453
23 November	Mansfield Town	H	L	1–2	Foulkes	7,096
30 November	Gateshead	A	L	2–3	Pearson, Gor. Davies	3,844
14 December	Scunthorpe & Lindsey United	H	L	1–2	Bullock	4,604
21 December	Tranmere Rovers	A	D	2–2	Jepson (2)	9,794
25 December	Bury	A	W	2–1	Jepson, Bullock	11,031
26 December	Bury	H	D	0–0		9,771
28 December	Hartlepools United	H	W	2–1	Saunders (2)	7,725
4 January	Oldham Athletic	H	D	0–0		6,159
11 January	Bradford Park Avenue	A	L	0–3		7,341
18 January	Carlisle United	H	D	0–0		4,949
25 January	Workington	A	L	3–5	Jepson, Mason, Evans	3,813
1 February	Southport	A	W	4–2	Jepson, Ireland, Pearson, Richards	3,693
8 February	York City	H	W	9–4	Jepson (5), Evans, Brown (o.g.), Richards, Ireland	5,217
15 February	Barrow	A	L	1–4	Pearson	4,271
22 February	Mansfield Town	A	L	1–3	Mellor (o.g.)	7,603
1 March	Halifax Town	H	D	1–1	Ireland	6,304
8 March	Stockport County	A	D	2–2	Ireland, Richards	7,629
15 March	Hull City	H	D	1–1	Hughes (pen.)	5,721
22 March	Darlington	A	W	3–2	Jepson (2), Richards	4,376
29 March	Workington	H	W	4–3	Jepson (2), Richards, Pearson	4,905
4 April	Chesterfield	A	L	1–2	Pearson	9,156
5 April	Rochdale	A	D	1–1	Whitlock	3,273
7 April	Chesterfield	H	D	0–0		6,360
12 April	Gateshead	H	D	1–1	Pearson	4,752
16 April	Rochdale	H	W	2–0	Hughes (pen.), Mason	3,449
19 April	Bradford City	A	L	0–5		9,232
22 April	Oldham Athletic	A	L	1–5	Jepson	8,396
26 April	Scunthorpe & Lindsey United	A	L	1–2	Pearson	10,403
30 April	Accrington Stanley	H	W	5–1	Jepson (2), Richards, Bullock, Pearson	3,373

== FA Cup ==
Round	Date	Opponents	Venue	Result	Score	Scorers	Attendance
First round	16 November	Gateshead (3N)	H	W	4–3	Pearson, Foulkes, Jepson, Mason	7,539
Second round	7 December	Bradford City (3N)	H	D	3–3	Jepson (3)	8,435
Second round replay	11 December	Bradford City (3N)	A	L	1–3	Jepson	5,281

== Welsh Cup ==
Round	Date	Opponents	Venue	Result	Score	Scorers	Attendance
Fifth round	30 January	Oswestry Town (B&DL)	A	W	3–1	Ireland, Tomley (o.g.), Smith	
Quarterfinal	5 March	Swansea Town (2)	H	W	2–0	Bullock, Hughes	1,872
Semifinal	19 March	Hereford United (SFL)	N	D	1–1	Jepson	2,538
Semifinal replay	24 March	Hereford United (SFL)	N	W	2–0	Jepson, Ireland	877
Final	7 May	Wrexham (3N)	H	D	1–1	Hughes (pen.)	7,742
Final replay	10 May	Wrexham (3N)	A	L	1–2	Evans	7,542

== Season statistics ==
Nat	Player	Total		League		FA Cup		Welsh Cup	
Nat	Player	A	G	A	G	A	G	A	G
Goalkeepers
(England)	Brian Biggins	4	–	2	–	–	–	2	–
(England)	Keith Griffiths	47	–	41	–	2	–	4	–
(England)	Bobby Jones	4	–	3	–	1	–	-	–
Field players
(Scotland)	Jimmy Anderson	50	–	42	–	3	–	5	–
	Norman Bullock	28	7	19	6	3	–	6	1
(England)	Alec Croft	1	–	-	–	–	–	1	–
(England)	George Davies	2	–	2	–	–	–	-	–
	Gordon Davies	25	5	22	5	2	–	1	–
	Royston Evans	20	3	15	2	–	–	5	1
	Mike Fields	5	–	5	–	–	–	-	–
(Wales)	Billy Foulkes	40	3	36	2	3	1	1	–
(England)	Ray Gill	35	–	30	–	2	–	3	–
	Malcolm Handscombe	5	–	4	–	–	–	1	–
(Wales)	Ron Hughes	55	6	46	4	3	–	6	2
(England)	Jerry Ireland	19	6	15	4	–	–	4	2
	Barry Jepson	51	30	42	23	3	5	6	2
	Jimmy Mason	33	5	29	4	2	1	2	–
(England)	Stan Pearson	32	9	25	8	2	1	5	–
(Wales)	Gordon Richards	17	6	17	6	–	–	-	–
(England)	Jack Saunders	50	3	42	3	3	–	5	–
(England)	Harry Smith	5	2	4	1	–	–	1	1
	Bill Souter	20	–	16	–	1	–	3	–
	Phil Whitlock	12	1	9	1	1	–	2	–
	Aled Williams	38	1	33	1	2	–	3	–
(England)	Bobby Williams	7	1	7	1	–	–	-	–
	Own goals	–	3	–	2	–	–	–	1
	Total	55	91	46	73	3	8	6	10
