= 1934 in association football =

The following are the football (soccer) events of the year 1934 throughout the world.

== Events ==
- January 6: Steve Milton of Halifax Town sets an English league record by conceding 13 goals on his league debut for the club. The Third Division (North) match finished: Stockport County 13:0 Halifax Town.
- March 3: The highest ever English attendance for a non-Cup Final of 84,569 sees Manchester City F.C. beat Stoke City F.C. 1-0 at Maine Road in the sixth round of the FA Cup.

== Winners club national championship ==
- Argentina: Boca Juniors
- France: FC Sète
- Iceland: KR
- Italy: Juventus
- Netherlands: Ajax Amsterdam
- Poland: Ruch Chorzów
- Portugal: FC Porto
- Romania: Venus București
- Scotland: Rangers
- Spain: Athletic Bilbao
- Turkey: Beşiktaş J.K.

== International tournaments ==
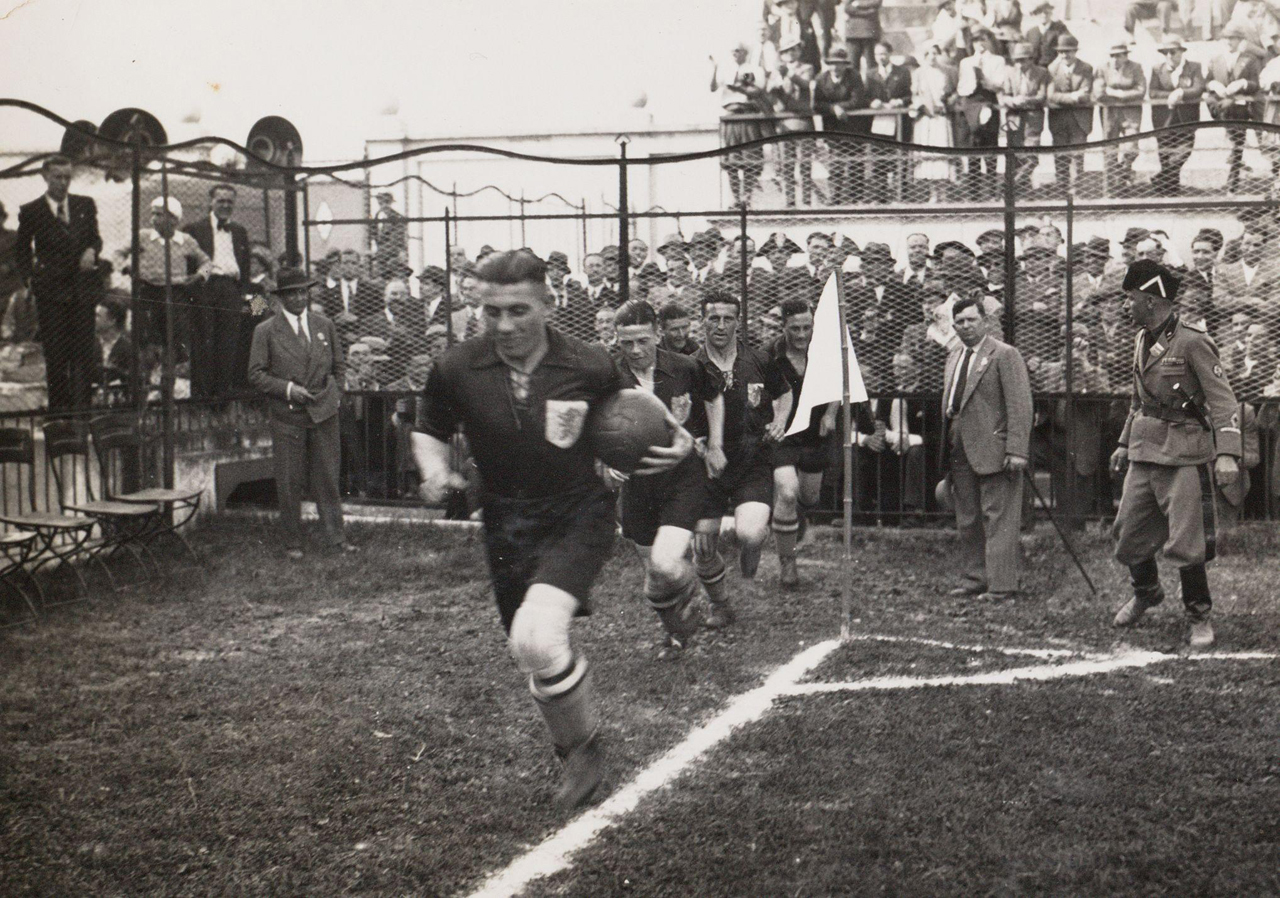
Holland - Switzerland, FIFA World Cup.

- 1934 British Home Championship (16 September 1933 – 14 April 1934)

Wales

- FIFA World Cup in Italy (May 27 – June 10, 1934)
  1. Italy
  2. Czechoslovakia
  3. Germany

== Births ==
- January 6 – Earl Godding, Welsh former professional footballer
- January 11 – Kwee Kiat Sek, Indonesian footballer
- January 21 – Alfonso Portugal, Mexican international footballer (died 2016)
- March 23 – Adel Hekal, Egyptian footballer (died 2018)
- March 28 – Kazimír Gajdoš, Slovak international footballer (died 2016)
- April 15 – David Herd, Scottish international footballer (died 2016)
- April 25 – Peter McParland, Irish footballer
- May 26 – Ray Faulkner, English former professional footballer
- June 24 – Ferdinand Biwersi, German referee (died 2013)
- June 28 – Alfred Pyka, German international footballer (died 2012)
- July 5 – Vladislao Cap, Argentine international footballer and manager (died 1982)
- June 29
  - Malcolm Handscombe, English association footballer
  - Bob Wilson, Scottish association football player
- July 30 – Engelbert Kraus, German international footballer (died 2016)
- August 1 – Fernand Boone, Belgian international footballer (died 2013)
- August 17 – Ron Henry, English international footballer (died 2014)
- August 23 – Flavio Emoli, Italian international footballer (died 2015)
- August 29 – Horst Szymaniak, German international footballer (died 2009)
- September 11 – Harry Clark, English professional footballer (died 2017)
- October 8 – Martin Lippens, Belgian international footballer (died 2016)
- October 10 – Ben Newton, English professional footballer
- October 28 – Max Mayunga, Belgian-Congolese footballer
- November 14 – Dave Mackay, Scottish international footballer and manager (died 2015)
- November 18 – Bert Gebbie, Scottish former professional footballer
- November 19 – Kurt Hamrin, Swedish international footballer
- November 27 – Ammo Baba, Assyrian soccer player (died 2009)
- December 21 – Ole Madsen, Danish international footballer (died 2006)

== Deaths ==
- 6 January - Herbert Chapman, manager of Arsenal and formerly of Huddersfield Town.

== Established ==
- Beitar Tal Aviv - Israeli club
- Maccabi Netanya - Israeli club
- Peterborough United - English club
