= List of people from Chester =

Notable people from Chester, England

A list of notable people from Chester, England.

See Category:People from Chester

== A ==
- Russ Abbot, actor, musician.

== B ==
- Reg Barton, footballer
- Diana Beck, neurosurgeon.
- Stan Bennion, footballer.
- Chris Blackburn, footballer
- Emily Booth, actress
- Grenville Booth, footballer
- Sir Adrian Boult (1889–1983), orchestral conductor.
- Thomas Brassey, civil engineer, railway contractor
- David Brett, footballer
- Oswald Walters Brierly, Marine painter to Queen Victoria
- Robert Butt, footballer

== C ==
- Hall Caine, (1853–1931), writer
- Randolph Caldecott, illustrator and artist
- Thomas E. Caldecott, politician
- Ray Carter, footballer
- Mark Cartwright, footballer
- Hugh B. Cave, author
- Gerald Cavendish Grosvenor, Duke of Westminster
- Mike Cecere, footballer
- Dave Challinor, footballer
- Ron Chesterman, musician
- Nigel Clutton, footballer
- Danny Collins (footballer), footballer
- Alec Croft, footballer
- Brian Croft, footballer
- Daniel Craig, actor (James Bond series)
- Emma Cunniffe, actress

== D ==
- John Douglas, (1830–1911), architect

== E ==
- Simon Edge, novelist
- Lloyd Ellams, footballer
- David Evans (footballer)
- David Evans (political official)
- Robert Evans (footballer born 1885)

== F ==
- Tony Field (footballer born 1942)
- Mike Fields, footballer
- Graham, Paul, and Ron Futcher, brothers who all played professional football

== G ==
- Keith Griffiths, footballer

== H ==
- Albert and Les Harley, footballing brothers
- Thomas Harrison, architect
- Tom Heaton, footballer
- Malcolm Hebden, actor
- Joe Hewitt, footballer
- Randle Holme - name shared by four successive generations of a family of herald painters
- A. S. Hornby, lexicographer
- Barry Horne, footballer
- Robert Spear Hudson (businessman)
- Tom Hughes, actor

== I ==
- Jerry Ireland, footballer

== J ==
- Eddie Johnson (English footballer)
- Caroline Jones (fundraiser)
- Colin Jones (footballer)
- Gary Jones (footballer born 1975)
- Ray Jones (footballer born 1944)
- Mike Jones (referee)

== K ==
- Hugh de Kevelioc, 3rd Earl of Chester

== L ==
- Lee Latchford-Evans, singer
- Eric Lee (footballer)
- Bert Lipsham, footballer
- Hugh Lloyd, actor
- Frank Eric Lloyd, author of Rhodesian Patrol

== M ==
- Levi Mackin, footballer
- George Mainwaring, merchant, mayor and MP
- Lucy Meacock, broadcaster
- Bob Mills (comedian)
- Helen Modern, actress
- William Monk, etcher, woodcut engraver and painter
- Steve Moore (footballer)
- Alan Morris (footballer)
- Jill Morris, diplomat
- William De Morgan, potter and tile designer
- Spangles Muldoon, DJ
- Danny Murphy (footballer born 1977), footballer

== O ==
- Stephen Oliver, composer
- Michael Owen, footballer

== P ==
- Mike Parry, broadcaster
- Ronald Pickup, actor
- John Port (the elder), judge
- Gary Potter, footballer
- Graham Pugh, footballer

== R ==
- Basil Radford, actor
- Paul Raynor (footballer born 1957)
- Bill Rigby footballer
- L. T. C. Rolt, biographer, engineer, writer and canal enthusiast
- Gary Roberts (footballer born 1984)
- Gary Roberts (footballer born 1987)
- Martin Roscoe (b. 1952), classical pianist
- Adam Rickitt (singer and actor)

== S ==
- Ian Saltmarsh (1901–1970), cricketer.
- Alex Sanderson, Rugby union player
- Harry Smith, footballer
- George Spruce, footballer
- John Steiner, actor
- Ryan Shawcross, footballer

== T ==
- John Thompson (1870–1945), cricketer.
- Anthony Thwaite, poet
- Charles John Tibbits, journalist, newspaper editor, author, and legal writer
- Beatrice Tinsley, cosmologist
- Beth Tweddle, gymnast
- Martin Tyler, football commentator

== V ==
- Danny Ventre, footballer

== W ==
- Robert Wilcox (martyr)
- Helen Willetts, weather presenter and former international badminton player
- Brian Woodall, footballer
