= Godding =

Godding is a surname. Notable people with the surname include:

- Brian Godding (1945–2023), Welsh musician
- Earl Godding (born 1934), Welsh football player
- George Godding (1896–1960), Welsh football player
- Henri Godding (1892–1980), Belgian middle-distance runner
- Keith Godding (born 1984), Canadian football player

== See also ==
- Sonia Godding Togobo, Guyanese-Canadian documentary filmmaker and editor
- Philippe Goddin (1944–2025), Belgian literary critic and author
