= Gordon Davies =

Gordon Davies may refer to:

- Gordon Davies (footballer, born 1955), Welsh international football player
- Gordon Davies (footballer, born 1932) (1932–2020), English football player (Chester City)
- Gordon Leslie Herries Davies (1932–2019), British and Irish geographer
- Gordon Davies (Coronation Street), a character on the British soap opera Coronation Street
