= Aled Williams =

Aled Williams may refer to:

- Aled Williams (footballer) (1933–2005)
- Aled Williams (rugby union) (born 1964)
