= 1933–34 Football League =

42nd season of the Football League

The Football League
- Season: 1933–34
- Champions: Arsenal

The 1933–34 season was the 42nd season of the Football League.

== Final league tables ==
The tables and results below are reproduced here in the exact form that they can be found at The Rec.Sport.Soccer Statistics Foundation website and in Rothmans Book of Football League Records 1888–89 to 1978–79, with home and away statistics separated.

Beginning with the season 1894–95, clubs finishing level on points were separated according to goal average (goals scored divided by goals conceded), or more properly put, goal ratio. In case one or more teams had the same goal difference, this system favoured those teams who had scored fewer goals. The goal average system was eventually scrapped beginning with the 1976–77 season. From the 1922–23 season on, re-election was required of the bottom two teams of both Third Division North and Third Division South.

== First Division ==
First Division
- Season: 1933–34
- Champions: Arsenal; 3rd English title
- Relegated: Newcastle United; Sheffield United
- Matches: 462
- Goals: 1,524 (3.3 per match)
- Top goalscorer: Jack Bowers (34 goals)
- Biggest home win: Wolverhampton Wanderers 8–0 Manchester City (23 December 1933); Leeds United 8–0 Leicester City (7 April 1934)
- Biggest away win: Wolverhampton Wanderers 1–6 Sunderland (9 September 1933); Manchester City 2–7 West Bromwich Albion (1 January 1934)
- Highest scoring: Middlesbrough 10–3 Sheffield United (18 November 1933)

| Pos | Team | Pld | W | D | L | GF | GA | GAv | Pts | Relegation |
|---|---|---|---|---|---|---|---|---|---|---|
| 1 | Arsenal (C) | 42 | 25 | 9 | 8 | 75 | 47 | 1.596 | 59 | |
| 2 | Huddersfield Town | 42 | 23 | 10 | 9 | 90 | 61 | 1.475 | 56 | |
| 3 | Tottenham Hotspur | 42 | 21 | 7 | 14 | 79 | 56 | 1.411 | 49 | |
| 4 | Derby County | 42 | 17 | 11 | 14 | 68 | 54 | 1.259 | 45 | |
| 5 | Manchester City | 42 | 17 | 11 | 14 | 65 | 72 | 0.903 | 45 | |
| 6 | Sunderland | 42 | 16 | 12 | 14 | 81 | 56 | 1.446 | 44 | |
| 7 | West Bromwich Albion | 42 | 17 | 10 | 15 | 78 | 70 | 1.114 | 44 | |
| 8 | Blackburn Rovers | 42 | 18 | 7 | 17 | 74 | 81 | 0.914 | 43 | |
| 9 | Leeds United | 42 | 17 | 8 | 17 | 75 | 66 | 1.136 | 42 | |
| 10 | Portsmouth | 42 | 15 | 12 | 15 | 52 | 55 | 0.945 | 42 | |
| 11 | Sheffield Wednesday | 42 | 16 | 9 | 17 | 62 | 67 | 0.925 | 41 | |
| 12 | Stoke City | 42 | 15 | 11 | 16 | 58 | 71 | 0.817 | 41 | |
| 13 | Aston Villa | 42 | 14 | 12 | 16 | 78 | 75 | 1.040 | 40 | |
| 14 | Everton | 42 | 12 | 16 | 14 | 62 | 63 | 0.984 | 40 | |
| 15 | Wolverhampton Wanderers | 42 | 14 | 12 | 16 | 74 | 86 | 0.860 | 40 | |
| 16 | Middlesbrough | 42 | 16 | 7 | 19 | 68 | 80 | 0.850 | 39 | |
| 17 | Leicester City | 42 | 14 | 11 | 17 | 59 | 74 | 0.797 | 39 | |
| 18 | Liverpool | 42 | 14 | 10 | 18 | 79 | 87 | 0.908 | 38 | |
| 19 | Chelsea | 42 | 14 | 8 | 20 | 67 | 69 | 0.971 | 36 | |
| 20 | Birmingham | 42 | 12 | 12 | 18 | 54 | 56 | 0.964 | 36 | |
| 21 | Newcastle United (R) | 42 | 10 | 14 | 18 | 68 | 77 | 0.883 | 34 | Relegation to the Second Division |
| 22 | Sheffield United (R) | 42 | 12 | 7 | 23 | 58 | 101 | 0.574 | 31 | Relegation to the Second Division |

Source: World Football
Rules for classification: 1) Points; 2) Goal average; 3) Goals scored
(C) Champions; (R) Relegated

=== Results ===
| Home \ Away | ARS | AST | BIR | BLB | CHE | DER | EVE | HUD | LEE | LEI | LIV | MCI | MID | NEW | POR | SHU | SHW | STK | SUN | TOT | WBA | WOL |
|---|---|---|---|---|---|---|---|---|---|---|---|---|---|---|---|---|---|---|---|---|---|---|
| Arsenal | | 3–2 | 1–1 | 2–1 | 2–1 | 1–0 | 1–2 | 3–1 | 2–0 | 2–0 | 2–1 | 1–1 | 6–0 | 3–0 | 1–1 | 2–0 | 1–1 | 3–0 | 2–1 | 1–3 | 3–1 | 3–2 |
| Aston Villa | 2–3 | | 1–1 | 1–1 | 2–0 | 0–2 | 2–1 | 4–3 | 3–0 | 2–3 | 4–2 | 0–0 | 3–0 | 2–3 | 1–1 | 3–0 | 1–0 | 1–2 | 2–1 | 1–5 | 4–4 | 6–2 |
| Birmingham | 0–0 | 0–0 | | 2–0 | 0–3 | 2–1 | 2–2 | 1–3 | 4–0 | 3–0 | 1–2 | 0–1 | 0–0 | 1–2 | 3–1 | 4–2 | 3–0 | 0–1 | 1–1 | 2–0 | 0–1 | 0–0 |
| Blackburn Rovers | 2–2 | 2–1 | 3–1 | | 4–2 | 2–1 | 1–1 | 2–2 | 4–2 | 3–0 | 3–1 | 3–0 | 0–0 | 3–2 | 3–2 | 3–1 | 3–1 | 4–1 | 0–0 | 1–0 | 4–0 | 7–1 |
| Chelsea | 2–2 | 1–0 | 1–1 | 3–0 | | 0–2 | 2–0 | 2–3 | 1–1 | 2–0 | 2–0 | 1–2 | 2–3 | 2–1 | 4–0 | 5–0 | 0–1 | 2–0 | 4–0 | 0–4 | 3–2 | 5–2 |
| Derby County | 2–4 | 1–1 | 4–0 | 1–1 | 1–0 | | 1–1 | 1–1 | 3–1 | 2–1 | 3–1 | 4–1 | 2–0 | 1–1 | 0–1 | 5–1 | 1–1 | 5–1 | 0–0 | 4–3 | 1–1 | 3–1 |
| Everton | 3–1 | 2–2 | 2–0 | 7–1 | 2–1 | 0–3 | | 0–1 | 2–0 | 1–1 | 0–0 | 2–0 | 1–1 | 3–7 | 1–1 | 4–0 | 2–3 | 2–2 | 1–0 | 1–1 | 1–0 | 1–2 |
| Huddersfield Town | 0–1 | 2–1 | 0–0 | 5–3 | 6–1 | 2–0 | 1–0 | | 0–0 | 5–1 | 0–2 | 1–0 | 2–1 | 4–1 | 4–0 | 6–1 | 3–2 | 2–2 | 2–1 | 2–0 | 3–1 | 3–1 |
| Leeds United | 0–1 | 2–4 | 1–0 | 4–0 | 3–1 | 0–2 | 2–2 | 1–1 | | 8–0 | 5–1 | 3–1 | 5–2 | 3–0 | 1–0 | 1–1 | 2–1 | 2–0 | 3–1 | 0–0 | 3–0 | 3–3 |
| Leicester City | 4–1 | 1–1 | 3–7 | 1–2 | 1–1 | 2–0 | 3–1 | 1–0 | 2–2 | | 1–0 | 0–0 | 1–2 | 3–2 | 2–1 | 4–0 | 2–0 | 3–1 | 0–0 | 1–3 | 0–1 | 1–1 |
| Liverpool | 2–3 | 2–3 | 4–1 | 4–0 | 3–0 | 4–2 | 3–2 | 2–2 | 4–3 | 1–3 | | 3–2 | 6–2 | 1–2 | 2–2 | 3–2 | 1–3 | 1–1 | 1–1 | 3–1 | 1–1 | 1–1 |
| Manchester City | 2–1 | 1–0 | 1–0 | 3–1 | 4–2 | 2–0 | 2–2 | 2–2 | 0–1 | 1–1 | 2–1 | | 5–2 | 1–1 | 2–1 | 4–1 | 2–3 | 4–2 | 4–1 | 2–0 | 2–7 | 4–0 |
| Middlesbrough | 0–2 | 1–2 | 0–3 | 3–1 | 2–2 | 3–1 | 2–0 | 3–0 | 2–1 | 4–1 | 4–1 | 2–1 | | 1–0 | 2–0 | 10–3 | 2–3 | 6–1 | 0–4 | 1–1 | 3–0 | 0–0 |
| Newcastle United | 0–1 | 1–1 | 0–0 | 3–1 | 2–2 | 1–1 | 1–2 | 3–3 | 2–0 | 1–1 | 9–2 | 2–2 | 1–1 | | 2–2 | 3–1 | 0–0 | 2–2 | 2–1 | 1–3 | 1–2 | 5–1 |
| Portsmouth | 1–0 | 3–2 | 0–2 | 2–0 | 0–2 | 1–0 | 0–0 | 3–0 | 2–1 | 3–5 | 1–0 | 2–0 | 4–1 | 2–0 | | 1–1 | 0–2 | 3–1 | 0–0 | 0–1 | 2–2 | 1–1 |
| Sheffield United | 1–3 | 3–3 | 2–1 | 1–0 | 4–1 | 2–0 | 1–1 | 1–4 | 2–1 | 2–1 | 2–2 | 1–1 | 3–1 | 4–0 | 0–1 | | 5–1 | 1–2 | 2–0 | 0–0 | 0–1 | 3–1 |
| Sheffield Wednesday | 1–2 | 1–2 | 2–1 | 4–0 | 2–1 | 1–1 | 0–0 | 1–2 | 0–2 | 1–1 | 1–2 | 1–1 | 3–0 | 3–1 | 1–2 | 0–1 | | 2–2 | 2–0 | 2–1 | 3–1 | 2–1 |
| Stoke City | 1–1 | 1–1 | 1–1 | 2–0 | 1–0 | 0–4 | 1–2 | 3–0 | 1–2 | 2–1 | 1–1 | 0–1 | 2–0 | 2–1 | 2–1 | 3–0 | 0–1 | | 3–0 | 2–0 | 4–1 | 1–1 |
| Sunderland | 3–0 | 5–1 | 4–1 | 3–0 | 0–0 | 0–0 | 3–2 | 1–1 | 4–2 | 2–1 | 4–1 | 0–0 | 2–0 | 2–0 | 0–2 | 5–0 | 4–0 | 4–1 | | 6–0 | 2–2 | 3–3 |
| Tottenham Hotspur | 1–1 | 3–2 | 3–2 | 4–1 | 2–1 | 1–2 | 3–0 | 1–3 | 5–1 | 0–1 | 0–3 | 5–1 | 2–0 | 4–0 | 0–0 | 4–1 | 4–3 | 0–0 | 3–1 | | 2–1 | 4–0 |
| West Bromwich Albion | 1–0 | 2–1 | 1–2 | 0–1 | 3–1 | 5–1 | 3–3 | 2–3 | 0–3 | 2–0 | 2–2 | 4–0 | 3–0 | 1–1 | 2–1 | 3–0 | 1–1 | 5–1 | 6–5 | 1–2 | | 2–0 |
| Wolverhampton Wanderers | 0–1 | 4–3 | 2–0 | 5–3 | 1–1 | 3–0 | 2–0 | 5–2 | 2–0 | 1–1 | 3–2 | 8–0 | 0–1 | 2–1 | 1–1 | 3–2 | 6–2 | 0–2 | 1–6 | 1–0 | 0–0 | |

Updated to match(es) played on unknown. Source:
Legend: Blue = home team win; Yellow = draw; Red = away team win.

=== Maps ===
Locations of the Football League First Division London teams
Locations of the Football League First Division teams

== Second Division ==
Second Division
- Season: 1933–34
- Champions: Grimsby Town
- Promoted: Grimsby Town; Preston North End
- Relegated: Millwall; Lincoln City
- Matches: 462
- Goals: 1,441 (3.12 per match)
- Top goalscorer: Pat Glover (42 goals)
- Biggest home win: Grimsby Town 7–0 Blackpool (28 April 1934); Oldham Athletic 7–0 Hull City (28 April 1934)
- Biggest away win: Oldham Athletic 1–5 Grimsby Town (2 September 1933); Bolton Wanderers 0–4 Grimsby Town (4 September 1933); Manchester United 1–5 Bolton Wanderers (9 September 1933); Manchester United 0–4 Bradford Park Avenue (24 February 1934)
- Highest scoring: Grimsby Town 7–3 Manchester United (26 October 1933)

| Pos | Team | Pld | W | D | L | GF | GA | GAv | Pts | Promotion or relegation |
|---|---|---|---|---|---|---|---|---|---|---|
| 1 | Grimsby Town (C, P) | 42 | 27 | 5 | 10 | 103 | 59 | 1.746 | 59 | Promotion to the First Division |
| 2 | Preston North End (P) | 42 | 23 | 6 | 13 | 71 | 52 | 1.365 | 52 | Promotion to the First Division |
| 3 | Bolton Wanderers | 42 | 21 | 9 | 12 | 79 | 55 | 1.436 | 51 | |
| 4 | Brentford | 42 | 22 | 7 | 13 | 85 | 60 | 1.417 | 51 | |
| 5 | Bradford (Park Avenue) | 42 | 23 | 3 | 16 | 86 | 67 | 1.284 | 49 | |
| 6 | Bradford City | 42 | 20 | 6 | 16 | 73 | 67 | 1.090 | 46 | |
| 7 | West Ham United | 42 | 17 | 11 | 14 | 78 | 70 | 1.114 | 45 | |
| 8 | Port Vale | 42 | 19 | 7 | 16 | 60 | 55 | 1.091 | 45 | |
| 9 | Oldham Athletic | 42 | 17 | 10 | 15 | 72 | 60 | 1.200 | 44 | |
| 10 | Plymouth Argyle | 42 | 15 | 13 | 14 | 69 | 70 | 0.986 | 43 | |
| 11 | Blackpool | 42 | 15 | 13 | 14 | 62 | 64 | 0.969 | 43 | |
| 12 | Bury | 42 | 17 | 9 | 16 | 70 | 73 | 0.959 | 43 | |
| 13 | Burnley | 42 | 18 | 6 | 18 | 60 | 72 | 0.833 | 42 | |
| 14 | Southampton | 42 | 15 | 8 | 19 | 54 | 58 | 0.931 | 38 | |
| 15 | Hull City | 42 | 13 | 12 | 17 | 52 | 68 | 0.765 | 38 | |
| 16 | Fulham | 42 | 15 | 7 | 20 | 48 | 67 | 0.716 | 37 | |
| 17 | Nottingham Forest | 42 | 13 | 9 | 20 | 73 | 74 | 0.986 | 35 | |
| 18 | Notts County | 42 | 12 | 11 | 19 | 53 | 62 | 0.855 | 35 | |
| 19 | Swansea Town | 42 | 10 | 15 | 17 | 51 | 60 | 0.850 | 35 | |
| 20 | Manchester United | 42 | 14 | 6 | 22 | 59 | 85 | 0.694 | 34 | |
| 21 | Millwall (R) | 42 | 11 | 11 | 20 | 39 | 68 | 0.574 | 33 | Relegation to the Third Division South |
| 22 | Lincoln City (R) | 42 | 9 | 8 | 25 | 44 | 75 | 0.587 | 26 | Relegation to the Third Division North |

Rules for classification: 1) Points; 2) Goal average; 3) Goals scored
(C) Champions; (P) Promoted; (R) Relegated

=== Results ===
| Home \ Away | BLP | BOL | BRA | BPA | BRE | BUR | BRY | FUL | GRI | HUL | LIN | MUN | MIL | NOT | NTC | OLD | PLY | PTV | PNE | SOU | SWA | WHU |
|---|---|---|---|---|---|---|---|---|---|---|---|---|---|---|---|---|---|---|---|---|---|---|
| Blackpool | | 1–1 | 3–2 | 1–1 | 3–1 | 1–1 | 2–0 | 4–3 | 3–4 | 0–0 | 2–0 | 3–1 | 2–2 | 2–3 | 2–1 | 0–0 | 1–1 | 1–0 | 1–2 | 4–2 | 2–1 | 1–1 |
| Bolton Wanderers | 1–2 | | 3–0 | 0–1 | 3–2 | 4–1 | 2–0 | 3–1 | 0–4 | 3–3 | 1–2 | 3–1 | 5–0 | 1–1 | 1–0 | 1–0 | 2–0 | 3–0 | 0–2 | 2–0 | 2–1 | 5–1 |
| Bradford City | 1–0 | 5–1 | | 3–0 | 2–1 | 2–1 | 2–2 | 1–0 | 2–1 | 1–2 | 3–0 | 1–1 | 1–0 | 3–2 | 3–1 | 5–2 | 3–4 | 1–2 | 1–0 | 2–2 | 2–1 | 2–2 |
| Bradford Park Avenue | 1–2 | 1–4 | 2–1 | | 5–2 | 5–0 | 0–1 | 3–1 | 2–1 | 3–1 | 2–1 | 6–1 | 4–0 | 6–2 | 3–2 | 4–2 | 4–1 | 2–2 | 2–1 | 3–1 | 5–1 | 0–0 |
| Brentford | 1–0 | 3–1 | 2–1 | 2–0 | | 5–2 | 2–3 | 1–2 | 1–2 | 2–2 | 5–0 | 3–4 | 3–0 | 2–1 | 2–2 | 2–1 | 3–0 | 2–0 | 3–2 | 2–0 | 2–0 | 4–1 |
| Burnley | 3–2 | 1–3 | 4–2 | 1–0 | 3–1 | | 1–2 | 2–1 | 2–0 | 3–1 | 3–1 | 1–4 | 2–1 | 1–0 | 1–0 | 0–1 | 2–2 | 0–0 | 1–4 | 2–1 | 3–1 | 4–2 |
| Bury | 2–5 | 1–1 | 1–0 | 2–1 | 1–2 | 1–1 | | 3–3 | 1–3 | 3–1 | 0–2 | 2–1 | 5–1 | 4–2 | 3–1 | 1–1 | 4–0 | 0–3 | 2–1 | 1–0 | 4–1 | 2–1 |
| Fulham | 1–0 | 0–2 | 0–1 | 0–2 | 1–1 | 1–1 | 2–1 | | 1–0 | 1–1 | 1–0 | 0–2 | 2–0 | 3–1 | 3–0 | 1–2 | 3–2 | 3–0 | 1–0 | 1–0 | 1–0 | 3–1 |
| Grimsby Town | 7–0 | 2–3 | 1–4 | 3–2 | 2–2 | 1–0 | 2–0 | 3–1 | | 4–1 | 3–0 | 7–3 | 5–2 | 2–1 | 2–2 | 2–1 | 5–1 | 1–2 | 3–0 | 3–1 | 3–1 | 1–1 |
| Hull City | 3–0 | 1–0 | 2–2 | 1–2 | 0–1 | 0–1 | 3–1 | 0–0 | 0–1 | | 2–0 | 4–1 | 3–2 | 2–2 | 0–1 | 2–0 | 5–4 | 2–1 | 0–1 | 1–0 | 0–0 | 2–0 |
| Lincoln City | 2–2 | 2–2 | 0–1 | 2–1 | 0–2 | 4–0 | 1–2 | 5–0 | 3–3 | 2–1 | | 5–1 | 0–1 | 0–0 | 0–1 | 1–1 | 1–1 | 1–0 | 0–1 | 1–1 | 1–0 | 0–2 |
| Manchester United | 2–0 | 1–5 | 2–1 | 0–4 | 1–3 | 5–2 | 2–1 | 1–0 | 1–3 | 4–1 | 1–1 | | 1–1 | 0–1 | 1–2 | 2–3 | 0–3 | 2–0 | 1–0 | 1–0 | 1–1 | 0–1 |
| Millwall | 0–0 | 2–1 | 1–1 | 0–1 | 2–0 | 0–0 | 0–0 | 0–1 | 0–1 | 2–0 | 4–1 | 0–2 | | 0–0 | 3–2 | 1–0 | 0–0 | 0–3 | 1–1 | 1–0 | 2–1 | 2–2 |
| Nottingham Forest | 0–0 | 2–2 | 1–2 | 3–0 | 1–1 | 0–2 | 7–2 | 2–0 | 4–2 | 0–1 | 6–2 | 1–1 | 2–0 | | 2–0 | 1–3 | 2–1 | 6–1 | 2–3 | 4–1 | 4–2 | 0–1 |
| Notts County | 1–1 | 1–2 | 3–0 | 1–0 | 1–2 | 3–1 | 2–1 | 4–1 | 1–2 | 0–0 | 2–0 | 0–0 | 0–1 | 1–0 | | 1–1 | 2–1 | 3–2 | 2–2 | 2–2 | 1–1 | 1–2 |
| Oldham Athletic | 2–0 | 1–3 | 4–3 | 1–3 | 1–4 | 1–0 | 2–2 | 2–2 | 1–5 | 7–0 | 3–0 | 2–0 | 1–0 | 4–1 | 2–0 | | 1–1 | 5–1 | 3–1 | 1–1 | 0–0 | 4–1 |
| Plymouth Argyle | 0–3 | 3–0 | 3–0 | 4–1 | 1–1 | 1–0 | 3–3 | 4–0 | 0–2 | 1–1 | 3–0 | 4–0 | 1–0 | 4–3 | 1–0 | 1–0 | | 3–0 | 0–0 | 0–0 | 2–2 | 4–4 |
| Port Vale | 1–0 | 0–0 | 3–1 | 3–1 | 1–0 | 0–2 | 4–1 | 2–2 | 0–1 | 3–0 | 1–0 | 2–3 | 5–1 | 3–1 | 0–0 | 2–0 | 4–0 | | 2–0 | 2–1 | 1–0 | 0–0 |
| Preston North End | 3–0 | 1–1 | 0–1 | 3–1 | 3–2 | 3–2 | 0–3 | 2–0 | 1–2 | 5–0 | 2–1 | 3–2 | 4–2 | 4–0 | 2–0 | 1–0 | 1–1 | 0–0 | | 3–1 | 3–0 | 3–1 |
| Southampton | 3–2 | 1–0 | 4–1 | 5–0 | 0–0 | 2–1 | 1–0 | 2–0 | 4–2 | 1–1 | 3–1 | 1–0 | 2–3 | 2–0 | 3–2 | 1–0 | 0–1 | 1–4 | 0–1 | | 1–0 | 3–2 |
| Swansea Town | 2–2 | 0–0 | 2–1 | 5–1 | 2–3 | 3–0 | 1–1 | 1–0 | 1–1 | 1–1 | 1–0 | 2–1 | 2–0 | 1–1 | 1–1 | 2–2 | 2–1 | 4–0 | 1–2 | 1–0 | | 1–1 |
| West Ham United | 1–2 | 4–2 | 1–2 | 0–1 | 3–2 | 1–2 | 3–1 | 5–1 | 3–1 | 2–1 | 4–1 | 2–1 | 1–1 | 2–1 | 5–3 | 1–4 | 5–1 | 1–0 | 6–0 | 0–0 | 1–1 | |

Updated to match(es) played on unknown. Source: Ian Laschke: Rothmans Book of Football League Records 1888–89 to 1978–79. Macdonald and Jane’s, London & Sydney, 1980.
Legend: Blue = home team win; Yellow = draw; Red = away team win.

=== Maps ===
Locations of the Football League Second Division London teams
Locations of the Football League Second Division teams

== Third Division North ==
Football League Third Division North
- Season: 1933–34
- Champions: Barnsley (1st title)
- Failed re-election: None
- Matches: 462
- Goals: 1,800 (3.9 per match)
- Top goalscorer: Alf Lythgoe (Stockport County), 46

| Pos | Team | Pld | W | D | L | GF | GA | GAv | Pts | Promotion |
|---|---|---|---|---|---|---|---|---|---|---|
| 1 | Barnsley (C, P) | 42 | 27 | 8 | 7 | 118 | 61 | 1.934 | 62 | Promotion to the Second Division |
| 2 | Chesterfield | 42 | 27 | 7 | 8 | 86 | 43 | 2.000 | 61 | |
| 3 | Stockport County | 42 | 24 | 11 | 7 | 115 | 52 | 2.212 | 59 | |
| 4 | Walsall | 42 | 23 | 7 | 12 | 97 | 60 | 1.617 | 53 | |
| 5 | Doncaster Rovers | 42 | 22 | 9 | 11 | 83 | 61 | 1.361 | 53 | |
| 6 | Wrexham | 42 | 23 | 5 | 14 | 102 | 73 | 1.397 | 51 | |
| 7 | Tranmere Rovers | 42 | 20 | 7 | 15 | 84 | 63 | 1.333 | 47 | |
| 8 | Barrow | 42 | 19 | 9 | 14 | 116 | 94 | 1.234 | 47 | |
| 9 | Halifax Town | 42 | 20 | 4 | 18 | 80 | 91 | 0.879 | 44 | |
| 10 | Chester | 42 | 17 | 6 | 19 | 89 | 86 | 1.035 | 40 | |
| 11 | Hartlepools United | 42 | 16 | 7 | 19 | 89 | 93 | 0.957 | 39 | |
| 12 | York City | 42 | 15 | 8 | 19 | 71 | 74 | 0.959 | 38 | |
| 13 | Carlisle United | 42 | 15 | 8 | 19 | 66 | 81 | 0.815 | 38 | |
| 14 | Crewe Alexandra | 42 | 15 | 6 | 21 | 81 | 97 | 0.835 | 36 | |
| 15 | New Brighton | 42 | 14 | 8 | 20 | 62 | 87 | 0.713 | 36 | |
| 16 | Darlington | 42 | 13 | 9 | 20 | 70 | 101 | 0.693 | 35 | |
| 17 | Mansfield Town | 42 | 11 | 12 | 19 | 81 | 88 | 0.920 | 34 | |
| 18 | Southport | 42 | 8 | 17 | 17 | 63 | 90 | 0.700 | 33 | |
| 19 | Gateshead | 42 | 12 | 9 | 21 | 76 | 110 | 0.691 | 33 | |
| 20 | Accrington Stanley | 42 | 13 | 7 | 22 | 65 | 101 | 0.644 | 33 | |
| 21 | Rotherham United | 42 | 10 | 8 | 24 | 53 | 91 | 0.582 | 28 | Re-elected |
| 22 | Rochdale | 42 | 9 | 6 | 27 | 53 | 103 | 0.515 | 24 | Re-elected |

Source: rsssf.com
(C) Champions; (P) Promoted

=== Results ===
| Home \ Away | ACC | BAR | BRW | CRL | CHE | CHF | CRE | DAR | DON | GAT | HAL | HAR | MAN | NWB | ROC | ROT | SOU | STP | TRA | WAL | WRE | YOR |
|---|---|---|---|---|---|---|---|---|---|---|---|---|---|---|---|---|---|---|---|---|---|---|
| Accrington Stanley | | 0–9 | 0–4 | 2–1 | 4–1 | 1–0 | 0–2 | 2–0 | 4–1 | 5–2 | 1–1 | 2–2 | 1–1 | 8–0 | 1–3 | 2–2 | 3–2 | 0–3 | 2–2 | 1–0 | 1–1 | 4–1 |
| Barnsley | 6–0 | | 3–1 | 1–0 | 2–0 | 3–2 | 5–2 | 4–0 | 2–2 | 0–0 | 1–0 | 5–4 | 6–1 | 2–0 | 4–1 | 5–1 | 3–2 | 2–0 | 5–1 | 1–1 | 3–0 | 1–0 |
| Barrow | 2–6 | 3–4 | | 2–0 | 9–0 | 2–0 | 0–3 | 5–2 | 2–1 | 12–1 | 5–2 | 2–2 | 6–3 | 3–3 | 5–3 | 4–1 | 3–3 | 2–0 | 1–3 | 5–5 | 3–1 | 2–2 |
| Carlisle United | 3–0 | 1–4 | 0–0 | | 1–0 | 1–1 | 6–1 | 3–3 | 0–1 | 6–0 | 1–0 | 4–1 | 3–2 | 1–2 | 3–0 | 0–1 | 0–0 | 2–2 | 2–1 | 3–2 | 0–0 | 3–2 |
| Chester | 7–0 | 4–2 | 1–3 | 3–3 | | 3–2 | 1–0 | 8–0 | 3–1 | 4–0 | 1–2 | 3–3 | 1–1 | 0–0 | 7–1 | 5–1 | 1–0 | 1–1 | 4–2 | 0–1 | 1–2 | 1–1 |
| Chesterfield | 1–0 | 3–0 | 2–1 | 4–0 | 6–1 | | 3–2 | 0–1 | 1–1 | 6–2 | 4–2 | 3–1 | 3–2 | 4–0 | 3–0 | 2–1 | 2–1 | 1–0 | 1–0 | 1–2 | 4–0 | 2–0 |
| Crewe Alexandra | 4–2 | 4–2 | 1–3 | 4–0 | 3–5 | 1–2 | | 2–3 | 4–0 | 3–2 | 1–1 | 1–0 | 2–1 | 6–2 | 4–1 | 0–2 | 2–2 | 2–2 | 3–1 | 1–4 | 1–0 | 5–3 |
| Darlington | 3–1 | 0–4 | 4–1 | 1–2 | 0–4 | 1–1 | 1–1 | | 4–0 | 3–3 | 4–2 | 5–3 | 1–4 | 1–0 | 1–1 | 4–1 | 4–0 | 1–2 | 1–3 | 2–1 | 2–1 | 4–0 |
| Doncaster Rovers | 5–1 | 4–4 | 3–2 | 2–1 | 3–1 | 1–3 | 4–0 | 3–2 | | 5–2 | 3–0 | 3–0 | 1–0 | 1–0 | 5–0 | 2–1 | 3–0 | 0–2 | 2–0 | 4–0 | 1–4 | 3–1 |
| Gateshead | 2–0 | 1–4 | 0–0 | 2–3 | 1–3 | 2–1 | 2–1 | 2–2 | 2–4 | | 4–0 | 6–3 | 5–3 | 6–0 | 2–1 | 4–1 | 2–2 | 0–4 | 1–2 | 2–1 | 0–3 | 0–2 |
| Halifax Town | 2–1 | 1–1 | 4–1 | 3–2 | 1–0 | 5–0 | 3–2 | 2–0 | 0–1 | 2–4 | | 6–2 | 4–2 | 1–1 | 4–2 | 3–2 | 6–2 | 4–2 | 0–2 | 2–0 | 1–3 | 3–0 |
| Hartlepool | 3–0 | 0–2 | 7–0 | 3–2 | 1–0 | 0–3 | 2–1 | 6–2 | 2–2 | 3–3 | 5–0 | | 3–1 | 2–1 | 2–1 | 4–0 | 1–2 | 3–1 | 1–1 | 0–1 | 4–1 | 2–0 |
| Mansfield Town | 5–0 | 1–5 | 0–5 | 6–0 | 2–1 | 0–3 | 4–1 | 4–0 | 1–1 | 1–1 | 6–1 | 1–1 | | 5–2 | 5–0 | 3–0 | 2–2 | 1–1 | 0–0 | 1–2 | 1–1 | 0–2 |
| New Brighton | 0–3 | 0–1 | 2–2 | 2–1 | 0–2 | 0–0 | 2–1 | 3–2 | 2–2 | 3–1 | 3–0 | 4–1 | 5–1 | | 0–2 | 3–1 | 5–2 | 2–1 | 1–0 | 2–0 | 0–1 | 2–1 |
| Rochdale | 0–1 | 3–1 | 1–2 | 0–1 | 6–0 | 0–1 | 2–0 | 1–0 | 0–2 | 2–0 | 1–2 | 3–0 | 2–2 | 1–1 | | 0–2 | 3–3 | 1–1 | 1–0 | 3–3 | 1–2 | 3–6 |
| Rotherham United | 3–1 | 0–2 | 1–1 | 0–1 | 0–3 | 1–3 | 3–4 | 0–0 | 0–0 | 3–2 | 1–2 | 4–2 | 1–2 | 2–2 | 4–0 | | 0–1 | 1–1 | 2–2 | 1–1 | 1–3 | 3–2 |
| Southport | 1–1 | 2–2 | 1–3 | 1–1 | 3–1 | 0–0 | 1–1 | 3–2 | 0–0 | 1–1 | 1–4 | 0–2 | 3–3 | 4–0 | 3–0 | 4–0 | | 1–4 | 2–2 | 3–1 | 1–1 | 0–0 |
| Stockport County | 3–0 | 1–1 | 4–1 | 4–0 | 4–2 | 0–0 | 1–1 | 6–0 | 4–3 | 1–0 | 13–0 | 5–2 | 3–1 | 5–1 | 4–1 | 3–1 | 9–2 | | 2–1 | 3–2 | 7–3 | 2–1 |
| Tranmere | 2–0 | 5–2 | 4–1 | 3–1 | 6–1 | 0–1 | 5–1 | 2–2 | 2–0 | 2–1 | 3–2 | 3–2 | 3–2 | 1–0 | 4–0 | 1–2 | 5–0 | 1–1 | | 1–0 | 1–2 | 3–0 |
| Walsall | 5–0 | 5–1 | 2–4 | 3–2 | 5–0 | 2–2 | 5–1 | 3–0 | 2–0 | 5–1 | 2–0 | 5–0 | 0–0 | 2–1 | 2–0 | 3–1 | 4–1 | 2–0 | 5–3 | | 3–1 | 1–0 |
| Wrexham | 3–2 | 4–2 | 3–2 | 8–1 | 0–3 | 2–3 | 5–1 | 6–1 | 1–1 | 2–3 | 0–2 | 3–1 | 5–0 | 5–4 | 4–1 | 4–0 | 2–1 | 0–1 | 5–1 | 4–2 | | 2–3 |
| York City | 3–2 | 1–1 | 6–1 | 4–1 | 3–2 | 1–2 | 4–1 | 1–1 | 1–2 | 1–1 | 1–0 | 1–3 | 1–0 | 2–1 | 6–1 | 0–1 | 1–0 | 2–2 | 1–0 | 2–2 | 2–4 | |

Updated to match(es) played on unknown. Source: Ian Laschke: Rothmans Book of Football League Records 1888–89 to 1978–79. Macdonald and Jane’s, London & Sydney, 1980.
Legend: Blue = home team win; Yellow = draw; Red = away team win.

=== Maps ===
Locations of the Football League Third Division North teams

== Third Division South ==
Football League Third Division South
- Season: 1933–34
- Champions: Norwich City (1st title)
- Failed re-election: None
- Matches: 462
- Goals: 1,526 (3.3 per match)
- Top goalscorer: Albert Dawes (Northampton Town and Crystal Palace), 27

| Pos | Team | Pld | W | D | L | GF | GA | GAv | Pts | Promotion |
|---|---|---|---|---|---|---|---|---|---|---|
| 1 | Norwich City (C, P) | 42 | 25 | 11 | 6 | 88 | 49 | 1.796 | 61 | Promotion to the Second Division |
| 2 | Coventry City | 42 | 21 | 12 | 9 | 100 | 54 | 1.852 | 54 | |
| 3 | Reading | 42 | 21 | 12 | 9 | 82 | 50 | 1.640 | 54 | |
| 4 | Queens Park Rangers | 42 | 24 | 6 | 12 | 70 | 51 | 1.373 | 54 | |
| 5 | Charlton Athletic | 42 | 22 | 8 | 12 | 83 | 56 | 1.482 | 52 | |
| 6 | Luton Town | 42 | 21 | 10 | 11 | 83 | 61 | 1.361 | 52 | |
| 7 | Bristol Rovers | 42 | 20 | 11 | 11 | 77 | 47 | 1.638 | 51 | |
| 8 | Swindon Town | 42 | 17 | 11 | 14 | 64 | 68 | 0.941 | 45 | |
| 9 | Exeter City | 42 | 16 | 11 | 15 | 68 | 57 | 1.193 | 43 | |
| 10 | Brighton & Hove Albion | 42 | 15 | 13 | 14 | 68 | 60 | 1.133 | 43 | |
| 11 | Clapton Orient | 42 | 16 | 10 | 16 | 75 | 69 | 1.087 | 42 | |
| 12 | Crystal Palace | 42 | 16 | 9 | 17 | 71 | 67 | 1.060 | 41 | |
| 13 | Northampton Town | 42 | 14 | 12 | 16 | 71 | 78 | 0.910 | 40 | |
| 14 | Aldershot | 42 | 13 | 12 | 17 | 52 | 71 | 0.732 | 38 | |
| 15 | Watford | 42 | 15 | 7 | 20 | 71 | 63 | 1.127 | 37 | |
| 16 | Southend United | 42 | 12 | 10 | 20 | 51 | 74 | 0.689 | 34 | |
| 17 | Gillingham | 42 | 11 | 11 | 20 | 75 | 96 | 0.781 | 33 | |
| 18 | Newport County | 42 | 8 | 17 | 17 | 49 | 70 | 0.700 | 33 | |
| 19 | Bristol City | 42 | 10 | 13 | 19 | 58 | 85 | 0.682 | 33 | |
| 20 | Torquay United | 42 | 13 | 7 | 22 | 53 | 93 | 0.570 | 33 | |
| 21 | Bournemouth & Boscombe Athletic | 42 | 9 | 9 | 24 | 60 | 102 | 0.588 | 27 | Re-elected |
| 22 | Cardiff City | 42 | 9 | 6 | 27 | 57 | 105 | 0.543 | 24 | Re-elected |

(C) Champions; (P) Promoted

=== Results ===
| Home \ Away | ALD | B&BA | B&HA | BRI | BRR | CAR | CHA | CLA | COV | CRY | EXE | GIL | LUT | NPC | NOR | NWC | QPR | REA | STD | SWI | TOR | WAT |
|---|---|---|---|---|---|---|---|---|---|---|---|---|---|---|---|---|---|---|---|---|---|---|
| Aldershot | | 0–0 | 0–1 | 2–2 | 0–1 | 1–3 | 3–2 | 0–0 | 1–1 | 0–4 | 0–2 | 0–2 | 0–0 | 3–2 | 1–1 | 2–1 | 3–1 | 3–0 | 2–0 | 1–2 | 3–0 | 3–2 |
| Bournemouth & Boscombe Athletic | 1–2 | | 1–1 | 5–0 | 2–0 | 1–3 | 1–2 | 2–0 | 3–3 | 1–1 | 1–3 | 1–1 | 4–3 | 0–0 | 4–0 | 2–4 | 3–2 | 1–1 | 1–4 | 1–1 | 3–4 | 3–2 |
| Brighton & Hove Albion | 3–1 | 6–0 | | 5–1 | 0–2 | 4–0 | 1–0 | 0–0 | 1–1 | 4–1 | 2–1 | 5–2 | 1–1 | 1–1 | 3–3 | 1–1 | 0–1 | 1–1 | 1–0 | 3–0 | 3–1 | 2–0 |
| Bristol City | 1–1 | 3–1 | 5–0 | | 0–3 | 3–0 | 0–1 | 3–0 | 0–0 | 2–2 | 1–1 | 1–1 | 0–0 | 1–1 | 2–3 | 0–1 | 0–2 | 1–2 | 5–1 | 2–2 | 2–0 | 1–0 |
| Bristol Rovers | 4–1 | 3–0 | 1–1 | 5–1 | | 3–1 | 2–5 | 2–2 | 4–1 | 0–1 | 1–1 | 4–2 | 0–1 | 2–0 | 1–1 | 3–0 | 4–1 | 1–0 | 3–1 | 3–0 | 2–1 | 1–0 |
| Cardiff City | 1–2 | 4–2 | 1–4 | 1–5 | 1–5 | | 1–1 | 1–2 | 3–3 | 4–0 | 2–1 | 1–3 | 0–4 | 1–1 | 1–3 | 0–2 | 3–1 | 2–0 | 1–1 | 0–1 | 0–1 | 4–1 |
| Charlton Athletic | 1–0 | 4–3 | 4–3 | 2–1 | 2–1 | 2–0 | | 1–1 | 2–0 | 4–2 | 4–1 | 2–2 | 2–0 | 6–1 | 1–1 | 3–3 | 1–2 | 0–0 | 1–3 | 1–0 | 6–0 | 4–3 |
| Clapton Orient | 9–2 | 4–1 | 2–1 | 4–0 | 0–0 | 4–2 | 1–3 | | 0–0 | 2–0 | 4–0 | 2–1 | 1–1 | 3–0 | 5–1 | 3–2 | 2–2 | 2–3 | 5–2 | 1–0 | 4–1 | 2–3 |
| Coventry City | 5–1 | 4–1 | 2–0 | 9–0 | 5–3 | 4–1 | 3–2 | 3–1 | | 5–1 | 1–3 | 7–1 | 2–2 | 5–2 | 3–1 | 0–0 | 0–1 | 0–0 | 2–0 | 5–1 | 3–1 | 2–0 |
| Crystal Palace | 4–1 | 4–1 | 2–1 | 0–1 | 1–2 | 3–2 | 1–0 | 3–2 | 2–1 | | 0–0 | 3–2 | 2–2 | 1–1 | 1–2 | 0–1 | 4–1 | 0–0 | 1–1 | 0–0 | 4–1 | 4–3 |
| Exeter City | 0–0 | 4–0 | 3–0 | 2–0 | 0–0 | 4–0 | 2–0 | 0–3 | 1–0 | 1–2 | | 2–0 | 4–2 | 1–1 | 0–2 | 3–4 | 1–1 | 4–1 | 2–0 | 2–2 | 4–0 | 3–1 |
| Gillingham | 1–2 | 5–1 | 3–0 | 2–1 | 3–2 | 6–2 | 1–1 | 1–1 | 3–7 | 0–5 | 1–1 | | 1–1 | 1–0 | 5–1 | 1–2 | 1–4 | 5–1 | 0–0 | 3–3 | 3–3 | 3–3 |
| Luton Town | 1–1 | 2–0 | 1–2 | 3–0 | 2–2 | 3–1 | 2–1 | 2–0 | 0–1 | 2–1 | 3–2 | 4–2 | | 1–1 | 3–1 | 2–3 | 4–2 | 3–1 | 3–1 | 2–3 | 10–2 | 2–1 |
| Newport County | 1–2 | 1–1 | 2–2 | 2–2 | 1–0 | 2–2 | 1–1 | 1–1 | 0–0 | 1–0 | 1–0 | 3–1 | 1–2 | | 2–0 | 0–0 | 1–2 | 1–2 | 3–0 | 1–2 | 0–0 | 0–3 |
| Northampton Town | 0–0 | 4–1 | 1–1 | 2–3 | 1–2 | 2–0 | 1–2 | 3–0 | 2–2 | 4–2 | 5–3 | 1–0 | 2–3 | 5–3 | | 2–2 | 2–1 | 2–4 | 2–0 | 2–2 | 1–1 | 1–0 |
| Norwich City | 2–2 | 6–1 | 4–3 | 7–2 | 0–0 | 2–0 | 3–0 | 3–0 | 3–1 | 2–0 | 1–1 | 4–1 | 4–0 | 2–1 | 2–0 | | 1–0 | 3–2 | 0–0 | 3–2 | 0–2 | 3–1 |
| Queens Park Rangers | 2–4 | 1–0 | 2–0 | 1–0 | 1–0 | 4–0 | 2–1 | 2–0 | 0–1 | 2–1 | 2–0 | 5–0 | 2–1 | 2–1 | 2–1 | 5–2 | | 0–0 | 4–0 | 1–0 | 2–0 | 0–0 |
| Reading | 3–2 | 4–0 | 2–0 | 1–1 | 2–2 | 3–1 | 1–0 | 4–0 | 1–0 | 0–0 | 3–1 | 2–0 | 4–1 | 4–0 | 2–2 | 1–0 | 5–0 | | 5–0 | 2–0 | 5–2 | 6–1 |
| Southend | 1–0 | 1–2 | 0–0 | 3–0 | 2–2 | 1–1 | 1–0 | 2–1 | 2–1 | 0–4 | 3–1 | 1–2 | 0–1 | 3–5 | 2–0 | 0–0 | 0–2 | 2–2 | | 4–1 | 3–1 | 1–1 |
| Swindon Town | 1–0 | 3–2 | 1–1 | 4–2 | 1–0 | 6–3 | 1–3 | 3–0 | 0–1 | 3–2 | 1–1 | 3–1 | 3–1 | 1–1 | 1–1 | 0–0 | 3–1 | 3–1 | 1–4 | | 2–0 | 1–0 |
| Torquay United | 0–0 | 1–0 | 3–0 | 2–2 | 2–1 | 3–1 | 1–4 | 2–1 | 1–3 | 2–1 | 0–2 | 2–1 | 0–1 | 1–2 | 3–2 | 1–2 | 1–1 | 1–1 | 3–0 | 2–0 | | 1–3 |
| Watford | 3–0 | 1–2 | 2–0 | 1–1 | 0–0 | 1–2 | 0–1 | 6–0 | 3–3 | 3–1 | 2–0 | 2–1 | 0–1 | 3–0 | 2–0 | 1–3 | 0–0 | 2–0 | 2–1 | 4–0 | 5–0 | |

Updated to match(es) played on unknown. Source: Ian Laschke: Rothmans Book of Football League Records 1888–89 to 1978–79. Macdonald and Jane’s, London & Sydney, 1980.
Legend: Blue = home team win; Yellow = draw; Red = away team win.

=== Maps ===
Locations of the Football League Third Division South London teams
Locations of the Football League Third Division South team

== Attendances ==
=== First Division ===
| # | Football club | Home games | Average attendance |
|---|---|---|---|
| 1 | Arsenal FC | 21 | 40,750 |
| 2 | Tottenham Hotspur | 21 | 33,730 |
| 3 | Aston Villa | 21 | 30,557 |
| 4 | Manchester City | 21 | 30,058 |
| 5 | Chelsea FC | 21 | 29,813 |
| 6 | Liverpool FC | 21 | 29,429 |
| 7 | Everton FC | 21 | 27,165 |
| 8 | Wolverhampton Wanderers | 21 | 24,681 |
| 9 | Newcastle United | 21 | 24,142 |
| 10 | Stoke City | 21 | 23,087 |
| 11 | Birmingham City | 21 | 22,197 |
| 12 | West Bromwich Albion | 21 | 20,102 |
| 13 | Derby County | 21 | 18,666 |
| 14 | Leicester City | 21 | 18,349 |
| 15 | Sunderland AFC | 21 | 18,269 |
| 16 | Portsmouth FC | 21 | 18,243 |
| 17 | Sheffield Wednesday | 21 | 16,020 |
| 18 | Sheffield United | 21 | 15,901 |
| 19 | Leeds United | 21 | 15,429 |
| 20 | Huddersfield Town | 21 | 14,515 |
| 21 | Blackburn Rovers | 21 | 14,005 |
| 22 | Middlesbrough FC | 21 | 12,634 |

== See also ==
- 1933–34 in English football
- 1933 in association football
- 1934 in association football
