= Haddington (disambiguation) =

Haddington is a town in East Lothian, Scotland.

Haddington may also refer to:

== Places ==
- Haddington, Lincolnshire, England
- Haddington, Philadelphia, United States
- Haddington Range
- Haddington Island, British Columbia

== People ==
- Ellie Haddington (born 1955), Scottish actress
- Harry Haddington (1931–2010), English footballer
- Ray Haddington (1923–1994), English footballer

== Other ==
- Haddington (Parliament of Scotland constituency)
- Haddington Burghs
- Earl of Haddington

== See also ==
- East Lothian, formerly referred to as Haddingtonshire, or the County of Haddington
