= 1985–86 FA Cup qualifying rounds =

Tournament details
- Country: England; Wales

The FA Cup 1985–86 is the 105th season of the world's oldest football knockout competition; The Football Association Challenge Cup, or FA Cup for short. The large number of clubs entering the tournament from lower down the English football league system meant that the competition started with a number of preliminary and qualifying rounds. The 28 victorious teams from the fourth round qualifying progressed to the first round proper.

== Preliminary round ==
=== Ties ===
Tie	Home team	Score	Away team
1	AFC Totton	2–0	Sholing Sports
2	Accrington Stanley	2–0	Darwen
3	Arnold	4–0	Shifnal Town
4	Ashford Town (Kent)	5–1	Faversham Town
5	Ashington	0–2	Durham City
6	Barton Rovers	2–1	Chesham United
7	Blakenall	0–4	Tamworth
8	Boston Town	0–2	Atherstone United
9	Bridgend Town	0–1	Poole Town
10	Bridlington Trinity	4–0	Netherfield
11	Bristol Manor Farm	2–0	Chard Town
12	Brockenhurst	1–3	Warminster Town
13	Caernarfon Town	1–1	Congleton Town
14	Camberley Town	2–2	Bromley
15	Chadderton	2–2	Ashton United
16	Chalfont St Peter	2–1	Banbury United
17	Chatham Town	1–1	Southall
18	Chatteris Town	0–3	Newmarket Town
19	Clapton	3–2	Leytonstone Ilford (Awarded to Leytonstone Ilford)
20	Colwyn Bay	3–1	Leyland Motors
21	Crockenhill	0–1	Hounslow
22	Deal Town	1–4	Southwick
23	Desborough Town	2–3	Oldbury United
24	Devizes Town	2–2	Pagham
25	Dorchester Town	0–0	Clandown
26	Easington Colliery	2–3	Billingham Town
27	Eastbourne United	4–2	Dover Athletic
28	Edgware	1–1	Erith & Belvedere
29	Emley	1–1	Belper Town
30	Eppleton Colliery Welfare	5–1	Yorkshire Amateur
31	Evenwood Town	1–5	Crook Town
32	Farsley Celtic	2–0	Seaham Colliery Welfare Red Star
33	Ferryhill Athletic	2–2	West Auckland Town
34	Fleet Town	0–2	Sheppey United
35	Garforth Town	1–2	Northallerton Town
36	Glastonbury	0–5	Exmouth Town
37	Great Yarmouth Town	2–0	Burnham & Hillingdon
38	Gresley Rovers	8–0	Friar Lane Old Boys
39	Hailsham Town	4–4	Dorking
40	Hampton	2–0	Chertsey Town
41	Harwich & Parkeston	2–3	Hoddesdon Town
42	Hastings Town	1–0	Burgess Hill Town
43	Heanor Town	0–2	Boldmere St Michaels
44	Hertford Town	1–1	Harefield United
45	Histon	3–0	Soham Town Rangers
46	Holbeach United	1–1	Rushden Town
47	Horley Town	0–5	Walton & Hersham
48	Horndean	1–1	Calne Town
49	Horsham Y M C A	0–3	Whyteleafe
50	Ilkeston Town	5–0	Lincoln United
51	Kingsbury Town	1–1	Leyton Wingate
52	Lancaster City	1–0	Willington
53	Lancing	0–3	Hythe Town
54	Langley Park Welfare	2–6	Horden Colliery Welfare
55	Leek Town	0–0	Armitage
56	Llanelli	2–3	Minehead
57	Lowestoft Town	2–0	Bury Town
58	Lye Town	2–1	Sutton Coldfield Town
59	Maesteg Park	0–1	Forest Green Rovers
60	Nantwich Town	1–0	Glossop
61	Newbury Town	2–1	Melksham Town
62	Norton & Stockton Ancients	1–1	Shotton Comrades
63	Oldswinford	2–1	Highgate United
64	Ottery St Mary	1–0	Torrington
65	Paget Rangers	2–2	Rushall Olympic
66	Radcliffe Borough	2–2	North Ferriby United
67	Rainham Town	1–2	Littlehampton Town
68	Ringmer	2–1	Whitstable Town
69	Rossendale United	1–0	Guiseley
70	Rothwell Town	3–3	Hemel Hempstead
71	Royston Town	2–7	March Town United
72	Saltash United	1–0	Barnstaple Town
73	Shildon	3–1	Esh Winning
74	Shortwood United	1–1	Sharpness
75	Spalding United	1–2	Coventry Sporting (Awarded to Spalding United)
76	St Albans City	1–1	Wolverton Town
77	St Blazey	1–0	Shepton Mallet Town
78	Stevenage Borough	2–1	Leamington
79	Stowmarket	3–0	Flackwell Heath
80	Sudbury Town	2–0	Tiptree United
81	Thackley	0–1	Fleetwood Town
82	Thanet United	3–1	Chichester City
83	Three Bridges	2–3	Lewes
84	Tilbury	2–0	Maidenhead United
85	Tonbridge	3–0	Horsham
86	Uxbridge	3–0	Corinthian Casuals
87	Warrington Town	3–1	Eastwood Town
88	Wellingborough Town	4–0	Wigston Fields
89	Welton Rovers	1–3	Mangotsfield United
90	Wimborne Town	2–5	Weston Super Mare
91	Wootton Blue Cross	0–1	Woodford Town

=== Replays ===
Tie	Home team	Score	Away team
13	Congleton Town	1–0	Caernarfon Town
14	Bromley	4–0	Camberley Town
15	Ashton United	2–1	Chadderton
17	Southall	2–0	Chatham Town
24	Pagham	4–1	Devizes Town
25	Clandown	0–0	Dorchester Town
28	Erith & Belvedere	1–0	Edgware
29	Belper Town	0–1	Emley
33	West Auckland Town	1–2	Ferryhill Athletic
39	Dorking	3–0	Hailsham Town
44	Harefield United	3–0	Hertford Town
46	Rushden Town	3–3	Holbeach United
48	Calne Town	0–0	Horndean
51	Leyton Wingate	3–0	Kingsbury Town
55	Armitage	0–2	Leek Town
62	Shotton Comrades	2–2	Norton & Stockton Ancients
65	Rushall Olympic	3–0	Paget Rangers
66	North Ferriby United	1–2	Radcliffe Borough
70	Hemel Hempstead	1–0	Rothwell Town
74	Sharpness	1–1	Shortwood United
76	Wolverton Town	0–2	St Albans City

=== 2nd replays ===
Tie	Home team	Score	Away team
25	Dorchester Town	1–2	Clandown
46	Rushden Town	1–0	Holbeach United
48	Horndean	2–1	Calne Town
62	Shotton Comrades	5–2	Norton & Stockton Ancients
74	Sharpness	5–1	Shortwood United

== 1st qualifying round ==
=== Ties ===
Tie	Home team	Score	Away team
1	Abingdon Town	0–1	Tring Town
2	Accrington Stanley	4–1	Droylsden
3	Alfreton Town	6–0	Bourne Town
4	Andover	1–3	Hungerford Town
5	Arlesey Town	1–2	Aylesbury United
6	Arnold	6–1	Tividale
7	Arundel	1–3	Basingstoke Town
8	Ashton United	0–1	Stalybridge Celtic
9	Atherstone United	3–3	Bilston Town
10	Baldock Town	0–2	Harrow Borough
11	Barking	4–1	Cheshunt
12	Barry Town	2–2	Paulton Rovers
13	Barton Rovers	1–2	Walthamstow Avenue
14	Basildon United	1–3	Alvechurch
15	Bath City	4–1	Taunton Town
16	Berkhamsted Town	0–0	Bedworth United
17	Bideford	1–1	Merthyr Tydfil
18	Billingham Synthonia	0–4	Gateshead
19	Blue Star	2–1	Guisborough Town
20	Boldmere St Michaels	1–1	South Liverpool
21	Bootle	0–1	Chorley
22	Bracknell Town	1–1	Hayes
23	Brandon United	5–0	Barrow
24	Bridgnorth Town	0–1	Mile Oak Rovers
25	Bridlington Town	0–1	Scarborough
26	Bridlington Trinity	1–0	Alnwick Town
27	Brigg Town	0–1	Worksop Town
28	Bristol Manor Farm	1–1	Gosport Borough
29	Bromsgrove Rovers	1–1	Gainsborough Trinity
30	Burscough	1–1	Armthorpe Welfare
31	Chalfont St Peter	1–1	King's Lynn
32	Chelmsford City	2–0	Alma Swanley
33	Colwyn Bay	0–3	St Helens Town
34	Congleton Town	1–0	Curzon Ashton
35	Cray Wanderers	1–1	Canterbury City
36	Denaby United	0–0	Long Eaton United
37	Dorking	1–7	Welling United
38	Dulwich Hamlet	3–1	Eastbourne Town
39	Durham City	2–3	Chester-Le-Street
40	Eastwood Hanley	0–0	Hyde United
41	Egham Town	1–1	Hornchurch
42	Emley	1–0	Nantwich Town
43	Eppleton Colliery Welfare	2–4	Spennymoor United
44	Erith & Belvedere	1–1	Crawley Town
45	Exmouth Town	2–0	Ottery St Mary
46	Fareham Town	2–2	Salisbury
47	Farsley Celtic	1–2	Blyth Spartans
48	Felixstowe Town	4–0	Gorleston
49	Ferryhill Athletic	0–3	Bishop Auckland
50	Fleetwood Town	2–2	North Shields
51	Forest Green Rovers	0–1	Clandown
52	Gloucester City	0–0	Ton Pentre
53	Goole Town	3–2	Skegness Town
54	Grays Athletic w/o-scr Burnham		
55	Great Yarmouth Town	0–1	Heybridge Swifts
56	Halesowen Town	2–0	Racing Club Warwick
57	Hampton	3–1	Southall
58	Harefield United	0–0	Aveley
59	Harlow Town	2–1	Cambridge City
60	Harrogate Town	0–2	Morecambe
61	Hastings Town	2–1	Epsom & Ewell
62	Haywards Heath	3–5	Croydon
63	Hednesford Town	2–1	Milton Keynes Borough
64	Hemel Hempstead	1–3	Nuneaton Borough
65	Herne Bay	1–5	Carshalton Athletic
66	Hinckley Athletic	2–1	Willenhall Town
67	Histon	3–1	Finchley
68	Hitchin Town	1–1	Haverhill Rovers
69	Hoddesdon Town	1–3	Dunstable
70	Horden Colliery Welfare	2–3	Crook Town
71	Horndean	2–3	Tooting & Mitcham United
72	Hounslow	1–2	Leyton Wingate
73	Hythe Town	1–0	Ashford Town (Kent)
74	Ilkeston Town	2–2	Buxton
75	Irthlingborough Diamonds	3–2	Shepshed Charterhouse
76	Kingstonian	1–0	Whitehawk
77	Lancaster City	0–4	Gretna
78	Leatherhead	0–2	Redhill
79	Leek Town	2–0	Winsford United
80	Leicester United	0–1	Witton Albion
81	Letchworth Garden City	2–3	Corby Town
82	Lewes	0–1	Tonbridge
83	Leytonstone Ilford	0–2	Marlow
84	Littlehampton Town	1–2	Gravesend & Northfleet (played at Gravesend & Northfleet)
85	Lowestoft Town	1–2	Braintree Town
86	Lye Town	1–3	Stafford Rangers
87	Mangotsfield United	1–3	Frome Town
88	Merstham	0–4	Slough Town
89	Minehead	1–1	Cheltenham Town
90	Moor Green	5–0	Wednesfield Social
91	Newbury Town	3–3	A F C Totton
92	Newmarket Town	1–6	Stamford
93	Newport I O W	3–2	Metropolitan Police
94	Northallerton Town	1–2	Shotton Comrades
95	Oldbury United	1–1	Grantham
96	Oldswinford	2–2	Gresley Rovers
97	Oswestry Town	1–1	GKN Sankey
98	Oxford City	7–2	Malvern Town
99	Pagham	2–0	Petersfield United
100	Penrith	1–3	Peterlee Newtown
101	Poole Town	5–1	Weston Super Mare
102	Prescot Cables	1–2	Runcorn
103	Radcliffe Borough	0–0	Ossett Albion
104	Redditch United	1–1	R S Southampton
105	Rhyl	3–1	Wren Rovers
106	Ringmer	1–3	Woking
107	Rossendale United	1–2	Mossley
108	Ruislip Manor	1–0	Hendon
109	Rushall Olympic	0–2	Wellingborough Town
110	Rushden Town	2–3	March Town United
111	Ryhope Community Association	1–3	Whitley Bay
112	Saltash United	1–2	Sharpness
113	Sheppey United	1–1	Fisher Athletic
114	Shildon	1–2	Billingham Town
115	Sittingbourne	1–2	Banstead Athletic
116	Skelmersdale United	2–2	Horwich R M I
117	South Bank	4–0	Darlington Cleveland Bridge
118	Southport	4–2	Clitheroe
119	Southwick	1–1	Folkestone
120	Spalding United	2–2	Matlock Town
121	St Blazey	2–4	Clevedon Town
122	Staines Town	3–1	Molesey
123	Stevenage Borough	0–2	Kidderminster Harriers
124	Stowmarket	2–2	V S Rugby
125	Sudbury Town	0–0	Stourbridge
126	Sutton Town	2–2	Marine
127	Sutton United	5–0	Beckenham Town
128	Tamworth	2–1	Walsall Borough
129	Thanet United	2–2	Bromley
130	Tilbury	2–1	Tunbridge Wells
131	Tow Law Town	1–0	Consett
132	Trowbridge Town	1–3	Chippenham Town
133	Uxbridge	0–1	Buckingham Town
134	Walton & Hersham w/o-scr Hastings United		
135	Ware	1–0	Billericay Town
136	Warminster Town	1–1	Wokingham Town
137	Warrington Town	1–3	Formby
138	Wembley	2–0	Boreham Wood
139	Whyteleafe	2–1	Eastbourne United
140	Wingate (Durham)	4–2	Workington
141	Wisbech Town	2–0	Dudley Town
142	Witney Town	3–0	Saffron Walden Town
143	Woodford Town	1–0	St Albans City
144	Worthing	3–0	Waterlooville

=== Replays ===
Tie	Home team	Score	Away team
9	Bilston Town	0–2	Atherstone United
12	Paulton Rovers	0–2	Barry Town
16	Bedworth United	1–2	Berkhamsted Town
17	Merthyr Tydfil	1–1	Bideford
20	South Liverpool	5–0	Boldmere St Michaels
22	Hayes	2–1	Bracknell Town
28	Gosport Borough	2–2	Bristol Manor Farm
29	Gainsborough Trinity	1–2	Bromsgrove Rovers
30	Armthorpe Welfare	0–1	Burscough
31	King's Lynn	1–2	Chalfont St Peter
35	Canterbury City	5–0	Cray Wanderers
36	Long Eaton United	1–0	Denaby United
40	Hyde United	1–2	Eastwood Hanley
41	Hornchurch	0–1	Egham Town
44	Crawley Town	3–0	Erith & Belvedere
46	Salisbury	0–5	Fareham Town
50	North Shields	2–1	Fleetwood Town
52	Ton Pentre	3–3	Gloucester City
58	Aveley	2–0	Harefield United
68	Haverhill Rovers	0–0	Hitchin Town
74	Buxton	4–1	Ilkeston Town
89	Cheltenham Town	1–2	Minehead
91	A F C Totton	2–0	Newbury Town
95	Grantham	2–1	Oldbury United
96	Gresley Rovers	5–3	Oldswinford
97	GKN Sankey	1–0	Oswestry Town
103	Ossett Albion	0–3	Radcliffe Borough
104	R S Southampton	3–2	Redditch United
113	Fisher Athletic	2–2	Sheppey United
116	Horwich R M I	3–0	Skelmersdale United
119	Folkestone	1–1	Southwick
120	Matlock Town	0–0	Spalding United
124	V S Rugby	3–2	Stowmarket
125	Stourbridge	1–0	Sudbury Town
126	Marine	6–0	Sutton Town
129	Bromley	2–1	Thanet United
136	Wokingham Town	3–2	Warminster Town

=== 2nd replays ===
Tie	Home team	Score	Away team
17	Bideford	2–0	Merthyr Tydfil
28	Gosport Borough	4–3	Bristol Manor Farm
52	Ton Pentre	2–1	Gloucester City
68	Hitchin Town	3–0	Haverhill Rovers
113	Sheppey United	0–4	Fisher Athletic
119	Southwick	3–1	Folkestone
120	Matlock Town	3–2	Spalding United

== 2nd qualifying round ==
=== Ties ===
Tie	Home team	Score	Away team
1	A F C Totton	1–1	Basingstoke Town
2	Accrington Stanley	1–1	Runcorn
3	Alfreton Town	2–0	Matlock Town
4	Arnold	0–2	Witton Albion
5	Atherstone United	4–0	Bromsgrove Rovers
6	Banstead Athletic	0–1	Hastings Town
7	Barking	0–2	Chalfont St Peter
8	Barry Town	5–1	Minehead
9	Bath City	1–0	Clevedon Town
10	Billingham Town	0–5	Morecambe
11	Blue Star	1–3	Bishop Auckland
12	Braintree Town	2–1	Alvechurch
13	Bridlington Trinity	6–2	Brandon United
14	Bromley	3–2	Ruislip Manor
15	Burscough	0–3	Mossley
16	Chelmsford City	1–0	Buckingham Town
17	Clandown	1–2	R S Southampton
18	Congleton Town	2–2	Horwich R M I
19	Crook Town	0–1	Scarborough
20	Dulwich Hamlet	1–1	Southwick
21	Dunstable	3–2	Tring Town
22	Egham Town	0–6	Crawley Town
23	Emley	1–4	Chorley
24	Exmouth Town	2–1	Bideford
25	Fareham Town	1–0	Wokingham Town
26	GKN Sankey	1–1	Leek Town
27	Goole Town	3–1	Buxton
28	Grays Athletic	2–1	Aveley
29	Gresley Rovers	1–0	Worksop Town
30	Halesowen Town	3–2	Stafford Rangers
31	Hampton	0–1	Aylesbury United
32	Harlow Town	1–0	Heybridge Swifts
33	Hednesford Town	1–5	Kidderminster Harriers
34	Histon	0–1	Corby Town
35	Hitchin Town	0–0	V S Rugby
36	Hythe Town	1–5	Croydon
37	Kingstonian	3–1	Walton & Hersham
38	Leyton Wingate	2–2	Harrow Borough
39	Long Eaton United	2–3	South Liverpool
40	March Town United	1–2	Hinckley Athletic
41	Marlow	2–3	Ware
42	Mile Oak Rovers	1–3	Grantham
43	Moor Green	1–4	Nuneaton Borough
44	Oxford City	2–1	Gosport Borough
45	Pagham	3–5	Newport I O W
46	Peterlee Newtown	2–1	North Shields
47	Poole Town	3–2	Hungerford Town
48	Radcliffe Borough	0–4	Marine
49	Redhill	0–2	Fisher Athletic
50	Rhyl	5–0	Formby
51	Sharpness	2–3	Chippenham Town
52	Shotton Comrades	0–2	Wingate (Durham)
53	South Bank	2–0	Chester-Le-Street
54	Southport	2–0	Stalybridge Celtic
55	Spennymoor United	1–2	Gateshead
56	St Helens Town	2–0	Eastwood Hanley
57	Staines Town	0–3	Welling United
58	Stamford	3–0	Berkhamsted Town
59	Sutton United	0–1	Gravesend & Northfleet
60	Tamworth	2–1	Wisbech Town
61	Tilbury	0–0	Hayes
62	Ton Pentre	2–1	Frome Town
63	Tonbridge	0–2	Carshalton Athletic
64	Tow Law Town	0–1	Gretna
65	Wellingborough Town	1–1	Irthlingborough Diamonds
66	Wembley	1–3	Walthamstow Avenue
67	Whitley Bay	1–2	Blyth Spartans
68	Whyteleafe	1–2	Canterbury City
69	Witney Town	0–0	Stourbridge
70	Woking	1–5	Slough Town
71	Woodford Town	3–1	Felixstowe Town
72	Worthing	5–1	Tooting & Mitcham United

=== Replays ===
Tie	Home team	Score	Away team
1	Basingstoke Town	1–2	A F C Totton
2	Runcorn	9–1	Accrington Stanley
18	Horwich R M I	2–0	Congleton Town
20	Southwick	2–1	Dulwich Hamlet
26	Leek Town	5–4	GKN Sankey
35	V S Rugby	3–1	Hitchin Town
38	Harrow Borough	2–3	Leyton Wingate
61	Hayes	1–2	Tilbury
65	Irthlingborough Diamonds	4–2	Wellingborough Town
69	Stourbridge	1–0	Witney Town

== 3rd qualifying round ==
=== Ties ===
Tie	Home team	Score	Away team
1	Alfreton Town	0–1	Gresley Rovers
2	Barry Town	2–2	Chippenham Town
3	Bath City	2–0	Exmouth Town
4	Bishop Auckland	3–2	Bridlington Trinity
5	Blyth Spartans	1–1	Scarborough
6	Chalfont St Peter	1–1	Braintree Town
7	Chelmsford City	1–0	Ware
8	Crawley Town	2–3	Leyton Wingate
9	Fareham Town	0–0	A F C Totton
10	Fisher Athletic	2–1	Tilbury
11	Goole Town	0–5	Marine
12	Grantham	0–2	Atherstone United
13	Gravesend & Northfleet	2–3	Bromley
14	Grays Athletic	2–2	Aylesbury United
15	Gretna	0–2	Morecambe
16	Halesowen Town	2–2	Irthlingborough Diamonds
17	Harlow Town	3–0	Woodford Town
18	Hastings Town	3–0	Canterbury City
19	Kidderminster Harriers	4–3	Tamworth
20	Kingstonian	2–0	Carshalton Athletic
21	Leek Town	0–1	St Helens Town
22	Mossley	0–2	Runcorn
23	Nuneaton Borough	0–0	Hinckley Athletic
24	Oxford City	4–1	Poole Town
25	Peterlee Newtown	2–1	Wingate (Durham)
26	Rhyl	2–0	Horwich R M I
27	South Bank	2–2	Gateshead
28	South Liverpool	5–0	Witton Albion
29	Southport	1–3	Chorley
30	Southwick	0–1	Croydon
31	Stourbridge	4–0	Stamford
32	Ton Pentre	1–1	R S Southampton
33	V S Rugby	2–0	Corby Town
34	Walthamstow Avenue	0–0	Dunstable
35	Welling United	0–0	Slough Town
36	Worthing	4–0	Newport I O W

=== Replays ===
Tie	Home team	Score	Away team
2	Chippenham Town	0–1	Barry Town
5	Scarborough	3–1	Blyth Spartans
6	Braintree Town	2–0	Chalfont St Peter
9	A F C Totton	0–3	Fareham Town
14	Aylesbury United	1–0	Grays Athletic
16	Irthlingborough Diamonds	1–2	Halesowen Town
23	Hinckley Athletic	0–1	Nuneaton Borough
27	Gateshead	1–1	South Bank
32	R S Southampton	1–2	Ton Pentre
34	Dunstable	2–0	Walthamstow Avenue
35	Slough Town	2–1	Welling United

=== 2nd replay ===
Tie	Home team	Score	Away team
27	Gateshead	1–2	South Bank

== 4th qualifying round ==
The teams that given byes to this round are Dartford, Enfield, Northwich Victoria, Frickley Athletic, Kettering Town, Maidstone United, Barnet, Weymouth, Dagenham, Wycombe Wanderers, Worcester City, Yeovil Town, Bishop's Stortford, Macclesfield Town, Windsor & Eton, Burton Albion, Bangor City, Bognor Regis Town, Farnborough Town and Whitby Town.

=== Ties ===
Tie	Home team	Score	Away team
1	Aylesbury United	0–0	Harlow Town
2	Bangor City	1–1	South Liverpool
3	Barnet	0–7	Enfield
4	Bath City	4–1	Croydon
5	Bromley	0–2	Maidstone United
6	Chelmsford City	1–0	Kettering Town
7	Chorley	4–2	Marine
8	Dagenham	5–1	Atherstone United
9	Dartford	2–0	Worcester City
10	Dunstable	0–2	Nuneaton Borough
11	Farnborough Town	3–2	Hastings Town
12	Fisher Athletic	1–2	Fareham Town
13	Frickley Athletic	2–1	Northwich Victoria
14	Halesowen Town	2–1	Braintree Town
15	Kidderminster Harriers	3–4	Bishop's Stortford
16	Leyton Wingate	2–0	Gresley Rovers
17	Macclesfield Town	3–1	South Bank
18	Morecambe	1–1	St Helens Town
19	Rhyl	0–2	Runcorn
20	Scarborough	4–1	Bishop Auckland
21	Slough Town	2–2	Kingstonian
22	Stourbridge	1–1	V S Rugby
23	Ton Pentre	1–3	Weymouth
24	Whitby Town	2–2	Peterlee Newtown
25	Windsor & Eton	2–2	Oxford City
26	Worthing	1–2	Bognor Regis Town
27	Wycombe Wanderers	1–0	Burton Albion
28	Yeovil Town	4–1	Barry Town

=== Replays ===
Tie	Home team	Score	Away team
1	Harlow Town	1–2	Aylesbury United
2	South Liverpool	3–2	Bangor City
18	St Helens Town	0–1	Morecambe
21	Kingstonian	1–1	Slough Town
22	V S Rugby	3–1	Stourbridge
24	Peterlee Newtown	0–1	Whitby Town
25	Oxford City	0–1	Windsor & Eton

=== 2nd replays ===
Tie	Home team	Score	Away team
21	Slough Town	2–1	Kingstonian

== 1985–86 FA Cup ==
See 1985-86 FA Cup for details of the rounds from the first round proper onwards.
