= Bob Wilson (footballer, born 1934) =

Scottish footballer (1934–2025)

Personal information
- Full name: Robert Smail Whitelaw Wilson
- Date of birth: 29 June 1934
- Place of birth: Musselburgh, Scotland
- Date of death: 24 October 2025 (aged 91)
- Position: Wing-half

Youth career
- Musselburgh Athletic

Senior career*
Years	Team	Apps	(Gls)
1954–1957	Aberdeen	20	(1)
1957–1960	Norwich City	62	(0)
1960–1961	Gillingham	35	(0)
1961–1962	Accrington Stanley		
1962–1963	Chester City	15	(0)
1963–?	GKN Sankey		
- * Club domestic league appearances and goals

Robert Smail Whitelaw Wilson (29 June 1934 – 24 October 2025) was a Scottish professional footballer. Primarily a wing-half, he began his professional career with Aberdeen, before going on to play for a number of English clubs. He was captain of the original incarnation of Accrington Stanley when the club resigned from The Football League in 1962.

== Career ==
Born in Musselburgh, Wilson began his career with local Junior club Musselburgh Athletic before joining Aberdeen in November 1954. He gained a place in the club's first team during the 1955–56 season and played in the team which beat St Mirren to win the Scottish League Cup that season.

In May 1957 Wilson left Scotland and joined Norwich City of the Football League Third Division South. He was a regular in his first season but soon lost his starting place and in 1960 he took the decision to leave Carrow Road and join Gillingham of the Fourth Division. He made 35 Football League appearances for the club, but chose to move on at the end of the 1960–61 season. A number of Scottish clubs were interested in signing him, but he chose to remain in England and join Accrington Stanley, also of the Fourth Division. He became club captain, but in March 1962 Stanley resigned from the Football League due to financial problems, making Wilson the last man ever to captain the club in a professional match. Wilson joined another Fourth Division club, Chester, where he played 15 times. He then left the professional game and dropped into non-league football with Shropshire-based GKN Sankey.

== Death ==
Wilson died on 24 October 2025, at the age of 91.
