= Alec Croft =

English footballer

Personal information
- Date of birth: 17 June 1937 (age 89)
- Place of birth: Chester, England
- Position: Winger

Senior career*
Years	Team	Apps	(Gls)
1958–1961	Chester	53	(3)
1961–?	Sankey's		
- Bangor City
- * Club domestic league appearances and goals

Alec Croft (born 17 June 1937) is an English former professional footballer who played as a winger. He made 53 appearances in the Football League for his hometown club of Chester.

== Playing career ==
A product of Chester's youth system, Croft made his competitive first–team debut as a substitute against Wrexham in the replayed final of the Welsh Cup at the Racecourse Ground in May 1958, with Wrexham winning 2–1. Just days earlier, Croft had scored for Chester against an All Star XI in a joint testimonial for Norman Bullock and Harry Smith at Sealand Road.

The following season saw Croft score on his league debut in a 2–2 draw against Walsall on 11 September 1958, but he managed just three league appearances during the campaign. However, the 1959–60 season saw manager Stan Pearson give many youngsters their opportunity in the side, culminating in Chester fielding one of their youngest ever forward lines when they hosted Torquay United on Easter Saturday. At 22 Croft was the youngest of Chester's five attackers, as he was joined up front by 20-year-old John Pimlott and teenagers Ron Davies, Les Stopford and Jimmy Cooper for the 1–1 draw.

Croft added 36 league appearances in 1960–61 before dropping into non–league football with Sankey's and later playing for Bangor City.

== Bibliography ==
- Sumner, Chas (1997). On the Borderline: The Official History of Chester City F.C. 1885-1997. Yore Publications. ISBN 978-1-874427-52-0.
