= Phil Spruce =

English footballer

Personal information
- Full name: Philip Thomas Spruce
- Date of birth: 16 November 1929
- Place of birth: Chester, England
- Date of death: 2010 (aged 80–81)
- Place of death: Chesterfield, England
- Position: Defender

Senior career*
Years	Team	Apps	(Gls)
- Heath Rangers
1950–1956	Wrexham	23	(0)
- Rhyl
- Colwyn Bay
- * Club domestic league appearances and goals

Philip Thomas Spruce (16 November 1929 – August 2010) was an English professional footballer who played as a defender. He made appearances in the English Football League with Wrexham, and also played in the Welsh league for Rhyl.

== Personal life ==
Spruce had an older brother George, who also played for Wrexham in the early 50s, and also played in the English Football League for Barnsley and Chester City.
