= Jerry Ireland =

English footballer (1938–2020)

Personal information
- Full name: Jeremy Ireland
- Date of birth: 14 September 1938
- Place of birth: Chester, England
- Date of death: 16 July 2020 (aged 81)
- Position: Inside forward

Youth career
- Chester

Senior career*
Years	Team	Apps	(Gls)
1957–1962	Chester	40	(8)
1962–19??	Altrincham		
- * Club domestic league appearances and goals

Jeremy Ireland (14 September 1938 – 16 July 2020) was an English footballer. He played in the Football League for his local club Chester between 1957 and 1962. Ireland died on 16 July 2020, at the age of 82.

== Playing career ==
Ireland made his professional debut for Chester on 21 September 1957, shortly after his 19th birthday, in a 1–1 draw with Southport, with four goals being scored in 15 league matches before the end of the season. His season included a goal in a 9–2 win over York City.

By the closing stages of 1959–60, Ireland and Alec Croft were given runs in the side and they were joined by several other youngsters in the first team, as players including Jimmy Cooper, Gerry Citron, Colin Jones, Derek Owen and future star Ron Davies were given their chance.

Ireland remained with Chester for two more years before dropping into non–league football with Altrincham.

He later became a lecturer at Liverpool Polytechnic, which became Liverpool John Moores University, gaining an MSC from Heriot-Watt University in 1980, he lived and lectured In Singapore and later Hong Kong, before retiring from Liverpool John Moores University.

== Bibliography ==
- Sumner, Chas (1997). On the Borderline: The Official History of Chester City F.C. 1885-1997. Yore Publications. ISBN 978-1-874427-52-0.
