= Bert Gebbie =

Scottish footballer

Personal information
- Full name: Robert Brown Robertson Gebbie
- Date of birth: 18 November 1934 (age 91)
- Place of birth: Cambuslang, Scotland
- Position: Goalkeeper

Senior career*
Years	Team	Apps	(Gls)
1958–1958	Blantyre Victoria		
1958–1960	Queen of the South	46	(0)
1960–1964	Bradford Park Avenue	112	(0)
1964–19??	Morecambe		
- * Club domestic league appearances and goals

Robert Brown Robertson Gebbie (born 18 November 1934) is a Scottish former professional footballer who played as a goalkeeper in the Scottish League for Queen of the South and in the English Football League for Bradford Park Avenue. He also played for junior club Blantyre Victoria and in English non-league football for Morecambe.
