= Ray Brand =

English footballer (1934–2020)

Personal information
- Full name: Raymond Ernest Brand
- Date of birth: 2 October 1934
- Place of birth: Islington, London, England
- Date of death: February 2020 (aged 85)
- Place of death: Southend-on-Sea, Essex, England
- Position: Centre half

Senior career*
Years	Team	Apps	(Gls)
- Hatfield Town
1955–1961	Millwall	150	(8)
1961–1963	Southend United	22	(9)
1963–1964	Hastings United		
Total		172	(17)
- * Club domestic league appearances and goals

Raymond Ernest Brand (2 October 1934 – February 2020) was an English footballer who played as a centre half in the Football League for Millwall and Southend United. Brand died in Southend-on-Sea, Essex in February 2020, at the age of 85.
