= Ian Saltmarsh =

English cricketer (1901–1970)

Personal information
- Full name: Ian John Lindsay Saltmarsh
- Born: 28 July 1901; Chester, Cheshire, England
- Died: 1970 (aged 68–69); Redruth, Cornwall, England

Domestic team information
- Years: Team
- 1930/31: Dr J Rockwood's Europeans XI
- 1923–1924: Devon

Career statistics
Competition	First-class
Matches	1
Runs scored	2
Batting average	1.00
100s/50s	–/–
Top score	2
Balls bowled	54
Wickets	–
Bowling average	–
5 wickets in innings	–
10 wickets in match	–
Best bowling	–
Catches/stumpings	1/–
- Source: Cricinfo, 20 February 2011

Ian John Lindsay Saltmarsh (28 July 1901 – 1970) was an English cricketer. Saltmarsh's batting and bowling styles are unknown. He was born in Chester, Cheshire.

Educated at Clifton College where he represented the college cricket team, Saltmarsh later made his Minor Counties Championship debut for Devon against the Surrey Second XI. From 1923 to 1924, he represented the county in 6 Championship matches, the last of which came against Cornwall. At some point beyond this, Saltmarsh moved to British Ceylon, where in the 1930/31 season he played his only first-class match for Dr J Rockwood's Europeans XI v Maharaj Kumar of Vizianagram's XI. In the team's first-innings he scored a 2 runs before being dismissed by Ghulam Mohammad. In their second-innings he was dismissed for a duck by Herbert Sutcliffe.

He died in Redruth, Cornwall in 1970.
