= Robert Butt =

English footballer

Personal information
- Full name: Robert Butt
- Date of birth: 27 March 1946 (age 80)
- Place of birth: Chester, England
- Position: Winger

Youth career
- Wrexham

Senior career*
| Years | Team | Apps | (Gls) |
| 1964–1965 | Wrexham | 3 | (0) |
- Ellesmere Port
- * Club domestic league appearances and goals

Robert Butt (born 27 March 1946) is an English former professional footballer who played as a winger. He made appearances in the English Football League with Wrexham.
