= Harry Clark (footballer, born 1934) =

English footballer (1934–2017)

Personal information
- Full name: Henry Clark
- Date of birth: 11 September 1934
- Place of birth: Sunderland, England
- Date of death: January 2017 (aged 82)
- Place of death: Surrey, England
- Position: Inside forward

Youth career
- Sunderland St Benet's

Senior career*
Years	Team	Apps	(Gls)
1956–1958	Sunderland	6	(0)
1958–19??	Blyth Spartans		
- * Club domestic league appearances and goals

Henry Clark (11 September 1934 – January 2017) was an English professional footballer who played as an inside forward for Sunderland. Clark died in Surrey in December 2016, at the age of 82.
