= Ray Faulkner =

English footballer (1934–2004)

Personal information
- Full name: Raymond Arthur Faulkner
- Date of birth: 26 May 1934
- Place of birth: Horncastle, England
- Date of death: 8 April 2004 (aged 69)
- Position: Winger

Senior career*
Years	Team	Apps	(Gls)
1950	Horncastle Town		
1950–1956	Grimsby Town	5	(1)
1956–19??	Louth United		
- * Club domestic league appearances and goals

Raymond Arthur Faulkner (26 May 1934 – 8 April 2004) was an English professional footballer who played as a winger. Faulkner died on 8 April 2004, at the age of 69.
