= Ben Newton (footballer, born 1934) =

English footballer

Personal information
- Full name: Benjamin Newton
- Date of birth: 10 October 1934
- Place of birth: Grimsby, England
- Height: 5 ft 8 in (1.73 m)
- Position: Inside forward

Senior career*
Years	Team	Apps	(Gls)
1953–1955	Grimsby Town	3	(0)
- * Club domestic league appearances and goals

Benjamin Newton (born 10 October 1934) was an English professional footballer who played as an inside forward.
