= Brian Griffiths (footballer) =

Welsh footballer

Personal information
- Date of birth: 21 November 1933 (age 92)
- Place of birth: Penycae, Wrexham, Wales
- Height: 5 ft 8 in (1.73 m)
- Position: Forward

Youth career
- Ruabon Youth Club
- Ruabon Athletic

Senior career*
Years	Team	Apps	(Gls)
1950–1952	Blackpool	0	(0)
1952–1958	Wrexham	22	(11)
1958–1959	Chester	2	(1)
1959–1960	Caernarfon Town		
1960–1962	Holywell Town		
?–?	Ludlow Town		

International career
	Wales Schoolboys	5	(?)
- * Club domestic league appearances and goals

Brian Griffiths (born 21 November 1933) is a Welsh former professional footballer.

== Playing career ==
Griffiths helped Ruabon Grammar School win the Denbighshire Schools' Championship before going on to spend time with Ruabon Youth Club and Ruabon Athletic. He went on to join Blackpool on amateur terms but he rejected the opportunity to sign as a professional due to working for MANWEB. During this period he was capped four times by Wales Schoolboys, scoring a hat-trick against Republic of Ireland in a 4–3 win.

In the summer of 1952, Griffiths joined Wrexham as an amateur, signing a part-time contract in May 1953. He remained part-time throughout his career despite pressure from club officials to become a full-time player. He scored 11 times in just 22 league appearances for Wrexham, including a hat-trick against Darlington, before moving to local rivals Chester in 1958, where he was restricted to just two league outings. After leaving Chester he dropped outside The Football League, spending time with Caernarfon Town, Holywell Town and Ludlow Town.

Away from football, Griffiths worked for MANWEB until he retired in 1991, with his other duties including being a member of Rhuddlan Golf Club and a church warden and treasurer at Rhuddlan Parish Church.
