= Gerry Citron =

English footballer

Personal information
- Full name: Gerald Conrad Citron
- Date of birth: 8 April 1935
- Place of birth: Manchester, England
- Date of death: 8 July 2005 (aged 70)
- Place of death: Fleetwood, England
- Position: Winger

Senior career*
Years	Team	Apps	(Gls)
1959–1960	Chester	2	(0)
- * Club domestic league appearances and goals

Gerry Citron (8 April 1935 – 8 July 2005) was an English footballer, who played as a winger in the Football League for Chester.
