= Harry Webster (footballer, born 1930) =

English footballer

Personal information
- Full name: Harry Webster
- Date of birth: 22 August 1930
- Place of birth: Sheffield, England
- Date of death: 2 April 2008 (aged 77)
- Place of death: Bolton, England
- Position: Inside forward

Youth career
- Woodburn

Senior career*
Years	Team	Apps	(Gls)
1949–1957	Bolton Wanderers	98	(38)
1958–1960	Chester	34	(11)
- Chorley
Total		132	(49)
- * Club domestic league appearances and goals

Harry Webster was an English footballer, who played as an inside forward in the Football League for Bolton Wanderers and Chester.
