= Jack Saunders (English footballer) =

English footballer

Personal information
- Full name: John Francis Saunders
- Date of birth: 24 August 1924
- Place of birth: Middlesbrough, North Yorkshire, England
- Date of death: June 2013 (aged 88)
- Place of death: Tameside, Greater Manchester, England
- Position: Centre half

Youth career
- British Army

Senior career*
Years	Team	Apps	(Gls)
1946–1948	Darlington	67	(0)
1949–1954	Chelsea	52	(0)
1954–1956	Crystal Palace	60	(0)
1957–1959	Chester	67	(3)
1959–1960	Hyde United	21	(0)
1960–1963	Mossley		
Total		267	(3)
- * Club domestic league appearances and goals

John Francis Saunders (24 August 1924 – June 2013) was an English footballer who played as a centre half in the Football League for Darlington, Chelsea, Crystal Palace and Chester. He also played non-league football for Hyde United and Mossley where he finished his career, making 100 appearances between 1960 and 1963.
