= John Pimlott (footballer) =

English footballer

Personal information
- Full name: John Gordon Pimlott
- Date of birth: 21 January 1939
- Place of birth: Radcliffe, England
- Date of death: 1992 (aged 52–53)
- Place of death: Bangor, Wales
- Position: Inside forward

Senior career*
Years	Team	Apps	(Gls)
1959–1961	Chester	41	(11)
1962–1969	Radcliffe Borough		
- * Club domestic league appearances and goals

John Gordon Pimlott (21 January 1939 – January 1992) was an English footballer, who played as an inside forward in the Football League for Chester. He had spells at Hyde United and Horwich R.M.I upon leaving Chester, before joining hometown club Radcliffe Borough where he became player-manager and later chairman.
