= Eric Davis (footballer, born 1932) =

English footballer

Personal information
- Full name: Eric William Charles Davis
- Date of birth: 26 February 1932
- Place of birth: Stonehouse, Plymouth, England
- Date of death: July 2007 (aged 75)
- Position: Centre forward

Senior career*
Years	Team	Apps	(Gls)
- Rhyl
- Tavistock Town
1952–1957	Plymouth Argyle	63	(29)
1957–1959	Scunthorpe United	40	(20)
1959–1960	Chester	31	(11)
1960	Oldham Athletic	2	(1)
- Falmouth Town

Managerial career
- Falmouth Town (player-manager)
- * Club domestic league appearances and goals

Eric William Charles Davis (26 February 1932 – 24 July 2007) was an English footballer who played as a centre forward. He made 136 appearances in the Football League for Plymouth Argyle, Scunthorpe United, Chester and Oldham Athletic, scoring 61 goals.

== Career ==
Born in Stonehouse, Plymouth, he began his career playing Rhyl while on national service. During this time he also had a trial at Chester, who he would join later in his career. Davis played for Tavistock Town when he returned to Devon and joined Plymouth Argyle in 1952. Having scored on his debut in March 1953, he was a back-up player to Maurice Tadman for two seasons and then played more regularly over the next three. When the club signed Wilf Carter in 1957, Davis was transferred to Scunthorpe United, having scored 29 goals in 63 league games.

During his time with Scunthorpe, Davis helped the club win the Third Division North in 1958 and scored 20 goals in 40 league appearances. He moved to Chester in 1959 and scored 11 goals in 31 league games for them. He had a brief stint with Oldham Athletic in 1960, scoring once in two league games, before retiring. Davis died in July 2007 at the age of 75.

Davis later became player-manager of Falmouth Town, overseeing their FA Cup run in 1962–63 which saw them reach the first round for the first time.
