= Malcolm Handscombe =

English footballer (1934–2022)

Personal information
- Full name: Malcolm Stewart Handscombe
- Date of birth: 29 June 1934
- Place of birth: Normanton, England
- Date of death: 1 February 2022 (aged 87)
- Place of death: Kirklees, West Yorkshire, England
- Position: Centre half

Senior career*
Years	Team	Apps	(Gls)
1957–1958	Chester	4	(0)
- * Club domestic league appearances and goals

Malcolm Stewart Handscombe (29 June 1934 – 1 February 2022) was an English footballer, who played as a centre half in the Football League for Chester. He died in Kirklees, West Yorkshire on 1 February 2022, at the age of 87.
