= Jimmy Mason (footballer, born 1933) =

Scottish footballer

Personal information
- Full name: Jimmy Mason
- Date of birth: 17 April 1933 (age 93)
- Place of birth: Glasgow, Scotland
- Position: Wing half

Youth career
- Rutherglen Glencairn

Senior career*
Years	Team	Apps	(Gls)
1954–1955	Dundee	1	(0)
1955–1957	Accrington Stanley	14	(1)
1957–1959	Chester	64	(7)
- Chelmsford City
Total		79	(8)
- * Club domestic league appearances and goals

Jimmy Mason is a footballer who played as a wing half in the Football League for Accrington Stanley and Chester.
