= Harry Haddington =

English footballer

Personal information
- Date of birth: 7 August 1931
- Place of birth: Scarborough, North Yorkshire, England
- Date of death: 2010 (aged 78–79)
- Position: Right-back

Youth career
- Scarborough

Senior career*
| Years | Team | Apps | (Gls) |
| 1952–1953 | Bradford Park Avenue | 2 | (0) |
| 1953–1955 | West Bromwich Albion | 0 | (0) |
| 1955–1961 | Walsall | 226 | (0) |
- Worcester City
- * Club domestic league appearances and goals

Harry Haddington (7 August 1931 – 2010) was an English professional footballer who played for Scarborough, Bradford Park Avenue, West Bromwich Albion, Walsall and Worcester City.

== Honours ==
with Walsall

- Football League Fourth Division champion: 1959–60
