= Les Stopford =

English footballer

Personal information
- Full name: Leslie Stopford
- Date of birth: 9 May 1942 (age 84)
- Place of birth: Manchester, England
- Position: Inside forward

Senior career*
Years	Team	Apps	(Gls)
1959–1962	Chester	6	(1)
- * Club domestic league appearances and goals

Les Stopford (born 9 May 1942) is an English footballer, who played as an inside forward in the Football League for Chester.
