= Gordon Richards (footballer) =

Welsh footballer

Personal information
- Date of birth: 23 October 1933
- Place of birth: Rhosllannerchrugog, Wrexham, Wales
- Date of death: 17 November 1993 (aged 60)
- Place of death: Johnstown, Wrexham, Wales
- Position: Winger

Youth career
- 1950–1952: Wrexham

Senior career*
Years	Team	Apps	(Gls)
1952–1958	Wrexham	96	(24)
1958–1961	Chester	74	(16)
1961	GKN Sankey		
- * Club domestic league appearances and goals

Gordon Richards (23 October 1933 – 17 November 1993) was a Welsh footballer.

== Playing career ==
Richards joined Wrexham as an amateur in 1950 and turned professional two years later. He went on to play almost 100 league matches in the next six years with Wrexham, but by January 1958 he was allowed to move to local rivals Chester after losing his place in the side.

Often a tormenter of Chester's defence when playing against them, Richards helped repay his new employers by scoring on his debut in a 4–2 win against Southport. He played at Sealand Road until a knee injury forced him to leave professional football in 1961, going on to briefly play for GKN Sankey.

Away from football, Richards worked for United Gravel and then Bond Delivery until he took early retirement in 1989.
