= Bobby Hunt (footballer, born 1934) =

English footballer

Personal information
- Full name: Robert Hunt
- Date of birth: 4 September 1934 (age 92)
- Place of birth: Liverpool, England
- Position: Wing half

Senior career*
Years	Team	Apps	(Gls)
1958–1961	Chester	84	(2)
- * Club domestic league appearances and goals

Bobby Hunt (born 4 September 1934) is an English footballer, who played as a wing half in the Football League for Chester.
