= Gordon Davies (footballer, born 1932) =

English footballer (1932–2020)

Personal information
- Date of birth: 4 September 1932
- Place of birth: Manchester, England
- Date of death: 19 June 2020 (aged 87)
- Position: Inside forward

Youth career
- Ashton United

Senior career*
Years	Team	Apps	(Gls)
1951–1955	Manchester City	13	(5)
1957–1958	Chester	22	(5)
1958–1959	Southport	11	(1)
- Morecambe
Total		46	(11)
- * Club domestic league appearances and goals

Gordon Davies (4 September 1932 – 19 June 2020) was an English footballer, who played as an inside forward in the Football League for Manchester City, Chester and Southport. Davies lived in Crewe, Cheshire, and died on 19 June 2020, at the age of 87.
