= Aled Williams (footballer) =

Welsh footballer

Personal information
- Date of birth: 14 June 1933
- Place of birth: Holywell, Wales
- Date of death: 8 December 2005 (aged 72)
- Place of death: Rhyl, Denbighshire, Wales
- Position: Wing half

Youth career
- Rhyl
- 1952–1957: Burnley

Senior career*
Years	Team	Apps	(Gls)
1957–1958	Chester	33	(1)
- Stalybridge Celtic
Total		33	(1)
- * Club domestic league appearances and goals

Aled Williams was a footballer who played as a wing half in the Football League for Chester.
