= Earl Godding =

Welsh footballer

Personal information
- Full name: Earl George Godding
- Date of birth: 6 January 1934 (age 92)
- Place of birth: Caergwrle, Wales
- Position: Goalkeeper

Senior career*
Years	Team	Apps	(Gls)
- Caergwrle
1954–1959	Wrexham	21	(0)
1959–1960	Workington	10	(0)
- Dolgellau
- * Club domestic league appearances and goals

Earl George Godding (born 6 January 1934) is a Welsh former professional footballer who played as a goalkeeper. He made appearances in the English Football League with Wrexham and Workington.
