= George Spruce =

English footballer

Personal information
- Full name: David George Spruce
- Date of birth: 3 April 1923
- Place of birth: Chester, England
- Date of death: 14 October 1998 (aged 75)
- Place of death: Chester, England
- Position: Defender

Senior career*
Years	Team	Apps	(Gls)
1948–1952	Wrexham	135	(3)
1952–1958	Barnsley	149	(0)
1958–1961	Chester	63	(0)
1961–?	Runcorn		
- Prestatyn Town
- * Club domestic league appearances and goals

George Spruce (3 April 1923 – 14 October 1998) was an English professional footballer who played as a defender in The Football League for three clubs.

== Playing career ==
Spruce was born in Chester and was invited for trials with Bolton Wanderers in August 1939 while playing local football in Chester, but the outbreak of war ended his hopes of joining the club. He finally got his chance in professional football in October 1948 when he joined Wrexham from Chester-based side Heath Rangers and played regularly before moving to Football League Second Division side Barnsley in May 1952. His spell at Wrexham overlapped with his younger brother Phil's time at the club, for whom he played from 1950 to 1956.

Although Barnsley were relegated in George's first season at the club, he was a regular part of the side when they topped Division Three North in 1954–55. He remained at Oakwell for two years before joining hometown club Chester in July 1958. At 35 he was one of Chester's oldest debutants when he played for the club for the first time against York City three months later. Spruce scored an own goal in the final minute in a 2–2 draw but went on to make 63 appearances for the club over the next three years.

Chester was to be Spruce's last league club and he played for Runcorn and Prestatyn before hanging up his boots. He was employed by the gas board and then worked as a taxicab driver.

== Honours ==
Wrexham

- Welsh Cup runners-up: 1949–50.

Barnsley

- Football League Division Three North champions: 1954–55 (44 apps, 0 goals).
