= Bill Souter =

Scottish footballer

Personal information
- Date of birth: 3 May 1931
- Place of birth: Dundee, Scotland
- Date of death: 24 August 2012 (aged 81)
- Place of death: Chester, England
- Position: Full back

Senior career*
Years	Team	Apps	(Gls)
1957–1960	Chester	51	(1)
- * Club domestic league appearances and goals

Bill Souter (3 May 1931 – 24 August 2012) was a Scottish footballer, who played as a full back in the Football League for Chester.
