= Barry Jepson =

English footballer

Personal information
- Date of birth: 29 December 1929
- Place of birth: Alfreton, England
- Date of death: 8 December 2001 (aged 71)
- Place of death: Swanwick, England
- Position: Centre forward

Youth career
- 1948–1950: Chesterfield
- 1950–1951: South Normanton
- 1951–1952: Bentinck C.W.
- 1952–1953: Ilkeston Town

Senior career*
| Years | Team | Apps | (Gls) |
| 1953–1956 | Mansfield Town | 55 | (36) |
| 1956–1959 | Chester | 89 | (42) |
| 1959–1960 | Southport | 24 | (7) |
- Alfreton Town
| Total | | 168 | (85) |
- * Club domestic league appearances and goals

Barry Jepson (29 December 1929 – 8 December 2001) was a footballer who played as a centre forward in the Football League for Mansfield Town, Chester and Southport.
