= Jim Cooper (footballer) =

English footballer

Personal information
- Full name: James Ernest Cooper
- Date of birth: 19 January 1942 (age 84)
- Place of birth: Chester, England
- Position: Winger

Senior career*
Years	Team	Apps	(Gls)
1959–1962	Chester	91	(17)
1962–1963	Southport	28	(7)
1963–1964	Blackpool	4	(0)
1964–1965	Mansfield Town	7	(4)
1965–1966	Crewe Alexandra	6	(0)
Total		136	(28)
- * Club domestic league appearances and goals

James Ernest Cooper (born 19 January 1942) is an English footballer who played as a winger in the Football League for Chester, Southport, Blackpool, Mansfield Town and Crewe Alexandra.
