= Royston Evans (footballer) =

Welsh footballer

Personal information
- Full name: John Royston Evans
- Date of birth: 9 February 1939 (age 87)
- Place of birth: Lampeter, Wales
- Position: Winger

Youth career
- Wrexham

Senior career*
Years	Team	Apps	(Gls)
1957–1960	Chester	23	(3)
1960–1961	Halifax Town	7	(0)
- Witton Albion
Total		30	(3)
- * Club domestic league appearances and goals

John Royston Evans (born 9 February 1939) is a Welsh footballer, who played as a winger in the Football League for Chester and Halifax Town.
