= Brian Biggins =

English footballer

Personal information
- Date of birth: 19 May 1940
- Place of birth: Ellesmere Port, England
- Date of death: 13 September 2006 (aged 66)
- Position: Goalkeeper

Youth career
- 1956–1958: Chester

Senior career*
Years	Team	Apps	(Gls)
1958–1961	Chester	5	(0)
1961–19??	Pwllheli		
- * Club domestic league appearances and goals

Brian Biggins (born 19 May 1940, Ellesmere Port; died 13 September 2006) was an English footballer who played as a goalkeeper. He made five appearances in The Football League for Chester.

Biggins became one of Chester's youngest goalkeepers when he made his first team debut aged 17 in April 1958 against Rochdale, having already played regular reserve team football. The following month he played in both games in the final of the Welsh Cup and performed well even though Chester lost a replay to rivals Wrexham.

Despite playing just a handful of league matches for Chester, he has the distinction of appearing in the club's final match in Football League Division Three North and first in the newly created Football League Division Four when the league system was restructured in 1958. He remained with the club until leaving for non–league side Pwllheli in 1961.

== Honours ==
- Welsh Cup runners up: 1958
