= Colin Jones (footballer, born 1940) =

English footballer

Personal information
- Full name: George Colin Jones
- Date of birth: 8 September 1940
- Place of birth: Chester, England
- Date of death: 25 October 2016 (aged 76)
- Position: Wing half

Youth career
- Chester

Senior career*
Years	Team	Apps	(Gls)
1959–1960	Chester	3	(0)
1960–?	Wrexham	0	(0)
- * Club domestic league appearances and goals

George Colin Jones (8 September 1940 – 25 October 2016) was an English footballer. He played in The Football League for Chester.

A wing half, Jones was one of several youngsters to get his first-team chance with Chester in the closing stages of the 1959–60. But he only enjoyed three outings for the club before joining Wrexham, where he failed to make a league appearance.

== Bibliography ==
- Sumner, Chas (1997). On the Borderline: The Official History of Chester City F.C. 1885-1997. Yore Publications. ISBN 978-1-874427-52-0.
