= GKN Sankey F.C. =

- Nickname: the Blues
- Founded: 1910
- Dissolved: 1988
- Ground: Sankey Stadium
- 1987–88: West Midlands (Regional) League; Premier Division, 16th
colours

GKN Sankey F.C., previously known as Sankeys of Wellington F.C., was an English association football club based in Wellington, Shropshire, which was incorporated into the new town of Telford in the 1960s. The club competed for a number of years in the West Midlands (Regional) League but disbanded in 1988.

== History ==
The club was the works team of engineering company GKN Sankey and played in the Shropshire County League from at least 1954 until 1960. In 1960 the club switched to the more senior Cheshire County League and played there until 1965, achieving a second-place finish in the 1963–64 season. They won the Shropshire Senior Cup in the 1961–62 season. This was followed by one season back in the Shropshire County League before the team joined the West Midlands (Regional) League in 1966.

The club played in the West Midlands League until 1974, gaining promotion to the Premier Division in 1971. After dropping out of the league for two years, Sankey's returned in 1976, initially in Division 1(B). In 1981 the team was relegated to Division Two, but won the championship at the first attempt to gain promotion back to Division One. In 1983 the league was re-organised and Sankey's was one of a number of lower division clubs elected into the Premier Division on the strength of its facilities. The team spent five seasons in the Premier Division before the club was disbanded in 1988.

== Colours ==
The club's final colours were all blue, hence the club's nickname of the Blues.

== Ground ==
The team played at a ground within the parent company's complex in Telford. As of 2005 it was reported to still be in place but in a derelict condition, and was targeted for residential redevelopment. A covered terrace from the ground later became a stand at the home of Pelsall Villa.

== Club records ==
- Winners Shropshire Senior Cup, 1961–62
- Best league position: 7th in West Midlands (Regional) League Premier Division, 1985–86
- Best FA Cup run: 2nd qualifying round, 1985–86 and 1986–87
- Best FA Vase run: Preliminary round on eight occasions
