= Norman Bullock (footballer, born 1932) =

English footballer

Personal information
- Date of birth: 26 March 1932
- Place of birth: Nuneaton, England
- Date of death: 2 October 2003 (aged 71)
- Place of death: Chester, England
- Position: Winger

Youth career
- Nuneaton Borough
- 1949–1952: Aston Villa

Senior career*
Years	Team	Apps	(Gls)
1952–1959	Chester	187	(41)
1959–1960	Rhyl		
1960–1961	Bangor City		
1962–?	Prestatyn		
- * Club domestic league appearances and goals

Norman Bullock (1932 – 2003) was an English footballer, who played as a winger in the Football League for Chester.
