= 1962–63 Chester F.C. season =

Chester
1962–63 season
- Manager: Bill Lambton
- Stadium: Sealand Road
- Football League Fourth Division: 21st
- FA Cup: First round
- Football League Cup: Third round
- Welsh Cup: Fifth round
- Top goalscorer: League: Peter Fitzgerald (8); All: Ron Davies (10)
- Highest home attendance: 9,614 vs Crewe Alexandra (19 September)
- Lowest home attendance: 2,935 vs Doncaster Rovers (11 May)
- Average home league attendance: 5,542; 11th in division

The 1962–63 season was the 25th season of competitive association football in the Football League played by Chester, an English club based in Chester, Cheshire.

Also, it was the fifth season spent in the Fourth Division after its creation. Alongside competing in the Football League the club also participated in the FA Cup, Football League Cup and the Welsh Cup.

== Football League ==
Pos	Team	Pld	W	D	L	GF	GA	GAv	Pts	Promotion or relegation
19	Stockport County	46	15	11	20	56	70	0.800	41	
20	Newport County	46	14	11	21	76	90	0.844	39	
21	Chester	46	15	9	22	51	66	0.773	39	Re-elected
22	Lincoln City	46	13	9	24	68	89	0.764	35	Re-elected
23	Bradford City	46	11	10	25	64	93	0.688	32	Re-elected

Source: rsssf.com

=== Results summary ===
Overall								Home						Away					
Pld	W	D	L	GF	GA	GAv	Pts	W	D	L	GF	GA	Pts	W	D	L	GF	GA	Pts
46	15	9	22	51	66	0.773	39	11	5	7	31	23	27	4	4	15	20	43	12

Source: rsssf.com

=== Results by matchday ===
Round	1	2	3	4	5	6	7	8	9	10	11	12	13	14	15	16	17	18	19	20	21	22	23	24	25	26	27	28	29	30	31	32	33	34	35	36	37	38	39	40	41	42	43	44	45	46
Result	L	L	L	L	W	L	D	L	L	W	D	W	D	L	D	L	W	W	D	W	L	W	W	L	L	W	W	W	L	L	D	L	L	W	L	W	D	W	L	W	L	D	D	L	L	L
Position	18	19	23	23	21	22	22	23	23	22	22	21	20	21	21	23	22	20	20	17	20	16	16	19	19	20	16	12	15	15	16	17	20	18	20	19	17	14	18	16	19	18	19	19	20	20

Source: statto.com
W = Win; D = Draw; L = Loss

=== Matches ===
Date	Opponents	Venue	Result	Score	Scorers	Attendance
18 August	Gillingham	A	L	1–2	Gregson	6,911
20 August	Darlington	A	L	1–2	Gregson	5,870
25 August	Stockport County	H	L	0–1		6,718
29 August	Darlington	H	L	1–2	Myerscough	6,249
1 September	Doncaster Rovers	A	W	2–1	Myerscough, Fitzgerald	6,506
8 September	Mansfield Town	H	L	0–2		7,775
12 September	York City	H	D	0–0		5,277
15 September	Workington	A	L	0–3		4,130
19 September	Crewe Alexandra	H	L	1–2	Fitzgerald	9,614
22 September	Exeter City	H	W	3–1	Davies (2), Fitzgerald	5,227
29 September	Chesterfield	A	D	1–1	Fitzgerald	7,652
3 October	Southport	H	W	6–1	Jones, Davies (4), Clarke	7,938
6 October	Aldershot	A	D	2–2	Clarke, Corbishley	5,086
8 October	Southport	A	L	1–4	Gregson	4,415
13 October	Newport County	H	D	2–2	Read, Davies	8,034
20 October	Oxford United	A	L	0–3		7,615
27 October	Bradford City	H	W	2–0	Pritchard, Fitzgerald	5,326
10 November	Torquay United	H	W	3–1	Fitzgerald, Hewitt, Allen (o.g.)	4,575
12 November	York City	A	D	0–0		3,645
17 November	Lincoln City	A	W	3–1	Corbishley, Myerscough (2)	5,125
1 December	Barrow	A	L	3–4	Clarke, Gregson, Jones	3,291
7 December	Hartlepools United	H	W	1–0	Hewitt	4,441
15 December	Gillingham	H	W	1–0	Gregson	3,663
26 December	Brentford	A	L	1–2	Myerscough	9,724
23 February	Aldershot	H	L	0–2		4,244
4 March	Newport County	A	W	1–0	Jones	3,700
9 March	Oxford United	H	W	2–1	Hewitt, Jones	3,772
13 March	Oldham Athletic	H	W	1–0	Jones	6,420
16 March	Bradford City	A	L	0–2		3,539
18 March	Stockport County	A	L	0–1		3,154
23 March	Tranmere Rovers	H	D	0–0		7,921
30 March	Oldham Athletic	A	L	0–2		8,434
3 April	Brentford	H	L	1–2	McGowan	5,919
6 April	Lincoln City	H	W	3–2	Myerscough (2, 1 pen.), Read	4,125
13 April	Torquay United	A	L	0–1		4,911
15 April	Rochdale	H	W	1–0	Fitzgerald (pen.)	4,979
16 April	Rochdale	A	D	0–0		2,926
19 April	Barrow	H	W	1–0	McGowan	4,924
22 April	Crewe Alexandra	A	L	0–3		8,236
27 April	Hartlepools United	A	W	3–0	McGowan, Morris (2)	2,728
4 May	Exeter City	A	L	1–2	Corbishley	3,927
8 May	Workington	H	D	1–1	Starkey	3,473
11 May	Doncaster Rovers	H	D	1–1	Fitzgerald	2,935
13 May	Tranmere Rovers	A	L	0–3		5,537
18 May	Mansfield Town	A	L	0–4		7,415
22 May	Chesterfield	H	L	0–2		3,920

== FA Cup ==
Round	Date	Opponents	Venue	Result	Score	Scorers	Attendance
First round	3 November	Tranmere Rovers (4)	H	L	0–2		11,448

== League Cup ==
Round	Date	Opponents	Venue	Result	Score	Scorers	Attendance
First round	5 September	Stockport County (4)	H	W	2–0	Clarke, Fitzgerald	5,124
Second round	26 September	Mansfield Town (4)	H	D	2–2	Davies (2)	6,159
Second round replay	10 October	Mansfield Town (4)	A	W	1–0	Davies	8,298
Third round	15 October	Mansfield Town (1)	A	L	2–9	Myerscough (2)	7,428

== Welsh Cup ==
Round	Date	Opponents	Venue	Result	Score	Scorers	Attendance
Fifth round	18 February	Wrexham (3)	A	L	0–1		5,020

== Season statistics ==
Nat	Player	Total		League		FA Cup		League Cup		Welsh Cup	
Nat	Player	A	G	A	G	A	G	A	G	A	G
Goalkeepers
(England)	Reg Barton	2	–	2	–	–	–	–	–	–	–
(Scotland)	John Hardie	46	–	41	–	1	–	3	–	1	–
(England)	Arthur Johnson	4	–	3	–	–	–	1	–	–	–
Field players
(England)	Jim Appleby	1	–	1	–	–	–	–	–	–	–
(England)	John Butler	51	–	45	–	1	–	4	–	1	–
(England)	David Cartlidge	10	–	8	–	1	–	1	–	–	–
(England)	Bobby Clarke	23	4	19	3	–	–	3	1	1	–
(England)	Colin Corbishley	38	3	34	3	1	–	3	–	–	–
(Wales)	Ron Davies	11	10	9	7	–	–	2	3	–	–
(England)	John Evans	1	–	1	–	–	–	–	–	–	–
(Republic of Ireland)	Peter Fitzgerald	46	9	41	8	1	–	4	1	–	–
(England)	Bernard Fleming	52	–	46	–	1	–	4	–	1	–
(England)	John Gregson	38	5	32	5	1	–	4	–	1	–
(England)	Bobby Griffiths	2	–	2	–	–	–	–	–	–	–
(Wales)	Ron Hewitt	18	3	16	3	–	–	1	–	1	–
(Wales)	John Hughes	2	–	2	–	–	–	–	–	–	–
(Wales)	Merfyn Jones	32	5	28	5	–	–	3	–	1	–
(England)	Ray Jones	3	–	3	–	–	–	–	–	–	–
(Republic of Ireland)	Dennis Keating	2	–	1	–	1	–	–	–	–	–
(Scotland)	Jimmy McGill	26	–	25	–	–	–	–	–	1	–
(Scotland)	George McGowan	15	3	15	3	–	–	–	–	–	–
(England)	Geoff Molyneux	2	–	1	–	–	–	1	–	–	–
(England)	John Molyneux	49	–	43	–	1	–	4	–	1	–
(Wales)	Elfed Morris	9	2	9	2	–	–	–	–	–	–
(England)	Bill Myerscough	28	9	23	7	1	–	3	2	1	–
(England)	Alan Pritchard	1	1	1	1	–	–	–	–	–	–
(England)	David Read	28	2	26	2	1	–	–	–	1	–
(England)	Malcolm Starkey	13	1	13	1	–	–	–	–	–	–
	Bobby Wilson	18	–	15	–	–	–	3	–	–	–
(Wales)	Barry Wright	1	–	1	–	–	–	–	–	–	–
	Own goals	–	1	–	1	–	–	–	–	–	–
	Total	52	58	46	51	1	–	4	7	1	–
