= 1961–62 Chester F.C. season =

Chester
1961–62 season
- Manager: Stan Pearson; Bill Lambton
- Stadium: Sealand Road
- Football League Fourth Division: 23rd
- FA Cup: First round
- Football League Cup: First round
- Welsh Cup: Fourth round
- Top goalscorer: League: Ron Davies (13); All: Ron Davies (15)
- Highest home attendance: 14,462 vs Wrexham (30 September)
- Lowest home attendance: 2,602 vs Hartlepools United (20 January)
- Average home league attendance: 5,578; 11th in division

The 1961–62 season was the 24th season of competitive association football in the Football League played by Chester, an English club based in Chester, Cheshire.

Also, it was the fourth season spent in the Fourth Division after its creation. Alongside competing in the Football League the club also participated in the FA Cup, Football League Cup and the Welsh Cup.

== Football League ==
Pos	Team	Pld	W	D	L	GF	GA	GAv	Pts	Promotion or relegation
19	Chesterfield	44	14	9	21	70	87	0.805	37	
20	Gillingham	44	13	11	20	73	94	0.777	37	
21	Doncaster Rovers	44	11	7	26	60	85	0.706	29	Re-elected
22	Hartlepool United	44	8	11	25	52	101	0.515	27	Re-elected
23	Chester	44	7	12	25	54	96	0.563	26	Re-elected

Source: rsssf.com
Note: The number of games played by each team was 44 instead of the usual 46, because Accrington Stanley resigned from the league on March 11 after 33 games. Their results (P33 W5 D8 L20 F19 A60 GA 0.317 Pts 18) were expunged.

=== Results summary ===
Overall								Home						Away					
Pld	W	D	L	GF	GA	GAv	Pts	W	D	L	GF	GA	Pts	W	D	L	GF	GA	Pts
44	7	12	25	54	96	0.563	26	5	9	8	36	37	19	2	3	17	18	59	7

Source: rsssf.com

=== Results by matchday ===
Round	1	2	3	4	5	6	7	8	9	10	11	12	13	14	15	16	17	18	19	20	21	22	23	24	25	26	27	28	29	30	31	32	33	34	35	36	37	38	39	40	41	42	43	44
Result	W	L	L	D	D	W	W	L	L	L	D	L	L	D	D	L	D	L	L	D	D	L	L	L	L	D	L	L	D	D	L	L	W	D	L	L	L	L	L	W	W	W	L	L
Position	1	11	19	18	19	13	9	14	17	18	17	17	18	19	19	21	21	22	22	22	22	22	22	22	23	23	23	23	23	23	23	23	23	23	23	22	23	23	23	23	23	23	23	23

Source: statto.com
W = Win; D = Draw; L = Loss

=== Matches ===
Date	Opponents	Venue	Result	Score	Scorers	Attendance
19 August	Oldham Athletic	H	W	1–0	Edwards	9,248
23 August	Bradford City	H	L	1–2	Jones	8,692
26 August	Accrington Stanley	A	L	1–0	Jones	4,106
30 August	Bradford City	A	L	0–2		7,877
2 September	Darlington	H	D	2–2	White, Jones	6,423
6 September	Carlisle United	H	D	1–1	Thompson (o.g.)	6,974
9 September	Hartlepools United	A	W	3–1	Cooper (2), Morris	4,838
16 September	Southport	H	W	2–0	Hennin, Davies	6,357
19 September	Doncaster Rovers	A	L	0–2		6,779
23 September	Tranmere Rovers	A	L	1–4	Edwards	9,182
27 September	Doncaster Rovers	H	L	2–3	Davies, Jones	6,671
30 September	Wrexham	H	D	1–1	Davies	14,462
2 October	Colchester United	A	L	2–5	Pritchard, Morris	7,148
7 October	Workington	A	L	1–4	Davies	3,145
11 October	Colchester United	H	D	2–2	Clarke, Davies	7,186
14 October	York City	H	D	1–1	Bellett	6,399
21 October	Chesterfield	A	L	1–4	Powell (o.g.)	4,436
28 October	Gillingham	H	D	1–1	Pritchard	4,439
11 November	Mansfield Town	H	L	0–1		4,186
18 November	Barrow	A	L	2–3	White (2)	4,228
2 December	Crewe Alexandra	A	D	1–1	Hennin	5,092
9 December	Exeter City	H	D	1–1	Morris	3,192
16 December	Oldham Athletic	A	L	1–4	Hennin	9,144
23 December	Accrington Stanley	H	D	0–0		2,153
26 December	Aldershot	H	L	2–3	Davies (2)	2,775
6 January	Millwall	A	L	0–2		10,352
13 January	Darlington	A	L	0–2		3,741
20 January	Hartlepools United	H	D	4–4	Edwards (2), Clarke, Fitzgerald	2,602
27 January	Rochdale	H	L	2–3	Davies, Aspden (o.g.)	4,082
3 February	Southport	A	L	0–1		4,018
9 February	Tranmere Rovers	H	D	1–1	Jones	7,371
17 February	Wrexham	A	D	0–0		14,220
24 February	Workington	H	L	1–3	Jones	4,011
3 March	York City	A	L	1–5	Davies	4,600
10 March	Chesterfield	H	W	4–1	Fitzgerald, Clarke (o.g.), Hewitt, Davies	4,176
17 March	Gillingham	A	D	0–0		5,187
24 March	Millwall	H	L	2–4	Fitzgerald, Hewitt	4,970
30 March	Mansfield Town	A	L	0–3		5,168
4 April	Aldershot	A	L	2–6	Davies, Hewitt	3,833
7 April	Barrow	H	L	2–3	Davies, Cooper	2,927
14 April	Rochdale	A	L	2–3	Hennin, Myerscough	3,061
20 April	Stockport County	A	W	1–0	Fitzgerald	4,388
21 April	Crewe Alexandra	H	W	1–0	Myerscough	3,890
23 April	Stockport County	H	W	2–0	Myerscough, Davies	5,105
28 April	Exeter City	A	L	0–5		3,219
1 May	Carlisle United	A	L	0–2		12,660

== FA Cup ==
Round	Date	Opponents	Venue	Result	Score	Scorers	Attendance
First round	4 November	Ashington (NCL)	H	W	4–1	Davies (2), Morris, Jones	4,361
Second round	25 November	Morecambe (LC)	H	L	0–1		7,982

== League Cup ==
Round	Date	Opponents	Venue	Result	Score	Scorers	Attendance
First round	13 September	Reading (3)	A	L	2–4	Davies, Cooper	7,786

== Welsh Cup ==
Round	Date	Opponents	Venue	Result	Score	Scorers	Attendance
Fifth round	31 January	Holyhead Town (Welsh League (North))	H	L	1–2	Fitzgerald	1,967

== Season statistics ==
Nat	Player	Total		League		FA Cup		League Cup		Welsh Cup	
Nat	Player	A	G	A	G	A	G	A	G	A	G
Goalkeepers
(England)	Reg Barton	1	–	1	–	–	–	–	–	–	–
(Scotland)	John Hardie	47	–	43	–	2	–	1	–	1	–
Field players
(England)	Wally Bellett	13	1	12	1	–	–	–	–	1	–
(England)	David Cartlidge	13	–	12	–	1	–	–	–	–	–
(England)	Bobby Clarke	13	2	11	2	1	–	–	–	1	–
(England)	Jim Cooper	18	4	17	3	–	–	1	1	–	–
(Wales)	Ron Davies	42	15	38	13	2	2	1	–	1	–
(England)	Fred Donaldson	25	–	21	–	2	–	1	–	1	–
	Malcolm Edwards	31	4	29	4	–	–	1	–	1	–
(England)	John Evans	11	–	11	–	–	–	–	–	–	–
(Republic of Ireland)	Peter Fitzgerald	42	5	38	4	2	–	1	–	1	1
(England)	Ray Gill	20	–	18	–	2	–	–	–	–	–
(England)	Derek Hennin	43	4	40	4	2	–	1	–	–	–
(Wales)	Ron Hewitt	13	3	13	3	–	–	–	–	–	–
(Wales)	Ron Hughes	45	–	41	–	2	–	1	–	1	–
(England)	Jerry Ireland	5	–	5	–	–	–	–	–	–	–
(Wales)	Merfyn Jones	39	7	35	5	2	1	1	1	1	–
(England)	Joe Kennedy	37	–	35	–	–	–	1	–	1	–
	Fred Morris	33	4	29	3	2	1	1	–	1	–
(England)	Bill Myerscough	13	3	13	3	–	–	–	–	–	–
(England)	Alan Pritchard	5	2	5	2	–	–	–	–	–	–
(England)	Eric Raybould	3	–	2	–	1	–	–	–	–	–
(England)	Les Stopford	1	–	1	–	–	–	–	–	–	–
(Wales)	John Watson	1	–	1	–	–	–	–	–	–	–
(England)	Billy White	14	3	13	3	1	–	–	–	–	–
	Own goals	–	4	–	4	–	–	–	–	–	–
	Total	48	61	44	54	2	4	1	2	1	1
