= 1960–61 Chester F.C. season =

Chester
1960–61 season
- Manager: Stan Pearson
- Stadium: Sealand Road
- Football League Fourth Division: 24th
- FA Cup: First round
- Football League Cup: First round
- Welsh Cup: Quarterfinal
- Top goalscorer: League: Ron Davies (23); All: Ron Davies (24)
- Highest home attendance: 9,750 vs Wrexham (1 October)
- Lowest home attendance: 2,466 vs Doncaster Rovers (22 April)
- Average home league attendance: 4,892; 16th in division

The 1960–61 season was the 23rd season of competitive association football in the Football League played by Chester, an English club based in Chester, Cheshire.

Also, it was the third season spent in the Fourth Division after its creation. Alongside competing in the Football League the club also participated in the FA Cup, Football League Cup and the Welsh Cup.

== Football League ==
| Pos | Team | Pld | W | D | L | GF | GA | GAv | Pts | Promotion or relegation |
|---|---|---|---|---|---|---|---|---|---|---|
| 20 | Mansfield Town | 46 | 16 | 6 | 24 | 71 | 78 | 0.910 | 38 | |
| 21 | Exeter City | 46 | 14 | 10 | 22 | 66 | 94 | 0.702 | 38 | Re-elected |
| 22 | Barrow | 46 | 13 | 11 | 22 | 52 | 79 | 0.658 | 37 | Re-elected |
| 23 | Hartlepools United | 46 | 12 | 8 | 26 | 71 | 103 | 0.689 | 32 | Re-elected |
| 24 | Chester | 46 | 11 | 9 | 26 | 61 | 104 | 0.587 | 31 | Re-elected |

Source: rsssf.com

=== Results summary ===
| Overall | | | | | | | | Home | | | | | | Away | | | | | |
| Pld | W | D | L | GF | GA | GAv | Pts | W | D | L | GF | GA | Pts | W | D | L | GF | GA | Pts |
|---|---|---|---|---|---|---|---|---|---|---|---|---|---|---|---|---|---|---|---|
| 46 | 11 | 9 | 26 | 61 | 104 | 0.587 | 31 | 9 | 7 | 7 | 38 | 35 | 25 | 2 | 2 | 19 | 23 | 69 | 6 |

Source: rsssf.com

=== Results by matchday ===
| Round | 1 | 2 | 3 | 4 | 5 | 6 | 7 | 8 | 9 | 10 | 11 | 12 | 13 | 14 | 15 | 16 | 17 | 18 | 19 | 20 | 21 | 22 | 23 | 24 | 25 | 26 | 27 | 28 | 29 | 30 | 31 | 32 | 33 | 34 | 35 | 36 | 37 | 38 | 39 | 40 | 41 | 42 | 43 | 44 | 45 | 46 |
|---|---|---|---|---|---|---|---|---|---|---|---|---|---|---|---|---|---|---|---|---|---|---|---|---|---|---|---|---|---|---|---|---|---|---|---|---|---|---|---|---|---|---|---|---|---|---|
| Result | D | L | L | W | L | L | L | W | W | L | L | W | L | L | D | D | D | W | L | D | L | L | L | W | L | D | W | L | L | L | L | D | W | W | L | L | D | L | L | L | L | W | W | L | L | D |
| Position | 13 | 16 | 20 | 14 | 19 | 21 | 23 | 20 | 18 | 18 | 21 | 19 | 19 | 23 | 22 | 21 | 22 | 20 | 21 | 20 | 22 | 23 | 23 | 22 | 23 | 23 | 21 | 22 | 23 | 23 | 23 | 22 | 22 | 22 | 22 | 22 | 23 | 23 | 23 | 23 | 23 | 23 | 23 | 23 | 23 | 24 |

Source: statto.com
W = Win; D = Draw; L = Loss

=== Matches ===
| Date | Opponents | Venue | Result | Score | Scorers | Attendance |
|---|---|---|---|---|---|---|
| 20 August | Gillingham | H | D | 2–2 | Davies, Kelly | 7,097 |
| 22 August | Bradford Park Avenue | A | L | 0–1 | | 8,244 |
| 27 August | Barrow | A | L | 0–3 | | 4,884 |
| 31 August | Bradford Park Avenue | H | W | 3–1 | Kelly (2), Cooper | 5,246 |
| 3 September | Millwall | H | L | 1–4 | Croft | 5,922 |
| 7 September | Aldershot | A | L | 2–3 | Kelly (2) | 7,830 |
| 10 September | Accrington Stanley | A | L | 0–2 | | 3,597 |
| 14 September | Aldershot | H | W | 2–0 | Anderson, Davies | 3,808 |
| 17 September | York City | H | W | 2–1 | Anderson, Davies | 5,597 |
| 19 September | Northampton Town | A | L | 2–3 | Davies (2) | 9,320 |
| 24 September | Crewe Alexandra | A | L | 2–5 | Hughes (pen.), Davies | 7,367 |
| 1 October | Wrexham | H | W | 1–0 | Kelly | 9,750 |
| 5 October | Workington | A | L | 0–1 | | 2,684 |
| 8 October | Rochdale | A | L | 0–2 | | 3,826 |
| 15 October | Mansfield Town | H | D | 3–3 | Davies (2), Pritchard | 5,553 |
| 22 October | Stockport County | A | D | 1–1 | Barrett | 6,770 |
| 29 October | Exeter City | H | D | 4–4 | Cooper, Barrett, Davies (2) | 5,173 |
| 12 November | Southport | H | W | 1–0 | Hughes (pen.) | 4,332 |
| 19 November | Darlington | A | L | 1–5 | Cooper | 5,521 |
| 26 November | Workington | H | D | 2–2 | Cooper, Davies | 3,551 |
| 3 December | Doncaster Rovers | A | L | 1–2 | Davies | 2,584 |
| 10 December | Hartlepools United | H | L | 1–2 | Davies | 2,644 |
| 17 December | Gillingham | A | L | 0–3 | | 4,902 |
| 26 December | Oldham Athletic | H | W | 3–1 | Kelly, Clempson (2) | 6,035 |
| 27 December | Oldham Athletic | A | L | 1–4 | Kelly | 19,315 |
| 31 December | Barrow | H | D | 0–0 | | 3,557 |
| 7 January | Crystal Palace | H | W | 3–0 | Davies, Clempson, Cooper | 4,243 |
| 14 January | Millwall | A | L | 1–5 | Kelly | 7,947 |
| 21 January | Accrington Stanley | H | L | 2–3 | Davies, Cooper | 3,878 |
| 28 January | Crystal Palace | A | L | 1–5 | Davies | 14,150 |
| 4 February | York City | A | L | 0–2 | | 4,867 |
| 11 February | Crewe Alexandra | H | D | 0–0 | | 7,521 |
| 18 February | Wrexham | A | W | 2–1 | Davies (2) | 9,653 |
| 25 February | Rochdale | H | W | 3–1 | Clempson, Hughes (pen.), Cooper | 3,877 |
| 4 March | Mansfield Town | A | L | 1–3 | Davies | 4,563 |
| 8 March | Northampton Town | H | L | 0–2 | | 5,455 |
| 11 March | Stockport County | H | D | 0–0 | | 3,942 |
| 13 March | Peterborough United | A | L | 0–8 | | 13,180 |
| 18 March | Exeter City | A | L | 1–4 | Edwards | 3,642 |
| 25 March | Peterborough United | H | L | 1–2 | Davies | 5,473 |
| 31 March | Carlisle United | A | L | 1–3 | Croft | 4,381 |
| 1 April | Southport | A | W | 2–1 | Kelly, Pritchard | 3,295 |
| 3 April | Carlisle United | H | W | 3–2 | Pritchard, Kelly (2) | 3,908 |
| 8 April | Darlington | H | L | 0–3 | | 3,515 |
| 22 April | Doncaster Rovers | H | L | 1–2 | Davies | 2,466 |
| 29 April | Hartlepools United | A | D | 4–4 | Hughes, Davies (2), Cooper | 4,381 |

== FA Cup ==
| Round | Date | Opponents | Venue | Result | Score | Scorers | Attendance |
|---|---|---|---|---|---|---|---|
| First round | 5 November | Carlisle United (4) | H | L | 0–1 | | 5,899 |

== League Cup ==
| Round | Date | Opponents | Venue | Result | Score | Scorers | Attendance |
|---|---|---|---|---|---|---|---|
| First round | 12 October | Leyton Orient (2) | H | D | 2–2 | Davies, Cooper | 9,074 |
| First round replay | 17 October | Leyton Orient (2) | A | L | 0–1 | | 5,002 |

== Welsh Cup ==
| Round | Date | Opponents | Venue | Result | Score | Scorers | Attendance |
|---|---|---|---|---|---|---|---|
| Fifth round | 1 February | Porthmadog (Welsh League (North)) | H | W | 2–1 | Kelly, Clempson | 1,709 |
| Quarterfinal | 22 February | Bangor City (CCL) | A | L | 1–3 | Hughes (pen.) | 2,500 |

== Season statistics ==
| Nat | Player | Total | | League | | FA Cup | | League Cup | | Welsh Cup | |
| Nat | Player | A | G | A | G | A | G | A | G | A | G |
|---|---|---|---|---|---|---|---|---|---|---|---|
Goalkeepers
| (Scotland) | Willie Brown | 45 | – | 41 | – | – | – | 2 | – | 2 | – |
| (England) | Derek Owen | 6 | – | 5 | – | 1 | – | – | – | – | – |
Field players
| (Scotland) | Jimmy Anderson | 20 | 2 | 17 | 2 | – | – | 1 | – | 2 | – |
| (England) | Tom Barrett | 44 | 2 | 39 | 2 | 1 | – | 2 | – | 2 | – |
| (Wales) | Jack Capper | 30 | – | 26 | – | 1 | – | 2 | – | 1 | – |
| (England) | Frank Clempson | 29 | 5 | 25 | 4 | 1 | – | 1 | – | 2 | 1 |
| (England) | Jim Cooper | 43 | 9 | 40 | 8 | 1 | – | 2 | 1 | – | – |
| (England) | Alec Croft | 39 | 2 | 36 | 2 | – | – | 2 | – | 1 | – |
| (Wales) | Ron Davies | 44 | 24 | 39 | 23 | 1 | – | 2 | 1 | 2 | – |
| | Malcolm Edwards | 14 | 1 | 14 | 1 | – | – | – | – | – | – |
| (England) | Tony Field | 2 | – | 2 | – | – | – | – | – | – | – |
| (Wales) | Billy Foulkes | 28 | – | 25 | – | 1 | – | – | – | 2 | – |
| (England) | Ray Gill | 21 | – | 20 | – | 1 | – | – | – | – | – |
| (England) | Derek Hennin | 14 | – | 14 | – | – | – | – | – | – | – |
| (Wales) | Ron Hughes | 49 | 5 | 44 | 4 | 1 | – | 2 | – | 2 | 1 |
| (England) | Bobby Hunt | 11 | – | 7 | – | 1 | – | 2 | – | 1 | – |
| (England) | Jerry Ireland | 3 | – | 3 | – | – | – | – | – | – | – |
| (England) | Harvey Jones | 19 | – | 19 | – | – | – | – | – | – | – |
| | Walter Kelly | 26 | 13 | 24 | 12 | 1 | – | – | – | 1 | 1 |
| (Wales) | Eric Morris | 1 | – | 1 | – | – | – | – | – | – | – |
| (England) | John Pimlott | 10 | – | 10 | – | – | – | – | – | – | – |
| (England) | Alan Pritchard | 12 | 3 | 11 | 3 | – | – | 1 | – | – | – |
| (England) | Eric Raybould | 8 | – | 8 | – | – | – | – | – | – | – |
| (Wales) | Gordon Richards | 5 | – | 4 | – | – | – | – | – | 1 | – |
| | George Spruce | 9 | – | 7 | – | – | – | 1 | – | 1 | – |
| (England) | Les Stopford | 1 | – | 1 | – | – | – | – | – | – | – |
| (England) | John Walton | 28 | – | 24 | – | – | – | 2 | – | 2 | – |
| | Total | 51 | 66 | 46 | 61 | 1 | – | 2 | 2 | 2 | 3 |
