= Cross-border derby =

Football rivalry between Chester City and Wrexham AFC

Cross-border Derby
- Location: Chester (England) and Wrexham (Wales)
- Teams: Chester City/Chester and Wrexham
- First meeting: 8 December 1888
- Latest meeting: Wrexham 2–0 Chester (11 March 2018)
- Next meeting: TBC

Statistics
- Most wins: Wrexham (65, Chester City vs Wrexham); Wrexham (4, Chester vs Wrexham)
- Most player appearances: John Rooney, Mark Carrington (7, Chester vs Wrexham)
- Largest victory: Wrexham 7–0 Chester City; Football League Third Division North (25 April 1953)

The cross-border derby is a football match played between Wrexham and Chester. The clubs are 12 miles apart but are Welsh and English respectively (though Chester's Deva Stadium straddles the England–Wales border, and its pitch lies entirely in Wales).

It was historically considered to be one of the biggest rivalries in the lower leagues of English football, due to the close proximity of Wrexham and Chester, as they are the largest settlements in the area (North East Wales/West Cheshire) and the only clubs in that area to have played in the Football League. The Welsh–English divide also makes it unique to other football derbies in Britain, as national identity is a large part of the two teams.

Wrexham edged the English–Welsh derby with 30 victories against Chester's 26 in Football League meetings. Between 1986 and 2005, the sides were in the same division for just one season (1994–95) but they were then Football League Two opponents in the three campaigns from 2005–06 to 2007–08. In 2009–10 the sides clashed again in the Conference National after Chester followed Wrexham out of the Football League (although they would only meet once with that game, a 0-0 draw at Wrexham, expunged due to Chester being expelled and going out of business midway through the 2009-10 campaign).

In the 2012–13 season, Chester won promotion to return to the Conference Premier three years after their previous club were expelled from the fifth tier, and played Wrexham at the Racecourse Ground, in a highly anticipated derby, as this was the first since Chester re-formed as a fan-owned club. All away fans had to travel to the match via coaches and a police escort and could not travel by train, unlike most years. Despite going into the game with a poor form in recent games, Chester won the match 2-0, recording their first win of the season.

The most recent meeting saw Wrexham win 2-0 in March 2018. The two teams are currently separated due to Chester's relegation from the National League at the end of the 2017–18 season, which sees them play in the National League North. As of 2025-26, Chester is four divisions below Wrexham, who gained promotion to the EFL Championship in 2024-25.

Games between the two are usually moved to Sunday, with a 12:00 kick-off, minimising time for alcohol consumption and the risk of the two sets of supporters clashing. The other cross-border derbies include Wrexham vs Shrewsbury Town and Wrexham vs Crewe Alexandra. Any match between any combination of these four clubs is considered one of the Marches Kite Derbies. This is because all four clubs have played against each other in the same league at some point, and the geographic locations of the towns form a kite or diamond shape on the map.

== Achievements ==
Comparative table positions of the derby participants in the English league system.

Competition	Chester	Wrexham
Football League	20 seasons in tier 3 (before 1958-year league reform); 15 seasons in tier 3 (after 1958-year league reform)	31 seasons in tier 3 (before 1958-year league reform); 4 seasons in tier 2 (after 1958-year league reform)
FA Cup	5th round 1976–77; 1979–80	Quarter-final; 1973–74; 1977–78; 1996–97
League Cup	Semi-final; 1974–75	Quarter-final; 1960–61; 1977–78

== Head-to-head summary ==
=== Chester City vs Wrexham (1888–2009) ===
Competition	Chester wins	Draw	Wrexham wins	Goal Difference
The Football League	26	20	30	110–114
The Combination	10	3	9	37–37
FA Cup	3	0	6	14–19
League Cup	1	1	3	5–10
Welsh Cup	6	5	15	20–41
Football League Trophy	1	0	2	4–4
Third Division North Cup	2	2	1	8–5
Matches in Chester	32	14	27	114–105
Matches in Wrexham	17	17	38	84–123
Neutral field matches	0	0	1	0–2
Overall	49	31	66	198–230

=== Chester FC vs Wrexham (2013–) ===
Competition	Chester wins	Draw	Wrexham wins	Goal Difference
Conference National	3	3	4	8–11
FA Cup	0	0	0	0–0
FA Trophy	0	0	0	0–0
Matches in Chester	2	2	1	6–5
Matches in Wrexham	1	1	3	2–6
Overall	3	3	4	8–11

== Head-to-head fixtures ==
=== Chester City vs Wrexham ===
Date	Home	Score	Away	Venue	Att.	Competition
8 Dec 1888	Chester	2–3	Wrexham	Faulkner Street	4,000	1888–89 FA Cup 4QR
13 Sep 1890	Wrexham	0–1	Chester	Racecourse Ground	500	1890–91 The Combination League
24 Jan 1891	Chester	2–4	Wrexham	Faulkner Street	1,000	1890–91 The Combination League
26 Sep 1891	Chester	2–3	Wrexham	Faulkner Street	1,000	1891–92 The Combination League
24 Oct 1891	Chester	2–4	Wrexham	Faulkner Street	3,000	1891–92 FA Cup 2QR
12 Dec 1891	Wrexham	1–3	Chester	Racecourse Ground	n/a	1891–92 The Combination League
24 Sep 1892	Wrexham	3–0	Chester	Racecourse Ground	1,000	1892–93 The Combination League
3 Dec 1892	Chester	5–1	Wrexham	Faulkner Street	n/a	1892–93 The Combination League
16 Sep 1893	Chester	1–2	Wrexham	Faulkner Street	2,500	1893–94 The Combination League
28 Oct 1893	Wrexham	0–1	Chester	Racecourse Ground	n/a	1893–94 The Combination League
7 Nov 1896	Chester	3–2	Wrexham	Faulkner Street	n/a	1896–97 The Combination League
12 Apr 1897	Wrexham	0–2	Chester	Racecourse Ground	n/a	1896–97 The Combination League
26 Dec 1897	Wrexham	1–3	Chester	Racecourse Ground	3,000	1897–98 The Combination League
8 Apr 1898	Chester	1–0	Wrexham	Faulkner Street	3,000	1897–98 The Combination League
24 Sep 1898	Chester	3–1	Wrexham	Old Showground	n/a	1898–99 The Combination League
1 Oct 1898	Wrexham	3–2	Chester	Racecourse Ground	n/a	1898–99 FA Cup 1QR
19 Nov 1898	Wrexham	1–0	Chester	Racecourse Ground	n/a	1898–99 The Combination League
28 Sep 1901	Chester	2–2	Wrexham	Whipcord Lane	2,000	1901–02 The Combination League
23 Apr 1902	Wrexham	3–0	Chester	Racecourse Ground	n/a	1901–02 The Combination League
6 Dec 1902	Wrexham	2–0	Chester	Racecourse Ground	2,000	1902–03 Welsh Cup R3
25 Dec 1902	Wrexham	3–1	Chester	Racecourse Ground	n/a	1902–03 The Combination League
10 Apr 1903	Chester	0–4	Wrexham	Whipcord Lane	n/a	1902–03 The Combination League
25 Dec 1903	Wrexham	1–3	Chester	Racecourse Ground	2,500	1903–04 The Combination League
1 Apr 1904	Chester	1–1	Wrexham	Whipcord Lane	n/a	1903–04 The Combination League
3 Dec 1904	Wrexham	3–2	Chester	Racecourse Ground	2,000	1904–05 The Combination League
7 Jan 1905	Chester	0–1	Wrexham	Whipcord Lane	n/a	1904–05 Welsh Cup R3
1 Apr 1905	Chester	1–1	Wrexham	Whipcord Lane	4,000	1904–05 The Combination
7 Nov 1908	Chester	1–3	Wrexham	Sealand Road	4,000	1908–09 FA Cup 3QR
12 Apr 1909	Wrexham	1–0	Chester	Racecourse Ground	9,000	1908–09 Welsh Cup Final
28 Mar 1910	Wrexham	2–1	Chester	Racecourse Ground	10,000	1909–10 Welsh Cup Final
1 Oct 1910	Wrexham	0–1	Chester	Racecourse Ground	5,300	1910–11 FA Cup 1QR
4 Nov 1911	Wrexham	1–4	Chester	Racecourse Ground	7,500	1911–12 FA Cup 3QR
28 Sep 1912	Wrexham	2–0	Chester	Racecourse Ground	5,000	1912–13 FA Cup 1QR
2 Sep 1931	Wrexham	1–1	Chester	Racecourse Ground	19,000	1931–32 Third Division North
30 Sep 1931	Chester	2–5	Wrexham	Sealand Road	13,658	1931–32 Third Division North
24 Sep 1932	Wrexham	1–2	Chester	Racecourse Ground	19,649	1932–33 Third Division North
4 Feb 1933	Chester	0–3	Wrexham	Sealand Road	16,835	1932–33 Third Division North
3 May 1933	Chester	2–0	Wrexham	Sealand Road	15,000	1932–33 Welsh Cup Final
16 Sep 1933	Wrexham	0–3	Chester	Racecourse Ground	18,782	1933–34 Third Division North
27 Jan 1934	Chester	1–2	Wrexham	Sealand Road	14,481	1933–34 Third Division North
28 Feb 1934	Wrexham	2–0	Chester	Racecourse Ground	10,497	1933–34 Third Division North Cup R2
29 Sep 1934	Chester	6–2	Wrexham	Sealand Road	15,106	1934–35 Third Division North
14 Nov 1934	Wrexham	1–1	Chester	Racecourse Ground	6,190	1934–35 Third Division North Cup R1
9 Feb 1935	Wrexham	2–2	Chester	Racecourse Ground	18,233	1934–35 Third Division North
27 Feb 1935	Chester	1–0	Wrexham	Sealand Road	2,900	1934–35 Third Division North Cup R1 replay
7 Sep 1935	Wrexham	1–0	Chester	Racecourse Ground	24,690	1935–36 Third Division North
4 Jan 1936	Chester	1–1	Wrexham	Sealand Road	10,511	1935–36 Third Division North
29 Jan 1936	Wrexham	2–2	Chester	Racecourse Ground	2,577	1935–36 Third Division North Cup R2
19 Feb 1936	Chester	4–0	Wrexham	Sealand Road	n/a	1935–36 Third Division North Cup R2 replay
29 Aug 1936	Chester	4–1	Wrexham	Sealand Road	16,004	1936–37 Third Division North
26 Dec 1936	Wrexham	1–2	Chester	Racecourse Ground	29,261	1936–37 Third Division North
15 Apr 1938	Chester	2–1	Wrexham	Sealand Road	10,892	1937–38 Third Division North
18 Apr 1938	Wrexham	3–1	Chester	Racecourse Ground	11,480	1937–38 Third Division North
22 Oct 1938	Wrexham	3–2	Chester	Racecourse Ground	15,785	1938–39 Third Division North
25 Feb 1939	Chester	4–2	Wrexham	Sealand Road	10,364	1938–39 Third Division North
18 Sep 1946	Chester	2–0	Wrexham	Sealand Road	11,866	1946–47 Third Division North
26 Apr 1947	Wrexham	0–4	Chester	Racecourse Ground	18,746	1946–47 Third Division North
11 Oct 1947	Wrexham	2–1	Chester	Racecourse Ground	21,131	1947–48 Third Division North
28 Feb 1948	Chester	4–1	Wrexham	Sealand Road	16,160	1947–48 Third Division North
4 Dec 1948	Chester	2–0	Wrexham	Sealand Road	11,909	1948–49 Third Division North
8 Jan 1949	Wrexham	1–0	Chester	Racecourse Ground	11,947	1948–49 Third Division North
12 Jan 1949	Chester	0–6	Wrexham	Sealand Road	3,790	1948–49 Welsh Cup R5
8 Oct 1949	Chester	2–1	Wrexham	Sealand Road	14,034	1949–50 Third Division North
29 Mar 1950	Wrexham	0–0	Chester	Racecourse Ground	7,041	1949–50 Welsh Cup Final
8 Apr 1950	Wrexham	1–1	Chester	Racecourse Ground	8,932	1949–50 Third Division North
17 Apr 1950	Chester	1–5	Wrexham	Sealand Road	n/a	1949–50 Welsh Cup Final replay
6 Sep 1950	Chester	0–0	Wrexham	Sealand Road	11,280	1950–51 Third Division North
13 Sep 1950	Wrexham	2–0	Chester	Racecourse Ground	16,710	1950–51 Third Division North
18 Aug 1951	Chester	2–0	Wrexham	Sealand Road	14,244	1951–52 Third Division North
26 Sep 1951	Wrexham	3–2	Chester	Racecourse Ground	12,213	1951–52 Third Division North
6 Feb 1952	Wrexham	0–0	Chester	Racecourse Ground	7,434	1951–52 Welsh Cup R6
20 Feb 1952	Chester	0–2	Wrexham	Sealand Road	4,178	1951–52 Welsh Cup R6 replay
31 Dec 1952	Wrexham	3–4	Chester	Racecourse Ground	5,044	1952–53 Welsh Cup R6
15 Apr 1953	Chester	1–2	Wrexham	Sealand Road	11,371	1952–53 Third Division North
25 Apr 1953	Wrexham	7–0	Chester	Racecourse Ground	11,082	1952–53 Third Division North
3 Oct 1953	Chester	2–1	Wrexham	Sealand Road	14,627	1953–54 Third Division North
20 Feb 1954	Wrexham	2–1	Chester	Racecourse Ground	10,225	1953–54 Third Division North
3 Mar 1954	Chester	1–0	Wrexham	Sealand Road	2,133	1953–54 Welsh Cup R6
25 Aug 1954	Chester	1–0	Wrexham	Sealand Road	12,044	1954–55 Third Division North
1 Sep 1954	Wrexham	2–1	Chester	Racecourse Ground	15,495	1954–55 Third Division North
1 Oct 1955	Chester	2–1	Wrexham	Sealand Road	15,202	1955–56 Third Division North
11 Feb 1956	Wrexham	0–0	Chester	Racecourse Ground	6,673	1955–56 Third Division North
18 Aug 1956	Wrexham	2–2	Chester	Racecourse Ground	13,508	1956–57 Third Division North
15 Dec 1956	Chester	0–0	Wrexham	Sealand Road	10,066	1956–57 Third Division North
20 Mar 1957	Wrexham	2–0	Chester	Rhyl	n/a	1956–57 Welsh Cup SF
11 Sep 1957	Wrexham	1–0	Chester	Racecourse Ground	11,754	1957–58 Third Division North
18 Sep 1957	Chester	0–1	Wrexham	Sealand Road	12,554	1957–58 Third Division North
7 May 1958	Chester	1–1	Wrexham	Sealand Road	7,742	1957–58 Welsh Cup Final
10 May 1958	Wrexham	2–1	Chester	Racecourse Ground	7,542	1957–58 Welsh Cup Final replay
1 Oct 1960	Chester	1–0	Wrexham	Sealand Road	9,750	1960–61 Fourth Division
18 Feb 1961	Wrexham	1–2	Chester	Racecourse Ground	9,653	1960–61 Fourth Division
30 Sep 1961	Chester	1–1	Wrexham	Sealand Road	14,462	1961–62 Fourth Division
17 Feb 1962	Wrexham	0–0	Chester	Racecourse Ground	14,220	1961–62 Fourth Division
18 Feb 1963	Wrexham	1–0	Chester	Racecourse Ground	5,020	1962–63 Welsh Cup R5
2 Sep 1964	Chester	3–0	Wrexham	Sealand Road	10,331	1964–65 League Cup R1
17 Oct 1964	Wrexham	4–2	Chester	Racecourse Ground	14,690	1964–65 Fourth Division
27 Feb 1965	Chester	6–1	Wrexham	Sealand Road	14,782	1964–65 Fourth Division
30 Mar 1965	Wrexham	3–0	Chester	Racecourse Ground	12,341	1964–65 Welsh Cup SF
1 Sep 1965	Wrexham	5–2	Chester	Racecourse Ground	9,996	1965–66 League Cup R1
18 Sep 1965	Chester	4–2	Wrexham	Sealand Road	13,004	1965–66 Fourth Division
5 Jan 1966	Chester	4–1	Wrexham	Sealand Road	7,213	1965–66 Welsh Cup Final
12 Mar 1966	Wrexham	2–1	Chester	Racecourse Ground	17,178	1965–66 Fourth Division
8 Oct 1966	Chester	1–3	Wrexham	Sealand Road	12,205	1966–67 Fourth Division
25 Feb 1967	Wrexham	3–1	Chester	Racecourse Ground	11,751	1966–67 Fourth Division
15 Mar 1967	Chester	0–0	Wrexham	Sealand Road	9,496	1966–67 Welsh Cup SF
20 Mar 1967	Wrexham	4–2	Chester	Racecourse Ground	11,329	1966–67 Welsh Cup SF replay
2 Sep 1967	Wrexham	2–0	Chester	Racecourse Ground	11,740	1967–68 Fourth Division
15 Nov 1967	Chester	1–1	Wrexham	Sealand Road	10,733	1967–68 Fourth Division
6 Nov 1968	Chester	1–1	Wrexham	Sealand Road	13,943	1968–69 Fourth Division
25 Jan 1969	Wrexham	1–1	Chester	Racecourse Ground	13,955	1968–69 Fourth Division
23 Aug 1969	Wrexham	2–0	Chester	Racecourse Ground	11,959	1969–70 Fourth Division
26 Dec 1969	Chester	2–0	Wrexham	Sealand Road	15,024	1969–70 Fourth Division
13 Jan 1973	Chester	1–0	Wrexham	Sealand Road	3,588	1972–73 Welsh Cup R4
29 Aug 1973	Chester	0–2	Wrexham	Sealand Road	4,791	1973–74 League Cup R1
8 Feb 1974	Wrexham	1–0	Chester	Racecourse Ground	6,904	1973–74 Welsh Cup R5
20 Aug 1975	Wrexham	3–0	Chester	Racecourse Ground	8,267	1975–76 League Cup R1 1st leg
27 Aug 1975	Chester	0–0	Wrexham	Sealand Road	6,346	1975–76 League Cup R1 2nd leg
26 Dec 1975	Wrexham	1–1	Chester	Racecourse Ground	10,486	1975–76 Third Division
16 Feb 1976	Wrexham	0–0	Chester	Racecourse Ground	3,787	1975–76 Welsh Cup R5
26 Feb 1976	Chester	2–1	Wrexham	Sealand Road	4,734	1975–76 Welsh Cup R5R
17 Apr 1976	Chester	1–3	Wrexham	Sealand Road	6,553	1975–76 Third Division
27 Dec 1976	Wrexham	4–2	Chester	Racecourse Ground	10,000	1976–77 Third Division
8 Apr 1977	Chester	1–2	Wrexham	Sealand Road	11,280	1976–77 Third Division
28 Sep 1977	Chester	1–1	Wrexham	Sealand Road	9,514	1977–78 Third Division
25 Jan 1978	Chester	0–2	Wrexham	Sealand Road	6,921	1977–78 Welsh Cup R4
3 Apr 1978	Wrexham	1–2	Chester	Racecourse Ground	19,125	1977–78 Third Division
4 Apr 1979	Chester	0–1	Wrexham	Sealand Road	7,275	1978–79 Welsh Cup SF
26 Dec 1983	Wrexham	2–0	Chester City	Racecourse Ground	5,756	1983–84 Fourth Division
21 Apr 1984	Chester City	1–0	Wrexham	Sealand Road	3,486	1983–84 Fourth Division
26 Dec 1984	Chester City	2–1	Wrexham	Sealand Road	3,968	1984–85 Fourth Division
6 Apr 1985	Wrexham	2–0	Chester City	Racecourse Ground	3,487	1984–85 Fourth Division
26 Oct 1985	Wrexham	1–1	Chester City	Racecourse Ground	3,500	1985–86 Fourth Division
22 Mar 1986	Chester City	2–1	Wrexham	Sealand Road	4,791	1985–86 Fourth Division
19 Jan 1987	Wrexham	1–2	Chester City	Racecourse Ground	9,265	1986–87 FA Cup R3
23 Mar 1987	Wrexham	1–3 (Note: After Extra Time)	Chester City	Racecourse Ground	5,662	1986–87 Football League Trophy ASF
21 Dec 1988	Chester City	1–2	Wrexham	Sealand Road	3,887	1988–89 Football League Trophy PR
30 Oct 1994	Chester City	1–1	Wrexham	Deva Stadium	4,974	1994–95 Second Division
14 Feb 1995	Wrexham	2–2	Chester City	Racecourse Ground	5,698	1994–95 Second Division
5 Dec 1997	Chester City	0–2	Wrexham	Deva Stadium	3,885	1997–98 FA Cup R2
30 Nov 2004	Chester City	0–1	Wrexham	Deva Stadium	5,028	2004–05 Football League Trophy QF
26 Mar 2006	Wrexham	2–1	Chester City	Racecourse Ground	7,240	2005–06 Football League Two
12 Apr 2006	Chester City	2–1	Wrexham	Deva Stadium	4,801	2005–06 Football League Two
20 Aug 2006	Chester City	1–2	Wrexham	Deva Stadium	4,206	2006–07 Football League Two
18 Feb 2007	Wrexham	0–0	Chester City	Racecourse Ground	6,801	2006–07 Football League Two
25 Nov 2007	Wrexham	2–2	Chester City	Racecourse Ground	7,687	2007–08 Football League Two
9 Mar 2008	Chester City	0–2	Wrexham	Deva Stadium	3,849	2007–08 Football League Two
27 Sep 2009	Wrexham	0–0	Chester City	Racecourse Ground	5,913	2009–10 Football Conference

=== Chester FC vs Wrexham ===
Date	Home	Score	Away	Venue	Att.	Competition
31 Aug 2013	Wrexham	0–2	Chester	Racecourse Ground	6,037	2013–14 Football Conference
19 Apr 2014	Chester	0–0	Wrexham	Deva Stadium	4,326	2013–14 Football Conference
22 Sep 2014	Chester	2–1	Wrexham	Deva Stadium	3,183	2014–15 Football Conference
7 Mar 2015	Wrexham	1–0	Chester	Racecourse Ground	6,336	2014–15 Football Conference
3 Oct 2015	Chester	3–2	Wrexham	Deva Stadium	3,741	2015–16 National League
19 Mar 2016	Wrexham	3–0	Chester	Racecourse Ground	6,459	2015–16 National League
24 Sep 2016	Wrexham	0–0	Chester	Racecourse Ground	5,058	2016–17 National League
21 Jan 2017	Chester	1–1	Wrexham	Deva Stadium	3,961	2016–17 National League
8 Nov 2017	Chester	0–1	Wrexham	Deva Stadium	4,079	2017–18 National League
11 Mar 2018	Wrexham	2–0	Chester	Racecourse Ground	6,511	2017–18 National League

=== Notable fixtures ===
Below are the details for the first ever cross-border derby since Chester's reformation.

31 August 2013
13:00 BST

Wrexham	0–2	Chester
		Linwood 5'; L. Turner 17'

Racecourse Ground, Wrexham
Attendance: 6,037
Referee: Wayne Barratt

GK	1	(Cameroon) Joslain Mayebi
RB	14	(England) Steve Tomassen
CB	5	(England) Mark Creighton	(substituted off) 40'
CB	3	(England) Neil Ashton (c)
LB	16	(England) Johnny Hunt
CM	6	(England) Joe Clarke
CM	4	(Republic of Ireland) Kevin Thornton	(substituted off) 74'
CM	21	(Wales) Rob Evans
RF	10	(England) Brett Ormerod	(substituted off) 58'
CF	9	(England) Andy Bishop		(yellow card) 27'
LF	22	(Wales) Bradley Reid
Substitutes:
GK	13	(England) Andy Coughlin
DF	27	(Cameroon) Junior N'Tamé	(substituted on) 40'
FW	11	(England) Andy Morrell
FW	15	(Wales) Robert Ogleby	(substituted on) 74'
FW	26	(England) Joe Anyinsah	(substituted on) 58'
Manager:
(England) Andy Morrell

GK	1	(England) John Danby
RB	2	(England) Michael Kay
CB	5	(England) Paul Linwood (c)
CB	17	(Gibraltar) Danny Higginbotham	(substituted off) 67'
LB	14	(England) Kevin McIntyre
CM	12	(England) Lewis Turner
CM	6	(England) Danny Harrison
CM	15	(England) Nathan Turner		(yellow card) 88'
AM	24	(England) Jordan Laidler	(substituted off) 46'
CF	9	(England) Ben Mills		(yellow card) 90'
CF	22	(Wales) Alex Titchiner	(substituted off) 69'
Substitutes:
DF	4	(England) George Horan
MF	16	(England) Ashley Williams	(substituted on) 46'	(red card) 84'
MF	25	(England) Aidan Chippendale	(substituted on) 67'
FW	7	(Wales) Jamie Reed
FW	19	(England) Gareth Seddon	(substituted on) 69'
Manager:
(England) Neil Young

Below are the details for the first ever cross-border derby to be televised since Chester's reformation. The game is also notable for its dramatic ending.

22 September 2014
19:45 BST

Chester	2–1	Wrexham
Hobson 74'; Heneghan 90+4'		Hudson 2'

Swansway Chester Stadium, Chester
Attendance: 3,183
Referee: Ross Joyce

GK	1	(England) Jon Worsnop
RB	22	(England) Ben Heneghan
CB	4	(England) Michael Kay
CB	6	(England) Kieran Charnock (c)		(yellow card) 48'
LB	3	(Wales) Gareth Roberts
RM	7	(Republic of Ireland) Craig Mahon	(substituted off) 73'
CM	8	(England) Kingsley James
CM	10	(England) John Rooney		(yellow card) 50'
LM	15	(England) Jadan Hall	(substituted off) 59'
AM	16	(England) Sean McConville
CF	19	(England) Craig Hobson	(substituted off) 83'
Substitutes:
GK	13	(Wales) Connor Roberts
DF	25	(The Gambia) Ibou Touray	(substituted on) 59'
MF	17	(England) Danny Harrison
MF	18	(England) Wayne Riley	(substituted on) 73'
FW	9	(Scotland) Chris Iwelumo	(substituted on) 83'
Manager:
(Scotland) Steve Burr

GK	13	(Austria) Daniel Bachmann		(yellow card) 78'
RB	18	(Wales) Ross White		(yellow card) 42'
CB	5	(England) Blaine Hudson		(yellow card) 50'
CB	4	(England) Manny Smith
LB	3	(England) Neil Ashton (c)
RM	7	(England) Elliott Durrell	(substituted off) 81'
CM	15	(Wales) Rob Evans	(substituted off) 64'
CM	6	(England) Joe Clarke
LM	16	(England) Wes York	(substituted off) 76'
CF	9	(England) Louis Moult
CF	24	(England) Connor Jennings
Substitutes:
DF	14	(England) Steve Tomassen
MF	11	(England) Theo Bailey-Jones	(substituted on) 76'
MF	12	(England) Dean Keates	(substituted on) 64'
FW	10	(England) Andy Bishop
FW	27	(England) Dan Holman	(substituted on) 81'
Manager:
(England) Kevin Wilkin

== Crossing the divide ==
=== Chester City and Wrexham ===
The following players have played for Chester City and Wrexham. Footballers currently playing in one of the teams are marked bold. Appearances and goals include League only.

Player	Chester career	Apps	Goals	Wrexham career	Apps	Goals
Sam Aiston	1997–99	23	0	2007–08, 2008–09	38	0
John Anderson	1960–61	17	15	1956–59, 1961–62	93	80
David Artell	2005–07	80	4	2013, 2013–14	36	3
Jackie Arthur	1946–47	24	3	1946	?	?
Neil Ashton	2009–10	0	0	2010–15	204	9
Anthony Barry	2008–10	43	1	2016–17	31	2
David Bayliss	2004–05	9	0	2005–06	22	0
Wally Bellett	1961–62	12	1	1962–63	2	0
Dean Bennett	2006–08	32	1	2004–06	47	2
Gary Bennett	1985–88, 1990–92, 1997–99	254	64	1992–95, 1997	136	82
Stan Bennion	1963–65	20	3	1959–63	54	18
Chris Blackburn	1999–2003	81	6	2010–11	43	1
Michael Blackwood	1999	9	2	2000–02	46	2
Phil Bolland	2002–06, 2006–08	167	8	2008	18	0
Terry Bradbury	1969–71	90	2	1967–69	78	3
Drewe Broughton	2006–07	14	2	2008	16	2
David Brown	2001–02	13	2	2010–11	9	1
Jack Capper	1959–61	37	0	1949–55	48	0
Paul Carden	2000, 2000–01, 2001–05	166	3	2008	0	0
Paul Comstive	1991–93	57	6	1984–87	99	8
Jonathan Cross	1998–2000	52	1	1991–98	119	12
Geoff Davies	1972–73	32	5	1973–75	67	15
Robert Davies	1888–1891	?	?	1892–1895	?	?
Ian Edwards	1976–79	104	36	1979–82	76	20
Jake Edwards	2006	10	1	1998–2000	11	1
Ken Ellis	1946–47	1	0	1949–50	5	0
George Evans	1963–69	113	0	1955–63	175	9
Robert Evans	1904–05	1	0	1905–06	?	?
Spencer Evans	?	?	?	?	?	?
Steve Fox	1984–85	33	4	1978–82	142	10
Robbie Foy	2005	13	0	2005–06	17	3
Brian Griffiths	1958–59	2	1	1952–58	22	11
Jack Haines	1955–56	47	8	?	?	?
Jay Harris	2008–09	31	0	2010–15, 2020-	182	16
Jim Harvey	1993–94	0	0	1987	6	0
Ron Hewitt	1962–63	29	6	1951–57, 1959–60	231	94
Joe Hinnigan	1988–90	54	2	1987–88	29	1
Reg Holland	1966	6	0	1960–66	118	0
Chris Holroyd	2006–08	47	4	2017–2019	60	16
Richard Hope	2004–05	28	2	2007–08	33	0
Peter Houghton	1985–88	85	13	1984	5	2
Dennis Isherwood	1946–47	3	0	?	?	?
Arthur Johnson	1962	3	0	1960–63	52	0
Colin Jones	1959–60	3	0	1960–1961	0	0
Gordon Jones	?	?	?	1921	1	1
Harvey Jones	1960–61	19	0	1959–60	13	0
Martin Lane	1982–87, 1989–91	274	3	1988	6	0
Paul Linwood	2006–09	122	4	2005	9	0
Jack Lipsham	1903–06, 1907–13, 1919–21	?	?	1913–19	?	?
Gordon Livsey	1971–72	44	0	1967–71	79	0
Brian Lloyd	1977–81	94	0	1971–77	266	0
Stuart Mason	1973–77	137	7	1966, 1968–73	185	3
Billy Matthews	?	?	?	?	?	?
Jimmy McGill	1962–64	32	0	1964	17	0
Tony McLoughlin	1967–68	4	0	1966–67	29	9
Sammy McMillan	1969–70	18	0	1963–67	149	52
Mike Metcalf	1963–69	221	68	1957–63	121	58
Grenville Millington	1968–69, 1973–82, 1983	290	0	1983–84	13	0
Ian Moir	1967–68	25	3	1968–72, 1973–75	165	20
Elfed Morris	1962–68	167	69	1960–62	9	6
Bill Myerscough	1962–63	36	10	1963–64	35	5
Sean Newton	2007–08	2	0	2015–2017	61	8
Roger Preece	1990–96	170	4	1986–90	111	12
Andy Provan	1968–70	82	18	1970–72	51	10
Bernard Purdie	1971–73	63	14	1968–70	10	3
Dennis Reeves	1963–67	139	0	1967–69	15	0
Gordon Richards	1958–61	74	16	1952–58	96	24
Nick Richardson	1994, 1995–2001	181	13	1994	4	2
Kevin Roberts	2006-09	81	7	2017-2019	72	0
John Ruddy	2005–06	4	0	2007	5	0
Ian Rush	1978–80	34	14	1998–99	17	0
Paul Rutherford	2005–2009	38	1	2016–2021	126	6
Mike Salmon	1982	16	0	1987, 1987–89	100	0
Ronnie Sinclair	1996–98	70	0	1984	11	0
Fred Smallwood	1934–35	1	0	1933–34	1	1
Alex Smith	1998–99, 2003–04	52	6	2004–06	44	0
Dean Spink	2000–02	21	2	1997–2000	85	9
George Spruce	1958–61	63	0	1948–52	135	3
Steve Stacey	1969	1	0	1966–69	105	6
Tommy Tilston	1949–51	22	7	1951–54	78	29
Brian Tinnion	1971–72	3	0	1968–76	279	54
Graham Turner	1968–73	218	5	1964–68	77	0
Jonathan Walters	2006–07	26	9	2005–06	38	5
Gavin Ward	2007–08	0	0	2008–09	54	0
Keith Webber	1969–71	74	14	1964–66	73	33
Don Weston	1968–69	3	0	1958–60, 1966–68	84	40
Ashley Westwood	2006–08	21	3	2008–10	61	3
Shaun Whalley	2004–05	3	0	2008–09	16	4
Billy White	1961–62	13	3	1961	8	0
Danny Williams	2004	5	0	1999–2001, 2004–08	166	14
Mike Williams	1982–84	34	4	1984–91	178	3
Barry Wright	1962–63	1	0	1959–62	11	0
Dick Yates	1946–47	52	37	1947–48	31	18

=== Chester FC and Wrexham ===
The following players have played for Chester FC and Wrexham. Footballers currently playing in one of the teams are marked bold. Appearances and goals include League only.

Player	Chester career	Apps	Goals	Wrexham career	Apps	Goals
Wes Baynes	2011–13	62	8	2007–11	74	8
James Caton	2014	1	1	2015–2016	4	0
Elliott Durrell	2016–17	46	8	2014–2015	30	4
Gareth Evans	2010–11	1	0	2004–09	26	0
Luke Holden	2011–12	3	2	2010	15	1
Blaine Hudson	2016–17	32	2	2014-16	73	7
Johnny Hunt	2015–17	92	4	2010–14, 2014–15	108	13
Jason Jarrett	2013–14	29	0	1999–2000	1	0
Danny Livesey	2018–2019	0	0	2014	16	0
Levi Mackin	2012–13	16	1	2003–09	61	2
Danny O'Brien	2016	9	1	2015	2	0
Jamie Reed	2013–14	22	2	2005–08	7	0
John Rooney	2013–16	112	25	2016–17	33	11
Christian Smith	2011–12	31	6	2008–09, 2009–11	42	7
Lee Trundle	2013	3	0	2001–03	94	27
Dominic Vose	2018-	5	0	2015–16	28	10
Marc Williams	2012–13	50	10	2005–11	80	17

=== Chester City, Chester and Wrexham ===
The following players have played for Chester City, Chester FC and Wrexham. Footballers currently playing in one of the teams are marked bold. Appearances and goals include League only.

Player	Chester City career	Apps	Goals	Chester career	Apps	Goals	Wrexham career	Apps	Goals
Paul Linwood	2006–09	122	4	2012–14	58	2	2005	9	0
Kevin Roberts	2006-09	81	7	2019-	0	0	2017-2019	72	0

== Derby appearances and goals ==
=== Chester FC vs Wrexham ===
Below shows the most appeared players and most goals scored within a derby match between Chester and Wrexham. Appearances and Goals include all competitions.

==== Top all time appearances ====
After the match played 11 March 2018.

Player	Years	Played For	Apps
John Rooney	2013–16; 2016–17	(England) Chester (Wales) Wrexham	7
Mark Carrington	2013–21	(Wales) Wrexham	7
Blaine Hudson	2014–16; 2016–17	(Wales) Wrexham (England) Chester	6
Johnny Hunt	2010–14, 2014–15; 2015–17	(Wales) Wrexham (England) Chester	6
Rob Evans	2012–17	(Wales) Wrexham	6
Craig Mahon	2013–2020	(England) Chester	6
Manny Smith	2014-2016, 2017-2020	(Wales) Wrexham	6
Ryan Astles	2016-18	(England) Chester	5
Neil Ashton	2010–15	(Wales) Wrexham	4
Joe Clarke	2011–15	(Wales) Wrexham	4
Ben Heneghan	2014–16	(England) Chester	4
Connor Jennings	2014–16	(Wales) Wrexham	4
Paul Rutherford	2016-	(Wales) Wrexham	4
Tom Shaw	2015–2018	(England) Chester	4
Wesley York	2014–16	(Wales) Wrexham	4

==== All time goal scorers ====
After the match played 11 March 2018.

Player	Years	Played For	Goals
Connor Jennings	2014–16	(Wales) Wrexham	2
John Rooney	2013–16; 2016–17	(England) Chester (Wales) Wrexham	1+1
Blaine Hudson	2014–16; 2016–17	(Wales) Wrexham (England) Chester	1+0
Dominic Vose	2015–16; 2018	(Wales) Wrexham (England) Chester	1+0
James Alabi	2016–17	(England) Chester	1
Nicky Deverdics	2018–19	(Wales) Wrexham	1
Rob Evans	2012–17	(Wales) Wrexham	1
Ben Heneghan	2014–16	(England) Chester	1
Craig Hobson	2014–16	(England) Chester	1
Kayden Jackson	2015–16	(Wales) Wrexham	1
Paul Linwood	2012–14	(England) Chester	1
Kieron Morris	2015	(Wales) Wrexham	1
Shaun Pearson	2017-	(Wales) Wrexham	1
Scott Quigley	2018	(Wales) Wrexham	1
Kane Richards	2014–17	(England) Chester	1
Tom Shaw	2015–2018	(England) Chester	1
Lewis Turner	2013, 2013–14	(England) Chester	1
