= Raybould =

Raybould is a surname. Notable people with the surname include:

- Billy Raybould (born 1944), Welsh rugby union player
- Clarence Raybould (1886–1972), English conductor, composer and pianist
- Dell Raybould, American politician
- Elizabeth Raybould, British nurse and writer
- Eric Raybould, English footballer
- Jane Michele Raybould, Nebraska politician
- Jody Wilson-Raybould, Canadian lawyer, author, and former politician
- John Raybould (born 1934), English cricketer
- Ryan Raybould (born 1983), American soccer player
- Sam Raybould (1875–1949), English footballer
- Tom Raybould (1884–1944), English footballer
- William Raybould (c. 1836 – 1886), Canadian miner, merchant and politician
