= Ralph Gubbins =

English footballer

Personal information
- Full name: Ralph Grayham Gubbins
- Date of birth: 31 January 1932
- Place of birth: Ellesmere Port, England
- Date of death: 11 September 2011 (aged 79)
- Position: Inside forward

Youth career
- Shell Mex

Senior career*
Years	Team	Apps	(Gls)
1952–1959	Bolton Wanderers	97	(15)
1959–1961	Hull City	45	(10)
1961–1964	Tranmere Rovers	107	(37)
1964–1965	Wigan Athletic	30	(7)
Total		279	(69)
- * Club domestic league appearances and goals

Ralph Grayham Gubbins (31 January 1932 – 11 September 2011) was an English professional footballer who played as an inside forward. Gubbins made nearly 250 appearances in the Football League for three clubs between 1952 and 1964, before playing non-league football.

== Career ==
Born in Ellesmere Port, Gubbins played in the Football League for Bolton Wanderers, Hull City and Tranmere Rovers, before playing non-league football with Wigan Athletic.

While at Bolton, Gubbins replaced the injured Nat Lofthouse for the 1958 FA Cup Semi final, scoring both goals that sent Bolton to the final. Lofthouse returned for the final, which Bolton won. He spent one season in the Cheshire League with Wigan, scoring 7 goals in 30 league games.

He died on 11 September 2011.
