= Doug Holden =

English footballer (1930–2021)

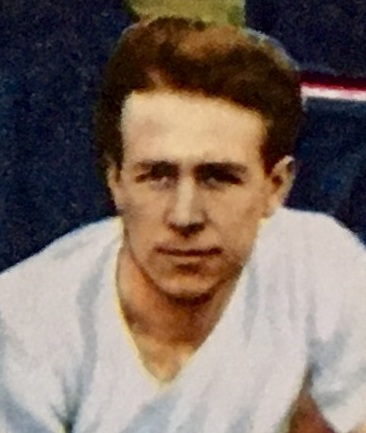

Personal information
- Full name: Albert Douglas Holden
- Date of birth: 28 September 1930
- Place of birth: Manchester, Lancashire, England
- Date of death: 7 April 2021 (aged 90)
- Position: Winger

Senior career*
Years	Team	Apps	(Gls)
1950–1962	Bolton Wanderers	419	(40)
1962–1965	Preston North End	89	(13)
Total		508	(53)

International career
1959	England	5	(0)
- * Club domestic league appearances and goals

Albert Douglas Holden (28 September 1930 – 7 April 2021) was an English professional footballer who played as a winger.

== Football career ==
Holden began his professional playing career with Bolton Wanderers in 1951. He made over 400 appearances for Bolton, and was on the losing side in the famous 4–3 loss to Blackpool in the "Matthews Cup Final" and then on the winning side in the 1958 FA Cup Final against Manchester United. He was the last surviving player from the 1953 FA Cup final.

With five international caps to his name, Holden was recognised as one of the top wingers of his generation, with the ability to play on either wing. After Bolton he moved to Preston North End, scoring a goal in their 1964 FA Cup Final defeat against West Ham United.

Holden remained at Deepdale until the summer of 1965, when he emigrated to Australia, where he played for Hakoah of Sydney until 1968. He then became Hakoah's coach, before moving to coach Auburn F.C. He finished his coaching career in Australia with Sydney City Soccer Club, before returning to England in 1970, where he had a spell coaching with Grimsby Town. He was appointed manager of Southern League Dartford in June 1972 but was sacked in August 1973 despite winning the Kent Senior Cup.

== Honours ==
Bolton Wanderers

- FA Cup: 1957–58; runner-up: 1952–53

Preston North End

- FA Cup runner-up: 1963–64
