= Tony Field =

Tony Field may refer to:

- Tony Field (footballer, born 1942), English football forward from Chester
- Tony Field (footballer, born 1946) (1946–2026), English football striker from Halifax
- Anthony Field (born 1963), Australian musician and actor

== See also ==
- Tony Fields (1958–1995), American dancer
- Tony Fields II (born 1999), American football player
