= Billy Wilson (footballer, born 1936) =

Northern Ireland footballer (1936–2025)

Personal information
- Full name: William Wilson
- Date of birth: 23 September 1936
- Place of birth: Portadown, Northern Ireland
- Date of death: 11 July 2025 (aged 88)
- Position(s): Wing half

Senior career*
Years	Team	Apps	(Gls)
1952–1955	Portadown	?	(?)
1955–1958	Burnley	2	(0)
1958–1964	Linfield	?	(?)
1964–1965	Ballymena United	?	(?)
- * Club domestic league appearances and goals

William Wilson (23 September 1936 – 11 July 2025) was a professional footballer from Northern Ireland. He played as a wing half.

== Career ==
Wilson started his career with his hometown club, Portadown, and made his debut for the club at the age of 16. In 1955, Wilson moved to England to join Football League First Division side Burnley and initially played in the reserves. He made his first appearance for the senior team in a 1–0 defeat to Blackpool on 1 May 1957, alongside fellow debutant Jim Appleby. Wilson played only one more match for Burnley, deputising for regular right-half Bobby Seith for a 7–0 loss against Nottingham Forest on 18 September 1957. He was released from his contract in May 1958 and despite interest from Crewe Alexandra and Notts County, he returned to Northern Ireland and signed for Linfield.

Wilson spent six years at Linfield, including the 1961–62 season during which the team won seven trophies. He almost received a call-up to the Northern Ireland national team for the 1958 FIFA World Cup, but was not selected due to the inclusion of Derek Dougan. Wilson departed Windsor Park in the summer of 1964 and subsequently spent some time with Ballymena United before retiring from football.

He returned to Linfield for a spell as a coach.

== Later life and death ==
Wilson later became a school teacher, specialising in physical education. He died on 11 July 2025, at the age of 88.

== Sources ==
- Simpson, Ray (20 November 2007). The Clarets Chronicles: The Definitive History of Burnley Football Club 1882–2007. Burnley Football Club. ISBN 978-0-9557468-0-2. OCLC 1391280671. OL 28268126M.
- "Interview : Billy's seven trophy success eclipsed World Cup heartache". Linfield F.C. 7 October 2008. Archived from the original on 30 September 2011.
