= Bryan Edwards (footballer, born 1930) =

English footballer and manager (1930–2016)

Personal information
- Date of birth: 27 October 1930
- Place of birth: Woodlesford, Leeds, England
- Date of death: 21 June 2016 (aged 85)
- Position: Wing half

Senior career*
Years	Team	Apps	(Gls)
1947–1965	Bolton Wanderers	483	(8)

Managerial career
- 1971–1975: Bradford City
- * Club domestic league appearances and goals

Bryan Edwards (27 October 1930 – 21 June 2016) was an English football player and manager. He played 518 games for Bolton Wanderers picking up an FA Cup Winners medal in 1958 and later managed Bradford City and was a coach and physiotherapist at several clubs.

He had a beloved wife Jean Edwards, with whom he had two sons - Ian and Steve. Alongside grandchildren and great grandchildren.

== Playing career ==
Edwards excelled at both football and cricket and had trials for both sports, at Bolton Wanderers and Yorkshire CCC in 1947. He joined Bolton and signed a full-time professional contract in October 1947. He stayed at Burnden Park for 18 years, although his career was interrupted by two years National Service, winning an FA Cup winners medal in 1958 when Bolton defeated Manchester United 2–0. He made 483 league appearances and 518 in all league and cup games mostly as a wing half before later playing as a centre half retiring in 1965, aged 35.

== Managerial career ==
When Edwards retired he first joined Blackpool as assistant trainer-coach before moving to Preston North End first as coach and later first-team trainer. He moved to Plymouth Argyle as chief coach, before becoming manager at Bradford City in November 1971.

He took over with City struggling towards the bottom of Division Three but he could not arrest the slide and the club were relegated in bottom place in the 1971–72 season. The club came 16th the following season and 8th in 1973–74 before Edwards resigned in January 1975 to be replaced by Bobby Kennedy.

He became a qualified physiotherapist and served as physio and coach at Huddersfield Town and youth team coach at Leeds United before returning to Bradford City in July 1977. He filled a host of roles at Valley Parade including physio, assistant manager, and general manager.

== Later life ==
He died in June 2016, aged 85.

== Managerial statistics ==
Team	Nat	Year	Record				
Team	Nat	Year	G	W	D	L	Win %
Bradford City	(England)	1971–1975	167	56	42	69	33.53
Career Total			167	56	42	69	33.53

== Honours ==
Bolton Wanderers

- FA Cup: 1957–58
