= John Higgins (footballer, born 1932) =

English footballer (1932–2005)

Personal information
- Date of birth: 15 October 1932
- Place of birth: Bakewell, Derbyshire, England
- Date of death: 22 April 2005 (aged 72)
- Place of death: Macclesfield, Cheshire, England
- Position: Defender

Senior career*
Years	Team	Apps	(Gls)
1949–1950	Buxton		
1950–1961	Bolton Wanderers	183	(0)
1961–1963	Wigan Athletic	77	(1)
1963–1965	Altrincham		
Total		260	(1)
- * Club domestic league appearances and goals

John Higgins (15 October 1932 – 22 April 2005) was an English professional footballer who played mainly in central defence. Born in Bakewell, Higgins was brought up in Buxton, Derbyshire, and began his football career with local club Buxton. He later played for Bolton Wanderers in the Football League between 1952 and 1961. He played in Bolton's 2–0 win over Manchester United in the 1958 FA Cup Final. In 1961, he joined Wigan Athletic, and went on to play 77 Cheshire League games in two seasons at the club. He then spent two seasons with fellow Cheshire League club Altrincham.

== Honours ==
Bolton Wanderers

- FA Cup: 1957–58
