= Roy Hartle =

English footballer

Personal information
- Date of birth: 4 October 1931
- Place of birth: Catshill, Worcestershire, England
- Date of death: 5 November 2014 (aged 83)
- Place of death: Bolton, England
- Position: Right back

Youth career
- Bromsgrove Rovers
- Bolton Wanderers

Senior career*
| Years | Team | Apps | (Gls) |
| 1952–1966 | Bolton Wanderers | 447 | (11) |
| | Buxton | ? | (?) |
| 1967 | New York Generals | 3 | (0) |
- * Club domestic league appearances and goals

Roy Hartle (4 October 1931 – 5 November 2014) was an English professional footballer, mainly playing at right-back.

Hartle signed for these clubs during his career: Bolton Wanderers as a sixteen-year-old from non-league Bromsgrove Rovers and went on to become a stalwart, representing the club in 499 games in all competitions. His achievements include a 1958 FA Cup Final winner's medal, playing in the side that beat Manchester United 2–0.

After a spell in the US with the New York Generals as a player/coach, he called time on his playing career and was appointed as Chief Scout at Bury after turning down other job offers with the likes of Stoke City and Grimsby Town.

Appearing in Bolton's Hall of Fame and having a club suite at the Macron Stadium named in his honour, he died on 5 November 2014 at the age of 83, after spending time at a local nursing home following a long illness.

== Honours ==
Bolton Wanderers

- FA Cup: 1957–58
