= Dennis Keating =

Irish footballer

Personal information
- Full name: Dennis Joseph Keating
- Date of birth: 18 October 1940 (age 86)
- Place of birth: Cork, Ireland
- Position: Winger

Youth career
- Saltney Juniors

Senior career*
Years	Team	Apps	(Gls)
1962–1963	Chester	1	(0)
- Wellington Town
- * Club domestic league appearances and goals

Dennis Keating (born 18 October 1940) is an Irish former footballer.

== Career ==
Keating made one appearance in The Football League for Chester against Bradford City in October 1962, alongside fellow debutant Jimmy McGill. He then appeared in an FA Cup tie against Tranmere Rovers before quickly moving on to Wellington Town. He later gave up football to become a monk.

== Bibliography ==
- Sumner, Chas (1997). On the Borderline: The Official History of Chester City F.C. 1885-1997. Yore Publications. ISBN 978-1-874427-52-0.
