= Derek Owen =

English footballer

Personal information
- Date of birth: 25 September 1938 (age 88)
- Place of birth: Ellesmere Port, England
- Position: Goalkeeper

Senior career*
Years	Team	Apps	(Gls)
1956–1957	Ellesmere Port Town		
1957–1958	Liverpool		
1958–1961	Chester	7	(0)
1961–?	Tranmere Rovers		

International career
1957	England Youth	1	
- * Club domestic league appearances and goals

Derek Owen (born 25 September 1938) is an English former footballer who played as a goalkeeper. He made seven appearances in The Football League. Started at Ellesmere Port Town in 1956 and at the same time joined Liverpool Youth team in 1956. Signed by Liverpool from [Ellesmere Port] in 1957. Played for England Youth team in 1957. Signed by Chester from Liverpool in 1958, he made his professional debut in a 2–2 draw at Walsall on 11 September 1958. He became the third Chester goalkeeper to appear for the first team that season after Brian Biggins and Keith Griffiths, but new signing Ron Howells was to become regular keeper from the next game and Owen did not reappear until the final match of the 1959–60 season against Southport.

In 1960–61 Owen managed five league appearances and one FA Cup outing as he played second fiddle to Willie Brown. He did not play for the club again and moved on to Tranmere Rovers.

== Bibliography ==
- Sumner, Chas (1997). On the Borderline: The Official History of Chester City F.C. 1885-1997. Yore Publications. ISBN 978-1-874427-52-0.
