= Reg Barton =

English footballer

Personal information
- Full name: Charles Reginald Barton
- Date of birth: 4 March 1942 (age 84)
- Place of birth: Chester, England
- Height: 5 ft 10 in (1.78 m)
- Position: Goalkeeper

Youth career
- 1957–1961: Chester

Senior career*
| Years | Team | Apps | (Gls) |
| 1961–1965 | Chester | 14 | (0) |
| 1965–19?? | Nantlle Vale | | |
- Holyhead Town
- Penmaenmawr
- Connah's Quay Nomads
- * Club domestic league appearances and goals

Reg Barton (born 4 March 1942) is an English former professional footballer who played as a goalkeeper. He made 14 appearances in the Football League for his hometown club, Chester.

== Playing career ==
A lifelong Chester fan, Barton signed for the club in 1957 and progressed through the ranks to turn professional four years later. He made his first team debut in a 3–2 home defeat to Doncaster Rovers on 27 September 1961 in place of regular goalkeeper John Hardie. Over the following years his league opportunities were limited as he faced competition from Hardie, Frank Adams, Arthur Johnson and Dennis Reeves.

Barton enjoyed a rare run in goal for Chester late in the 1964–65 season, which included a 6–1 win over arch rivals Wrexham. But Barton later conceded five goals in successive league losses to Darlington and Crewe Alexandra and was released at the end of the season.

After leaving Chester, Barton played for Nantlle Vale, Holyhead Town, Penmaenmawr and Connah's Quay Nomads. Away from football he worked for companies including British Aerospace while living in Buckley and continued to watch Chester regularly.
