= Neville Bannister =

English footballer

Personal information
- Full name: Neville Bannister
- Date of birth: 21 July 1937 (age 89)
- Place of birth: Brierfield, Lancashire, England
- Height: 5 ft 5 in (1.65 m)
- Position: Outside right

Youth career
- –: Bolton Wanderers

Senior career*
Years	Team	Apps	(Gls)
1955–1961	Bolton Wanderers	26	(4)
1961–1964	Lincoln City	68	(16)
1964–1965	Hartlepools United	41	(8)
1965–1966	Rochdale	19	(2)
1966–1968	Fleetwood	44	(4)
- * Club domestic league appearances and goals

Neville Bannister (born 21 July 1937) is an English former footballer who scored 30 goals from 154 appearances in the Football League playing as an outside right for Bolton Wanderers, Lincoln City, Hartlepools United and Rochdale.

Bannister came through the junior teams at Bolton Wanderers and made his debut in the 1955–56 season. He scored the second goal, and set up the fourth for Nat Lofthouse, as Bolton beat league champions Wolverhampton Wanderers 4–1 in the 1958 FA Charity Shield. Lincoln City signed him in 1961 in what proved an unsuccessful attempt to avoid relegation from the Second Division. He also played league football for Hartlepools United and Rochdale before moving into non-league with Lancashire Combination club Fleetwood. He went on to become chairman of Blackpool Rangers Juniors F.C.
