= St Helens & District Football Combination =

Association football league in England

- Sport: Association football
- Founded: 1917
- Folded: 2016
- No. of teams: 15 (final season)
- Country: England

The St Helens & District Football Combination was an English football league based in St Helens, Merseyside.

== History ==
The league was formed on 4 August 1917 when Ernest Worrall distributed notices to several of his friends & colleagues calling a meeting in the old LMS Club now known as The British Rail Club, Penlake Lane, Sutton. A league was formed but was initially known as The St Helens & District Junior Football League. The officers were Harry Thompson (Chairman), John Marsh (President) & Ernest Worrall (Gen Secretary).

The League Championship Cup dates back to the year 1917 but in 1919, Mr John Martin, a town centre hairdresser, presented the “Martin Cup” to the league. This Cup competition became immediately very popular especially in the 1930-1940 period when crowd numbers reached 3000–4000.

In 1921, a restructure of the divisions resulted in the division 1 clubs being formed into the St Helens “Senior” league and a further amalgamation saw Div1 and Div2 clubs having sections A & B thus forming the combination of sections. At the end of the 1921/22 season following a special meeting it was decided to run the league similar to that of the neighboring Lancashire Alliance thus the St Helens and & District Junior League now became The St Helens & District Football Combination to commence in "March 1923”. Running parallel with the Combination in the late 1920s and throughout the 1930s and early 1940s was the Sunday School League in which the majority of the church clubs took part.

Clubs in the Sunday School League played for the Hewitt Cup (origin unknown) and players received a silver and enamel medal.

When that league finished clubs like Holy Cross and Holy Trinity eventually joined the combination.

In 1926, the Hospitals Charity Cup was introduced and is now the Combinations main cup competition and played for in open tournament for all combination clubs. In 1926 the Rainford Potteries Company donated to the Rainford Potteries Cup which at present is at temporary retirement. The DH Griffiths & Tom Worrall cup (1933) is the present Divisional Cups played for to coincide into an end of season final.

In the 1930s the most popular cup venue was Peasley Cross Rec, but since the loss of the ground due to industrial building several well-known venues were used; e.g. British Rail, (Penlake Sutton), Beecham's (Sutton Road), Greenall Whitley (Alder Hey Road) and at each ground, the attendance was outstanding. Finally at the eventual loss of these grounds the Hospital Cup Final which had become the Combination's F.A. Cup was held at St Helens Town Hoghton Road, but sadly, as progress is inevitable the “Town Ground” is no longer available, but up to the present moment Prescot Cables have come to the rescue and the Hospital Cup Final at Valerie Park Prescot has now become a very popular venue.

In the pre-war years, local clubs included British Sidac, Greenalls FC, Haydock C&B Recs, Haydock Villa (who won five trophies in the 1937–38 season), Derbyshire Hill Rovers, Holy Cross, Holy Trinity, Beechams, and Pilkingtons. During World War II, the Combination continued to organize football, though operations were limited due to a shortage of clubs and players. Official league rules were suspended, and a "Home Guard" section was formed to accommodate up to eight clubs. Following World War II, regular league operations resumed.

Alf Moran served as a long-term chairman alongside secretary Jock Craig and President Tom Gordon, MBE. Subsequent presidents have included John Marsh, Hugh Collins, Harry Wimpenny, Tom Gordon, Gerald Seddon, and Bert Rawsthorne. Chairmen have included Harry Thompson, Arthur Fenton, Gus Atkins, Alf Moran, Gil Ryan, and Eric Bond. The role of secretary has been held by Ernie Worrall, Peter Smith, E. Bradbury, R. Williams, Ernie Baines, Jim Craig, David Watkins, and Robert Deakin, while W. Leyland, Roddie Winstanley, Harry Wimpenny, John May, Jim Craig, J. Dutton, Gil Ryan, Derek Roughley, and Derek Cleveland have served as treasurers.

== Final Seasons ==
The Combination, which eventually comprised 15 clubs, expanded steadily following its formation more than 75 years earlier before declined and ultimately folding in 2016 because of a shortage of teams. During its existence, the league provided playing opportunities for numerous footballers at amateur development levels, reflecting its role in grassroots football.

Its clubs have won Liverpool County FA & Lancashire County FA Cup Competitions. Its Youth and Open Age Inter League sides, have lifted Liverpool County FA & Lancashire County FA Trophies and a number of players have gone on to play in the Football League.

During the 2010–2011 season, Division Two club Mere recorded an unbeaten campaign, in their debut season in the St Helens Combination. After playing twenty games, their record was nineteen wins, one draw and no losses, scoring exactly one hundred goals in the process. An achievement never attained by any other club in the history of the league.

Knowsley South were treble winners in the 2010–2011 season.

Winners of the Premier Division for 2015–2016 were New Street Reserves.

Winners of Division One for 2015–2016 were Cheshire Lines Reserves.

When the league folded some clubs transferred to the Warrington & District Football League.

== Famous past players ==
Sammy Lynn, Bert Redwood, Bill Foulkes, Tommy O’Neil (Manchester United), Derek Hennin (Bolton Wanderers), Ray Ranson, Gary Owen (Manchester City), John Connelly (Burnley and Manchester United), Eric Moore (Everton), Bill Pilling, Alan A’Court (Liverpool), Geoff Nulty (Everton & Newcastle United), Mick Davock, Jim (Packy) Morris (Stockport County), John Quinn (Sheffield Wednesday), Mark Harris (Wrexham), Jay Parker (Chelsea 'B')and Craig Cunningham (Wigan Athletic)

== Clubs ==
Premier Division

- Boilermakers Arms
- Clock Face Miners
- New Street Reserves
- Old Mill
- Parr Conservative
- Prescot Sun Inn
- Tanner Athletic
- West Park

First Division

- Bold Rangers
- Cheshire Lines Reserves
- Ecclesfield FC
- Manor Athletic
- Rockware
- Sutton Junction
- West Park Reserves
