= Tom Raybould =

English footballer

Personal information
- Full name: Thomas Raybould
- Date of birth: July 1884
- Place of birth: Wilden, Worcestershire, England
- Date of death: 1944 (aged 59–60)
- Position: Wing half

Senior career*
| Years | Team | Apps | (Gls) |
| 1904–1905 | Kidderminster Harriers | | |
| 1905–1907 | Wolverhampton Wanderers | 15 | (1) |
| 1907–1908 | Grimsby Town | 0 | (0) |
| 1908–1909 | Worksop Town | | |
| 1909 | Stourbridge | | |
| Total | | 15 | (1) |
- * Club domestic league appearances and goals

Thomas Raybould (July 1884 – 1944) was an English footballer who played in the Football League for Wolverhampton Wanderers.
