= George McGowan (Scottish footballer) =

Scottish footballer

Personal information
- Full name: George McGowan
- Date of birth: 30 November 1943
- Place of birth: Carluke, Scotland
- Date of death: 20 November 2009 (aged 65)
- Place of death: Wrexham, Wales
- Position: Centre forward

Youth career
- Preston North End

Senior career*
Years	Team	Apps	(Gls)
1962–1964	Chester	18	(3)
1964–1965	Stockport County	5	(0)
- Rhyl
Total		23	(3)
- * Club domestic league appearances and goals

George McGowan was a Scottish footballer, who played as a centre forward in the Football League for Chester and Stockport County.
