= Robert Davies (footballer, born 1869) =

Welsh footballer

Personal information
- Full name: Robert Davies
- Date of birth: 1869
- Place of birth: Caergwrle, Wales
- Date of death: 1930s
- Position: Forward

Senior career*
Years	Team	Apps	(Gls)
1888–1891	Chester		
1891–1892	Caergwrle		
1892–1895	Wrexham		
1895–1913	Caergwrle		

International career
1892	Wales	2	(0)
- * Club domestic league appearances and goals

Robert Davies (born 1869) was a Welsh footballer who played as a forward for Chester and Wrexham in the 1880s and 1890s. He also made two appearances for Wales in 1892.

== Football career ==
Davies was born in Caergwrle, about 5 miles north of Wrexham. He started his career with Chester in 1888 before joining his village team in 1891. He then spent two years with Wrexham where he was considered to be a "capable" winger who had pace and showed "neat skills".

His first international appearance came on 27 February 1892, when he was selected to play against Ireland; the match ended with the scores level with one goal each. Davies retained his place for the next match against England which ended in a 2–0 victory for the English. The English team consisted mainly of players associated with the Corinthian club, who were "a little too skilful for the Welsh". Davies himself was described as "weak" in his international appearances.

In 1893, he was part of the Wrexham side who won the Welsh Cup, defeating Chirk 2–1. Wrexham next reached the final in 1895, but this time lost 3–2 to Newtown. This was Davies' final appearance for Wrexham.

In 1895, he returned to playing for his village team, and was still playing in 1913.

== International appearances ==
Davies made two appearances for Wales in international matches, as follows:

Date	Venue	Opponent	Result	Goals	Competition
27 February 1892	Penrhyn Park, Bangor	Ireland	1–1	0	British Home Championship
5 March 1892	Racecourse Ground, Wrexham	England	0–2	0	British Home Championship

Win	Draw	Loss

== Career outside football ==
Before becoming a professional footballer, Davies was a coal-miner. He was also a keen cricketer who was a notable bowler for Caergwrle Cricket Club.

== Honours ==
Wrexham

- Welsh Cup winners: 1893
- Welsh Cup finalists: 1895
