= 1958 FA Cup final =

- Event: 1957–58 FA Cup
| Bolton Wanderers | Manchester United |
| 2 | 0 |
- Date: 3 May 1958
- Venue: Wembley Stadium, London
- Referee: Jack Sherlock
- Attendance: 99,756

The 1958 FA Cup final was contested on 3 May 1958 by Bolton Wanderers and Manchester United at Wembley Stadium, London, in front of a crowd of almost 100,000. The referee was J. Sherlock. Bolton won 2–0, with a double by Nat Lofthouse, who scored the goals in the 3rd and 55th minutes. United, who had lost the previous final to Aston Villa, had been devastated three months earlier by the Munich air disaster, and fielded only four crash survivors, along with several newcomers. Just two players featured in the United side from the previous year's final; six of them were among the dead (along with two others who had not played), two were injured to such an extent that they never played again, while another had not yet fully recovered from his injuries.

The second Bolton goal was a source of considerable controversy as it resulted from the Manchester United goalkeeper Harry Gregg being bundled over the goal line by Lofthouse. Goalkeepers were, at that time, much less protected from physical contact with opponents. The resulting debate was one of the high-profile incidents that led eventually to increased protections for goalkeepers.

Not one of Bolton's eleven players in the cup-winning team had cost the club a transfer fee. Five of them were full internationals. Only Nat Lofthouse and Doug Holden remained from the Bolton team that had lost to Blackpool in the Matthews Final five years earlier.

== Road to Wembley ==
As First Division clubs, both teams entered the competition at the third round stage.

| Bolton Wanderers | | | Manchester United | |
| Opposition | Goalscorer(s) | Round | Opposition | Goalscorer(s) |
|---|---|---|---|---|
| 4 January 1958; Preston North End [D1] A 3–0 | Stevens; Parry (2) | Round Three | 4 January 1958; Workington [D3N] A 3–1 | Viollet (3) |
| 25 January 1958; York City [D3N] A 0–0 | | Round Four | 25 January 1958; Ipswich Town [D2] H 2–0 | Charlton (2) |
| 29 January 1958; York City [D3N] H 3–0 | Birch; Allcock (2) | Replay | 25 January 1958; Ipswich Town [D2] H 2–0 | Charlton (2) |
| 15 February 1958; Stoke City [D2] H 3–1 | Lofthouse; Stevens; Parry | Round Five | 19 February 1958; Sheffield Wednesday [D1] H 3–0 | Brennan (2); Dawson |
| 1 March 1958; Wolverhampton Wanderers [D1] H 2–1 | Stevens; Parry | Quarter finals | 1 March 1958; West Bromwich Albion [D1] A 2–2 | Dawson; Taylor |
| 1 March 1958; Wolverhampton Wanderers [D1] H 2–1 | Stevens; Parry | Replay | 5 March 1958; West Bromwich Albion [D1] H 1–0 | Webster |
| 22 March 1958; Blackburn Rovers [D2] Maine Road, Manchester; 2–1 | Gubbins (2) | Semi finals | 22 March 1958; Fulham [D2] Villa Park, Birmingham; 2–2 | Charlton (2) |
| 22 March 1958; Blackburn Rovers [D2] Maine Road, Manchester; 2–1 | Gubbins (2) | Replay | 26 March 1958; Fulham [D2] Highbury, North London; 5–3 | Dawson (3); Brennan; Charlton |

- Square brackets [ ] represent the opposition's division

== Match details ==
3 May 1958

| Bolton Wanderers | 2–0 | Manchester United |
|---|---|---|
| Lofthouse 3', 50' | (Report) |

Wembley Stadium, London
Attendance: 99,756
Referee: Jack Sherlock

| Bolton Wanderers | Manchester United |

| GK | 1 | (England) Eddie Hopkinson |
| RB | 2 | (England) Roy Hartle |
| LB | 3 | (England) Tommy Banks |
| RH | 4 | (England) Derek Hennin |
| CH | 5 | (England) John Higgins |
| LH | 6 | (England) Bryan Edwards |
| OR | 7 | (England) Brian Birch |
| IR | 8 | (England) Dennis Stevens |
| CF | 9 | (England) Nat Lofthouse (c) |
| IL | 10 | (England) Ray Parry |
| OL | 11 | (England) Doug Holden |
Manager:
(England) Bill Ridding

| GK | 1 | (Northern Ireland) Harry Gregg |
| RB | 2 | (England) Bill Foulkes (c) |
| LB | 3 | (England) Ian Greaves |
| RH | 4 | (England) Freddie Goodwin |
| CH | 5 | (England) Ronnie Cope |
| LH | 6 | (England) Stan Crowther |
| OR | 7 | (Scotland) Alex Dawson |
| IR | 8 | (England) Ernie Taylor |
| CF | 9 | (England) Bobby Charlton |
| IL | 10 | (England) Dennis Viollet |
| OL | 11 | (Wales) Colin Webster |
Manager:
(Wales) Jimmy Murphy
