= John Watson (footballer, born 1942) =

Welsh footballer

Personal information
- Date of birth: 2 May 1942 (age 84)
- Place of birth: Ruabon, Wales
- Position: Full back

Youth career
- 1959–1960: Everton

Senior career*
Years	Team	Apps	(Gls)
1960–1962	Chester	25	(0)
1962–1963	Wrexham	0	(0)
- Oswestry Town
- * Club domestic league appearances and goals

John Watson (born 2 May 1942) is a Welsh footballer who played as a full back in the Football League for Chester. He also was on the books of Wrexham and Oswestry Town.
