= Bernard Fleming =

English footballer

Personal information
- Full name: Bernard James Fleming
- Date of birth: 8 January 1937 (age 89)
- Place of birth: Middlesbrough, England
- Position: Full back

Youth career
- RAF Binbrook

Senior career*
Years	Team	Apps	(Gls)
1957–1961	Grimsby Town	22	(0)
1961–1962	Workington	19	(0)
1962–1964	Chester	64	(0)
- Winsford United
Total		105	(0)
- * Club domestic league appearances and goals

Bernard James Fleming (born 8 January 1937) is a footballer who played as a full back in the Football League for Grimsby Town, Workington and Chester.
