= Derek Hennin =

English footballer (1931–1989)

Personal information
- Full name: Derek Hennin
- Date of birth: 28 December 1931
- Place of birth: Prescot, Lancashire, England
- Date of death: January 1989 (aged 57)
- Position: Wing half

Senior career*
Years	Team	Apps	(Gls)
c.1947–1949	Prescot Cables		
1949–1961	Bolton Wanderers	164	(8)
1961–1962	Chester	54	(4)
1962–1963	Wigan Athletic	38	(1)
Total		256	(13)

International career
- England Youth
- * Club domestic league appearances and goals

Derek Hennin (28 December 1931 – 15 January 1989) was an English professional footballer who played as a wing half. He was part of the Bolton Wanderers side that won the 1958 FA Cup Final against Manchester United.

== Early life ==
Hennin was born in Prescot, Lancashire on 28 December 1931 to Harry and Maggie Hennin. He had one younger sister, Patricia (Pat). He attended Whiston Secondary Modern School from the age of eleven until fifteen, where he was Head Boy and was a keen player in the school football team. He grew up a supporter of Everton. As a youngster, Hennin played for the England Youth football team.

== Playing career ==
Hennin was born in Prescot and was a product of the St Helens Combination league, having left hometown club Prescot Cables for Bolton Wanderers in June 1949. He had to wait almost five years for his league debut against Tottenham Hotspur. He went on to make 164 league appearances for the club, with his first of his eight goals arriving against Blackpool in January 1957. The following season saw him help Bolton reach the FA Cup final, where he was selected for the 2–0 win over Manchester United.

In February 1961 Hennin joined Chester, making his debut in a 2–1 derby win at Wrexham. He was installed as captain the following season but left the club at the end of the campaign after they again finished bottom of the Football League. This marked the end of Hennin's professional career, as he joined non–league side Wigan Athletic, where he played 38 Cheshire League games during his one season at the club.

== Honours ==
Bolton Wanderers

- FA Cup: 1957–58

== Personal life ==
Hennin married Mary in June 1954. The couple had a total of three daughters: Nicola (b.1956 d.1958), Hilary (b.1959) and Lynn (b.1961).
