= John Gregson (footballer) =

English footballer (1939–2025)

Personal information
- Date of birth: 17 May 1939
- Place of birth: Skelmersdale, England
- Date of death: 27 April 2025 (aged 85)
- Position: Winger

Senior career*
Years	Team	Apps	(Gls)
19xx–1957	Skelmersdale United		
1957–1959	Blackpool	3	(1)
1962–1963	Chester	32	(5)
1963–1965	Shrewsbury Town	56	(6)
1965–1967	Mansfield Town	76	(5)
1967–1968	Lincoln City	36	(6)
1968–1971	Cambridge United	32+	(1+)
- * Club domestic league appearances and goals

John Gregson (17 May 1939 – 27 April 2025) was an English professional footballer who played as a winger for several clubs in the Football League. Having to retire through injury, a testimonial match was played between a Cambridge 11 and a full strength Ipswich Town, managed by the late Bobby Robson. Gregson died on 27 April 2025, at the age of 85.
