= Rob Evans (footballer) =

Welsh footballer

Personal information
- Date of birth: 5 June 1995 (age 31)
- Place of birth: Penycae, Wales
- Height: 5 ft 9 in (1.75 m)
- Position: Midfielder

Team information
- Current team: Brickfield Rangers

Youth career
- –2012: Wrexham

Senior career*
| Years | Team | Apps | (Gls) |
| 2012–2017 | Wrexham | 156 | (7) |
| 2017–2018 | Billericay Town | 44 | (4) |
| 2018–2019 | Warrington Town | 39 | (1) |
| 2019–2021 | Curzon Ashton | 43 | (1) |
| 2021–2022 | Alfreton Town | 33 | (1) |
| 2022–2023 | AFC Telford United | 48 | (2) |
| 2023–2026 | Newtown | 81 | (3) |
| 2026– | Brickfield Rangers | 13 | (0) |

International career^{‡}
| 2011 | Wales U17 | 3 | (0) |
| 2013–2014 | Wales U19 | 8 | (0) |

Managerial career
- 2018–: Glyndwr Wrexham Football Academy
- * Club domestic league appearances and goals as of 08:55, 8 November 2026 (UTC) ‡ National team caps and goals as of 2 June 2014

Rob Evans (born 5 June 1995) is a Welsh semi-professional footballer who plays for Brickfield Rangers in the Cymru North.

== Club career ==
=== Wrexham ===
Evans was born in Penycae, Wrexham County Borough. He made his first-team debut for Wrexham in a Conference Premier match against Newport County in April 2012. Evans became Wrexham's youngest ever captain whilst leading Wrexham to a 2–1 FA Trophy victory over Gresley in 2013 at the age of 18. He scored his first competitive goal for Wrexham against Barnet in September 2014. Following an impressive and ever present 2015–16 season, Evans won the young player of the year award for the second successive year.

Evans was released by Wrexham at the end of 2016–17.

=== Billericay Town ===
On 28 May 2017, Evans signed for Isthmian League Premier Division club Billericay Town. He made 36 games and scored 1, before he left Billericay.

=== Warrington Town ===
After two months without a club, Rob signed for Northern Premier League side Warrington Town, along former Wrexham teammate David Raven. Despite the Welshman being offered a new deal to remain at Cantilever Park, he announced in May on Twitter that his time at the club had come to an end.

=== Curzon Ashton ===
Robbie signed for Conference North side Curzon Ashton in May 2019.

=== Alfreton Town ===
In June 2021, Evans joined Alfreton Town after two seasons with Curzon Ashton.

=== AFC Telford United ===
On 10 March 2022, Evans joined National League North side AFC Telford United on a deal until the end of the 2021–22 season.

In summer 2026 he moved to Brickfield Rangers.

== Coaching career ==
On 26 July 2018 Wrexham announced the signing of Evans, as Coach at Glyndwr Wrexham Football Academy.

== Career statistics ==
As of end of 2020–21 season

Appearances and goals by club, season and competition
| Club | Season | League | | | FA Cup | | League Cup | | Other | | Total | |
| Club | Season | Division | Apps | Goals | Apps | Goals | Apps | Goals | Apps | Goals | Apps | Goals |
|---|---|---|---|---|---|---|---|---|---|---|---|---|
| Wrexham | 2011–12 | Conference Premier | 1 | 0 | 0 | 0 | — | | 0 | 0 | 1 | 0 |
| Wrexham | 2012–13 | Conference Premier | 4 | 0 | 0 | 0 | — | | 1 (Note: Appearance(s) in FA Trophy) | 0 | 5 | 0 |
| Wrexham | 2013–14 | Conference Premier | 16 | 0 | 1 | 0 | — | | 2 | 0 | 19 | 0 |
| Wrexham | 2014–15 | Conference Premier | 26 | 3 | 1 | 0 | — | | 6 | 0 | 33 | 3 |
| Wrexham | 2015–16 | National League | 44 | 3 | 1 | 0 | — | | 1 | 0 | 46 | 3 |
| Wrexham | 2016–17 | National League | 29 | 1 | 1 | 0 | — | | 1 | 0 | 31 | 1 |
| Wrexham | Total | | 120 | 7 | 4 | 0 | 0 | 0 | 11 | 0 | 135 | 7 |
| Curzon Ashton | 2019–20 | National League North | 25 | 0 | 0 | 0 | — | | 1 | 0 | 26 | 0 |
| Curzon Ashton | 2020–21 | National League North | 13 | 1 | 1 | 0 | — | | 1 | 0 | 15 | 1 |
| Curzon Ashton | Total | | 38 | 1 | 1 | 0 | 0 | 0 | 2 | 0 | 41 | 1 |
| Career total | | | 158 | 8 | 5 | 0 | 0 | 0 | 13 | 0 | 176 | 8 |
