= Jimmy Anderson (footballer, born 1932) =

Scottish footballer (1932–2019)

Personal information
- Full name: James McFarland Anderson
- Date of birth: 25 December 1932
- Place of birth: Glasgow, Scotland
- Date of death: November 2019 (aged 86)
- Position: Wing half

Youth career
- Partick Avondale

Senior career*
Years	Team	Apps	(Gls)
- RAOC Hilsea
1953–1957	Bristol Rovers	24	(0)
1957–1960	Chester	62	(0)
1960–1961	Rhyl		
1961–1963	Weymouth		
- * Club domestic league appearances and goals

James Anderson (25 December 1932 – November 2019) was a Scottish footballer who spent most of his playing career in England.

== Playing career ==
Anderson played for Partick Avondale and then Portsmouth based RAOC Hilsea after joining the army. He went on to join Bristol Rovers in 1953, making his league debut the following year in a 5–3 defeat at Liverpool.

After 24 league appearances, Anderson moved to Chester in the summer of 1957, playing regularly initially but then finding his opportunities limited after the arrivals of Bobby Hunt and Frank Clempson. After leaving Chester in 1960, Anderson played for Rhyl and Weymouth before retiring in 1963. He was later employed by Vauxhall Motors and then worked in the construction industry.
