= Théophile N'Tamé =

Cameroonian footballer

Personal information
- Full name: Théophile Junior N'Tamé N'Tamé
- Date of birth: 17 May 1985 (age 41)
- Place of birth: Ndoungue, Cameroon
- Height: 1.88 m (6 ft 2 in)
- Position: Defender

Senior career*
Years	Team	Apps	(Gls)
2003–2004	Marmande	20	(5)
2004–2006	FC Saint-Louis Neuweg	30	(6)
2006–2007	FC Alle	26	(7)
2007–2008	UR Namur	21	(1)
2008–2010	Interblock Ljubljana	38	(1)
2010–2011	Brest	3	(0)
2012–2013	Fréjus Saint-Raphaël	10	(0)
2013	Wrexham	7	(1)
2016	Mulhouse	7	(0)
Total		162	(21)
- * Club domestic league appearances and goals

Théophile Junior N'Tamé N'Tamé (born 17 May 1985) is a Cameroonian former professional footballer who played who as a defender.

== Career ==
N'Tamé started playing in France, in lower leagues clubs Marmande and FC Saint-Louis Neuweg. In 2006, he moved to Switzerland where he represented FC Alle. Next year, he moved to Belgian Second Division club Union Royale Namur. In summer 2008. he moved to Slovenia to play in Slovenian First League club Interblock Ljubljana where he played until January 2010, when he moved back to France, this time to play with Ligue 2 club Stade Brestois 29. At the end of the season Brest got promoted to Ligue 1. NTamé made his French top league debut on 18 December 2010 in a match of the 18 round against Nice, a 1–1 draw.

N'Tamé joined Wrexham on trial in early July 2013. He made his debut for Wrexham in a 1–1 draw against Blackburn Rovers in a pre-season friendly. After a successful trial period he signed a six-month contract with the club keeping him there until January 2014. He scored his first goal for the club on his home debut in a 2–2 draw with Hyde in the league. On 17 December 2013, it was announced that N'Tamé had cancelled his contract by mutual consent. He had made seven league appearances.

== Honours ==
Interblock

- Slovenian Cup: 2008–09

== External sources ==
- Théophile N'Tamé at WorldFootball.net
- Stats from Slovenia at PrvaLiga.si.
