= Tom Barrett (footballer) =

English footballer

Personal information
- Full name: George Thomas Barrett
- Date of birth: 16 March 1934
- Place of birth: Salford, England
- Date of death: 8 March 2014 (aged 79)
- Place of death: Salford, England
- Position: Defender

Youth career
- c 1950–1952: Manchester United

Senior career*
Years	Team	Apps	(Gls)
1952–1957	Manchester United	0	(0)
1957–1960	Plymouth Argyle	26	(1)
1960–1961	Chester	39	(2)
1961–?	Cheltenham Town		
- * Club domestic league appearances and goals

George Thomas Barrett (16 March 1934 – 8 March 2014) was an English footballer.

A defender, Barrett progressed through the youth ranks at Manchester United but left for Plymouth Argyle in 1957. After three years with Plymouth, Barrett moved to Chester, where he played regularly for a season before joining non-league Cheltenham Town.
