= Malcolm Edwards (footballer) =

Welsh footballer

Personal information
- Date of birth: 25 October 1939 (age 87)
- Place of birth: Wrexham, Wales
- Position: Full back

Senior career*
Years	Team	Apps	(Gls)
1956–1960	Bolton Wanderers	14	(1)
1960–1962	Chester	43	(5)
1962–1964	Tranmere Rovers	34	(2)
1964–1969	Barrow	177	(9)
- Bangor City
Total		268	(17)
- * Club domestic league appearances and goals

Malcolm Edwards (born 25 October 1939) is a footballer who played as a full back in the Football League for Bolton Wanderers, Chester, Tranmere Rovers and Barrow.
