= Barry Wright (footballer) =

Welsh footballer

Personal information
- Full name: Barry Albert Wright
- Date of birth: 23 July 1939 (age 87)
- Place of birth: Wrexham, Wales
- Position: Full back

Senior career*
Years	Team	Apps	(Gls)
1959–1962	Wrexham	11	(0)
1962–1963	Chester	1	(0)
Total		12	(0)
- * Club domestic league appearances and goals

Barry Albert Wright (born 23 July 1939) is a Welsh footballer, who played as a full back in the Football League for Wrexham and Chester.
