= Wally Bellett =

English footballer

Personal information
- Full name: Walter Ronald Bellett
- Date of birth: November 14, 1933
- Place of birth: Stratford, London, England
- Date of death: 11 November 2022 (aged 88)
- Position: Full back

Youth career
- Canvey Island
- Grays Athletic
- Arsenal

Senior career*
Years	Team	Apps	(Gls)
1954	Chelmsford City	0	(0)
1954	Barking		
1954–1958	Chelsea	35	(1)
1958–1960	Plymouth Argyle	41	(1)
1960–1961	Chelmsford City	3	(0)
1961	Leyton Orient	0	(0)
1961–1962	Chester	12	(1)
1962–1963	Wrexham	2	(0)
1963–1964	Tranmere Rovers	0	(0)
1964–1966	Gravesend & Northfleet		
1966–1974	Canvey Island		

International career
- England Youth
- * Club domestic league appearances and goals

Walter Ronald Bellett (14 November 1933 – 11 November 2022) was an English footballer who played as a full back.

== Playing career ==
Bellett spent time as a youngster with Grays Athletic, Arsenal, Chelmsford City and Barking and was called up for the England Youth side. In his early football career he was also based in Malaysia with the Royal Air Force.

He signed professional forms with Chelsea in September 1954 after impressing on trial, making his Football League First Division debut in February 1956 in a 2–2 draw with Manchester City. He will also be remembered as being in the iconic Tom Finney splash photograph with his appearance in it almost being completely obscured. After 35 league appearances for Chelsea he moved to Plymouth Argyle in December 1958, with the season ending with Bellett having helped the Pilgrims finishing as champions of the Football League Third Division. Although Bellett briefly dropped out of professional football when he returned to Chelmsford, he was to quickly be back in the Football League with fairly short spells at Leyton Orient, Chester, Wrexham and Tranmere Rovers.

In 1964 Bellett dropped back into non-League football with Gravesend & Northfleet, later going on to enjoy a long playing and coaching stint with Canvey Island. Away from football he worked as a car mechanic and lorry driver. Bellett died on 11 November 2022 at the age of 88.
