= Jim Appleby =

English footballer

Personal information
- Full name: James Park Appleby
- Date of birth: 15 June 1934
- Place of birth: Shotton Colliery, England
- Date of death: 6 January 2014 (aged 79)
- Place of death: Peterlee, County Durham, England
- Height: 6 ft 2 in (1.88 m)
- Position: Defender

Senior career*
Years	Team	Apps	(Gls)
1956–1957	Burnley	1	(0)
1957–1961	Blackburn Rovers	2	(0)
1961–1962	Southport	13	(0)
1962–1963	Chester	1	(0)
1963–1964	Horden Colliery Welfare	?	(?)
Total		17	(0)
- * Club domestic league appearances and goals

James Park Appleby (15 June 1934 – 6 January 2014) was an English professional footballer who played as a defender.

Appleby started his professional career with Burnley after playing amateur football with Wingate Welfare. He made his debut for the club on 1 May 1957 in the 0–1 home defeat to Blackpool. He then moved to local rivals Blackburn Rovers but played only two league matches for the club during a four-year spell. In 1961, Appleby joined Southport where he made 13 league appearances in one season with the team. He ended his professional career with Chester, where he played one match in the 1962–63 season before moving into non-league football. He had a spell as manager of Horden Colliery Welfare during the 1960s.

Appleby, aged 79, died on 6 January 2014. He was preceded in death by his wife Margaret and is survived by three children.
