= Harvey Jones (footballer) =

Welsh footballer

Personal information
- Date of birth: 16 August 1936 (age 90)
- Place of birth: Wrexham, Wales
- Position: Wing half

Senior career*
Years	Team	Apps	(Gls)
1958–1959	Toronto Sparta		
1959–1960	Wrexham	13	(0)
1960–1961	Chester	19	(0)
- Ellesmere Port
Total		32	(0)
- * Club domestic league appearances and goals

Harvey Jones (born 16 August 1936) was a footballer who played as a wing half in the Football League for Wrexham and Chester. In 1958, he played in the National Soccer League with Toronto Sparta for two seasons.
