= John Evans (footballer, born 1941) =

English footballer

Personal information
- Full name: John David Evans
- Date of birth: 24 March 1941 (age 85)
- Place of birth: Chester, England
- Position: Full back

Senior career*
Years	Team	Apps	(Gls)
1961–1965	Chester	40	(0)
- * Club domestic league appearances and goals

John David Evans (born 24 March 1941) is an English footballer, who played as a full back in the Football League for Chester.
