= Bobby Clarke (footballer) =

English footballer

Personal information
- Full name: Allan Robert Clarke
- Date of birth: 13 October 1941
- Place of birth: Liverpool, England
- Date of death: August 2008 (aged 66)
- Place of death: Liverpool, England
- Position: Inside forward

Youth career
- –1961: Liverpool

Senior career*
Years	Team	Apps	(Gls)
1961–1963	Chester	30	(5)
1963–	Witton Albion		
1963-1964	Macclesfield Town	10	(0)
Total		40	(5)
- * Club domestic league appearances and goals

Bobby Clarke (13 October 1941 – August 2008) was an English footballer, who played as an inside forward for Chester and Witton Albion.
