= David Cartlidge =

English footballer

Dave Cartlidge
Personal information
- Full name: David Thomas Cartlidge
- Date of birth: 9 April 1940 (age 86)
- Place of birth: Leicester, England
- Position: Wing half

Youth career
- Leicester City

Senior career*
Years	Team	Apps	(Gls)
1961–1962	Bradford City	6	(3)
1962–1963	Chester	19	(0)
Total		25	(3)
- * Club domestic league appearances and goals

Dave Cartlidge (born 9 April 1940) is an English footballer, who played as a wing half in the Football League for Chester.
