= Tony Field (footballer, born 1942) =

English footballer

Personal information
- Full name: Anthony Frederick Field
- Date of birth: 23 May 1942 (age 84)
- Place of birth: Chester, England
- Position: Forward

Youth career
- c. 1958–1960: Chester

Senior career*
Years	Team	Apps	(Gls)
1960–1962	Chester	2	(0)
1962–1963	Southport	0	(0)
- * Club domestic league appearances and goals

Anthony Frederick Field (born 23 May 1942) is an English former footballer who played as a forward.

Fields made two appearances for Chester in The Football League late in the 1960–61 season, having been a product of the club's youth system. These proved to be his only first-team outings for the club and he moved to Southport but did not add any more league appearances to his name.
