= Willie Brown (footballer, born 1938) =

Scottish footballer

Personal information
- Full name: William Inglis Brown
- Date of birth: 25 November 1938 (age 87)
- Place of birth: Clydebank, Scotland
- Position: Goalkeeper

Senior career*
Years	Team	Apps	(Gls)
- Arthurlie
1957–1959	St Mirren	0	(0)
1959–1960	Accrington Stanley	29	(0)
1960–1961	Chester City	41	(0)
1962–1962	Greenock Morton	11	(0)
Total		81	(0)
- * Club domestic league appearances and goals

William Inglis Brown (born 25 November 1938) is a Scottish retired professional footballer, who played as a goalkeeper in the English Football League. He was born in Clydebank.
