= Arthur Johnson (footballer, born 1933) =

English footballer

Personal information
- Date of birth: 23 January 1933
- Place of birth: Liverpool, England
- Date of death: 20 June 2011 (aged 78)
- Place of death: Chorley, Lancashire, England
- Height: 6 ft 1 1/2 in (1.87 m)
- Position: Goalkeeper

Youth career
- 1949–1950: Blackburn Rovers

Senior career*
Years	Team	Apps	(Gls)
1950–1955	Blackburn Rovers	1	(0)
1955–1960	Halifax Town	215	(0)
1960–1963	Wrexham	52	(0)
1962	→ Chester (loan)	3	(0)
1963	New Brighton		
1963–1964	Rhyl		
1964–19??	Holyhead Town		
- * Club domestic league appearances and goals

Arthur Johnson (23 January 1933 – 20 June 2011) was an English footballer who played as a goalkeeper.

== Playing career ==
Johnson represented Southport and District Schoolboys as a youngster and went on to join Blackburn Rovers as an apprentice in 1949 before turning professional a year later.

After one appearance in the Football League over the next five years, Johnson moved to Halifax Town and enjoyed regular football before moving to Wrexham in 1960. He spent three years with the North Wales club, although the early stages of 1962–63 were spent on loan at local rivals Chester.

Johnson was released by Wrexham in 1963, going on to play non-League football for New Brighton, Rhyl and Holyhead Town. Away from football, he worked as a cost accountant.
