= Jimmy McGill (footballer, born 1939) =

Scottish footballer

Personal information
- Full name: James Hopkins McGill
- Date of birth: 2 October 1939
- Place of birth: Bellshill, Scotland
- Date of death: October 2006 (aged 66–67)
- Place of death: Chester, England
- Position: Defender

Youth career
- Partick Thistle

Senior career*
Years	Team	Apps	(Gls)
1959–1960	Oldham Athletic	38	(2)
1960–1962	Crewe Alexandra	81	(2)
1962–1964	Chester	32	(0)
1964	Wrexham	17	(0)
1964	Macclesfield Town	1	(0)
Total		169	(4)
- * Club domestic league appearances and goals

Jimmy McGill (2 October 1939 – October 2006) was a Scottish footballer, who played as a defender in the Football League for Oldham Athletic, Crewe Alexandra, Chester and Wrexham. He played more than 360 football games in his professional career.
