= Alan Pritchard =

English footballer

Personal information
- Full name: Alan Stewart Pritchard
- Date of birth: 24 August 1943 (age 83)
- Place of birth: Chester, England
- Position: Inside forward

Senior career*
Years	Team	Apps	(Gls)
1960–1964	Chester City	19	(6)
- * Club domestic league appearances and goals

Alan Stewart Pritchard (born 24 August 1943) is an English footballer who played as an inside forward in the Football League for Chester City.
