= Eric Raybould =

English footballer (born 1940)

Personal information
- Date of birth: 8 December 1940 (age 85)
- Place of birth: Manchester, England
- Position: Wing half

Senior career*
Years	Team	Apps	(Gls)
1960–1962	Chester	10	(0)
- * Club domestic league appearances and goals

Eric Raybould (born 8 December 1940) is an English footballer who played as a wing half in the Football League for Chester.
