= John Hardie (footballer) =

Scottish footballer

Personal information
- Full name: John Clarke Hardie
- Date of birth: 7 February 1938 (age 88)
- Place of birth: Edinburgh, Scotland
- Position: Goalkeeper

Youth career
- Penicuik Athletic
- 1958–1959: Hibernian

Senior career*
Years	Team	Apps	(Gls)
1959–1960	Falkirk	1	(0)
1960–1961	Oldham Athletic	17	(0)
1961–1963	Chester	84	(0)
1963–1970	Bradford Park Avenue	265	(0)
1970–1971	Crystal Palace	0	(0)
- Gainsborough Trinity
Total		367	(0)
- * Club domestic league appearances and goals

John Clarke Hardie (born 7 February 1938) is a Scottish footballer, who played as a goalkeeper in the Football League for Oldham Athletic, Chester and Bradford Park Avenue.
