= 1957–58 FA Cup =

Tournament details
- Country: England; Wales

Final positions
- Champions: Bolton Wanderers (4th title)
- Runners-up: Manchester United

The 1957–58 FA Cup was the 77th staging of the world's oldest football cup competition, the Football Association Challenge Cup, commonly known as the FA Cup. Bolton Wanderers won the competition for the fourth time, beating Manchester United 2–0 in the final at Wembley. The competition is notable for the exploits of Manchester United following the loss of much of their team in the Munich air disaster on 6 February 1958. They came through three rounds following the accident, before being beaten by Bolton in the final.

Matches were scheduled to be played at the stadium of the team named first on the date specified for each round, which was always a Saturday. Some matches, however, might be rescheduled for other days if there were clashes with games for other competitions or the weather was inclement. If scores were level after 90 minutes had been played, a replay would take place at the stadium of the second-named team later the same week. If the replayed match was drawn further replays would be held until a winner was determined. If scores were level after 90 minutes had been played in a replay, a 30-minute period of extra time would be played.

== Calendar ==
Round	Date
Preliminary round	Saturday 7 September 1957
First qualifying round	Saturday 21 September 1957
Second qualifying round	Saturday 5 October 1957
Third qualifying round	Saturday 19 October 1957
Fourth qualifying round	Saturday 2 November 1957
First round proper	Saturday 16 November 1957
Second round	Saturday 7 December 1957
Third round	Saturday 4 January 1958
Fourth round	Saturday 25 January 1958
Fifth round	Saturday 15 February 1958
Sixth round	Saturday 1 March 1958
Semi finals	Saturday 22 March 1958
Final	Saturday 3 May 1958

== Qualifying rounds ==
Most participating clubs that were not members of the Football League competed in the qualifying rounds to secure one of 30 places available in the first round.

The winners from the fourth qualifying round were South Shields, Crook Town, Durham City, Billingham Synthonia, Scarborough, Rhyl, Prescot Cables, Wigan Athletic, Oswestry Town, Hereford United, Worcester City, Boston United, Witton Albion, Goole Town, Frickley Colliery, Spalding United, Peterborough United, Wisbech Town, Gorleston, Clapton, Guildford City, Walthamstow Avenue, Margate, Redhill, Walton & Hersham, Newport (IOW), Trowbridge Town, Bath City, Dorchester Town and Yeovil Town.

Those appearing in the competition proper for the first time were Prescot Cables, Spalding United, Redhill and Walton & Hersham. Of the others, Clapton and Oswestry Town had last featured at this stage in 1926-27, Frickley Colliery in 1936–37, Wisbech Town in 1945-46 and Trowbridge Town in 1947-48.

Wisbech Town also participated in seven rounds of this season's tournament, progressing from the preliminary round to the second round proper. They defeated Newmarket Town, Chatteris Town, King's Lynn, March Town United, Hounslow Town and Colchester United before going out to Reading at Elm Park.

== First round proper ==
At this stage the 48 clubs from the Football League Third Division North and South joined the 30 non-league clubs who came through the qualifying rounds. To complete this round, Bishop Auckland and Wycombe Wanderers were given byes as the champions and runners-up from the previous season's FA Amateur Cup.

Matches were scheduled to be played on Saturday, 16 November 1957. Five were drawn and went to replays, with one of these going to a second replay.

Tie no	Home team	Score	Away team	Date
1	Chester	4–3	Gateshead	16 November 1957
2	Clapton	1–1	Queens Park Rangers	16 November 1957
Replay	Queens Park Rangers	3–1	Clapton	18 November 1957
3	Bath City	2–1	Exeter City	16 November 1957
4	Dorchester Town	3–2	Wycombe Wanderers	16 November 1957
5	Rochdale	0–2	Darlington	16 November 1957
6	Reading	1–0	Swindon Town	16 November 1957
7	Wisbech Town	1–0	Colchester United	16 November 1957
8	Gillingham	10–1	Gorleston	16 November 1957
9	Wrexham	0–1	Accrington Stanley	16 November 1957
10	Bishop Auckland	0–0	Bury	16 November 1957
Replay	Bury	4–1	Bishop Auckland	19 November 1957
11	Tranmere Rovers	2–1	Witton Albion	16 November 1957
12	Stockport County	2–1	Barrow	16 November 1957
13	Trowbridge Town	0–2	Southend United	16 November 1957
14	Northampton Town	3–0	Newport County	16 November 1957
15	Coventry City	1–0	Walthamstow Avenue	16 November 1957
16	Brighton & Hove Albion	2–1	Walsall	16 November 1957
17	Norwich City	6–1	Redhill	16 November 1957
18	Plymouth Argyle	6–2	Watford	16 November 1957
19	Bradford City	6–0	Scarborough	16 November 1957
20	Millwall	1–0	Brentford	16 November 1957
21	Hull City	2–1	Crewe Alexandra	16 November 1957
22	Carlisle United	5–1	Rhyl	16 November 1957
23	Oldham Athletic	2–0	Bradford Park Avenue	16 November 1957
24	Hartlepools United	5–0	Prescot Cables	16 November 1957
25	Scunthorpe & Lindsey United	2–1	Goole Town	16 November 1957
26	Mansfield Town	2–0	Halifax Town	16 November 1957
27	Port Vale	2–1	Shrewsbury Town	16 November 1957
28	Margate	2–3	Crystal Palace	16 November 1957
29	Durham City	3–1	Spalding United	16 November 1957
30	Southport	1–2	Wigan Athletic	16 November 1957
31	Oswestry Town	1–5	Bournemouth & Boscombe Athletic	16 November 1957
32	Workington	8–1	Crook Town	16 November 1957
33	York City	1–0	Chesterfield	16 November 1957
34	Aldershot	0–0	Worcester City	16 November 1957
Replay	Worcester City	2–2	Aldershot	21 November 1957
Replay	Aldershot	3–2	Worcester City	25 November 1957
35	Guildford City	2–2	Yeovil Town	16 November 1957
Replay	Yeovil Town	1–0	Guildford City	21 November 1957
36	Newport (IOW)	0–3	Hereford United	16 November 1957
37	Boston United	5–2	Billingham Synthonia	16 November 1957
38	Peterborough United	3–3	Torquay United	16 November 1957
Replay	Torquay United	1–0	Peterborough United	20 November 1957
39	South Shields	3–2	Frickley Colliery	16 November 1957
40	Walton & Hersham	1–6	Southampton	16 November 1957

== Second round proper ==
The matches were scheduled for Saturday, 7 December 1957. Seven matches were drawn, with replays taking place later the same week.

Tie no	Home team	Score	Away team	Date
1	Chester	3–3	Bradford City	7 December 1957
Replay	Bradford City	3–1	Chester	11 December 1957
2	Darlington	5–3	Boston United	7 December 1957
3	Yeovil Town	2–0	Bath City	7 December 1957
4	Reading	2–1	Wisbech Town	7 December 1957
5	Stockport County	2–1	Hartlepools United	7 December 1957
6	Northampton Town	4–1	Bournemouth & Boscombe Athletic	7 December 1957
7	Norwich City	1–1	Brighton & Hove Albion	7 December 1957
Replay	Brighton & Hove Albion	1–2	Norwich City	11 December 1957
8	Plymouth Argyle	5–2	Dorchester Town	7 December 1957
9	Millwall	1–1	Gillingham	7 December 1957
Replay	Gillingham	6–1	Millwall	11 December 1957
10	Carlisle United	1–1	Accrington Stanley	7 December 1957
Replay	Accrington Stanley	3–2	Carlisle United	11 December 1957
11	Oldham Athletic	1–5	Workington	7 December 1957
12	Crystal Palace	1–0	Southampton	7 December 1957
13	Scunthorpe & Lindsey United	2–0	Bury	7 December 1957
14	Port Vale	2–2	Hull City	7 December 1957
Replay	Hull City	4–3	Port Vale	9 December 1957
15	Durham City	0–3	Tranmere Rovers	7 December 1957
16	Torquay United	1–1	Southend United	7 December 1957
Replay	Southend United	2–1	Torquay United	11 December 1957
17	Hereford United	6–1	Queens Park Rangers	7 December 1957
18	Aldershot	4–1	Coventry City	7 December 1957
19	Wigan Athletic	1–1	Mansfield Town	7 December 1957
Replay	Mansfield Town	3–1	Wigan Athletic	11 December 1957
20	South Shields	1–3	York City	7 December 1957

== Third round proper ==
The 44 First and Second Division clubs entered the competition at this stage. The matches were scheduled for Saturday, 4 January 1958, although the York City–Birmingham City match was postponed until the following midweek fixture. Six matches were drawn and went to replays, with one of these requiring a second replay.

Leeds United and Cardiff City were meeting in this round at Elland Road for the third consecutive year, with the Welsh club winning each of the matches by the same 2–1 scoreline. Hereford United and Yeovil Town were the last non-League sides left in the competition.

Tie no	Home team	Score	Away team	Date	Attendance
1	Burnley	4–2	Swansea Town	4 January 1958	
2	Liverpool	1–1	Southend United	4 January 1958	43,454
Replay	Southend United	2–3	Liverpool	8 January 1958	20,000
3	Preston North End	0–3	Bolton Wanderers	4 January 1958	32,641
4	Notts County	2–0	Tranmere Rovers	4 January 1958	
5	Nottingham Forest	2–0	Gillingham	4 January 1958	
6	Middlesbrough	5–0	Derby County	4 January 1958	
7	West Bromwich Albion	5–1	Manchester City	4 January 1958	49,669
8	Sunderland	2–2	Everton	4 January 1958	
Replay	Everton	3–1	Sunderland	8 January 1958	
9	Lincoln City	0–1	Wolverhampton Wanderers	4 January 1958	
10	Doncaster Rovers	0–2	Chelsea	4 January 1958	
11	Sheffield United	5–1	Grimsby Town	4 January 1958	
12	Stockport County	3–0	Luton Town	4 January 1958	
13	Tottenham Hotspur	4–0	Leicester City	4 January 1958	
14	Fulham	4–0	Yeovil Town	4 January 1958	
15	Accrington Stanley	2–2	Bristol City	4 January 1958	
Replay	Bristol City	3–1	Accrington Stanley	7 January 1958	
16	Bristol Rovers	5–0	Mansfield Town	4 January 1958	
17	Northampton Town	3–1	Arsenal	4 January 1958	
18	Portsmouth	5–1	Aldershot	4 January 1958	
19	West Ham United	5–1	Blackpool	4 January 1958	
20	Norwich City	1–2	Darlington	4 January 1958	
21	Plymouth Argyle	1–6	Newcastle United	4 January 1958	
22	Hull City	1–1	Barnsley	4 January 1958	
Replay	Barnsley	0–2	Hull City	8 January 1958	
23	Crystal Palace	0–1	Ipswich Town	4 January 1958	
24	Scunthorpe & Lindsey United	1–0	Bradford City	4 January 1958	
25	Huddersfield Town	2–2	Charlton Athletic	4 January 1958	
Replay	Charlton Athletic	1–0	Huddersfield Town	8 January 1958	
26	Leeds United	1–2	Cardiff City	4 January 1958	
27	Workington	1–3	Manchester United	4 January 1958	21,000
28	York City	3–0	Birmingham City	8 January 1958	
29	Hereford United	0–3	Sheffield Wednesday	4 January 1958	
30	Stoke City	1–1	Aston Villa	4 January 1958	45,800
Replay	Aston Villa	3–3	Stoke City	8 January 1958	38,939
Replay	Stoke City	2–0	Aston Villa	13 January 1958	
31	Rotherham United	1–4	Blackburn Rovers	4 January 1958	
32	Leyton Orient	1–0	Reading	4 January 1958	

== Fourth round proper ==
The matches were scheduled for Saturday, 25 January 1958, with two matches taking place on later dates. Five matches were drawn and went to replays, which were all played in the following midweek match.

Tie no	Home team	Score	Away team	Date	
1	Liverpool	3–1	Northampton Town	25 January 1958	56,939
2	Notts County	1–2	Bristol City	25 January 1958	
3	Sheffield Wednesday	4–3	Hull City	29 January 1958	
4	Wolverhampton Wanderers	5–1	Portsmouth	25 January 1958	43,952
5	West Bromwich Albion	3–3	Nottingham Forest	25 January 1958	58,163
Replay	Nottingham Forest	1–5	West Bromwich Albion	29 January 1958	46,477
6	Everton	1–2	Blackburn Rovers	29 January 1958	
7	Newcastle United	1–3	Scunthorpe & Lindsey United	25 January 1958	
8	Tottenham Hotspur	0–3	Sheffield United	25 January 1958	
9	Fulham	1–1	Charlton Athletic	25 January 1958	
Replay	Charlton Athletic	0–2	Fulham	29 January 1958	
10	Bristol Rovers	2–2	Burnley	25 January 1958	
Replay	Burnley	2–3	Bristol Rovers	28 January 1958	
11	West Ham United	3–2	Stockport County	25 January 1958	
12	Manchester United	2–0	Ipswich Town	25 January 1958	53,550
13	Chelsea	3–3	Darlington	25 January 1958	
Replay	Darlington	4–1	Chelsea	29 January 1958	
14	Cardiff City	4–1	Leyton Orient	25 January 1958	
15	York City	0–0	Bolton Wanderers	25 January 1958	23,460
Replay	Bolton Wanderers	3–0	York City	29 January 1958	35,194
16	Stoke City	3–1	Middlesbrough	25 January 1958	43,756

== Fifth round proper ==
The matches were scheduled for Saturday, 15 February 1958. Two matches went to replays in the following mid-week. This round is notable as containing Manchester United's first game following the Munich air disaster on 6 February 1958, and, with United struggling to put a team together to play, this match was postponed by four days. In a highly emotional game for both the players and the fans, United beat Sheffield Wednesday 3–0 to go through to the next round.

Tie no	Home team	Score	Away team	Date	
1	Bristol City	3–4	Bristol Rovers	15 February 1958	40,000
2	Bolton Wanderers	3–1	Stoke City	15 February 1958	56,667
3	Wolverhampton Wanderers	6–1	Darlington	15 February 1958	55,778
4	Sheffield United	1–1	West Bromwich Albion	15 February 1958	55,847
Replay	West Bromwich Albion	4–1	Sheffield United	19 February 1958	57,503
5	West Ham United	2–3	Fulham	15 February 1958	
6	Manchester United	3–0	Sheffield Wednesday	19 February 1958	59,848
7	Scunthorpe & Lindsey United	0–1	Liverpool	15 February 1958	23,000
8	Cardiff City	0–0	Blackburn Rovers	15 February 1958	
Replay	Blackburn Rovers	2–1	Cardiff City	20 February 1958	

== Sixth round proper ==
The four quarter-final ties were scheduled to be played on Saturday, 1 March 1958. The West Bromwich Albion–Manchester United game went to a replay before United went through.

Tie no	Home team	Score	Away team	Date	
1	Blackburn Rovers	2–1	Liverpool	1 March 1958	51,000
2	Bolton Wanderers	2–1	Wolverhampton Wanderers	1 March 1958	56,283
3	West Bromwich Albion	2–2	Manchester United	1 March 1958	58,574
Replay	Manchester United	1–0	West Bromwich Albion	5 March 1958	66,000
4	Fulham	3–1	Bristol Rovers	1 March 1958	

== Semi-finals ==
The semi-final matches were played on Saturday, 22 March 1958, with the Manchester United–Fulham match replaying on the 26th. Bolton Wanderers and Manchester United won their ties to meet in the final at Wembley.

22 March 1958
15:00

Bolton Wanderers	2–1	Blackburn Rovers

Maine Road, Manchester
Attendance: 74,800

22 March 1958
15:00

Manchester United	2–2	Fulham

Villa Park, Birmingham
Attendance: 69,752

Replay

26 March 1958
19:45

Fulham	3–5	Manchester United

Highbury, London
Attendance: 38,000

== Final ==
The FA Cup final took place on 3 May 1958 at Wembley Stadium and was won by Bolton Wanderers, beating Manchester United 2–0. United had been devastated by the Munich air disaster, but still won through three rounds of the cup following the incident, before meeting Bolton in the final.

3 May 1958

Bolton Wanderers	2–0	Manchester United
Lofthouse 3', 55'	Report

Wembley, London
Attendance: 99,756
Referee: J. Sherlock

Bolton Wanderers	Manchester United
