= 2005–06 Wrexham F.C. season =

Welsh football club season

Wrexham
2005–06 season
- Football League Two: 13th
- FA Cup: First round
- League Cup: First round
- League Trophy: First round
Home colours

The 2005–06 season saw Wrexham compete in Football League Two after being relegated in the previous season due to a 10-point deduction. They finished in 13th position with 59 points.

== Final league table ==
Pos	Team	Pld	W	D	L	GF	GA	GD	Pts
11	Boston United	46	15	16	15	50	60	−10	61
12	Bristol Rovers	46	17	9	20	59	67	−8	60
13	Wrexham	46	15	14	17	61	54	+7	59
14	Rochdale	46	14	14	18	66	69	−3	56
15	Chester City	46	14	12	20	53	59	−6	54

Rules for classification: In the Football League goals scored (GF) takes precedence over goal difference (GD).

== Results ==
Wrexham's score comes first

=== Legend ===
Win	Draw	Loss

=== Football League Two ===
Match	Date	Opponent	Venue	Result	Attendance	Scorers
1	6 August 2005	Boston United	H	2–0	4,503	Jones, Roche
2	9 August 2005	Notts County	A	0–1	4,382	
3	13 August 2005	Northampton Town	A	0–0	5,072	
4	20 August 2005	Carlisle United	H	0–1	4,239	
5	27 August 2005	Bury	A	2–2	2,468	McEvilly, Foy
6	29 August 2005	Barnet	H	3–1	3,768	Jones, Foy, Warhurst
7	10 September 2005	Cheltenham Town	H	2–0	3,671	Holt, Walters
8	13 September 2005	Lincoln City	A	0–2	2,959	
9	17 September 2005	Leyton Orient	A	1–1	3,733	Ferguson
10	24 September 2005	Macclesfield Town	H	1–1	3,830	D. Williams
11	27 September 2005	Wycombe Wanderers	A	1–4	4,166	Jones
12	1 October 2005	Stockport County	H	3–0	4,153	Walters, Jones (2)
13	15 October 2005	Torquay United	H	4–2	4,301	Walters (2), Bennett, Spender
14	22 October 2005	Bristol Rovers	A	1–2	5,730	Lawrence
15	25 October 2005	Peterborough United	A	1–1	4,014	Holt
16	29 October 2005	Darlington	H	1–0	4,881	McEvilly
17	12 November 2005	Oxford United	A	3–0	4,491	McEvilly (2), Jones
18	19 November 2005	Peterborough United	H	1–1	4,480	Burton (o.g.)
19	26 November 2005	Boston United	A	1–2	1,938	McEvilly
20	6 December 2005	Mansfield Town	H	4–1	3,421	McEvilly, Jones, Walters, D. Williams
21	10 December 2005	Notts County	H	1–1	4,726	Foy
22	17 December 2005	Carlisle United	A	1–2	6,213	Crowell
23	26 December 2005	Rochdale	H	2–1	5,127	Crowell, Ferguson
24	31 December 2005	Grimsby Town	H	1–2	4,527	Jones
25	3 January 2006	Shrewsbury Town	A	0–1	6,249	
26	7 January 2006	Luton Town	H	1–1	3,809	Jones
27	14 January 2006	Rushden & Diamonds	A	2–0	2,617	Jones (2)
28	21 January 2006	Leyton Orient	H	1–2	5,031	Bennett
29	4 February 2006	Wycombe Wanderers	H	2–0	4,311	Lawrence, S. Williams
30	14 February 2006	Rushden & Diamonds	H	2–0	3,195	Derbyshire (2)
31	18 February 2006	Mansfield Town	A	2–2	3,139	Derbyshire (2)
32	25 February 2006	Northampton Town	H	0–1	5,012	
33	4 March 2006	Barnet	A	2–2	2,127	Derbyshire, Jones
34	11 March 2006	Bury	H	0–0	4,134	
35	14 March 2006	Macclesfield Town	A	2–3	1,616	S. Williams, Holt
36	18 March 2006	Rochdale	A	1–0	2,856	Derbyshire
37	21 March 2006	Cheltenham Town	A	2–2	2,737	Derbyshire (2)
38	26 March 2006	Chester City	H	2–1	7,240	D. Williams, Jones
39	1 April 2006	Grimsby Town	A	0–2	6,058	
40	9 April 2006	Shrewsbury Town	H	1–2	6,310	Derbyshire
41	12 April 2006	Chester City	A	1–2	4,801	McEvilly
42	15 April 2006	Stockport County	A	1–2	4,750	Spender
43	17 April 2006	Bristol Rovers	H	1–0	3,749	Derbyshire
44	22 April 2006	Torquay United	A	0–1	2,363	
45	29 April 2006	Oxford United	H	1–1	2,636	Crowell
46	6 May 2006	Darlington	H	1–1	4,648	D. Williams

=== FA Cup ===
Match	Date	Opponent	Venue	Result	Attendance	Scorers
R1	4 November 2005	Port Vale	A	1–2	5,049	McEvilly

=== Football League Cup ===
Match	Date	Opponent	Venue	Result	Attendance	Scorers
R1	23 August 2005	Doncaster Rovers	H	0–1	2,177	

=== Football League Trophy ===
Match	Date	Opponent	Venue	Result	Attendance	Scorers
R1	18 October 2005	Blackpool	A	3–4	3,239	Jones (2), Ferguson

== Squad statistics ==
No.	Pos.	Name	League		FA Cup		League Cup		Other		Total	
No.	Pos.	Name	Apps	Goals	Apps	Goals	Apps	Goals	Apps	Goals	Apps	Goals
1	GK	(Northern Ireland) Michael Ingham	40	0	1	0	1	0	1	0	43	0
2	DF	(Northern Ireland) Jim Whitley	10	0	0	0	0	0	0	0	10	0
3	DF	(England) Alex Smith	15(5)	0	1	0	1	0	1	0	18(5)	0
4	DF	(England) David Bayliss	21(1)	0	1	0	1	0	1	0	24(1)	0
5	DF	(England) Paul Warhurst	6(5)	1	0	0	0(1)	0	0	0	6(6)	1
6	DF	(Trinidad and Tobago) Dennis Lawrence	38(1)	2	1	0	0	0	1	0	40(1)	2
7	DF	(England) Andy Holt	35(1)	3	0	0	1	0	1	0	37(1)	3
8	MF	(Wales) Danny Williams	45	4	1	0	1	0	1	0	48	4
9	FW	(Republic of Ireland) Jonathan Walters	33(5)	5	1	0	1	0	1	0	36(5)	5
10	MF	(Scotland) Darren Ferguson	36(3)	2	1	0	1	0	1	1	39(3)	3
11	FW	(England) Lee McEvilly	15(8)	7	1	1	0	0	0(1)	0	16(9)	7
12	MF	(England) Dean Bennett	20(13)	2	0(1)	0	1	0	1	0	22(14)	2
13	GK	(England) Michael Jones	6(1)	0	0	0	0	0	0	0	6(1)	0
14	FW	(England) Matt Derbyshire	16	10	0	0	0	0	0	0	16	10
14	FW	(Scotland) Robbie Foy	7(10)	3	0(1)	0	1	0	0(1)	0	8(12)	3
15	DF	(England) Lee Roche	17	1	0	0	0	0	0	0	17	1
16	MF	(Wales) Matt Crowell	26(3)	3	0	0	0	0	0	0	26(3)	3
17	MF	(Wales) Mark Jones	42	13	1	0	1	0	1	0	45	13
18	DF	(Wales) Shaun Pejic	26	0	0	0	1	0	0	0	27	0
19	MF	(Wales) Levi Mackin	3(14)	0	0	0	0(1)	0	0(1)	0	3(16)	0
20	DF	(Wales) Simon Spender	15(4)	2	1	0	0	0	1	0	17(4)	2
21	FW	(Wales) Marc Williams	2(2)	0	0	0	0	0	0	0	2(2)	0
21	DF	(England) Paul Linwood	8(1)	0	0	0	0	0	0	0	8(1)	0
22	FW	(England) Matt Done	1(5)	0	0	0	0(1)	0	0	0	1(6)	0
25	DF	(Wales) Mike Williams	7(5)	0	0	0	0	0	0	0	7(5)	0
27	DF	(England) Sam Williams	14(1)	2	0	0	0	0	0	0	14(1)	2
27	FW	(England) Jamie Reed	0(3)	0	0	0	0	0	0	0	0(3)	0
30	FW	(Spain) Juan Ugarte	2	0	0	0	0	0	0	0	2	0
