= 2005 Football League Trophy final =

- Event: 2004–05 Football League Trophy
Southend United	Wrexham
(England)	(Wales)
0	2
- Date: 10 April 2005
- Venue: Millennium Stadium, Cardiff
- Referee: Brian Curson (Leicestershire)
- Attendance: 36,216

The 2005 Football League Trophy final was the 22nd final of the domestic football cup competition for teams from Football Leagues One, Two and the Conference, the Football League Trophy. The final was played at Millennium Stadium in Cardiff on 10 April 2005. The match was contested between Southend United and Wrexham. Wrexham won the match 2–0 with goals from Juan Ugarte and Darren Ferguson.

== Match details ==
10 April 2005
14:05 BST

Southend United (England)	0–2 (a.e.t.)	(Wales) Wrexham
	Report	Ugarte 99'; Ferguson 118'

Millennium Stadium, Cardiff
Attendance: 36,216
Referee: Brian Curson (Leicestershire)

Southend United	Wrexham

GK	13	(England) Darryl Flahavan
RB	2	(Scotland) Duncan Jupp (yellow card)
CB	6	(England) Adam Barrett
CB	15	(England) Spencer Prior
LB	18	(England) Che Wilson
RM	9	(England) Mark Bentley (yellow card)
CM	7	(England) Mark Gower	(substituted off) 81'
CM	8	(Republic of Ireland) Kevin Maher (yellow card)
LM	10	(England) Carl Pettefer	(substituted off) 109'
CF	14	(England) Wayne Gray
CF	23	(England) Freddy Eastwood	(substituted off) 103'
Substitutes:
GK	24	(England) Craig Holloway
DF	5	(England) Andy Edwards
MF	28	(Republic of Ireland) Alan McCormack	(substituted on) 81'
MF	29	(England) Luke Guttridge	(substituted on) 109'
FW	11	(England) Lawrie Dudfield	(substituted on) 103'
Manager:
(England) Steve Tilson

GK	33	(England) Ben Foster
CB	4	(Wales) Stephen Roberts	(substituted off) 14'
CB	6	(Trinidad and Tobago) Dennis Lawrence
CB	15	(Wales) Craig Morgan (yellow card)
RM	7	(Trinidad and Tobago) Carlos Edwards (yellow card)
CM	10	(Scotland) Darren Ferguson (yellow card)
CM	11	(Wales) Chris Llewellyn
CM	16	(Wales) Matt Crowell	(substituted off) 105'
LM	19	(England) Andy Holt
AM	17	(Wales) Mark Jones	(substituted off) 100'
CF	30	(Spain) Juan Ugarte
Substitutes:
GK	35	(England) Ryan Harrison
DF	18	(Wales) Shaun Pejic	(substituted on) 14'
MF	8	(Wales) Danny Williams	(substituted on) 100'
MF	12	(England) Dean Bennett	(substituted on) 105'
FW	23	(Trinidad and Tobago) Hector Sam
Manager:
(England) Denis Smith

MATCH RULES

- 90 minutes.
- Penalty shoot-out if scores still level.
- Five named substitutes
- Maximum of 3 substitutions.
