= Michael Jones =

Michael or Mike Jones may refer to:

== Entertainment ==
=== Film and TV ===
- Michael Jones (actor) (born 1987), American voice actor
- Michael Jones (film director) (1944–2018), Canadian screenwriter
- Mike Jones (producer), Australian film producer, co-producer of A Sunburnt Christmas
- Mike Jones (screenwriter) (born 1971), American screenwriter and journalist

=== Music ===
- Michael Jones (1959–2016), birth name of American musician Kashif
- Michael Jones (born 1980), birth name of American rapper Wax
- Michael Jones (Canadian musician) (1942–2022), new-age pianist
- Michael Jones (Welsh-French musician) (born 1952)
- Mike Jones (jazz musician) (born 1962), performs with Penn and Teller
- Mike Jones (rapper) (born 1981), American rapper

=== Others in entertainment ===
- Michael Spencer Jones (born 1961), British art photographer and music video director

== Sports ==
=== American football ===
- Mike Jones (linebacker, born 1954), American football player
- Mike Jones (wide receiver, born 1960), American football player
- Mike Jones (tight end) (born 1966), American football tight end
- Mike Jones (defensive lineman) (born 1969), American football player
- Mike Jones (linebacker, born 1969), American football player most famous for the tackle that secured a win for the St. Louis Rams in Super Bowl XXXIV
- Mike Jones (offensive lineman) (born 1985), American football player
- Mike Jones (wide receiver, born 1992), Canadian football wide receiver
- Mike Jones (defensive back) (born 1995), Canadian football defensive back
- Mac Jones (Michael McCorkle Jones, born 1998), American football quarterback

=== Association football ===
- Mike Jones (referee) (born 1968), English football referee
- Mike Jones (footballer) (born 1987), English footballer
- Michael Jones (English footballer) (born 1987), English footballer
- Michael Jones (New Zealand footballer)
- Mike Jones (soccer) (born 1988), American soccer player

=== Baseball ===
- Mike Jones (1890s pitcher) (1865–1894), Canadian baseball pitcher
- Mike Jones (1980s pitcher) (born 1959), American baseball pitcher

=== Basketball ===
- Mike Jones (basketball, born 1956), American basketball player, formerly for the Illawarra Hawks in Australia
- Mike Jones (basketball, born 1965), American basketball head coach at UNC Greensboro
- Mike Jones (basketball, born 1967), American basketball player, formerly for Auburn University
- Mike Jones (basketball, born 1973), American basketball head coach at Old Dominion University
- Mike Jones (basketball, born 1984), American basketball player, formerly for the University of Maryland

=== Other sports ===
- Mike Jones (canoeist) (c 1950-1978), English expedition canoeist
- Mike Jones (athletic director) (born 1954), athletic director and men's basketball head coach
- Virgil (wrestler) (1962–2024), professional wrestler with his birth name Mike Jones
- Mick Jones (hammer thrower) (born 1963), English hammer thrower
- Michael Jones (rugby union) (born 1965), New Zealand rugby union player
- Mike Jones (motocross rider) (born 1966), American freestyle motocross rider also known as "Mad Mike Jones"
- Michael Jones (boxer) (born 1974), English boxer of the 1990s and 2000s
- Mike Jones (boxer) (born 1983), American boxer of the 2000s and 2010s
- Michael Jones (swimmer) (born 1994), British Paralympic swimmer
- Mike Jones (motorcyclist) (born 1994), Australian motorcycle racer
- Michael Jones (cricketer) (born 1998), Scottish cricketer

== Politics ==
- Michael Jones (activist) (born 1964), American psychology writer and practitioner
- Michael Jones (Virginia politician), member of the Virginia House of Delegates
- Mike Jones (Alabama politician) (born 1966), member of the Alabama House of Representatives
- Mike Jones (Iowa politician), member of the Iowa House of Representatives
- Mike Jones (Missouri politician), member of the Missouri House of Representatives
- Mike Jones (Pennsylvania politician) (born c. 1969), American politician from Pennsylvania

== Other people ==
- Michael Jones (soldier) (died 1649), colonel during the Irish Confederate War
- Michael D. Jones (1822–1898), founder of the Welsh settlement in Patagonia
- Michael Rotohiko Jones (1895–1978), New Zealand interpreter and broadcaster
- Michael Jones (historian) (born 1940), British historian
- Mike Jones (painter) (1941–2022), Welsh artist
- Michael Jones, Lord Jones (1948–2016), Scottish judge
- Mike Jones (personal trainer) (born 1957), alleged to have had an affair with evangelical preacher Ted Arthur Haggard
- Michael Jones (scientist), computer vision researcher
- Michael Jones (entrepreneur) (born 1975), American entrepreneur and investor
- Michael Gresford Jones (1901–1982), Church of England bishop
- Michael Brandon Jones, American geophysicist
- Michael Owen Jones (born 1942), American folklorist
- Michael Jones (priest) (died 1719), Anglican priest in Ireland
- Mike Jones, pseudonym of Sywald Skeid (born 1971)

== Fictional characters ==
- Mike Jones, a character in the film Babel
- Mike Jones, the protagonist of the 1990 Nintendo game StarTropics

== See also ==
- Mick Jones (disambiguation)
- Who Is Mike Jones?, a 2005 album by the rapper Mike Jones
