= Levi Mackin =

Association football player

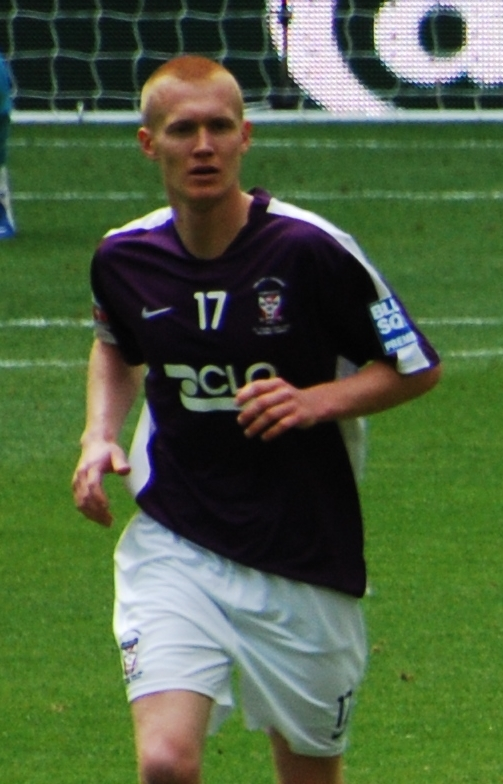
- Mackin playing for York City in the 2009 FA Trophy Final

Personal information
- Full name: Levi Alan Mackin
- Date of birth: 4 April 1986 (age 40)
- Place of birth: Chester, England
- Height: 6 ft 0 in (1.83 m)
- Position: Midfielder

Youth career
- Chester City
- –2003: Wrexham

Senior career*
Years	Team	Apps	(Gls)
2003–2009	Wrexham	61	(2)
2008	→ Droylsden (loan)	12	(1)
2009	→ York City (loan)	15	(0)
2009–2011	York City	46	(2)
2011–2012	Alfreton Town	11	(1)
2012–2013	Chester	16	(1)
2013	Bangor City	8	(1)
2013–2014	Conwy Borough	7	(0)
2014–2016	Rhyl	51	(2)
2016–2018	Flint Town United	23	(3)
2018–2022	Blacon Youth Club	21	(3)
Total		271	(16)

International career
- Wales U17
2006	Wales U21	1	(0)
- * Club domestic league appearances and goals

Levi Alan Mackin (born 4 April 1986) is a former professional footballer who played as a midfielder. He has played in the Football League for Wrexham.

Mackin started his career with Wrexham in their youth system, before making his first-team debut on the last day of the 2003–04 season. He made 11 appearances the following season and he signed his first professional contract in 2005. He established himself in the team in 2005–06, having made 19 appearances. However, next season, appearances became rarer and in 2008 he was loaned to Conference Premier club Droylsden. After being recalled by Wrexham, he scored in their final match in the Football League before relegation to the Conference Premier. He joined York City on loan in 2009 and played for them in the 2009 FA Trophy Final at Wembley Stadium. After being released by Wrexham he signed for York permanently and played in the 2010 Conference Premier play-off final at Wembley Stadium. He was released by York in 2011 before having spells with Alfreton Town, Chester, Bangor City, Conwy Borough and Rhyl.

Mackin represented Wales at international level. He was on the substitutes' bench twice for the under-17 team, before making an appearance in 2002. He received call ups to the under-19 team but did not make any appearances. Having received his first call up for the under-21 team in 2005, he made his first and only appearance against Northern Ireland in 2006.

== Early and personal life ==
Mackin was born in Chester, Cheshire, and grew up in nearby Blacon. His daughter was born in January 2011.

== Club career ==
=== Wrexham ===
Mackin played for Blacon Youth in their under-12 team and in the 1997–98 season was named League Player of the Year. He played for hometown club Chester City as a schoolboy before moving to Wrexham on the same basis at the age of 15. He progressed through their youth system and captained them in an FA Youth Cup match against Watford. He helped the youth team win a league championship, which resulted in him being given a squad number with the first team. He made his first-team debut at the age of 18 after starting in a 1–1 draw away to Wycombe Wanderers on 1 May 2004, the final match of 2003–04. His first appearance of 2004–05 came as a 50th-minute substitute in a 2–2 away draw with Hull City in the League Cup on 24 August 2004, which Wrexham won 3–1 in a penalty shoot-out. Mackin made his first league appearance of the season in a 5–1 defeat away to Luton Town as a 63rd-minute substitute on 6 November 2005 and his first start came on 11 December in a 3–0 away defeat against Milton Keynes Dons (MK Dons) as a replacement for the suspended Darren Ferguson. He suffered from a sore thigh in January 2005 and made his return as an 88th-minute substitute in a 0–0 home draw with MK Dons on 26 February. He fouled Steve Jenkins inside the penalty area during stoppage time away to Swindon Town on 19 March, which led to Sam Parkin scoring a penalty kick, the final goal in a 4–2 defeat for Wrexham. He finished the season with 11 appearances and signed his first professional contract on 11 July 2005.

Mackin drew praise from manager Denis Smith after scoring against Hereford United in a pre-season friendly in July 2005, saying "We wouldn't keep persevering with him if we didn't think he was any good". His first appearance of 2005–06 came as a 90th-minute substitute in a 1–0 defeat away to Notts County. He sustained a knee injury during a 1–0 home win over Darlington on 29 October 2005, which resulted in him being substituted in the 31st minute. He spent nearly three months injured before rejoining the squad for training towards the end of January 2006 and made his return on 4 February after coming on as a 20th-minute substitute in a 2–0 home victory over Wycombe. He finished the season with 19 appearances for Wrexham, having established himself as a regular member of the team. He entered negotiations over a new contract in June 2006, which he signed in July.

His first appearance of 2006–07 was in a 0–0 home draw with Peterborough United on 12 August 2006, a match he entered as a 59th-minute substitute. The next game he played in was a 4–1 victory away to Championship team Sheffield Wednesday in the League Cup on 23 August 2006. Mackin suffered a knee injury during a reserve-team match in September 2006 and made his return as a 90th-minute substitute in a 4–1 defeat after extra time away to Birmingham City of the Championship in the League Cup second round on 19 September. He picked up another knee injury in October 2006 and made his return in a 2–1 defeat at home to MK Dons on 14 October. An injury to Mark Jones allowed Mackin back into the team for a 4–0 defeat away to Boston United on 9 December 2006. His 2006–07 season finished with 11 appearances as opportunities in the team were "frustratingly rare" and he was offered a new long-term contract by Wrexham in May 2007.

His first appearance of 2007–08 came as a 75th-minute substitute in a 2–0 defeat away to Darlington on 11 August 2007 and following a 2–1 away defeat against Bradford City on 25 August he said "I'm pleased with my form at the moment because I've been working hard to try and stay in the team and I'm happy that things seem to be going well for me at the moment". Mackin joined Conference Premier club Droylsden on 24 January 2008 on a one-month loan, having made seven appearances for Wrexham by that point in 2007–08. He made his debut two days later in a 1–0 home victory over Kidderminster Harriers and on 31 January 2008 the loan was extended until the end of the season after earning "rave reviews" for his performances. His only goal for Droylsden came in the 70th minute against Torquay United on 1 April 2008, which was their only goal in a 2–1 home defeat. He made 15 appearances and scored 1 goal for Droylsden before returning to Wrexham after being recalled from the loan in April 2008. The four appearances he made following his return were described as "battling", and the last of these included his first goal for Wrexham in a 4–2 win away to Lincoln City on 3 May 2008, which was Wrexham's final match in the Football League before their relegation to the Conference Premier. He later commented "I got a little touch on it and I'm not sure if the defender got the final touch but it went straight in and I'm very pleased with it!" He finished the season with 11 appearances and 1 goal for Wrexham, with opportunities in the team again being rare.

A muscle strain forced Mackin to miss a pre-season friendly against Shrewsbury Town in July 2008 and he returned to pre-season training later that month. He was shown a red card after picking up two yellow cards in his first appearance of 2008–09, which was Wrexham's first match in the Conference Premier, as they beat Stevenage Borough 5–0 at home on 9 August 2008. On reflection, Mackin said "As for the second yellow I felt the ball was there to be won and I thought that's what I did. Looking back now I know I should have stayed on my feet". He was handed a one-match suspension and returned in a 1–1 draw away to Rushden & Diamonds on 17 August 2008. Mackin scored his first goal of the season with a 25-yard shot against Grays Athletic, which was Wrexham's only goal in a 2–1 away defeat on 20 September 2008. Despite starting the season as a regular in the team, he found opportunities hard to come by after the arrival of Dean Saunders as manager.

=== York City ===
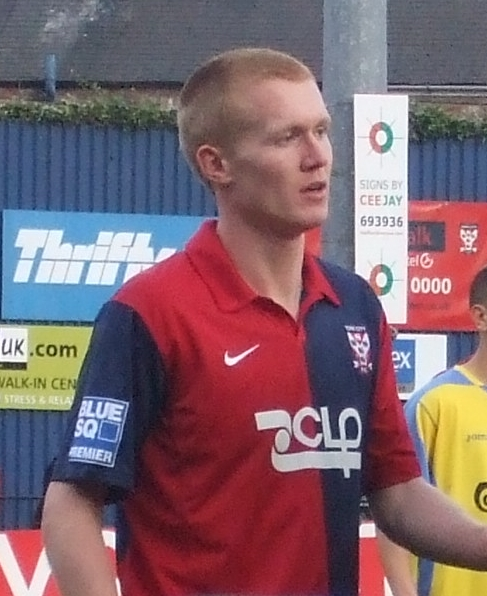
Mackin playing for York City in 2009

He joined Wrexham's Conference Premier rivals York City on 22 January 2009 on loan until the end of the season, after having made 20 appearances and scored 1 goal for Wrexham up to that point in 2008–09. Following the move, Mackin said "I need a change of scenery. We have a large number of players at the Racecourse at present and it's difficult to get into a side that's doing well and getting the results". He made his debut in a 2–1 defeat away to Eastbourne Borough on 24 January 2009 and was described in The Press as looking "off the pace". Mackin played for York in their 13–12 penalty shoot-out victory at home to Kidderminster in the FA Trophy third round on 12 February 2009, which had finished 1–1 after extra time. A tight thigh resulted in him missing a match against Oxford United in April 2009 and he made his return later that month in a 0–0 away draw with Barrow. Following the close of the league season, Mackin was described in The Press as one of York's most consistent performers throughout the season. He started in the 2009 FA Trophy Final at Wembley Stadium on 9 May 2009, which York lost 2–0 to Stevenage. According to The Press, he was "hardly noticed" in the match before receiving a yellow card for "scything down" Darren Murphy. He finished the loan spell with 21 appearances, and after returning to Wrexham was released after spending around a decade with the club.

Mackin signed for York permanently on 22 May 2009 on a one-year contract. After signing, manager Martin Foyle said "Levi was fantastic for us and came on in leaps and bounds. He was one of our most consistent players, but I know there's more to come from him." Mackin played in the opening match of 2009–10, a 2–1 defeat away to Oxford on 8 August 2009, and according to The Press was a "strong presence in the City midfield in a very committed performance". A foot infection led to him missing a match against Gateshead on 25 August 2009 and he made his return in a 2–0 home win over Crawley Town on 5 September as an 84th-minute substitute. His first start since 22 August 2009 came in a 2–2 home draw with Cambridge United on 22 September to fill in for Alex Lawless. This was the first of five consecutive matches to be started by Mackin before he had a six-match spell on the substitutes' bench. This came to an end when he started in the 1–0 victory away to AFC Wimbledon on 21 November 2009 and his performance drew praise from Foyle.

Mackin scored his first goal for York in a 2–1 away defeat to Forest Green Rovers on 6 March 2010, with his shot taking a deflection off David Brown. He picked up his 10th yellow card of the season in a 0–0 away draw with Altrincham, which resulted in a two-match suspension. He played in both legs of York's play-off semi-final victory over Luton, which finished 2–0 on aggregate. He started in the 2010 Conference Premier play-off final at Wembley Stadium on 16 May 2010, which York lost 3–1 to Oxford. He finished the season with 45 appearances and 1 goal for York and signed a new one-year contract with the club in May 2010.

Mackin made his first appearance of 2010–11 in the opening match, a 2–1 home defeat to Kidderminster on 14 August 2010, and was substituted in the 38th minute due to an injury and Foyle said "It looks a bad one and he might need a scan". The scan revealed no knee ligament damage had occurred and it was estimated he would be injured for a month. He returned to training in November 2010, having been out of the team injured for almost three months, returning as an 87th-minute substitute in a 3–0 home win over League Two team Rotherham United in an FA Cup first round replay on 17 November. He scored at home for the first time for York with the 85th-minute winner against Forest Green on 22 January 2011, the goal being a drilled shot into the bottom corner. Mackin finished the season with 13 appearances and 1 goal before being released by York in June 2011 after being told he could find another club.

=== Alfreton Town and Chester ===
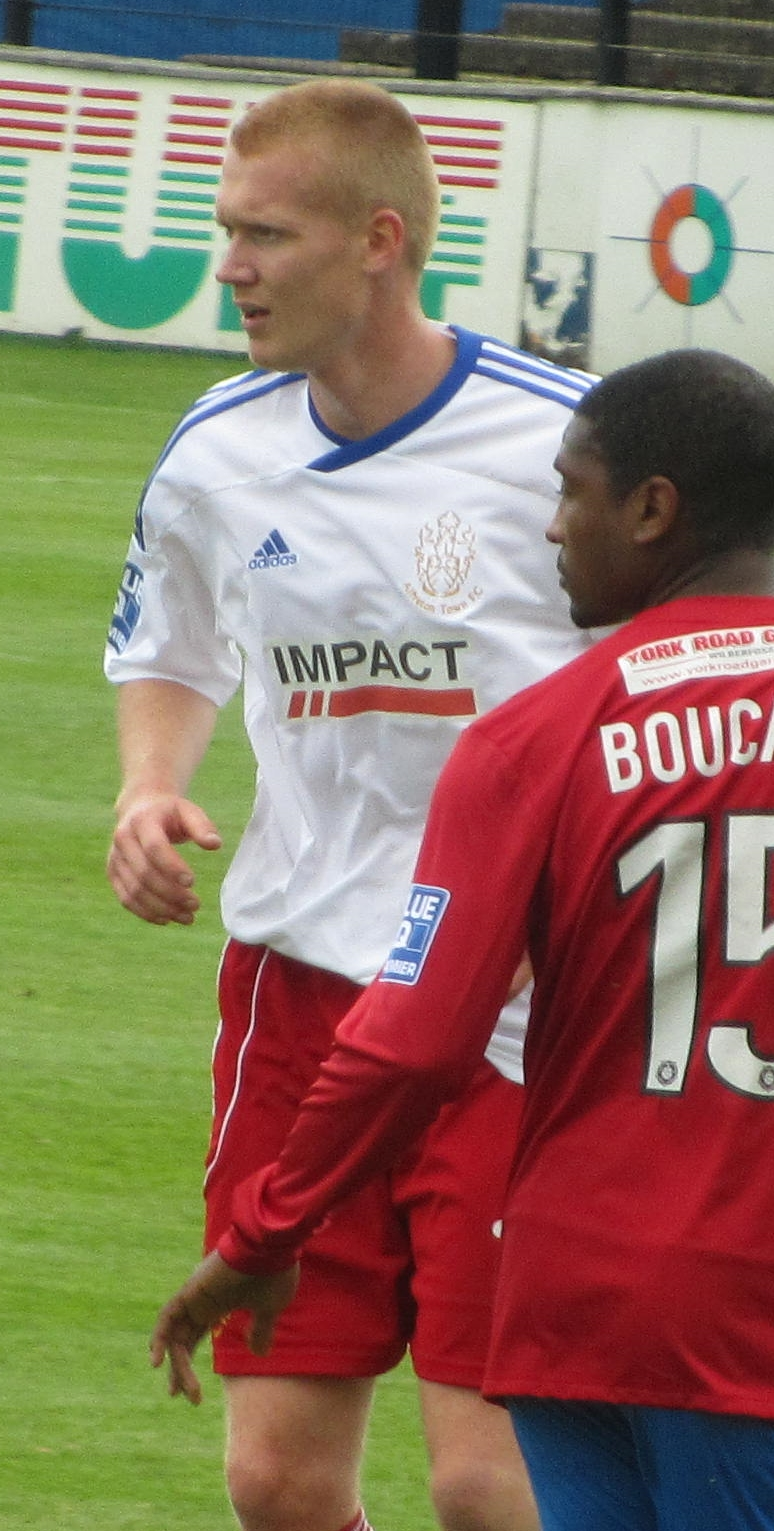
Mackin playing for Alfreton Town in 2011

Mackin signed for newly promoted Conference Premier club Alfreton Town on 2 July 2011 on a one-year contract. His debut came after starting in a 1–1 home draw with Darlington on 23 August 2011, scoring his first goal with a 43rd-minute penalty in a 1–0 victory away to York on 29 August. After struggling to break into the team he was released by Alfreton on 4 January 2012 after his contract was cancelled by mutual consent, having made 13 appearances and scored 1 goal for the club.

On the same day of his Alfreton release, Mackin signed for his hometown club Chester, joining the Northern Premier League Premier Division club on a contract until the end of 2011–12. Chester had been interested in signing him in the summer but he had opted to remain in full-time football with Alfreton. He scored on his debut with the final goal of a 4–0 victory over Rushall Olympic on 7 January 2011, having entered the match as a 73rd-minute substitute. He finished the season with one goal in six appearances having sustained a collar bone injury in his first start.

=== Later career ===
Mackin signed for Welsh Premier League club Bangor City on 17 January 2013. He made his debut as an 83rd-minute substitute in a 2–0 victory away to Gap Connah's Quay on 26 January 2013. His first goal came in a 3–3 home draw with Prestatyn Town on 9 February 2013. Mackin finished the season with 10 appearances and 1 goal for Bangor. He signed for Conwy Borough of the Cymru Alliance on 7 June 2013 and made his debut in a 2–0 win away to Guilsfield on 17 August. He was suspected to have sustained a toe injury in a 3–0 home win over Penycae on 17 September 2013 and this was the last of his eight appearances in 2013–14.

Mackin signed for Welsh Premier League club Rhyl on 24 June 2014. He left by mutual consent in August 2016 because of family and work commitments, and the following month signed for Cymru Alliance club Flint Town United. He signed a new contract with the club in June 2017. Mackin later played for Blacon Youth in the Cheshire League Division One, winning the Cheshire Amateur Cup with them in April 2019.

== International career ==
Mackin was involved in two matches with the Wales under-17 team, against Scotland and Norway in 2001 and 2002 respectively, although he did not play in either and remained on the substitutes' bench. He was called up for a training camp and match against Bosnia and Herzegovina in the 2003 UEFA European Under-17 Championship first qualifying round, and made an appearance in this match as Wales won 2–1 to progress to the second qualifying round. He was called into the under-19 team for the Milk Cup in July 2004 and another call up came for the 2005 UEFA European Under-19 Championship qualifier against the Faroe Islands in October.

Mackin was called into the under-21 squad for their match against England in September 2005. His first and only appearance came in a 1–0 defeat to Northern Ireland on 28 February 2006, in which he was substituted for Rob Davies in the 56th minute. Mackin returned to the under-21 team after being named on the standby list for a match against Turkey in September. He was named on standby for a two-legged play-off against England in October 2008. He was named in the Semi-Pro squad for a friendly against Poland in September 2009, although he was forced to withdraw due to an injury.

== Style of play ==
Mackin played as a central or defensive midfielder and was described as "tough tackling" and a "reliable holding player". He was "regularly in the right place to pick up loose balls and does not shirk away from tackles". He is energetic and has been praised as a ball-winner.

== Career statistics ==
Appearances and goals by club, season and competition
Club	Season	League			National Cup (Note: Includes FA Cup, Welsh Cup)		League Cup (Note: Includes Football League Cup, Welsh League Cup)		Other		Total	
Club	Season	Division	Apps	Goals	Apps	Goals	Apps	Goals	Apps	Goals	Apps	Goals
Wrexham	2003–04	Second Division	1	0	0	0	0	0	0	0	1	0
Wrexham	2004–05	League One	10	0	0	0	1	0	0	0	11	0
Wrexham	2005–06	League Two	17	0	0	0	1	0	1 (Note: Appearance in Football League Trophy)	0	19	0
Wrexham	2006–07	League Two	8	0	1	0	2	0	0	0	11	0
Wrexham	2007–08	League Two	9	1	0	0	2	0	0	0	11	1
Wrexham	2008–09	Conference Premier	16	1	2	0	—		2 (Note: Appearances in Conference League Cup)	0	20	1
Wrexham	Total		61	2	3	0	6	0	3	0	73	2
Droylsden (loan)	2007–08	Conference Premier	12	1	—		—		3 (Note: One appearance in FA Trophy, two in Conference League Cup)	0	15	1
York City (loan)	2008–09	Conference Premier	15	0	—		—		6 (Note: Appearance(s) in FA Trophy)	0	21	0
York City	2009–10	Conference Premier	34	1	3	0	—		8 (Note: Five appearances in FA Trophy, three in Conference Premier play-offs)	0	45	1
York City	2010–11	Conference Premier	12	1	1	0	—		0	0	13	1
York City	Total (York City)		61	2	4	0	—		14	0	79	2
Alfreton Town	2011–12	Conference Premier	11	1	2	0	—		0	0	13	1
Chester	2011–12	Northern Premier League; Premier Division	4	1	—		—		1	0	5	1
Chester	2012–13	Conference North	11	0	3	1	—		2	0	16	1
Chester	Total		15	1	3	1	—		3	0	21	2
Bangor City	2012–13	Welsh Premier League	8	1	2	0	—		—		10	1
Conwy Borough	2013–14	Cymru Alliance	7	0	0	0	1	0	—		8	0
Rhyl	2014–15	Welsh Premier League	26	1	4	0	1	0	—		31	1
Rhyl	2015–16	Welsh Premier League	23	1	0	0	1	0	—		24	1
Rhyl	2016–17	Welsh Premier League	2	0	—		—		—		2	0
Rhyl	Total		51	2	4	0	2	0	—		57	2
Flint Town United	2016–17	Cymru Alliance	14	2	2	0	0	0	3 (Note: Appearance(s) in Cymru Alliance League Cup)	0	19	2
Flint Town United	2017–18	Cymru Alliance	9	1	1	0	1	0	1	0	12	1
Flint Town United	Total		23	3	3	0	1	0	4	0	31	3
Career total			249	13	21	1	10	0	27	0	307	14
