= Lee McEvilly =

English footballer (born 1982)

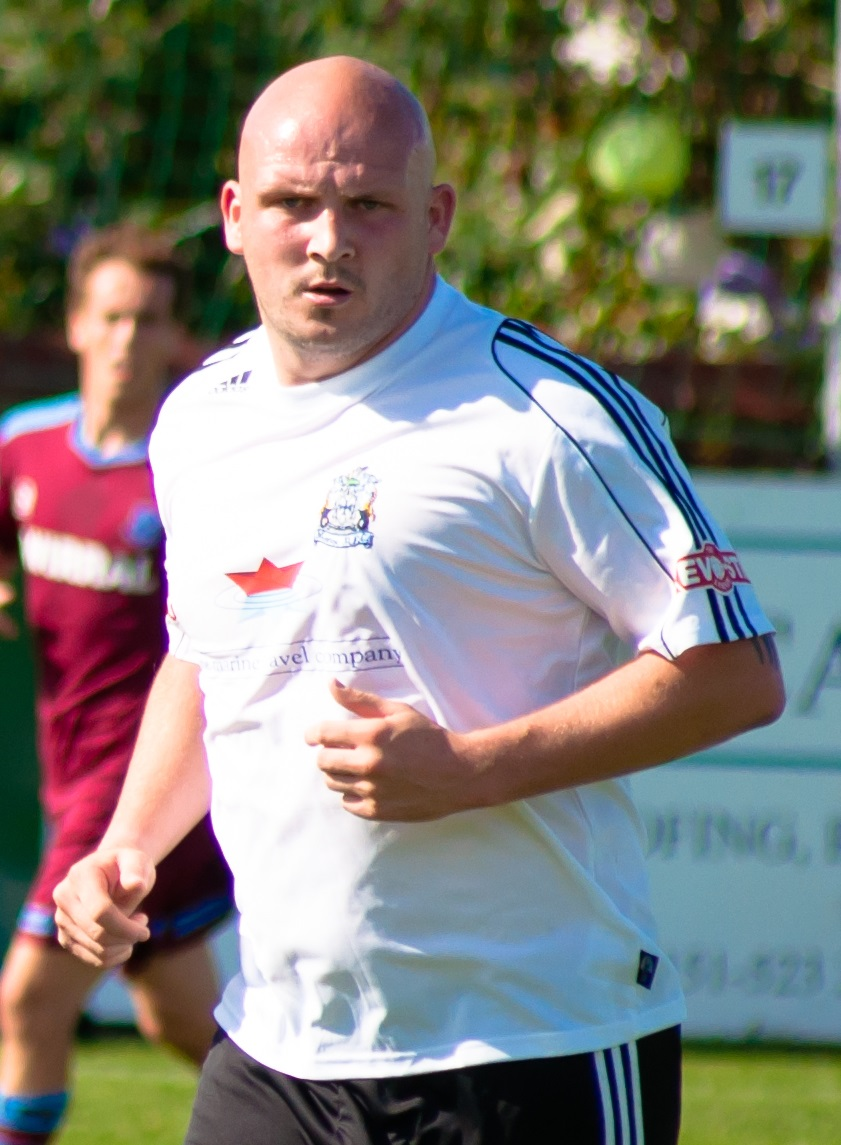
- McEvilly playing for Marine in 2012

Personal information
- Full name: Lee Richard McEvilly
- Date of birth: 15 April 1982 (age 44)
- Place of birth: Bootle, Liverpool, England
- Height: 6 ft 0 in (1.83 m)
- Position: Striker

Youth career
- –1999: Burscough

Senior career*
Years	Team	Apps	(Gls)
1999–2001	Burscough	49	(28)
2001–2004	Rochdale	87	(25)
2004	→ Accrington Stanley (loan)	6	(2)
2004–2005	Accrington Stanley	39	(15)
2005–2007	Wrexham	51	(14)
2007–2008	Accrington Stanley	11	(0)
2007–2008	→ Rochdale (loan)	7	(3)
2008	→ Cambridge United (loan)	14	(3)
2008–2009	Cambridge United	18	(8)
2008–2009	→ Rochdale (loan)	5	(2)
2009	Rochdale	11	(3)
2009	→ Barrow (loan)	6	(1)
2009	Grays Athletic	0	(0)
2010	Marine	6	(2)
2010	Barrow	6	(1)
2010	Sligo Rovers	1	(0)
2010–2011	Burscough	?	(?)
2011	Droylsden	4	(?)
2011	Chorley	12	(4)
2011–2012	Colwyn Bay	8	(3)
2012	AFC Fylde	10	(0)
2012	Warrington Town	?	(?)
2013	Barrow	6	(0)
2013	Droylsden	9	(1)
2018–?	Litherland REMYCA	?	(?)

International career^{‡}
2002–2003	Northern Ireland U21	9	(3)
2004	Northern Ireland U23	1	(0)
2002	Northern Ireland	1	(0)
- * Club domestic league appearances and goals as of 11:50, 13 August 2018 (UTC) ‡ National team caps and goals as of 12:09, 22 August 2009 (UTC)

Lee Richard McEvilly (born 15 April 1982) aka 'The Sheriff' is a retired footballer who played as a striker. Although born in England, he won one cap for the Northern Ireland national team in 2002 and also played for Northern Ireland at under-21 and under-23 levels.

McEvilly had a journeyman career, starting with non-League side Burscough, rising through their youth ranks to the senior side, where he made 49 league appearances, scoring 28 goals. In December 2001, Third Division club Rochdale signed him for £20,000. From 2004 to 2009 he had spells in the Conference National and League Two with Accrington Stanley, Cambridge United and Wrexham. McEvilly subsequently struggled with injuries, and in the second half of his career he had brief spells at numerous non-league clubs in England and Wales, as well as a brief period at League of Ireland side Sligo Rovers in 2010.

== Club career ==
=== Early career ===
McEvilly started his career at Burscough rising through the youth ranks, making his senior debut against Southport in the Liverpool Senior Cup final in August 1999. He went on to play 49 Northern Premier League games for Burscough, scoring 28 goals over two seasons. Rochdale manager John Hollins signed McEvilly in December 2001, for the Third Division club for a fee believed to be around £15,000 plus a sell-on clause. He made his debut for Rochdale in the Third Division against Kidderminster Harriers on 26 December in the 4–1 away defeat, replacing Clive Platt as a substitute in the 69th minute. McEvilly scored his first Football League goal, and his first for Rochdale against York City in their 5–4 home win on 5 February 2002. During McEvilly's first season with Rochdale, 2001–02, they reached the playoffs finishing fifth place. Rochdale were defeated by Rushden & Diamonds in the playoff semi-finals 4–3 on aggregate over two legs. During the first leg away at Nene Park, McEvilly scored in the 2–2 draw. He made a total of 18 appearances in the Third Division, scoring four goals. The following season, 2002–03, McEvilly played 37 games in the Third Division scoring 15 goals.

He started the 2003–04 season at Rochdale, making 16 appearances and scoring five goals in League Two. Rochdale's new manager Steve Parkin criticised McEvilly's fitness level to play and had described him as "too heavy", and that he needed "to get his physique down to an acceptable weight where he can get around the pitch". Conference National club Accrington Stanley signed McEvilly on a one-month loan in January 2004, making his debut in their 3–0 home win against Tamworth on 20 January. Despite playing out of position in wide right, McEvilly commented; "I was playing out of position but it was okay". He went on to describe the drop in level he said; "I have never played in the Conference but, from what I have seen, it is no different to Division Three." After a month at Accrington and making three appearances scoring one goal, his loan was extended in February for a further month, with manager John Coleman praising him as "a great acquisition to the squad". McEvilly went on to make a further three appearances, scoring once more before returning to Rochdale. On his return to Rochdale, he scored a further one goal in 14 appearances. At the end of the season, McEvilly was released by Rochdale on 10 May, signing a dater for Accrington Stanley on a permanent basis after a previous loan spell. On 13 November 2004, McEvilly scored a hat-trick in Accrington's 5–0 home victory over Northwich Victoria. During the 2004–05 season he made 39 appearances in the Conference National, scoring 15 goals.

=== Wrexham ===
Accrington Stanley accepted an undisclosed bid from Wrexham in July 2005, which included a sell-on clause and a bonus if he returned to play international football. He scored on his debut in a friendly against UEFA Champions League winners Liverpool in the 4–3 defeat after he came on as a substitute. McEvilly suffered a stress fracture in a metatarsus bone on his right foot in the 1–1 home draw with Notts County on 11 December, although he declared himself fit to play their following game against Carlisle United, he was substituted after 45 minutes after receiving a mouth injury which had required temporary dental surgery the same evening. His foot injury was later operated on and he received further dental treatment. His return to the Wrexham team following his injury was on 9 April 2006, in their 2–1 home defeat to Shrewsbury Town when he came on as a substitute replacing Matt Crowell in the 45th minute. He made a further three appearances scoring one goal, before breaking the same bone again in mid-April sidelining him until the end of the season. During the 2005–06 season, McEvilly made a total of 23 appearances for Wrexham, scoring seven goals in League Two.

In June 2006, McEvilly was set to join for Bradford City on a free transfer after agreeing a contract with the club. Despite McEvilly passing a medical, the move fell through as he was unwilling to train with Bradford during their pre-season without guarantee of a contract. Bradford City manager Colin Todd explained; "We were concerned about an old injury to his foot which has resulted in it being pinned and we are not prepared to take a risk with him". McEvilly opted to sign a new two-year contract with Wrexham. During pre-season with Wrexham, McEvilly broke his other foot, having previously broke the same bone twice in four-months during the previous season. His first appearance of the 2006–07 season, was on 25 November at home against Lincoln City in the 2–1 win in League Two, when he came on as a substitute for Kevin Smith in the 80th minute. McEvilly went on to make 28 appearances in League Two, scoring eight goals and a further two appearances in the FA Cup, scoring once against Championship side Derby County in their 3–1 defeat at Pride Park on 6 January. His contract was cancelled by mutual consent at the end of the season. Wrexham manager Brian Carey said that they are "well covered in terms of strikers" and "he is some way down the pecking order".

=== Return to Stanley ===
Accrington Stanley re-signed McEvilly on a one-year contract following his departure from Wrexham. On his return to Accrington he commented; "I am back here because I feel I have unfinished business. I played well for a year here and I want to do the same again". He had played 10 games in League Two and one game in the League Cup failing to score, and picking up a red card for violent conduct after a stamp on Peterborough United winger Jamie Day in their 2–0 home loss on 1 September. However, McEvilly struggled to hold down a regular place in the Accrington side and was loaned out to former club, Rochdale in November 2007. On his return to Spotland Stadium, he scored the only goal of Rochdale's 1–0 win over Mansfield Town on 24 November, with a shot from the edge of the penalty area. McEvilly made a total of seven appearances for Rochdale scoring three goals, before returning in January 2008. He made one more appearance for Accrington, coming on as a substitute in the 73rd minute for Paul Mullin in the 2–0 defeat to Stockport County on 12 January, before joining Cambridge United on loan on 18 January. McEvilly made 14 appearances and scored three goals for Cambridge, helping them finish second place in the 2007–08 Conference National, securing a place in the playoffs. In Cambridge's playoff semi-final first leg, they drew 2–2 with Burton Albion away at the Pirelli Stadium with McEvilly scoring both Cambridge's goals. Cambridge were 2–0 down and McEvilly came on as a substitute for Mark Beesley in the 74th minute. Paul Hurst was deemed to have handled in the penalty area, and four minutes later McEvilly converted the penalty four minutes after coming off the bench. He scored his second goal from a direct free kick. In the following leg, McEvilly started the game and had a shot within the opening 30 seconds which Rob Wolleaston managed to score from the rebound, before being replaced by Leo Fortune-West in the 77th minute. McEvilly played in the final, in which Exeter City defeated Cambridge 1–0 at Wembley Stadium.

=== Cambridge United ===
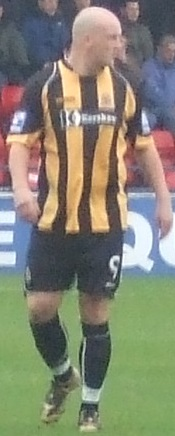
McEvilly playing for Cambridge United in 2008

McEvilly signed a permanent two-year deal with Cambridge the following 2008–09 season, after being released on a free transfer from Accrington Stanley. On 10 October, he was sent off in the 87th minute of Cambridge's 1–0 win over Weymouth, for violent conduct after the referee deemed a tackle to be dangerous. He went on to make 18 appearances for Cambridge scoring eight goals in the Conference National, before returning to the Football League to rejoin Rochdale, initially on loan in November, with the possibility of a permanent transfer in January. McEvilly stated he was glad to be back "home" at Rochdale.

=== Return to Rochdale ===
He made five appearances, scoring twice on loan at Rochdale before signing permanently on an 18-month contract on 1 January 2009. McEvilly made 10 more appearances, starting just once and scoring three goals, before joining Barrow on loan in March, citing his friendship with joint-manager David Bayliss as a key reason for his move. He scored seven his debut on 21 March at home against Lewes, which finished as a 2–0 victory. In Barrow's next match on 29 March, he was sent off against Weymouth for the second time that season after he received two yellow cards in the 3–0 away win, picking up the first for kicking the ball away in the first half and then a second in the 69th minute for a foul on Gavin Hoyte, resulting his dismissal. He made six appearances in the Conference National for Barrow, scoring once. On 2 May, McEvilly made one last appearance for Rochdale in their 1–0 home defeat to Gillingham, replacing Adam Rundle as a substitute in the 75th minute. Rochdale terminated his contract by mutual consent at the end of the season.

=== Non-league career ===
At the start of the 2009–10 season, McEvilly signed for Grays Athletic along with eight other players, turning down offers from Northern Premier League Premier Division club Marine and Maltese Premier League club Hibernians. McEvilly picked up a long-term shin injury delaying his debut for Grays, and he was eventually released by the club in November without making a single appearance. In January 2010, Marine announced that McEvilly had signed for the club. Marine chairman Paul Leary described McEvilly as a "massive signing" for the club. He played six matches during his spell in Crosby, scoring twice, before leaving to rejoin Barrow on a short-term contract until the end of the 2009–10 campaign. In the 2010 FA Trophy Final against Stevenage Borough, he replaced Gregg Blundell in the 72nd minute before scoring with his first touch to level the match at 1–1. Barrow went on to win the game 2–1 after extra time, but it proved to be the end of McEvilly's spell at Holker Street as he was released at the end of the season.

After leaving Barrow, McEvilly began training with Sligo Rovers of the League of Ireland Premier Division in June 2010. He made only one league appearance for the side, coming on as a substitute in the 2–1 defeat to Shamrock Rovers on 2 July 2010. In November 2010, he returned to his first senior club Burscough, signing a permanent contract with the Northern Premier League outfit. He made his debut on 11 December 2010 as a second-half substitute in the 3–2 loss against Bradford Park Avenue. Three weeks later, he got on the scoresheet for the first time during his second spell at the club, scoring both Burscough goals in the 4–2 defeat to Kendal Town. McEvilly went on to stay at Victoria Park for three months before transferring to Conference North side Droylsden along with goalkeeper Sean Lake in March 2011.

McEvilly signed for Garry Flitcroft's Chorley at the start of the 2011–12 season. He scored his first goal in a 6–0 home victory over Frickley Athletic and went on to play 12 league games for the club, scoring four times. However, on 13 October, McEvilly was released after failing to hold down a first team spot. He subsequently joined Colwyn Bay on 27 October 2011. He signed for AFC Fylde in February 2012 to work with Dave Challinor again, but was released at the end of the campaign. In August 2012, McEvilly signed for Warrington Town, the fourteenth different club of his career. After being released by Warrington in December 2012 he spent time training with Barrow and officially joined the club on non-contract terms on 31 January 2013—the start of his third spell with the Cumbrian outfit. After 6 matches he dropped down a division, signing for Droylsden, leaving after the club was relegated from the Northern Premier League Premier Division at the end of the 2012–13 season.

After leaving Droylsden, McEvilly's career is not documented, but he is presumed to have continued playing in amateur football. In July 2018, he signed as a player-coach for Litherland REMYCA in the North West Counties Football League Premier Division. The manager who had hired him, James Olsen, left Litherland in December 2018, and it is unknown how much longer McEvilly stayed at the club.

== International career ==
Sammy McIlroy called McEvilly up to the Northern Ireland squad to face Spain in an international friendly on 17 April 2002 at Windsor Park, Belfast. He earned his first cap, replacing Warren Feeney as a substitute in the 63rd minute in the 5–0 defeat to Spain. He went on to play for Northern Ireland under-21, gaining nine caps scoring three goals between September 2002 and October 2003. On 27 April 2004, McEvilly played for Northern Ireland under-23 team in the 0–0 home draw against Serbia & Montenegro. McEvilly was called up to the Northern Ireland national squad again in May 2006, to face United States but he failed to make an appearance.

== Playing style ==
Rochdale assistant manager David Hamilton described McEvilly saying; "He's strong, powerful, can shoot with both feet and can score goals. He has good all-round ability and is tremendously tenacious". His aggressive and robust playing style earned him the nickname "Evil".

== Personal life ==
Prior to playing professional football for Rochdale, McEvilly worked at McDonald's fast food restaurant. He was born in Liverpool, Merseyside, and is an Everton supporter.
