= Mick Jones =

Mick Jones may refer to:

== Music ==
- Mick Jones (Foreigner guitarist) (born 1944), English guitarist, songwriter and record producer in the rock band Foreigner and earlier Spooky Tooth
  - Mick Jones (album), a 1989 album by Foreigner musician Mick Jones
- Mick Jones (The Clash guitarist) (born 1955), British guitarist and a vocalist of the Clash
- Micky Jones, British guitarist and a vocalist of Welsh prog band Man
- Mickey Jones (1941–2018), American musician and actor

== Sports ==
- Mick Jones (footballer, born 1942), English footballer
- Mick Jones (footballer, born 1945), of the Leeds United football team
- Mick Jones (footballer, born 1947) (1947–2022), English football player and football manager
- Mick Jones (hammer thrower) (born 1963), British hammer thrower

== See also ==
- Michael Jones (disambiguation)
