= Jonathan Walters =

Irish footballer (born 1983)

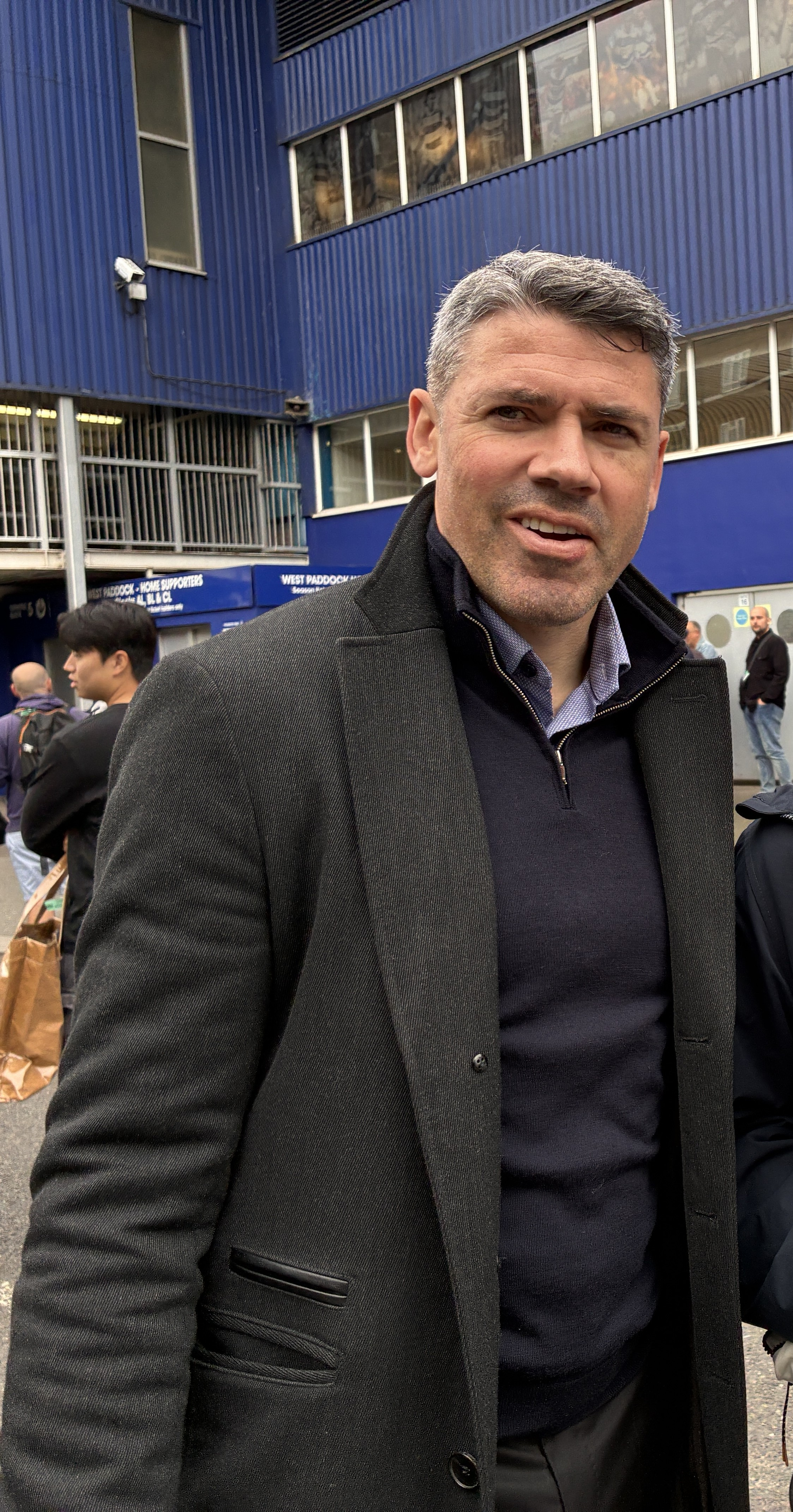
- Walters in 2025.

Personal information
- Full name: Jonathan Ronald Walters
- Date of birth: 20 September 1983 (age 43)
- Place of birth: Moreton, Merseyside, England
- Height: 6 ft 0 in (1.83 m)
- Position: Forward

Team information
- Current team: Stoke City (sporting director)

Youth career
- Shaftesbury
- 1998–2000: Blackburn Rovers

Senior career*
Years	Team	Apps	(Gls)
2000–2001	Blackburn Rovers	0	(0)
2001–2004	Bolton Wanderers	4	(0)
2003	→ Hull City (loan)	11	(5)
2003	→ Crewe Alexandra (loan)	0	(0)
2003–2004	→ Barnsley (loan)	8	(0)
2004–2005	Hull City	37	(2)
2005	→ Scunthorpe United (loan)	3	(0)
2005–2006	Wrexham	38	(5)
2006–2007	Chester City	26	(9)
2007–2010	Ipswich Town	136	(30)
2010–2017	Stoke City	226	(43)
2017–2019	Burnley	3	(0)
2018	→ Ipswich Town (loan)	3	(0)
Total		495	(94)

International career
2003	Republic of Ireland U21	1	(2)
2007	Republic of Ireland B	1	(0)
2010–2018	Republic of Ireland	54	(14)
- * Club domestic league appearances and goals

Jonathan Ronald Walters (born 20 September 1983) is a former professional footballer who played as a forward. He is sporting director of Stoke City.

Walters started his senior career at Blackburn Rovers but failed to break into the first team and joined Bolton Wanderers. He then went out on loan to Hull City, Crewe Alexandra and Barnsley before joining Hull permanently. He then went on to play for Wrexham and Chester City before finally finding regular football at Championship side Ipswich Town. Walters spent three years at Portman Road before joining Stoke City for £2.75 million in August 2010. He scored twice in the 2011 FA Cup semi-final against Bolton Wanderers to bring the final score to 5–0, with Stoke reaching the 2011 FA Cup Final. Walters played 54 matches during the 2011–12 season and then played in UEFA Euro 2012 with the Republic of Ireland. Walters remained a regular at Stoke under managers Tony Pulis and Mark Hughes, scoring 62 goals in 271 appearances, before joining Burnley in July 2017.

Walters scored five times for the Republic of Ireland in 2015 during their successful UEFA Euro 2016 qualifying campaign, and was acknowledged with that year's FAI Senior International Player of the Year award.

== Club career ==
=== Blackburn Rovers ===
Walters was born in Moreton, Merseyside and started his career at Blackburn Rovers having been spotted by playing for Shaftesbury under 16s in the Eastham & District Junior League by Rovers' scout for Wirral and Wales, Mike O'Brien who moved quickly to sign him. He played for Blackburn's youth and reserve teams where he scored prolifically, helping the club reach the FA Youth Cup final in 2001, losing 6–3 on aggregate to Arsenal. However his promising career with Rovers was ended due to a 'serious breach of club discipline' which was described as 'totally out of character' and saw him suspended by the club.

=== Bolton Wanderers ===
He then joined Bolton Wanderers for a fee of £50,000 following interest from numerous clubs. He played in four Premier League games for Bolton making his professional debut as an 85th-minute substitute in a 2–1 defeat to Charlton Athletic, before signing for Hull City on loan in 2003. On his debut for Hull Walters scored twice in a 5–1 win over Carlisle United. Following his loan spell at Hull, Walters returned to Bolton, where he again went out on loan, this time to Crewe Alexandra however he failed to make an appearance for Crewe due to a tooth infection. In the 2003–04 season he joined Barnsley on loan and played eight league games for the "Tykes".

=== Hull City ===
Walters signed for Hull City for a second time in 2004, this time on a permanent transfer. In February 2005, he joined Scunthorpe United on a one-month loan deal and made three appearances for the "Iron".

=== Wrexham ===
After scoring only three goals for Hull in two seasons, Walters was sold to League Two side Wrexham. Upon signing for the club, Walters believed that he made the right choice moving closer to his Merseyside home. He played in 41 matches in the 2005–06 season, scoring against Cheltenham Town, Stockport County, Torquay United (twice) and Mansfield Town.

=== Chester City ===
He spent the 2005–06 season at Wrexham before he joined their rivals Chester City in 2006. Walters thrived under the management of Mark Wright and scored ten goals in 33 matches. He impressed in an FA Cup tie against Ipswich Town, prompting Ipswich manager Jim Magilton to make a £100,000 bid for Walters, which was accepted.

=== Ipswich Town ===
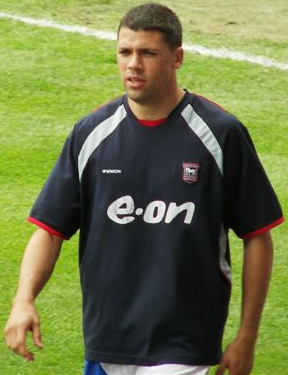
Walters playing for Ipswich Town in 2007

Walters agreed terms with Ipswich on a deal worth £100,000 plus add-ons in mid-January 2007, having impressed in FA Cup ties between the clubs earlier in the month. He made his debut for Ipswich on 30 January 2007 in a 0–0 draw at Stoke City. Walters scored his first goal for Ipswich in their 2–1 victory over Queens Park Rangers at Portman Road on 3 March 2007. Walters ended the 2006–07 season with goals against Barnsley and a brace on the final day of the season against Cardiff City. He scored his first ever senior hat-trick in the 6–0 win over Bristol City in November 2007 at Portman Road, in the same week he received a call-up to the Republic of Ireland B squad. On 12 January 2008, he extended his contract with Ipswich until 2011. He had surgery on a niggling knee problem on 19 March 2008 and returned to action against Norwich City on 13 April in half the expected time.

Walters played 41 times for Ipswich scoring 13 goals in 2007–08 as the Tractor Boys missed out on a play-off place by just one point. His performances during the season earned him the Player of the Year and Players' Player of the Year awards. The 2008–09 season saw Walters again play 41 matches, scoring seven goals as Ipswich failed to build on last season and finished in 9th position. The 2009–10 season under the management of Roy Keane saw Ipswich struggle to score goals with Walters top-scoring with only eight and Ipswich finished the season in a poor 15th position. In August 2010, Walters expressed to Roy Keane his desire to leave Portman Road after Stoke City made an offer for him.

=== Stoke City ===
On 18 August 2010, Walters joined Premier League side Stoke City for an initial £2.75 million fee on a four-year contract. He made his Stoke debut on 21 August 2010 against Tottenham Hotspur. He scored his first goal on 24 August 2010 in a 2–1 Football League Cup win over Shrewsbury Town. He scored his first league goal for Stoke on 2 October 2010 in a 1–0 win over Blackburn Rovers. After the match, Walters earned praise from his former manager Sam Allardyce, and City manager Tony Pulis. In November, Walters scored twice for Stoke in a 3–0 win over West Bromwich Albion, the first goal coming from the penalty spot and the other via a rebound from Scott Carson.

In January 2011, Walters scored twice for City in a 2–0 FA Cup third round replay win at Cardiff City. It took him until the end of March 2011 to find the back of the net in the Premier League again, scoring in a 4–0 win over Newcastle United. He scored in the next match against Chelsea and was named as Man of the Match. Following the match, Tony Pulis spoke of his delight at Walters' improved performances. "Jon's come from the Championship and sometimes it takes time to have the confidence and the belief to make the step up. He had an up-and-down start but he's been fantastic for us. He's certainly my type of player, he gives everything, he never stops and whatever you've paid him, you know he's earned it."

Walters scored twice in Stoke's 5–0 rout over former club Bolton Wanderers in the FA Cup semi-final at Wembley to help Stoke into their first FA Cup Final. Walters described it as the pinnacle of his career. Walters ended the 2010–11 season as joint top goalscorer with Kenwyne Jones, both having scored 12 goals. His first goal against Bolton in the semi-final won Goal of the Season. He played in the 2011 FA Cup Final against Manchester City as Stoke lost 1–0.

Walters played in his first European match on 28 July against Hajduk Split where he scored the only goal in a 1–0 Stoke win. He signed a 12-month contract extension in August 2011. Walters went on to play in 31 matches during the first half of the 2011–12 season scoring seven goals. In March 2012, Walters won the Sir Stanley Matthews Potteries Footballers of the Year award for 2012. Speaking after picking up the award, Walters revealed that he would like to remain at Stoke for the rest of his career. By 21 April 2012, Walters had played in 50 matches during the 2011–12 campaign and scored nine goals of which five were penalties. This led to Walters being criticised by some Stoke supporters but he was backed by his manager. On his 100th appearance for Stoke, Walters scored twice against his old club Bolton Wanderers in a 2–2 draw on the final day of the season, a result which relegated the "Trotters".

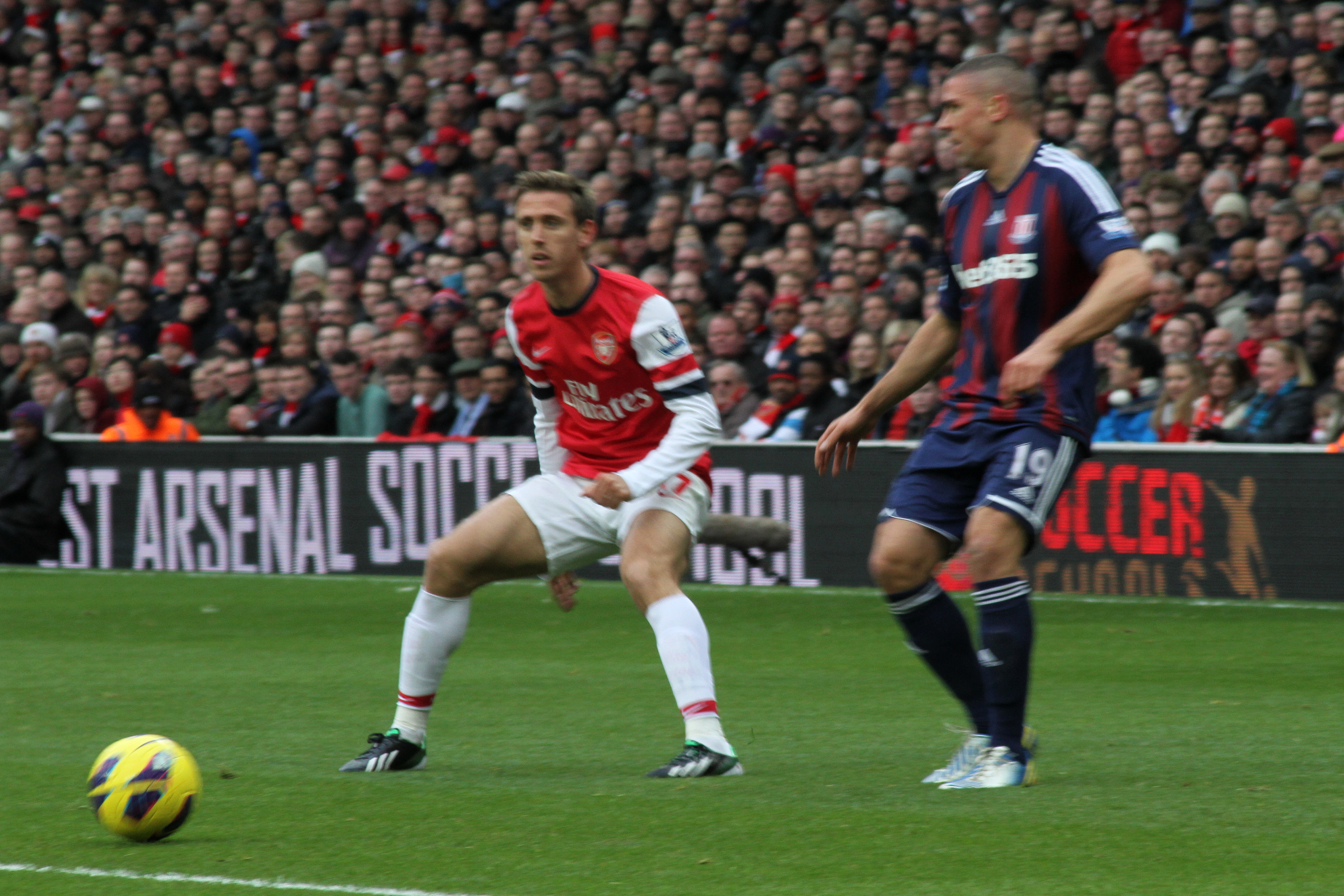
Walters (right) playing for Stoke City in 2013

Walters continued to be a virtual ever-present in the 2012–13 season as he went on to make a club-record 61 consecutive Premier League starts by 3 November 2012. He scored a well-worked set-piece in a 1–1 draw against West Ham United which earned praise from pundit Gary Neville. He scored twice against Liverpool on Boxing Day 2012 in a 3–1 victory.

On 12 January 2013, whilst playing against Chelsea, Walters scored two own goals becoming only the fourth player to do so in the Premier League, he also missed a penalty in the match as Stoke lost 4–0. He made amends three days later, scoring twice in an FA Cup third round replay victory over Crystal Palace. Walters played in every match in the 2012–13 season and was the club's top-scorer with 11 goals. The final game of the season against Southampton was his 89th consecutive league start.

Walters made a bad start to the 2013–14 season against Liverpool. After being awarded a last-minute penalty, he saw his shot easily saved by Simon Mignolet and Stoke went on to lose the match 1–0. However, despite this Walters insisted that he would not shy away from taking penalties. On 10 November 2013, Walters featured in his 100th consecutive Premier League match and marked the occasion by scoring in a 3–3 draw with Swansea City. His run of 102 consecutive league starts ended on 4 December 2013 against Cardiff City after picking up an injury. Walters scored a penalty against Arsenal in a 1–0 win on 1 March 2014. He also scored from the spot in the next match against Norwich City but was later sent off for the first time in his career for a high challenge on Alexander Tettey. Walters ended the 2013–14 season with five goals in 36 matches as the Potters finished in 9th position.

Walters opened his account for the 2014–15 season with a brace against Portsmouth in the League Cup. He also scored winning goals against Swansea City, Tottenham Hotspur and Arsenal. On 31 January 2015, Walters became the first Stoke player to score a Premier League hat-trick in a 3–1 victory over Queens Park Rangers. Walters scored his 50th Stoke goal on 24 May 2015 in a 6–1 victory against Liverpool. In total, he scored 11 goals in 36 appearances in 2014–15 as Stoke finished in ninth position for a second consecutive season.

With Walters entering into the final year of his contract, Stoke rejected a bid from Norwich City at the start of the 2015–16 season. Walters vented his frustration with contract talks claiming the club were undervaluing him. This led to him handing in a transfer request but despite this he failed to secure a move away from the club. Walters then scored in back-to-back matches against Leicester City and Bournemouth. Chief executive Tony Scholes stated that he hoped the club could reach a 'compromise' with Walters over his contract. His contract dispute was resolved and he signed a new two-and-a-half-year deal with Stoke on 7 November 2015. Walters played 33 times in 2015–16, scoring eight goals as the Potters again finished in ninth position.

Walters played 24 times in 2016–17, scoring four goals as Stoke finished in 13th.

=== Burnley ===
On 7 July 2017, Walters joined fellow Premier League side Burnley on a two-year contract for a fee of £3 million. He was restricted to just five appearances in the 2017–18 season as he struggled with a recurring knee injury and on his return to action wasn't able to force his way into Sean Dyche's plans.

Walters re-joined Ipswich Town, on loan, on 30 August 2018. However, after making only three appearances for the club, Walters was ruled out for six months due to an Achilles injury on 26 September, making him unavailable for the rest of his loan spell at the club.

Walters announced his retirement from football on 22 March 2019 after struggling to recover from his Achilles injury.

== International career ==
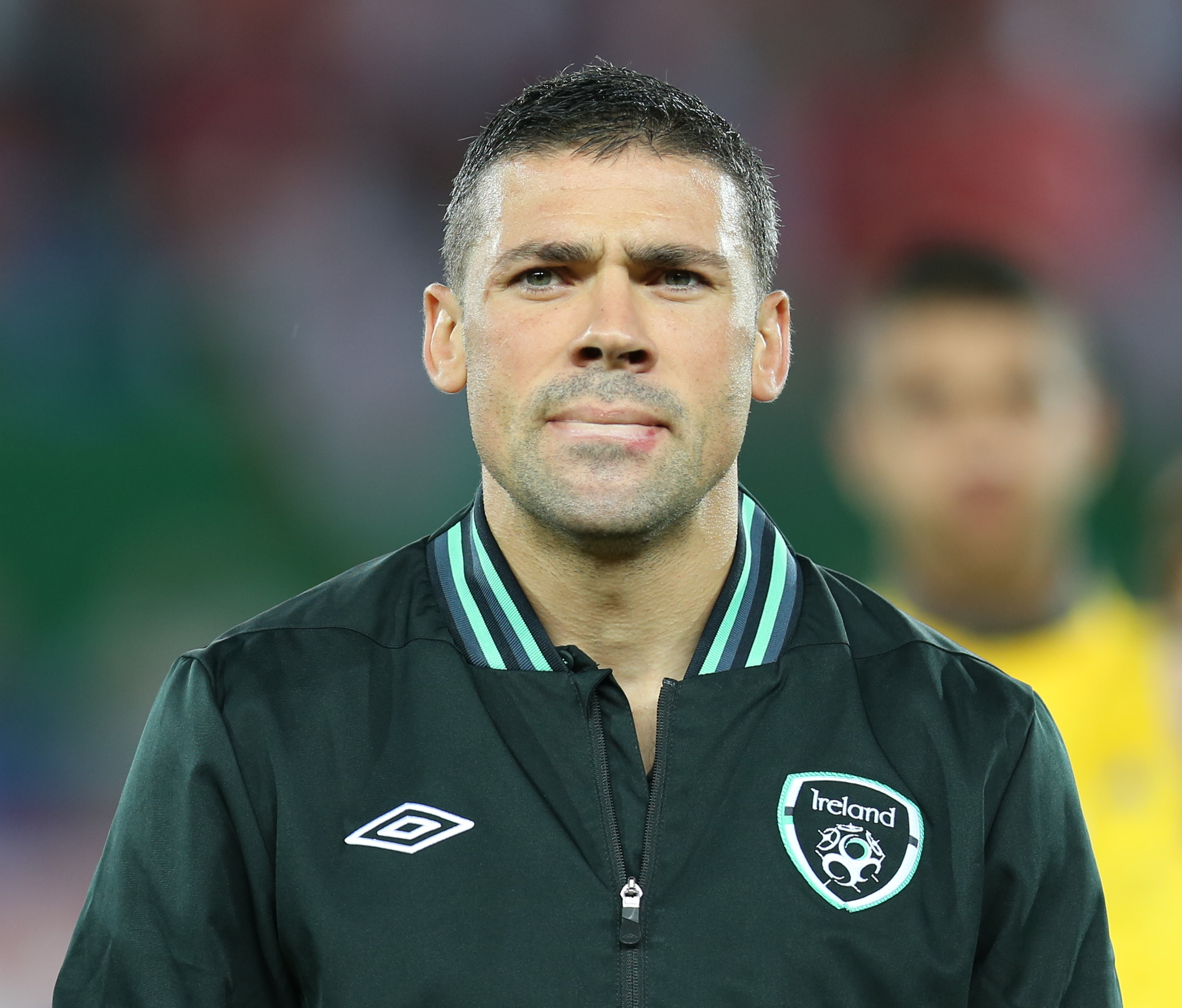
Walters in action for the Republic of Ireland, September 2013.

Walters qualifies to play for the Republic of Ireland national team through his Irish mother. He made his international debut for Republic of Ireland U21 against Switzerland in October 2003, scoring twice in a 2–0 win. He also played for the Republic of Ireland B team against Scotland B team in 2007. In 2010, Ireland manager Giovanni Trapattoni stated that he could give Walters a call up to the national side in the future. He was called up in November 2010 for the friendly match against Norway and was brought on as a half-time substitute in that game to make his senior international début. Walters was given the nod ahead of Simon Cox in the crucial Play-off game against Estonia and Walters repaid by scoring his first international goal in the 4–0 victory over Estonia in Tallinn in the first leg of the UEFA Euro 2012 qualifying play-offs. On 26 March 2013, Walters scored two goals against Austria before a late strike from David Alaba gave the Austrians a 2–2 draw.

Walters was included in Giovanni Trappatoni's 23-man squad for Euro 2012. During the tournament Walters made substitute appearances in all three of Ireland's group games during the tournament as Ireland were eliminated finishing their group with 0 points.

Walters scored twice in a UEFA Euro 2016 play-off against Bosnia and Herzegovina on 16 November 2015 to earn Ireland a 2–0 victory and qualification to UEFA Euro 2016.

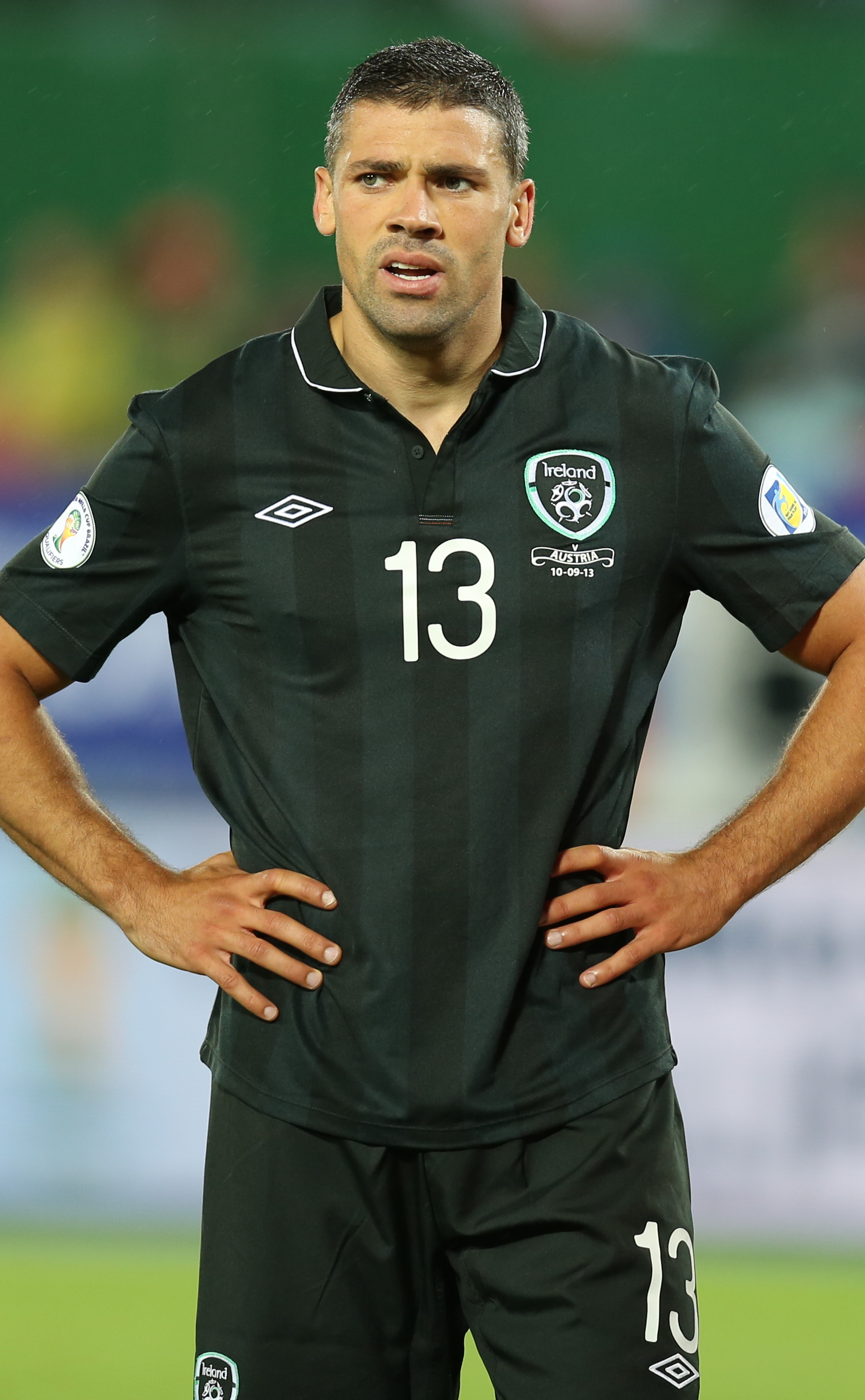
Walters playing for the Republic of Ireland in 2013.

Walters was named as a part of Martin O’Neill’s 23-man squad for Euro 2016. Walters started Ireland’s first game of the tournament, a 1-1 draw with Sweden, and made a substitute appearance in Ireland’s 2-1 Round of 16 defeat vs France.

== Post-playing career ==
In May 2021, Walters was invited to join the coaching staff of Republic of Ireland U19s for a three-day training camp based in England. In December 2022, Walters was appointed Technical Director of League One club Fleetwood Town. In addition to this, he would also hold the role at Fleetwood's sister club Waterford. He left these roles after six months at the end of the 2022–23 season. On 22 February 2024, following the departure of Ricky Martin, Walters returned to former club Stoke City in the role of Interim Technical Director. In April 2024 Walters, was appointed as sporting director on a permanent basis.

== Personal life ==
Walters was brought up in Moreton, Merseyside, and the house in which he lived was opposite a number of community football pitches. He grew up supporting Everton. He is married and has two daughters and a son. One of his daughters, Scarlett was born with gastroschisis. His mother died when he was young and was brought up by his father James, along with his brothers Aidan and James and his sister Samantha.

== Career statistics ==
=== Club ===
Appearances and goals by club, season and competition
Club	Season	League			FA Cup		League Cup		Other		Total	
Club	Season	Division	Apps	Goals	Apps	Goals	Apps	Goals	Apps	Goals	Apps	Goals
Blackburn Rovers	2000–01	First Division	0	0	0	0	0	0	—		0	0
Bolton Wanderers	2001–02	Premier League	0	0	0	0	0	0	—		0	0
Bolton Wanderers	2002–03	Premier League	4	0	1	0	1	0	—		6	0
Bolton Wanderers	2003–04	Premier League	0	0	—		0	0	—		0	0
Bolton Wanderers	Total		4	0	1	0	1	0	—		6	0
Hull City (loan)	2002–03	Third Division	11	5	—		—		—		11	5
Crewe Alexandra (loan)	2002–03	Second Division	0	0	—		—		—		0	0
Barnsley (loan)	2003–04	Second Division	8	0	3	0	—		1 (Note: Appearance in Football League Trophy)	0	12	0
Hull City	2003–04	Third Division	16	1	—		—		—		16	1
Hull City	2004–05	League One	21	1	2	1	1	0	1	0	25	2
Hull City	Total		37	2	2	1	1	0	1	0	41	3
Scunthorpe United (loan)	2004–05	League Two	3	0	—		—		—		3	0
Wrexham	2005–06	League Two	38	5	1	0	1	0	1	0	41	5
Chester City	2006–07	League Two	26	9	5	1	1	0	1	0	33	10
Ipswich Town	2006–07	Championship	16	4	0	0	0	0	—		16	4
Ipswich Town	2007–08	Championship	40	13	0	0	1	0	—		41	13
Ipswich Town	2008–09	Championship	36	5	2	1	3	1	—		41	7
Ipswich Town	2009–10	Championship	43	8	2	0	2	0	—		47	8
Ipswich Town	2010–11	Championship	1	0	—		—		—		1	0
Ipswich Town	Total		136	30	4	1	6	1	—		146	32
Stoke City	2010–11	Premier League	36	6	7	5	3	1	—		46	12
Stoke City	2011–12	Premier League	38	7	4	2	2	0	10 (Note: Appearance(s) in UEFA Europa League)	2	54	11
Stoke City	2012–13	Premier League	38	8	3	2	1	1	—		42	11
Stoke City	2013–14	Premier League	32	5	2	0	2	0	—		36	5
Stoke City	2014–15	Premier League	32	8	2	1	2	2	—		36	11
Stoke City	2015–16	Premier League	27	5	1	1	5	2	—		33	8
Stoke City	2016–17	Premier League	23	4	0	0	1	0	—		24	4
Stoke City	Total		226	43	19	11	16	6	10	2	271	62
Burnley	2017–18	Premier League	3	0	1	0	1	0	—		5	0
Burnley	2018–19	Premier League	0	0	0	0	0	0	1	0	1	0
Burnley	Total		3	0	1	0	1	0	1	0	6	0
Ipswich Town (loan)	2018–19	Championship	3	0	—		—		—		3	0
Career total			495	94	36	14	27	7	15	2	573	117

=== International ===
Appearances and goals by national team and year
National team	Year	Apps	Goals
Republic of Ireland	2010	1	0
Republic of Ireland	2011	3	1
Republic of Ireland	2012	10	1
Republic of Ireland	2013	10	2
Republic of Ireland	2014	6	1
Republic of Ireland	2015	8	5
Republic of Ireland	2016	8	2
Republic of Ireland	2017	5	2
Republic of Ireland	2018	3	0
Total		54	14

Scores and results list Republic of Ireland's goal tally first, score column indicates score after each Walters goal.

List of international goals scored by Jonathan Walters
No.	Date	Venue	Cap	Opponent	Score	Result	Competition	Ref.
1	11 November 2011	A. Le Coq Arena, Tallinn, Estonia	4	Estonia	2–0	4–0	UEFA Euro 2012 qualifying	
2	16 October 2012	Tórsvøllur, Tórshavn, Faroe Islands	14	Faroe Islands	2–0	4–1	2014 FIFA World Cup qualification	
3	26 March 2013	Aviva Stadium, Dublin, Ireland	17	Austria	1–1	2–2	2014 FIFA World Cup qualification	
4	26 March 2013	Aviva Stadium, Dublin, Ireland	17	Austria	2–1	2–2	2014 FIFA World Cup qualification	
5	25 May 2014	Aviva Stadium, Dublin, Ireland	26	Turkey	1–2	1–2	Friendly	
6	13 June 2015	Aviva Stadium, Dublin, Ireland	33	Scotland	1–0	1–1	UEFA Euro 2016 qualifying	
7	7 September 2015	Aviva Stadium, Dublin, Ireland	35	Georgia	1–0	1–0	UEFA Euro 2016 qualifying	
8	11 October 2015	National Stadium, Warsaw, Poland	37	Poland	1–1	1–2	UEFA Euro 2016 qualifying	
9	16 November 2015	Aviva Stadium, Dublin, Ireland	38	Bosnia and Herzegovina	1–0	2–0	UEFA Euro 2016 qualifying	
10	16 November 2015	Aviva Stadium, Dublin, Ireland	38	Bosnia and Herzegovina	2–0	2–0	UEFA Euro 2016 qualifying	
11	31 August 2016	Aviva Stadium, Dublin, Ireland	42	Oman	3–0	4–0	Friendly	
12	31 August 2016	Aviva Stadium, Dublin, Ireland	42	Oman	4–0	4–0	Friendly	
13	4 June 2017	Aviva Stadium, Dublin, Ireland	48	Uruguay	1–0	3–1	Friendly	
14	11 June 2017	Aviva Stadium, Dublin, Ireland	49	Austria	1–1	1–1	2018 FIFA World Cup qualification	

== Honours ==
Blackburn Rovers

- FA Youth Cup runner-up: 2000–01

Hull City

- Football League One runner-up: 2004–05
- Football League Third Division runner-up: 2003–04

Stoke City

- FA Cup runner-up: 2010–11

Republic of Ireland

- Nations Cup: 2011

Individual

- Ipswich Town Player of the Year: 2007–08
- Ipswich Town Players' Player of the Year: 2007–08
- Ipswich Town Goal of the Season: 2008–09
- FAI International Football Awards – Senior International Player of the Year: 2015

== See also ==
- List of Republic of Ireland international footballers born outside the Republic of Ireland
