= Michael Jones (activist) =

American music manager and producer

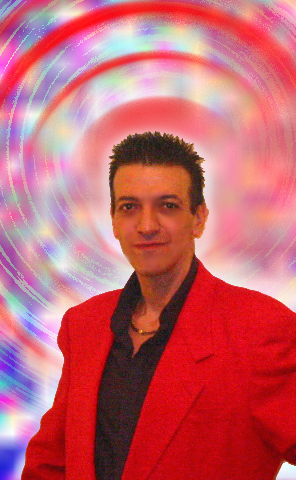
- Born: September 24, 1964 (age 61); Indianapolis, Indiana
- Occupations: Music talent manager, music producer, director, author, activist
- Known for: Music management, music producer, video director, writer, gay rights activism
- Children: 2

Michael Jones (born September 24, 1964) is an American web and application developer, music producer, and author. From 1984 to 1988, he was an activist credited with enabling the gay and lesbian community of Indianapolis to become more active and visible. During his time of advocacy in Indiana, he was involved in helping Ryan White and working to advance the rights of gays and lesbians.

== History ==
On Friday, June 26, 1984, Jones had been socializing with friends on Monument Circle in downtown Indianapolis. The area was well known as a gathering place for young gay males and had become a target for police activity. Police had been caught videotaping gays and lesbians there. That night, two plainclothes Indianapolis Police Department officers approached Jones, questioned him, frisked him and one groped his genitals. "I was searched and had my ID checked by two unidentified officers Police Department's Tactical Unit," he wrote. "After having had received 23 complaints, including mine, within just a few weeks, the ICLU moved to the center of attention, speaking out against this harassment of gays."

Jones filed a complaint against the officers and asked the Indiana Civil Liberties Union for support. His case helped spark weekly Friday night protests, called "Gay Knights on the Circle" at the landmark, beginning July 22, 1984, organized by two of the gay community's best-known leaders: Stan Berg, owner of the Body Works, a gay bathhouse in Indianapolis and publisher of the city's only gay publication, The Works; and Kathy Sarris, who presided over a gay rights organization called Justice. The protests culminated on the evening of August 31, 1984, when hundreds of gay men and lesbians gathered in a final demonstration. Dr. Bruce Voeller, then president of the Mariposa Foundation and former director of the National Gay Task Force, and Jones were among the speakers.

Jones would organize the Gay and Lesbian Rights Task Force of the Indiana Civil Liberties Union. The Task Force was formally announced on July 28, 1984.

== Ryan White and other work ==
After Jeanne White contacted Jones for help with her son Ryan White, who had been barred from attending school in Kokomo, Indiana, Jones told the Indianapolis Star, "Cases like Ryan [White]'s and Rock Hudson have brought the panic to a high point in Indiana. The more people hear, the more they are concerned and that could work two ways. I can see more being educated about AIDS, or I can see more discrimination (against AIDS victims)." Jones and the Civil Liberties Union accepted Ryan's case.

In addition to Ryan White's case, Jones worked to persuade state legislators to support a statewide gay and lesbian rights bill in Indiana's 104th General Assembly in 1985, but failed when the legislation lost its sole sponsor, State Senator Louis Mahern Jr.

Jones spent much of his tenure speaking at events throughout the state, aiming for wider acceptance of gays and lesbians and to build support for gay and lesbian rights protections. "Indiana may be conservative, but that doesn't necessarily mean people aren't going to be at least tolerant of gays. In Indiana, the situation is getting better," he told the Ball State Daily News. In a speech at Earlham College, he described homosexuals as "a chosen people—chosen by powers beyond this world to help build that society of brotherhood."

Indianapolis Star columnist Dan Carpenter wrote a tribute to Jones shortly before Jones left for Los Angeles. Citing a confrontation that occurred between Jones and a young KKK heckler in which Jones met the young man with "plain old you-and-me, eye-to-eye conversation," Carpenter wrote, "It's also illustrative of the temperament Jones brought to the unpaid job, a job he created at the age of 19 shortly after he had come out of closet as a homosexual." He continued: "All his [Jones'] trials since then—the negotiations with government officials, the protest demonstrations, the lawsuits, the legislative lobbying, the countless speeches and the struggle to help his middle-class family accept his sexual orientation–have left him not burned out but lit up... Jones has much to do with the growing militancy in the gay community here."

== Current life ==
Jones moved to Los Angeles in 1988. He served as editor of the local gay publication Edge Magazine and wrote extensively about the AIDS activist movement. In 1994, he was named editor of the national Genre Magazine.

His experimental short fiction has been published by Dennis Cooper in the anthology "Discontents." In 2011, he wrote a book about anxiety, Nothing to Fear.

Jones has also been active in the music industry, as a producer and label-owner.

He is the father of two sons and lives in Seattle, Washington. He is currently a Licensed Marriage and Family Therapist with specialties that include Obsessive-Compulsive Disorder and Panic Disorder.
