= Xavi Valero =

Spanish footballer (born 1973)

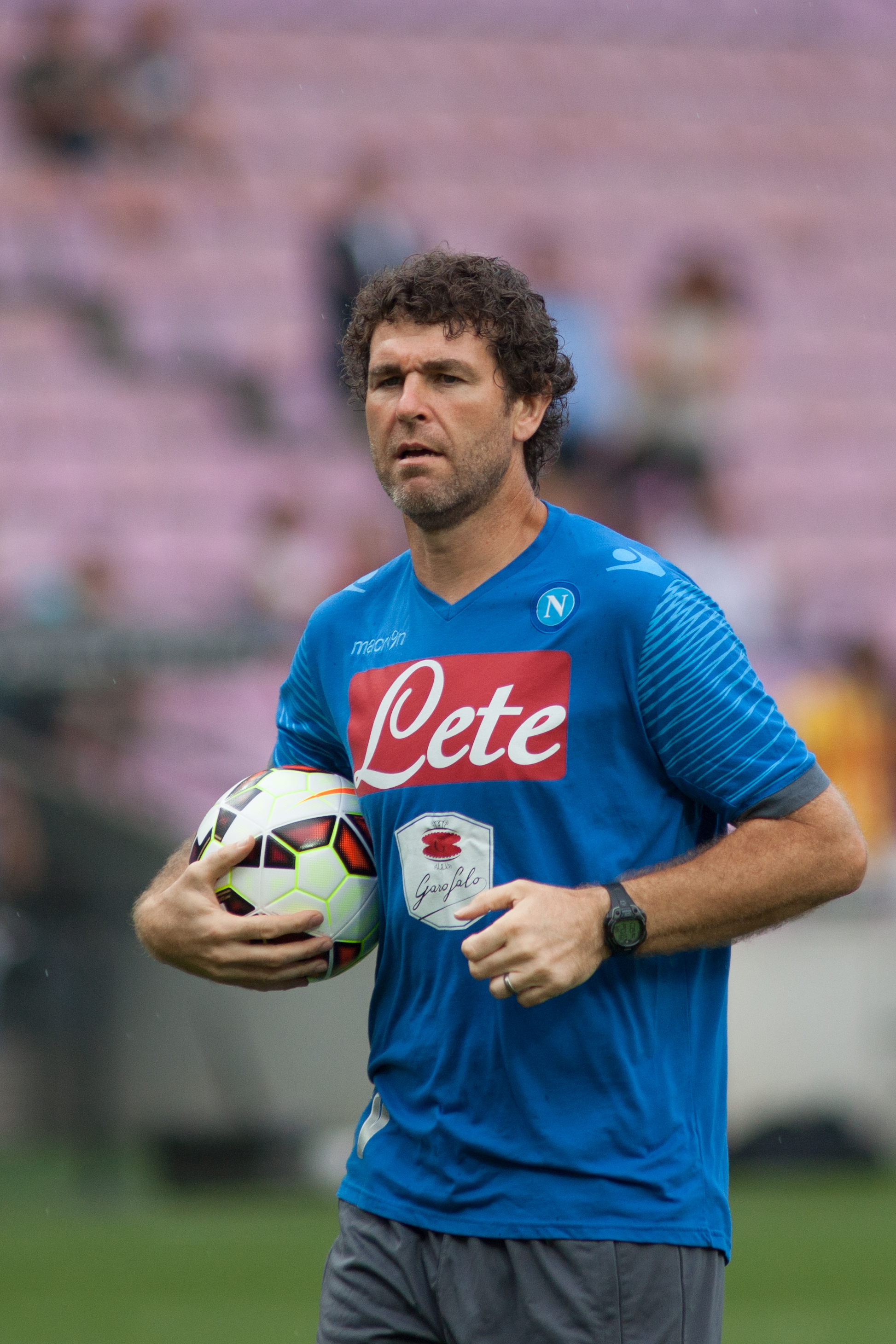
- Valero as goalkeeping coach of Napoli in 2014

Personal information
- Full name: Vicente Javier Valero Verchili
- Date of birth: 28 February 1973 (age 53)
- Place of birth: Castellón de la Plana, Spain
- Position: Goalkeeper

Team information
- Current team: Liverpool (goalkeeping coaching)

Senior career*
Years	Team	Apps	(Gls)
1995–1996	Castellón	21	(0)
1996–1997	Mallorca B	3	(0)
1997–2000	Mallorca	1	(0)
2000–2002	Logroñés	57	(0)
2002–2003	Castellón	66	(0)
2003–2004	Real Murcia	3	(0)
2004–2005	Córdoba	4	(0)
2005	Real Murcia	3	(0)
2005–2006	Wrexham	3	(0)
2006–2007	Recreativo de Huelva	2	(0)
	Gramenet	2	(0)
Total		165	(0)

Managerial career
- 2007–2010: Liverpool (goalkeeping coach)
- 2010: Inter Milan (goalkeeping coach)
- 2012–2013: Chelsea (goalkeeping coach)
- 2013–2015: Napoli (goalkeeping coach)
- 2015–2016: Real Madrid (goalkeeping coach)
- 2016–2018: Hebei (goalkeeping coach)
- 2018–2025: West Ham United (goalkeeping coach)
- 2025–2026: Liverpool (goalkeeping coach)
- * Club domestic league appearances and goals

Vicente Javier 'Xavi' Valero Verchili (Spanish pronunciation: [sˈaβi balˈeɾo]; born 28 February 1973), is a Spanish former football goalkeeper and current head of first-team goalkeeping coaching for Premier League club Liverpool.

== Football career ==
=== Player ===
Valero was born in Castellón de la Plana in the Valencian Community. He played 67 games in Segunda División, winning promotion with Mallorca (1997), Real Murcia (2003) and Recreativo de Huelva in 2006, despite not being first-choice in any of those campaigns. He also represented Córdoba in that division, and played 92 Segunda División B matches, mainly for his hometown club Castellón.

Released by Córdoba in 2004, but still training with the club, Valero moved abroad for the only time as a player in January 2005, to sign a one-month non-contract deal with Wrexham in Football League One. Manager Denis Smith signed him based on video footage. As first-choice Andy Dibble had a thigh injury, Valero made his debut on 11 January in a 2–2 draw at Peterborough United. He made two more league appearances for the Red Dragons, as well as a 2–1 win in the FAW Premier Cup quarter-finals away to Haverfordwest County on 18 January, and shared teams with compatriot striker Juan Ugarte.

=== Goalkeeping coach ===
After retiring from playing, Valero took his coaching badges, gaining a Masters in Goalkeeper Coaching from the Royal Spanish Football Federation (RFEF) and a Master of Sports Psychology UNED in Madrid.

After José Ochotorena decided to return to Spain to work with Valencia, Rafael Benítez appointed Valero head goalkeeping coach of Liverpool in July 2007. He was praised by Liverpool striker Fernando Torres as one of the biggest reasons for his goals; during training, he instructed the players on how goalkeepers in future games react to one-on-one situations.

Valero remained in Benítez's coaching staff at Inter Milan, Chelsea, Napoli and Real Madrid. In June 2018, after a spell with Hebei China Fortune, he was named as goalkeeping coach as part of Manuel Pellegrini's staff at West Ham United.

On 2 July 2025, Valero returned to reigning Premier League champions Liverpool as head of first-team goalkeeping coaching.
