= Dean Bennett =

English footballer

Personal information
- Full name: Dean Alan Bennett
- Date of birth: 13 December 1977 (age 48)
- Place of birth: Wolverhampton, England
- Height: 5 ft 10 in (1.78 m)
- Position: Centre midfielder

Team information
- Current team: Stourbridge

Youth career
- ?–1996: Aston Villa

Senior career*
Years	Team	Apps	(Gls)
1996–1997	West Bromwich Albion	1	(0)
1998–1999	Bromsgrove Rovers	?	(?)
1999–2004	Kidderminster Harriers	193	(25)
2004–2006	Wrexham	47	(2)
2006–2008	Chester City	32	(1)
2007–2008	→ Kidderminster Harriers (loan)	35	(1)
2008–2010	Kidderminster Harriers	66	(1)
2010–2011	Dundalk	48	(1)
2011–2013	Solihull Moors	?	(?)
2013–	Stourbridge	?	(?)

International career
2000	England C	1	(0)
2011	League of Ireland XI		
- * Club domestic league appearances and goals

Dean Alan Bennett (born 13 December 1977) is an English footballer who plays for Stourbridge as a midfielder.

== Career ==
Born in Wolverhampton, Bennett, who was a junior at Aston Villa, made one appearance for West Bromwich Albion while at the Hawthorns in 1996–97.

Dean was signed by Chester City from Wrexham in 2006, he has also played for Kidderminster Harriers (where he won the Conference National in 1999–2000) and Bromsgrove Rovers.

In 2004–05, Bennett was part of the Wrexham side that won the Football League Trophy against Southend United at the Millennium Stadium but his spell at the Racecourse Ground was dogged by injuries. This has continued at Chester, where he has missed the early weeks of the 2006–07 season. He scored his first goal for the club in a 1–1 draw with Torquay United. In August 2007, Bennett returned to former club Kidderminster on a three-month loan deal, and he went on to spend almost the whole campaign with the club. At the end of the season, he was released by Chester, before returning yet again to Kidderminster. Dean stayed at Kidderminster until May 2010.

Three months later Bennett made the move to Dundalk where he rejoined forces with former teammates Ian Foster and Wayne Hatswell. He made his debt at home to UCD, on 6 August. He went on to make 13 appearances in 2010. His 2011 season was disrupted by injury. Bennett scored his first competitive goal for the club with a header against Galway United in the FAI Cup at Oriel Park on 5 June.

== Honours ==
Wrexham

- Football League Trophy: 2004–05
