= Stan Berg =

Indianapolis gay rights activist

- Born: August 31, 1949; Garrett, Indiana, US
- Died: May 14, 1991 (aged 41); Indianapolis, Indiana, US
- Education: Indiana University, 1971
- Years active: 1977–1991
- Organization(s): The Body Works; Indianapolis Gay/Lesbian Coalition (IGLC)
- Notable work: The Works publication (later renamed The New Works)

Stan Berg (August 31, 1949 – May 14, 1991) was a gay rights activist, business owner, and publisher of Indianapolis-based gay press magazine, The Works.

== Early life and education ==
Stan Berg moved from Garrett to Indianapolis at the age of 14. He graduated from Indiana University Bloomington in 1971 with a degree in Business Administration. Berg chose to live publicly as a gay man following the support and affirmation of his employer after Berg was arrested at a bathhouse at the age of sixteen.

== Career ==
Berg, who originally worked in insurance, started The Body Works, a 24-hour club for the Indianapolis LGBTQ community in 1977. In 1988, Berg stated that the club had over 6,000 members.

He also started a news outlet, then named The Works, that began to share local statistics and health information about the HIV epidemic in the 1980s. The newspaper, later named New Works News had a distribution of 5,000 copies. Nevertheless, according to Berg, the paper struggled to find advertisers and lost over $1,000 per month.

Along with Kathy Sarris and others, Berg cofounded the Indianapolis Gay/Lesbian Coalition (IGLC) in 1982. He also worked to promote safe sex by distributing literature and condoms. His work on AIDS education resulted in an endorsement from an Indiana civil rights organization, Justice, Inc.

In 1984, Berg helped to create and lead the Gay Knights on the Circle to protest the Indianapolis Police Department's harassment of gay and lesbian social gatherings Monument Circle and in the city. The protests were attended by hundreds of people weekly in the summer of 1984. The protest contributed to Mayor Hudnut's commitment to preventing ant-gay bias on the police force. In 1990, Mayor Hudnut asked for Berg's help in writing a public statement to announce Indianapolis's first, public celebration of Pride Week.

== Death ==
Berg died of AIDS in 1991 in Indianapolis, aged 41.

== See also ==
- Gay Knights on the Circle
