= Danny Williams (footballer, born 1979) =

Welsh footballer

Personal information
- Full name: Daniel Ivor Llewellyn Williams
- Date of birth: 12 July 1979 (age 47)
- Place of birth: Wrexham, Wales
- Height: 6 ft 1 in (1.85 m)
- Position: Midfielder

Youth career
- ?–1997: Liverpool

Senior career*
Years	Team	Apps	(Gls)
1997–1999	Liverpool	0	(0)
1999–2001	Wrexham	40	(5)
2001	→ Doncaster Rovers (loan)	6	(0)
2001–2004	Kidderminster Harriers	119	(12)
2004	→ Chester City (loan)	5	(0)
2004	Bristol Rovers	9	(1)
2004–2008	Wrexham	126	(9)
2008–2009	Rhyl	29	(1)
2009–2010	Droylsden	9	(1)
2010–2012	Bala Town	43	(2)
2012–2013	Denbigh Town		
2013–????	Rhos Aelwyd		

International career
????–2001	Wales U21	9	(0)
- * Club domestic league appearances and goals

Daniel Ivor Llewellyn Williams (born 12 July 1979) is a Welsh former footballer and Wales under-21 international.

== Career ==
Williams was born in Wrexham and started his football career in 1997 at the age of 18 as a trainee at Liverpool. In 1999 other clubs started to have interest in Danny especially his own birthplace of Wrexham.

Wrexham signed Danny on 23 March 1999 making nearly 38 appearances. He was released in 2001 by manager Brian Flynn and joined Doncaster Rovers later that year, he stayed a month on loan until he was transferred to Kidderminster Harriers lasting three years at the club. In 2004, he made a few changes, returning north by joining Chester City on loan, who were on the verge of winning the Football Conference title.

However, Williams opted to join Bristol Rovers in March 2004, before returning to Wrexham a couple of months later after scoring once for Rovers against York City. He took part in Wrexham's Football League Trophy win in 2005.

Danny is the son-in-law of Welsh former international goalkeeper Brian Lloyd, who also played for Wrexham and Chester.

He was released by Wrexham in May 2008 following the club's relegation to the Football Conference, and joined Welsh Premier League club Rhyl.

On 18 April 2008, Rhyl became Welsh Premier League champions for the second time and Danny played a pivotal role in the run up clinching the title by making 29 appearances in the 2008–09 campaign. He scored his only goal for Rhyl in the Welsh League Cup against rivals Airbus UK Broughton with a free kick into the bottom corner of the net.

After a spell with Droylsden, Williams joined Bala Town in January 2010.

In the summer of 2012 he joined Denbigh Town.

In the summer of 2013 he joined Rhos Aelwyd.

== Honours ==
Wrexham

- Football League Trophy: 2004–05
