= Michael Jones (priest) =

Anglican priest

Michael Jones was an Anglican priest in Ireland.

Jones educated at Trinity College, Dublin. He was Archdeacon of Killala from 1625 until his death in 1719.
