= Michael Jones (English footballer) =

English footballer

Personal information
- Full name: Michael Jones
- Date of birth: 3 December 1987 (age 38)
- Place of birth: Liverpool, England
- Height: 6 ft 4 in (1.93 m)
- Position: Goalkeeper

Youth career
- 2000–2004: Wrexham

Senior career*
Years	Team	Apps	(Gls)
2004–2008	Wrexham	11	(0)
2008	→ Hinckley United (loan)	7	(0)
2008–2009	Northwich Victoria	4	(0)
2009	→ Rhyl (loan)	6	(0)
2009–2011	Hyde United	22	(0)
2016	Mold Alexandra	10	(0)
2016–2023	Cefn Druids		
2023–2024	Prestatyn Town	15	(0)
2024–2026	Llandudno	20	(0)
- * Club domestic league appearances and goals as of 07:42, 20 April 2026 (UTC)

Michael Jones (born 3 December 1987 in Liverpool, England) is an English footballer. He started his senior career at Wrexham before playing for Northwich Victoria and Hyde. He then played for a number of clubs within the Welsh league system.

== Career ==
=== Wrexham ===
Since coming through the youth ranks at Wrexham, signing scholarship forms in 2004, Jones was a backup goalkeeper to Andy Dibble, Mike Ingham and Tony Williams. He made his debut for Wrexham against Chesterfield in 2005 coming on as a substitute to replace Xavi Valero and his first start for the club came a few months later in September against Leyton Orient. Jones went on a three-month loan with Hinckley United.

=== Northwich Victoria ===
He was released by Wrexham in May 2008 following the club's relegation to the Football Conference, and joined Northwich Victoria. Where he stayed for a year making just 4 league appearances. In 2009, he joined Welsh Premier League side Rhyl on loan, making 6 league appearances before moving back to Northwich Victoria.

=== Hyde ===
In the summer of 2009 Jones was released by Northwich Victoria and signed for Hyde. He played 29 games for Hyde in his first season with them before getting a back injury to rule him out for the rest of the season.

=== Mold Alex ===
He returned to the game with Mold Alexandra in February 2016.

=== Cefn Druids ===
Following a short spell at Mold Alex, Jones signed for Cefn Druids.
