= Matt Crowell =

Welsh footballer

Personal information
- Full name: Matthew Thomas Crowell
- Date of birth: 3 July 1984 (age 42)
- Place of birth: Bridgend, Wales
- Position: Midfielder

Youth career
- –2000: Swansea City
- 2000–2002: Southampton

Senior career*
Years	Team	Apps	(Gls)
2002–2003	Southampton	0	(0)
2003–2008	Wrexham	93	(4)
2008–2009	Northwich Victoria	56	(5)
2009	Altrincham	5	(1)
2009–2010	Central Coast Mariners	13	(0)
2010	Altrincham	9	(0)
2010	Farnborough	2	(0)
2011	Port Talbot Town	4	(0)
2011–2012	CD Ourense	20	(0)
2012–2013	Port Talbot Town	24	(1)
2013–2015	CCM Academy	44	(2)
2016	Maitland FC	4	(1)
2018–2019	Central Coast United	32	(1)
Total		306	(15)

International career
2001	Wales U17	2	(0)
2002	Wales U19	3	(0)
2003–2005	Wales U21	7	(1)
- * Club domestic league appearances and goals

Matthew Thomas Crowell (born 3 July 1984) is a Welsh retired footballer who last played for NSW Premier League side Central Coast Mariners Academy.

== Club career ==
=== Southampton ===
Born in Bridgend, Crowell grew up in Coychurch. As a teenager he was part of the youth system at Swansea City before being persuaded to follow Swansea youth coach Malcolm Elias to Southampton at the age of 16 in 2000. Swansea took the case to the Football League appeals committee seeking compensation of £1.5 million. The committee later ordered Southampton to make an immediate payment of £100,000 to Swansea, as well as a further £100,000 when Crowell had made 10, 20, 30 and 40 appearances in the future and 20% of any future transfer fee that the club received for Crowell. Swansea chairman Neil McClure later stated "£500,000 is significantly more than Southampton ever offered at any stage and that must be regarded as satisfactory" However, Crowell never made a first team appearance at Southampton and was released in 2003.

=== Wrexham ===
After spending time on trial with Bristol Rovers, Crowell later joined Wrexham, having impressed in a trial spell, and made his professional debut for the club on 9 August 2003 as a substitute in place of Steve Thomas during a 0–0 draw with Chesterfield. In his third season at the Racecourse Ground he made six appearances in the club's Football League Trophy victory, beating Southend United 2–0 in the final. However, he later found himself plagued with injuries in his later years at the Racecourse Ground and, after playing on a six-month contract with the Welsh side in an attempt to show his fitness, he was released in January 2008 having made over 100 appearances for the club.

=== Non-league ===
In January 2008, Crowell signed for Northwich Victoria on non-contract terms. In July 2009, Crowell left Northwich. He attended a trial with NSW Premier League side Sydney Olympic, but later returned to Britain to sign for Altrincham on a short-term contract, stating that "It was hard at Northwich last season with the club's difficulties but I am pleased to join Altrincham".

=== Central Coast Mariners ===
In September 2009, Crowell joined A-League team Central Coast Mariners on a one-year deal until the end of the 2009–10 season. He made 13 appearances for the club before returning to England.

=== Return to Non-league ===
He then rejoined Altrincham before in December 2010 Farnborough announced that he had joined them, apparently on non-contract terms. He left the club after only two appearances.

=== Port Talbot Town ===
In May 2011, Crowell had a two-week trial with China's Chengdu Blades before he joined Welsh Premier League club Port Talbot Town in July 2011 after a trial. He played all of the club's league games prior to his next move.

=== CD Ourense ===
He signed a full-time contract with Spanish club CD Ourense in September 2011 where he made 20 appearances for the club.

=== Return to Port Talbot Town ===
In July 2012 Crowell returned to Wales and his former club Port Talbot Town ahead of the 2012/13 Welsh Premier League season. Crowell's first goal in his second spell at the club came in a 5–0 win away at Aberystwyth FC where he scored a penalty.

=== Central Coast Mariners Academy ===
In March 2013 Crowell signed for the Central Coast Mariners Academy, feeder seed for Central Coast Mariners FC of the A-League where he had a previous stint in the 2009–10 season.

=== Retirement ===
Crowell retired from professional football in August 2019

== International career ==
A former captain of the Wales under-15 side, Crowell later went on to represent Wales at under-17 and under-19 levels. He has also played numerous times for the Wales U21 side and has also scored a screamer with his left foot for the side, against Azerbaijan U21 in 2004.

== Career statistics ==
As of 2 September 2010.

Club statistics
Club	Season	League		National Cup		League Cup		Other		Total	
Club	Season	App	Goals	App	Goals	App	Goals	App	Goals	App	Goals
Wrexham	2003–04	15	1	0	0	1	0	2	0	18	1
Wrexham	2004–05	28	0	1	0	0	0	6	0	35	0
Wrexham	2005–06	29	3	0	0	0	0	0	0	29	3
Wrexham	2006–07	15	0	1	0	2	0	1	1	19	1
Wrexham	2007–08	6	0	0	0	0	0	0	0	6	0
Wrexham	Subtotal	93	4	2	0	3	0	9	1	107	5
Northwich Victoria	2007–08	15	1	0	0	0	0	0	0	15	1
Northwich Victoria	2008–09	41	4	0	0	0	0	0	0	41	4
Northwich Victoria	Subtotal	56	5	0	0	0	0	0	0	56	5
Altrincham	2009–10	5	1	0	0	0	0	0	0	5	1
Central Coast Mariners	2009–10	13	0	0	0	0	0	0	0	13	0
Altrincham	2010–11	2	0	0	0	0	0	0	0	2	0
Total		169	10	2	0	3	0	9	1	183	11

== Honours ==
Wrexham

- Football League Trophy: 2004–05
