= Mark Jones (footballer, born 1984) =

Welsh footballer (born 1984)

Personal information
- Date of birth: 15 August 1984 (age 42)
- Place of birth: Wrexham, Wales
- Position: Midfielder

Senior career*
Years	Team	Apps	(Gls)
2002–2008	Wrexham	128	(22)
2008–2009	Rochdale	9	(0)
2009–2010	Wrexham	34	(4)
2010–2017	Bala Town	188	(29)
2017–2018	Airbus UK	12	(1)
2020–????	Ruabon Rovers		

International career
2003–2006	Wales U21	5	(1)
2006–2008	Wales	2	(0)
- * Club domestic league appearances and goals

Mark Alan Jones (born 15 August 1984) is a Welsh retired footballer.

== Club career ==
=== Wrexham ===
He joined Wrexham as a trainee on 1 August 2002. He made his debut on 17 September 2002 in a 4–0 win over Exeter City, but only became an established player two seasons later. Despite being a midfielder, he was one of the club's regular goalscorers, with a ratio of 0.2 goals per game as of the end of the 2005–06 season.

Following Wrexham's relegation from League Two, Jones, who had already declared his intention to leave the club, was released at the end of the 2007–08 season.

=== Rochdale ===
After a successful trial at the club, Rochdale announced on 15 August 2008 that they were seeking international clearance to complete the signing of Jones. On 14 May 2009, it was announced that Mark Jones would leave Rochdale, along with 10 other players, after making 13 appearances for the club in all competitions.

=== Return to Wrexham ===
In June 2009, Jones returned to Wrexham, signing a one-year deal. Placed straight into the first-team on his return, Jones scored his first goal since moving back to Wrexham in a 3–0 win over Luton Town on 22 September. At the end of the year, Jones was released by Wrexham for a second time.

=== Bala Town ===
Following his release from Wrexham, Jones signed for Welsh Premier League side Bala Town. In doing so he rejected offers from other Conference National sides in order not to move away from his home and also in the hope of enjoying playing football again, stating "I'm not enjoying playing football full-time at all and have not for a few years.[...] I began playing football as a youngster for the love of it, not for money, and I want to feel that way about football again."

=== Airbus UK Broughton ===
Jones left Bala in 2017, joining Airbus UK Broughton. In his first season, he made twelve league appearances, scoring once.

=== Ruabon Rovers ===
In 2020 he joined North East Wales League team Ruabon Rovers.

== International career ==
As well as making several appearances for Wales under-21s, he has been called up to the senior Wales squad on two occasions. He made his international debut in a friendly against Liechtenstein on 14 November 2006.

Jones was named in the Wales squad ahead of more experienced players, such as Robert Earnshaw, for games against Iceland and the Netherlands in the summer of 2008.

== Statistics ==
Club Performance
Club	Season	League		FA Cup		League Cup		Other		Total
Club	Season	App	Goals	App	Goals	App	Goals	App	Goals	App	Goals
Wrexham	2002–03	1	0	0	0	0	0	0	0	1	0
Wrexham	2003–04	13	1	0	0	0	0	2	1	15	1
Wrexham	2004–05	26	3	2	0	1	0	7	1	35	4
Wrexham	2005–06	42	13	1	0	1	0	1	2	45	15
Wrexham	2006–07	30	5	2	0	2	1	1	0	35	6
Wrexham	2007–08	16	0	0	0	1	0	0	0	17	0
Wrexham	Subtotal	128	22	5	0	5	1	11	4	149	27
Rochdale	2008–09	9	0	3	0	0	0	1	0	13	0
Wrexham	2009–10	34	4	2	0	0	0	1	0	37	4
Total		171	26	10	0	5	1	13	4	199	31

== Honours ==
Wrexham

- Football League Trophy: 2004–05

Individual

- PFA Team of the Year: 2005–06 Football League Two
- Welsh Premier League Player of the Season: 2011–12
- Welsh Premier League Team of the Year: 2010–11, 2011–12, 2012–13
