= Juan Ugarte =

Spanish footballer

Personal information
- Full name: Juan Ugarte Aiestarán
- Date of birth: 7 November 1980 (age 45)
- Place of birth: San Sebastián, Spain
- Height: 1.76 m (5 ft 9 in)
- Position: Striker

Youth career
- 1991–1998: Antiguoko
- 1998–2000: Real Sociedad

Senior career*
Years	Team	Apps	(Gls)
2000–2002	Real Sociedad B	31	(11)
2001	Real Sociedad	1	(0)
2002	Eibar	1	(0)
2003	Real Unión	16	(3)
2003–2004	Barakaldo	29	(8)
2004	Dorchester Town	7	(6)
2004–2005	Wrexham	30	(16)
2005–2006	Crewe Alexandra	2	(0)
2006	→ Wrexham (loan)	2	(0)
2006–2008	Wrexham	3	(0)
Total		122	(44)
- * Club domestic league appearances and goals

Juan Ugarte Aiestarán (born 7 November 1980) is a Spanish former professional footballer who played as a striker.

== Club career ==
Born in San Sebastián, Gipuzkoa, Ugarte was brought up in local giants Real Sociedad's youth system, but only appeared once for the first team during his two-year spell as a senior. Released in 2002, he would also be very unfortunate at Basque neighbours SD Eibar – one match played in the Segunda División.

In the following years, Ugarte played with Segunda División B sides Real Unión and Barakaldo CF, also in his native region. In early 2004, after an unsuccessful trial at Wycombe Wanderers, he moved to Dorchester Town until he was acquired by Wrexham, scoring his first goal for the latter in the Football League Trophy quarter-final tie against local rivals Chester City; he finished the year as that competition's top scorer, notably netting in the final against Southend United (2–0).

Ugarte scored regularly during his time with the Welsh club, but this was not enough to avoid relegation to Football League Two after it had suffered a ten-point deduction for entering administration. On 5 March 2005, he put five past Hartlepool United in a 6–4 away win; it remained the record for most away goals scored by a single player in the English professional league for several years.

Ugarte then joined Crewe Alexandra of the Football League Championship, but injuries prevented him from ever starting a league game for them, also continuing to affect him during two loan returns to Wrexham. Despite his condition, the Dragons re-signed him in November 2006, but he only made three official appearances over two seasons, retiring at the age of 27.

== Personal life ==
Ugarte was best friends with Xabi Alonso, who also emerged through Real Sociedad's youth ranks. He went on to play for Liverpool, Real Madrid, FC Bayern Munich and the Spain national team.

== Honours ==
Wrexham

- Football League Trophy: 2004–05

Individual

- Football League One Player of the Month: March 2005
