= 2004–05 Football League Trophy =

LDV Vans Trophy

Tournament details
- Country: England; Wales
- Teams: 60

Final positions
- Champions: Wrexham
- Runners-up: Southend United

Tournament statistics
- Matches played: 61
- Goals scored: 175 (2.87 per match)
- Top goal scorer(s): Juan Ugarte (6 goals)

The 2004–05 Football League Trophy, known as the LDV Vans Trophy for sponsorship reasons, was the 24th season in the history of the competition. A straight knockout competition for English football clubs in the third and fourth tiers of the English football league system.

In all, 60 clubs entered the competition. It was split into two sections, Northern and Southern, with the winners of each section contesting the final at the Millennium Stadium, Cardiff. The competition began on 28 September 2004 and concluded on 10 April 2005.

Blackpool were the defending champions, but lost to Hereford United in the quarter-finals.

The winners were Wrexham, who defeated Southend United 2–0.

== First round ==
The First Round ties took place on 28 and 29 September 2004. Four clubs received a bye into the Second Round. Oldham Athletic and Tranmere Rovers in the Northern section, and Northampton Town and Swindon Town in the Southern section.

=== Northern section ===
Tie no.	Home team	Score	Away team	Attendance
1	Carlisle United	2–1	Grimsby Town	2,580
2	Hartlepool United	3–3	Hull City	1,535
Hartlepool United won 4–1 on penalties
3	Hereford United	1–1	Scunthorpe United	1,414
Hereford United won 4–3 on penalties
4	Huddersfield Town	3–0	Morecambe	3,831
5	Lincoln City	0–1	Doncaster Rovers	1,875
6	Macclesfield Town	2–1	Chesterfield	813
7	Mansfield	0–0	Darlington	1,651
Mansfield Town won 4–3 on penalties
8	Notts County	2–3	Wrexham	1,359
9	Port Vale	1–0	Barnsley	1,970
10	Rochdale	4–1	Scarborough	837
11	Stockport County	3–1	Bury	1,416
12	Bradford City	1–2	Accrington Stanley	1,868
13	Sheffield Wednesday	1–2	Chester City	7,640
14	York City	0–2	Blackpool	1,072

=== Southern section ===
Tie no.	Home team	Score	Away team	Attendance
1	Aldershot Town	0–1	Wycombe Wanderers	1,632
2	Barnet	3–1	Stevenage Borough	1,337
3	Brentford	0–3	MK Dons	1,679
4	Bristol Rovers	1–0	Kidderminster Harriers	3,281
5	Cheltenham Town	5–1	Dagenham & Redbridge	1,048
6	Shrewsbury Town	3–2	Bournemouth	1,278
7	Swansea City	2–0	Luton Town	3,559
8	Torquay United	4–3	Yeovil Town	1,610
9	Walsall	1–0	Rushden & Diamonds	2,987
10	Woking	0–3	Leyton Orient	1,166
11	Boston United	0–1	Cambridge United	1,489
12	Bristol City	1–0	Peterborough United	3,092
13	Colchester United	1–1	Southend United	3,469
Southend United won 5–3 on penalties
14	Oxford United	2–2	Exeter City	1,842
Exeter City won 3–1 on penalties

== Second round ==
The Second Round ties took place on 2 and 3 November 2004.

=== Northern section ===
Tie no.	Home team	Score	Away team	Attendance
1	Blackpool	6–3	Huddersfield Town	3,533
2	Carlisle United	0–1	Hartlepool United	2,871
3	Chester City	1–0	Rochdale	1,419
4	Hereford United	1–1	Doncaster Rovers	1,375
Hereford United won 3–1 on penalties
5	Macclesfield Town	4–0	Mansfield Town	1,027
6	Oldham Athletic	3–2	Accrington Stanley	2,812
7	Tranmere Rovers	2–1	Port Vale	3,735
8	Wrexham	2–0	Stockport County	2,130

=== Southern section ===
Tie no.	Home team	Score	Away team	Attendance
1	Bristol City	2–1	MK Dons	3,367
2	Cambridge United	0–2	Leyton Orient	1,812
3	Cheltenham Town	2–2	Walsall	2,042
Walsall won 4–3 on penalties
4	Exeter City	1–2	Swindon Town	1,898
5	Southend United	4–1	Shrewsbury Town	2,599
6	Torquay United	1–3	Northampton Town	1,395
7	Wycombe Wanderers	1–0	Swansea City	1,021
8	Bristol Rovers	2–0	Barnet	4,460

== Quarter finals ==
The Quarter final ties took place on 30 November 2004.

=== Northern section ===
Tie no.	Home team	Score	Away team	Attendance
1	Chester City	0–1	Wrexham	5,028
2	Hereford United	2–1	Blackpool	2,181
3	Macclesfield Town	0–1	Tranmere Rovers	1,609
4	Oldham Athletic	3–1	Hartlepool United	2,835

=== Southern section ===
Tie no.	Home team	Score	Away team	Attendance
1	Bristol Rovers	1–0	Wycombe Wanderers	3,667
2	Leyton Orient	1–0	Walsall	1,452
3	Northampton Town	0–2	Southend United	3,280
4	Swindon Town	1–0	Bristol City	7,571

== Semi finals ==
The Semi final ties took place on 25 January 2005.

=== Northern section ===
Tie no.	Home team	Score	Away team	Attendance
1	Hereford United	1–2	Wrexham	2,710
2	Oldham Athletic	1–1	Tranmere Rovers	4,069
Oldham Athletic won 5–4 on penalties

=== Southern section ===
Tie no.	Home team	Score	Away team	Attendance
1	Leyton Orient	1–2	Bristol Rovers	1,846
2	Southend United	2–0	Swindon Town	4,270

== Area Finals ==
=== Northern section ===
2005-02-15
19:45
First leg

Oldham Athletic	3–5	Wrexham
Vernon 35', 83' (pen.); Eyres 76'	Report	Ugarte 29', 55', 62'; Jones 32'; Ferguson 58'

Boundary Park, Oldham
Attendance: 4,881
Referee: C. Webster

2005-03-08
19:45
Second leg

Wrexham	1–0	Oldham Athletic
Llewellyn 65'	Report	Branston (red card) 60'

Racecourse Ground, Wrexham
Attendance: 5,814
Referee: G. Laws

=== Southern Section ===
2005-02-15
19:45
First leg

Bristol Rovers	1–2	Southend United
Walker 56'	Report	Dudfield 8'; Gower 67'

Memorial Stadium, Bristol
Attendance: 7,110
Referee: R. Beeby

2005-03-08
19:45
Second leg

Southend United	2–2	Bristol Rovers
Gray 30'; Eastwood 61'	Report	Walker 44'; Agogo 73'

Roots Hall, Southend-on-Sea
Attendance: 8,145
Referee: P. Crossley

== Final ==
2005-04-10
13:00

Southend United	0–2 (a.e.t.)	Wrexham
	Report	Ugarte 99'; Ferguson 118'

Millennium Stadium, Cardiff
Attendance: 36,216
Referee: B. Curson
