= List of Welsh Cup finals =

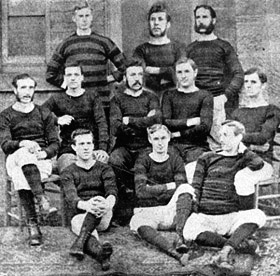
The Wrexham team which won the first Welsh Cup in 1878. The team are pictured without the trophy, as it was not ready until a year later.

The Football Association of Wales Challenge Cup, commonly known as the Welsh Cup, is a knockout cup competition in Welsh football, organised by the Football Association of Wales (the FAW). It is the third-oldest association football competition in the world, behind only its English and Scottish equivalents, having begun in 1877. The tournament is open to any men's football team in Wales; however, the club's ground must meet certain requirements laid out by the FAW prior to entering. Welsh clubs playing within the English football league system have been excluded from entering the tournament since 1995, a few years after the creation of the League of Wales, when UEFA decreed that the winner of the competition could not compete in the Cup Winners' Cup unless the sides were barred from entering. This prohibition currently affects five clubs: Cardiff City, Merthyr Town, Newport County, Swansea City and Wrexham. During its history, the competition has allowed some English clubs close to Wales to enter the tournament and has been won on 21 occasions by teams based outside Wales' borders.

As of 2026, the record for the most wins is held by Wrexham, who have won the competition on 23 occasions, their last victory coming in 1995. Apart from Wrexham, only Cardiff City, Swansea City and The New Saints have won the competition on 10 or more occasions, having won 22, 10 and 10 respectively. The New Saints hold the record for the most times an English team has won the Cup, having claimed victory on ten occasions, the last of which in 2024–25.

== History ==
The Welsh Cup was founded by the Football Association of Wales in 1877, staging the first competition for the 1877–88 season. The first final was played on 30 March 1878 and was won by Wrexham who defeated Druids 1–0, Jas Davies scoring the first Welsh Cup final goal for the Dragons. Despite their defeat, amateur side Druids, who had become the first Welsh side to enter the English FA Cup the year before only to withdraw without playing a match, dominated the early stagings of the competition, featuring in eight of the first ten finals, winning five. However, the dawn of fully professional football clubs eventually proved too strong for the side who reached their last final in 1901.

Although the competition was introduced for Welsh clubs, English clubs close to the border were also allowed to enter and Shropshire based Oswestry Town and Cheshire based Northwich Victoria both participated in the inaugural season in 1877–88, the final for the 1878–79 tournament the following year also being held in Oswestry. In its early stages, the competition was dominated by teams from the northern area of Wales with Wrexham, Druids, Chirk and Newtown White Stars claiming multiple titles each by the turn of the century as well as other northern based sides Bangor and Aberystywth Town also claiming victories. It was not until 1903 that a Welsh side from the south of the country reached the final, by which time the competition had even been won on four occasions by English sides, when Aberaman Athletic reached the final but suffered an 8–0 defeat to Wrexham, a result that still stands as the biggest victory in a Welsh Cup final. It would take a further 9 years for a southern side to win the cup, Cardiff City claiming the title after defeating Pontypridd 3–0 in a replay in 1912. The tie was also the first time that the final had been played in the south of Wales.

During the 1960s, the competition gained new interest when the winner was handed a place in the qualifying rounds of the European Cup Winners' Cup. This gave amateur Welsh league sides and the Welsh sides playing in the lower levels of the Football League the chance to compete in European competitions and the tournament was subsequently dominated by the fully professional Football League sides Cardiff City, Swansea City and Wrexham who were keen on reaching the Cup Winners' Cup for lucrative ties against European sides. English sides who won the tournament were barred from claiming the European place due to their location so the spot would be handed to the highest placed finishing Welsh sides in their stead. In 1995, the six Welsh clubs playing within the English football league system, Cardiff City, Colwyn Bay, Merthyr Tydfil, Newport County, Swansea City and Wrexham were barred from entering the competition by the FAW after pressure from governing body UEFA,. after rejecting a transfer into the newly formed League of Wales.

In 2012, the six clubs were invited back into the competition, although only Merthyr, Newport and Wrexham accepted the invitation, and competed in the 2011–12 season. In order to attract the other three teams into the competition, the FAW hoped to allow the sides to be eligible for European competition again but UEFA rules only allow teams to qualify for European tournaments via the competitions of one national association, requiring the sides to not enter the FA Cup or EFL Cup and give up eligibility to qualify through the English leagues. However, the appeal was rejected by UEFA and the following season the six clubs were not invited to enter the Welsh Cup.

== Finals ==
Until 1961, a draw in the final would lead to a replay in order to decide a winner. Between the 1961–62 and 1984–85 seasons, the final was played as a two-legged match, originally on a points basis rather than aggregate score, going to a third play-off match if required. In the 1985–86 season, it reverted to a single game, with the result to be decided by a replay in the event of a draw. In the 1987–88 season, the final reverted to a single game, with the result to be decided on the day by extra time and a penalty shoot-out as necessary. The competition was not held between 1915–1919 and 1940–1945 due to the first and second world wars when competitive football was suspended.

All teams are Welsh, except where marked (England).

=== Results ===
Season	Winner	Score	Runner-up	Venue	Attendance
1877–78	Wrexham	1–0	Druids	Acton Park Wrexham	1,500
1878–79	Newtown White Stars	1–0	Wrexham	the Cricket Field, Oswestry	2,500
1879–80	Druids	2–1	Ruthin	Racecourse Ground, Wrexham	4,000
1880–81	Druids	2–0	Newtown White Stars	Racecourse Ground, Wrexham	4,000
1881–82	Druids	5–0	(England) Northwich Victoria	Racecourse Ground, Wrexham	2,000
1882–83	Wrexham	1–0	Druids	Racecourse Ground, Wrexham	2,000
1883–84	(England) Oswestry	0–0	Druids	Racecourse Ground, Wrexham	2,000
Replay	(England) Oswestry	1–0	Druids	Racecourse Ground, Wrexham	3,000
1884–85	Druids	1–1	(England) Oswestry	Racecourse Ground, Wrexham	2,000
Replay	Druids	3–1^{(a.e.t)}	(England) Oswestry	Racecourse Ground, Wrexham	2,000
1885–86	Druids	4–0	Newtown	Racecourse Ground, Wrexham	3,000
1886–87	Chirk AAA	2–1	(England) Davenham	Alexandra Recreation Ground, Crewe	1,500
1887–88	Chirk AAA	5–0	Newtown	Owen's Field, Chester Road, Wrexham	3,000
1888–89	Bangor	2–1	(England) Northwich Victoria	Racecourse Ground, Wrexham	4,000
1889–90	Chirk AAA	1–0	Wrexham	Racecourse Ground, Wrexham	3,500
1890–91	(England) Shrewsbury Town	5–2	Wrexham	the Cricket Field, Oswestry	3,000
1891–92	Chirk AAA	2–1	Westminster Rovers	Wrexham Racecourse, Wrexham	4,000
1892–93	Wrexham	2–1	Chirk AAA	the Cricket Field, Oswestry	5,000
1893–94	Chirk AAA	2–0	Westminster Rovers	Wynnstay Park, Ruabon	3,000
1894–95	Newtown	3–2	Wrexham	Recreation Field, Welshpool	5,000
1895–96	Bangor	3–1	Wrexham	Council Field, Llandudno	7,000
1896–97	Wrexham	2–0	Newtown	the Cricket Field, Oswestry	6,000
1897–98	Druids	1–1	Wrexham	the Cricket Field, Oswestry	4,500
Replay	Druids	2–1	Wrexham	the Cricket Field, Oswestry	1,500
1898–99	Druids	2–2	Wrexham	Hand Field, Chirk	4,000
Replay	Druids	1–0	Wrexham	Hand Field, Chirk	3,500
1899–1900	Aberystwyth	3–0	Druids	the Cunnings, Newtown	3,000
1900–01	(England) Oswestry United	1–0	Druids	Racecourse Ground, Wrexham	7,000
1901–02	(England) Wellington Town	1–0	Wrexham	Racecourse Ground, Wrexham	6,000
1902–03	Wrexham	8–0	Aberaman Athletic	Racecourse Ground, Wrexham	5,500
1903–04	Druids	3–2	Aberdare Athletic	Racecourse Ground, Wrexham	6,500
1904–05	Wrexham	3–0	Aberdare Athletic	Racecourse Ground, Wrexham	6,191
1905–06	(England) Wellington Town	3–2	(England) Whitchurch	Racecourse Ground, Wrexham	4,000
1906–07	(England) Oswestry United	2–0	(England) Whitchurch	Racecourse Ground, Wrexham	6,000
1907–08	(England) Chester	3–1	Connah's Quay & Shotton	Racecourse Ground, Wrexham	8,000
1908–09	Wrexham	1–0	(England) Chester	Racecourse Ground, Wrexham	9,000
1909–10	Wrexham	2–1	(England) Chester	Racecourse Ground, Wrexham	10,000
1910–11	Wrexham	6–0	Connah's Quay & Shotton	Racecourse Ground, Wrexham	3,000
1911–12	Cardiff City	0–0	Pontypridd	Ninian Park, Cardiff	14,000
Replay	Cardiff City	3–0	Pontypridd	Ynys Field, Aberdare	7,000
1912–13	Swansea Town	0–0	Pontypridd	Ninian Park, Cardiff	9,000
Replay	Swansea Town	1–0	Pontypridd	Mid-Rhondda Ground, Tonypandy	8,319
1913–14	Llanelli	0–0	Wrexham	Vetch Field, Swansea	15,000
Replay	Wrexham	3–0	Llanelli	the Cricket Field, Oswestry	3,639
1914–15	Wrexham	1–1	Swansea Town	Racecourse Ground, Wrexham	6,000
Replay	Wrexham	1–0	Swansea Town	Ninian Park, Cardiff	4,000
1919–20	Cardiff City	2–1	Wrexham	Racecourse Ground, Wrexham	6,618
1920–21	Pontypridd	1–1	Wrexham	Ninian Park, Cardiff	7,000
Replay	Wrexham	3–1	Pontypridd	Gay Meadow, Shrewsbury	8,000
1921–22	Cardiff City	2–0	Ton Pentre	Taff Vale Park, Pontypridd	8,000
1922–23	Cardiff City	3–2	Aberdare Athletic	Vetch Field, Swansea	8,000
1923–24	Merthyr Town	2–2	Wrexham	Taff Vale Park, Pontypridd	4,500
Replay	Wrexham	1–0	Merthyr Town	Racecourse Ground, Wrexham	8,000
1924–25	Wrexham	3–1	Fflint	Racecourse Ground, Wrexham	6,565
1925–26	Ebbw Vale	3–2	Swansea Town	Welfare Ground, Ebbw Vale	2,500
1926–27	Cardiff City	2–0	Rhyl Athletic	Racecourse Ground, Wrexham	9,690
1927–28	Cardiff City	2–0	Bangor Athletic	Farrar Road, Bangor	12,000
1928–29	Connah's Quay & Shotton	3–0	Cardiff City	Racecourse Ground, Wrexham	9,623
1929–30	Cardiff City	0–0^{(a.e.t)}	Rhyl Athletic	Gay Meadow, Shrewsbury	5,892
Replay	Cardiff City	4–2	Rhyl	Racecourse Ground, Wrexham	7,000
1930–31	Wrexham	7–0	(England) Shrewsbury Town	Racecourse Ground, Wrexham	8,868
1931–32	Wrexham	1–1	Swansea Town	Racecourse Ground, Wrexham	8,300
Replay	Swansea Town	2–0	Wrexham	Vetch Field, Swansea	5,000
1932–33	(England) Chester	2–0	Wrexham	Sealand Road, Chester	15,000
1933–34	(England) Bristol City	1–1	(England) Tranmere Rovers	Racecourse Ground, Wrexham	4,922
Replay	(England) Bristol City	3–0	(England) Tranmere Rovers	Sealand Road, Chester	4,000
1934–35	(England) Tranmere Rovers	1–0	(England) Chester	Sealand Road, Chester	10,000
1935–36	(England) Crewe Alexandra	2–0	(England) Chester	Racecourse Ground, Wrexham	6,807
1936–37	(England) Crewe Alexandra	1–1	Rhyl Athletic	Sealand Road, Chester	Unknown
Replay	(England) Crewe Alexandra	3–1	Rhyl	Sealand Road, Chester	Unknown
1937–38	(England) Shrewsbury Town	2–2	Swansea Town	Gay Meadow, Shrewsbury	14,500
Replay	(England) Shrewsbury Town	2–1	Swansea Town	Gay Meadow, Shrewsbury	8,000
1938–39	(England) South Liverpool	2–1	Cardiff City	Racecourse Ground, Wrexham	5,000
1939–40	(England) Wellington Town	4–0	Swansea Town	Gay Meadow, Shrewsbury	6,000
1946–47	(England) Chester	0–0	Merthyr Tydfil	Ninian Park, Cardiff	27,000
Replay	(England) Chester	5–1	Merthyr Tydfil	Racecourse Ground, Wrexham	11,190
1947–48	Lovell's Athletic	3–0	(England) Shrewsbury Town	Racecourse Ground, Wrexham	10,000
1948–49	Merthyr Tydfil	2–0	Swansea Town	Ninian Park, Cardiff	35,000
1949–50	Swansea Town	4–1	Wrexham	Ninian Park, Cardiff	12,000
1950–51	Merthyr Tydfil	1–1	Cardiff City	Vetch Field, Swansea	12,000
Replay	Merthyr Tydfil	3–2	Cardiff City	Vetch Field, Swansea	18,000
1951–52	Rhyl	4–3	Merthyr Tydfil	Ninian Park, Cardiff	10,000
1952–53	Rhyl	2–1	(England) Chester City	Farrar Road, Bangor	8,500
1953–54	Fflint Town United	2–0	(England) Chester	Racecourse Ground, Wrexham	15,584
1954–55	(England) Chester	1–1	Barry Town	Racecourse Ground, Wrexham	6,766
Replay	Barry Town	4–3	(England) Chester	Ninian Park, Cardiff	8,450
1955–56	Cardiff City	3–2	Swansea Town	Ninian Park, Cardiff	37,500
1956–57	Wrexham	2–1	Swansea Town	Ninian Park, Cardiff	10,000
1957–58	(England) Chester	1–1	Wrexham	Sealand Road, Chester	7,742
Replay	Wrexham	2–1	(England) Chester	Racecourse Ground, Wrexham	7,542
1958–59	Cardiff City	2–0	Lovell's Athletic	Somerton Park, Newport	Unknown
1959–60	Cardiff City	1–1	Wrexham	Ninian Park, Cardiff	
Replay	Wrexham	1–0	Cardiff	Racecourse Ground, Wrexham	11,172
1960–61	Swansea Town	3–1	Bangor City	Ninian Park, Cardiff	5,938
Season	Home team	Score	Away team	Venue	Attendance
1961–62	Wrexham	3–0	Bangor City	Racecourse Ground, Wrexham	7,638
2nd Leg	Bangor City	2–0	Wrexham	Farrar Road, Bangor	7,500
Play-off	Bangor City	3–1	Wrexham	Belle Vue, Rhyl	12,000
1962–63	Borough United	2–1	Newport County	Nant-y-Coed, Llandudno Junction	3,500
2nd Leg	Newport County	0–0	Borough United	Somerton Park, Newport	5,000
1963–64	Bangor City	2–0	Cardiff City	Farrar Road, Bangor	8,500
2nd Leg	Cardiff City	3–1	Bangor City	Ninian Park, Cardiff	9,050
Play-off	Cardiff City	2–0	Bangor City	Racecourse Ground, Wrexham	10,014
1964–65	Cardiff City	5–1	Wrexham	Ninian Park, Cardiff	7,412
2nd Leg	Wrexham	1–0	Cardiff City	Racecourse Ground, Wrexham	8,000
Play-off	Cardiff City	3–0	Wrexham	Gay Meadow, Shrewsbury	7,480
1965–66	Swansea Town	3–0	(England) Chester	Vetch Field, Swansea	9,614
2nd Leg	(England) Chester	1–0	Swansea Town	Sealand Road, Chester	6,346
Play-off	(England) Chester	1–2	Swansea Town	Sealand Road, Chester	6,276
1966–67	Wrexham	2–2	Cardiff City	Racecourse Ground, Wrexham	11,473
2nd Leg	Cardiff City	2–1	Wrexham	Ninian Park, Cardiff	8,299
1967–68	(England) Hereford United	0–2	Cardiff City	Edgar Street, Hereford	5,422
2nd Leg	Cardiff City	4–1	(England) Hereford United	Ninian Park, Cardiff	6,036
1968–69	Swansea City	1–3	Cardiff City	Vetch Field, Swansea	10,207
2nd Leg	Cardiff City	2–0	Swansea City	Ninian Park, Cardiff	12,617
1969–70	(England) Chester	0–1	Cardiff City	Sealand Road, Chester	3,087
2nd Leg	Cardiff City	4–0	(England) Chester	Ninian Park, Cardiff	5,567
1970–71	Wrexham	0–1	Cardiff City	Racecourse Ground, Wrexham	14,101
2nd Leg	Cardiff City	3–1	Wrexham	Ninian Park, Cardiff	7,000
1971–72	Wrexham	2–1	Cardiff City	Racecourse Ground, Wrexham	6,984
2nd Leg	Cardiff City	1–1	Wrexham	Ninian Park, Cardiff	6,508
1972–73	Bangor City	1–0	Cardiff City	Farrar Road, Bangor	5,005
2nd Leg	Cardiff City	5–0	Bangor City	Ninian Park, Cardiff	4,679
1973–74	(England) Stourbridge	0–1	Cardiff City	War Memorial Athletic Ground, Amblecote	5,726
2nd Leg	Cardiff City	1–0	(England) Stourbridge	Ninian Park, Cardiff	4,000
1974–75	Wrexham	2–1	Cardiff City	Racecourse Ground, Wrexham	6,862
2nd Leg	Cardiff City	1–3	Wrexham	Ninian Park, Cardiff	3,280
1975–76	(England) Hereford United	3–3	Cardiff City	Edgar Street, Hereford	3,709
2nd Leg	Cardiff City	3–2	(England) Hereford United	Ninian Park, Cardiff	2,648
1976–77	Cardiff City	2–1	(England) Shrewsbury Town	Ninian Park, Cardiff	3,178
2nd Leg	(England) Shrewsbury Town	3–0	Cardiff City	Gay Meadow, Shrewsbury	2,907
1977–78	Bangor City	1–2	Wrexham	Farrar Road, Bangor	10,000
2nd Leg	Wrexham	1–0	Bangor City	Racecourse Ground, Wrexham	13,959
1978–79	Wrexham	1–1	(England) Shrewsbury Town	Racecourse Ground, Wrexham	6,174
2nd Leg	(England) Shrewsbury Town	1–0	Wrexham	Gay Meadow, Shrewsbury	8,889
1979–80	Newport County	2–1	(England) Shrewsbury Town	Somerton Park, Newport	9,950
2nd Leg	(England) Shrewsbury Town	0–3	Newport County	Gay Meadow, Shrewsbury	8,993
1980–81	Swansea City	1–0	(England) Hereford United	Vetch Field, Swansea	13,182
2nd Leg	(England) Hereford United	1–1	Swansea City	Edgar Street, Hereford	7,038
1981–82	Cardiff City	0–0	Swansea City	Ninian Park, Cardiff	11,960
2nd Leg	Swansea City	2–1	Cardiff City	Vetch Field, Swansea	15,828
1982–83	Wrexham	1–2	Swansea City	Racecourse Ground, Wrexham	2,295
2nd Leg	Swansea City	2–0	Wrexham	Vetch Field, Swansea	5,630
1983–84	(England) Shrewsbury Town	2–1	Wrexham	Gay Meadow, Shrewsbury	2,607
2nd Leg	Wrexham	0–0	(England) Shrewsbury Town	Racecourse Ground, Wrexham	3,148
1984–85	(England) Shrewsbury Town	3–1	Bangor City	Gay Meadow, Shrewsbury	1,507
2nd Leg	Bangor City	0–2	(England) Shrewsbury Town	Farrar Road, Bangor	1,800
Season	Winner	Score	Runner-up	Venue	Attendance
1985–86	Wrexham	1–1	(England) Kidderminster Harriers	Racecourse Ground, Wrexham	5,035
Replay	(England) Kidderminster Harriers	1–2	Wrexham	Aggborough, Kidderminster	4,304
1986–87	Merthyr Tydfil	2–2	Newport County	Ninian Park, Cardiff	7,000
Replay	Merthyr Tydfil	1–0	Newport County	Ninian Park, Cardiff	6,010
1987–88	Cardiff City	2–0	Wrexham	Vetch Field, Swansea	5,465
1988–89	Swansea City	5–0	(England) Kidderminster Harriers	Vetch Field, Swansea	5,100
1989–90	(England) Hereford United	2–1	Wrexham	National Stadium, Cardiff	4,182
1990–91	Swansea City	2–0	Wrexham	National Stadium, Cardiff	5,000
1991–92	Cardiff City	1–0	(England) Hednesford Town	National Stadium, Cardiff	10,300
1992–93	Cardiff City	5–0	Rhyl	National Stadium, Cardiff	16,443
1993–94	Barry Town	2–1	Cardiff City	National Stadium, Cardiff	14,500
1994–95	Wrexham	2–1	Cardiff City	National Stadium, Cardiff	11,200
1995–96	Llansantffraid	3–3^{(a.e.t)}^{P}	Barry Town	National Stadium, Cardiff	2,666
1996–97	Barry Town	2–1	Cwmbran Town	Ninian Park, Cardiff	1,560
1997–98	Bangor City	1–1^{(a.e.t)}^{P}	Connah's Quay Nomads	Racecourse Ground, Wrexham	2,023
1998–99	Inter Cable-Tel	1–1^{(a.e.t)}^{P}	Carmarthen Town	Penydarren Park, Merthyr Tydfil	1,100
1999–2000	Bangor City	1–0	Cwmbran Town	Racecourse Ground, Wrexham	1,125
2000–01	Barry Town	2–0	Total Network Solutions	Racecourse Ground, Wrexham	1,022
2001–02	Barry Town	4–1	Bangor City	Park Avenue, Aberystwyth	2,256
2002–03	Barry Town	2–2^{(a.e.t)}^{P}	Cwmbran Town	Stebonheath Park, Llanelli	852
2003–04	Rhyl	1–0^{(a.e.t)}	Total Network Solutions	Latham Park, Newtown	1,534
2004–05	Total Network Solutions	1–0	Carmarthen Town	Stebonheath Park, Llanelli	1,126
2005–06	Rhyl	2–0	Bangor City	Racecourse Ground, Wrexham	1,743
2006–07	Carmarthen Town	3–2	Afan Lido	Stebonheath Park, Llanelli	946
2007–08	Bangor City	4–2^{(a.e.t)}	Llanelli	Latham Park, Newtown	1,510
2008–09	Bangor City	2–0	Aberystwyth Town	Parc y Scarlets, Llanelli	1,044
2009–10	Bangor City	3–2	Port Talbot Town	Parc y Scarlets, Llanelli	1,303
2010–11	Llanelli	4–1	Bangor City	Parc y Scarlets, Llanelli	1,719
2011–12	The New Saints	2–0	Cefn Druids	Nantporth Stadium, Bangor	731
2012–13	Prestatyn Town	3–1^{(a.e.t)}	Bangor City	Racecourse Ground, Wrexham	1,732
2013–14	The New Saints	3–2	Aberystwyth Town	Racecourse Ground, Wrexham	1,273
2014–15	The New Saints	2–0	Newtown	Latham Park, Newtown	1,579
2015–16	The New Saints	2–0	Airbus UK Broughton	Racecourse Ground, Wrexham	1,402
2016–17	Bala Town	2–1	The New Saints	Bangor University Stadium, Bangor	1,110
2017–18	Connah's Quay Nomads	4–1	Aberystwyth Town	Latham Park, Newtown	1,455
2018–19	The New Saints	3–0	Connah's Quay Nomads	The Rock, Wrexham	1,256
2019–20	Cancelled due to COVID-19 pandemic				
2020–21	Cancelled due to COVID-19 pandemic				
2021–22	The New Saints	3–2	Penybont	Cardiff City Stadium, Cardiff	2,417
2022–23	The New Saints	6–0	Bala Town	Bangor University Stadium, Bangor	1,231
2023–24	Connah's Quay Nomads	2–1	The New Saints	Rodney Parade, Newport	1,246
2024–25	The New Saints	2–1	Connah's Quay Nomads	Rodney Parade, Newport	1,313
2025–26	Caernarfon Town	3–0	Flint Town United	Rodney Parade, Newport	2,224

Notes:

- ^{P} indicates won on penalties

== Results by team ==
Results by team
Club	Wins	First final won	Last final won	Runners-up
Wrexham	23	1878	1995	22
Cardiff City	22	1912	1993	10
Swansea City (Note: Swansea City were founded under the name Swansea Town before changing their name in 1969 when Swansea was granted city status.)	10	1913	1991	8
The New Saints (Note: Includes results under the teams former names, Total Network Solutions and Llansantffraid.)	10	1996	2025	4
Bangor City (Note: Includes results under the teams former name Bangor.)	8	1889	2010	10
Druids	8	1880	1904	5
Shrewsbury Town	6	1891	1985	3
Barry Town	6	1955	2003	1
Chirk AAA	5	1887	1894	1
Rhyl	4	1952	2006	4
Chester City (Note: Includes results under the teams former name, Chester)	3	1908	1933	10
Merthyr Tydfil	3	1949	1987	2
Wellington Town (Note: Wellington Town later changed their club name to Telford United in 1969.)	3	1902	1940	0
Newtown (Note: Includes results under the teams former name Newtown White Stars.)	2	1879	1895	5
Connah's Quay Nomads	2	2018	2024	3
Crewe Alexandra	2	1936	1937	0
Oswestry United	2	1901	1907	0
Hereford United	1	1990	1990	3
Aberystwyth Town	1	1900	1900	3
Carmarthen Town	1	2007	2007	2
Connah's Quay & Shotton	1	1929	1929	2
Llanelli	1	2011	2011	2
Newport County	1	1980	1980	2
Flint Town United (Note: Includes results under the teams former name Flint Town.)	1	1954	1954	2
Lovell's Athletic	1	1948	1948	1
Oswestry	1	1884	1884	1
Tranmere Rovers	1	1935	1935	1
Bala Town	1	2017	2017	1
Borough United	1	1963	1963	0
Bristol City	1	1934	1934	0
Caernarfon Town	1	2026	2026	0
Ebbw Vale	1	1926	1926	0
Inter CableTel	1	1999	1999	0
Prestatyn Town	1	2013	2013	0
South Liverpool	1	1939	1939	0
Aberdare Athletic	0	—	—	3
Cwmbran Town	0	—	—	3
Pontypridd	0	—	—	3
Kidderminster Harriers	0	—	—	2
Northwich Victoria	0	—	—	2
Westminster Rovers	0	—	—	2
Whitchurch	0	—	—	2
Aberaman Athletic	0	—	—	1
Afan Lido	0	—	—	1
Airbus UK Broughton	0	—	—	1
Cefn Druids	0	—	—	1
Davenham	0	—	—	1
Hednesford Town	0	—	—	1
Merthyr Town	0	—	—	1
Port Talbot Town	0	—	—	1
Ruthin	0	—	—	1
Stourbridge	0	—	—	1
Ton Pentre	0	—	—	1
Penybont	0	—	—	1

== Bibliography ==
- The History of the Welsh Cup 1877–1993 by Ian Garland (1991) ISBN 1-872424-37-6
