= List of Wrexham A.F.C. seasons =

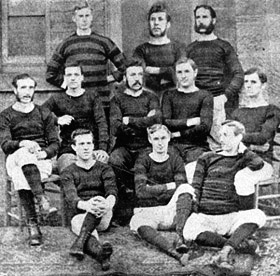
The Wrexham side that won the first Welsh Cup in 1878

This is a list of seasons played by Wrexham Association Football Club from the 1877–78 season, when the club began playing in competitive fixtures following the founding of the Welsh Cup, to the most recent current season.

The club was formed in 1864 by members of the Wrexham Cricket Club, who wanted a sporting activity for the winter months, which makes them (after Sheffield, Cray, Hallam, Notts County, and Stoke City) the sixth oldest football team, third oldest professional club and the oldest in Wales. Their first game was played on 22 October 1864 at the Denbigh County Cricket Ground (The Racecourse) against the Prince of Wales Fire Brigade.

In 1878, they won the inaugural Welsh Cup, beating Druids 1–0, and the club went on to win the competition a further 23 times, still the most wins by any team, until they were barred entry during the 1990s, along with other Welsh clubs playing in the English football league system. Through winning the Welsh Cup, Wrexham also qualified several times for the UEFA Cup Winners' Cup, reaching the quarter-finals during the 1975–76 campaign.

In 1890, the club were founding members of the second incarnation of The Combination. Apart from a brief two-year spell in the Welsh Senior League between 1894 and 1896, Wrexham spent the following fifteen seasons in The Combination, winning the competition on four occasions, before moving into the Birmingham & District League in 1905. Two years after the end of the First World War, Wrexham joined The Football League, where they spent eighty consecutive seasons, before being relegated to the Conference National in 2008.

Wrexham's highest position in the English Football League has been seventh in the EFL Championship in 2025–26, narrowly missing the promotion play-off spots.. Their lowest position in the League was 24th in the Football League Fourth Division in 1965–66 (at a time when League membership maintenance was by election) and in 1990–91 (when the League decided to suspend relegation due to expansion of the First Division to 22 clubs). The feat was repeated for a third time in Football League Two in 2007–08 and this time they were relegated to Conference National. Their lowest position in the Conference, and thus overall, was 19th in the 2019–20 season.

== Seasons ==
Wrexham's performance in the English football league system

Season	League										FA Cup	League Cup	Welsh Cup	FA Trophy	EFL Trophy	Other / Europe	
Season	Lvl	Division	Pld	W	D	L	GF	GA	Pts	Pos	FA Cup	League Cup	Welsh Cup	FA Trophy	EFL Trophy	Other / Europe	
1877–78	N/A												W				
1878–79	N/A												RU				
1879–80	N/A												2R				
1880–81	N/A												2R				
1881–82	N/A												3R				
1882–83	N/A												W				
1883–84	N/A										2R		4R				
1884–85	N/A										2R		1R				
1885–86	N/A										1R		1R				
1886–87	N/A										1R		3R				
1887–88	N/A												2R				
1888–89	N/A										1R		1R				
1889–90	N/A												RU				
1890–91	Combination		16	4	4	8	25	47	10 (Note: Deducted two points.)	8th			RU				
1891–92	Combination		22	9	2	11	45	65	20	6th			SF				
1892–93	Combination		22	9	1	12	41	66	19	8th			W				
1893–94	Combination		18	5	6	7	36	46	16	8th			SF				
1894–95	Welsh Senior League		16	13	2	1	77	20	28	1st			RU				
1895–96	Welsh Senior League		12	9	3	1	39	13	19	1st			RU				
1896–97	Combination		18	7	2	9	41	40	16	6th			W				
1897–98	Combination		24	10	6	8	45	44	26	4th			RU				
1898–99	Combination		28	15	3	10	55	48	33	5th			RU				
1899–1900	Combination		16	11	1	4	58	25	23	2nd			3R				
1900–01	Combination		22	16	3	3	62	20	35	1st							
1901–02	Combination		26	17	7	2	80	21	41	1st			RU				
1902–03	Combination		26	19	5	2	80	23	43	1st			W				
1903–04	Combination		24	12	4	8	53	34	28	5th			3R				
1904–05	Combination		26	21	1	4	70	16	43	1st			W				
1905–06	Birmingham & District League		34	17	5	12	72	55	39	6th			SF				
1906–07	Birmingham & District League		34	14	6	14	68	76	34	10th	4QR		SF				
1907–08	Birmingham & District League		34	14	9	11	51	56	37	6th			4R				
1908–09	Birmingham & District League		34	14	3	17	60	76	31	11th	1R		W				
1909–10	Birmingham & District League		34	13	7	14	61	62	33	10th			W				
1910–11	Birmingham & District League		34	17	7	10	74	52	41	4th			W				
1911–12	Birmingham & District League		34	15	10	9	62	52	40	6th			4R				
1912–13	Birmingham & District League		34	16	4	14	58	48	36	6th			3R				
1913–14	Birmingham & District League		34	15	8	11	46	47	38	7th			W				
1914–15	Birmingham & District League		34	16	8	10	63	49	40	6th			W				
No competitive football was played between 1915 and 1919 due to the First World War.
1919–20	Birmingham & District League		34	17	5	12	73	45	39	3rd			RU				
1920–21	Birmingham & District League		34	22	5	7	77	32	49	3rd			W				
1921–22	3	Third Division North	38	14	9	15	51	56	37	12th	6QR		SF				
1922–23	3	Third Division North	38	14	10	14	38	48	38	10th	1R		7R				
1923–24	3	Third Division North	42	10	18	14	37	44	38	16th	6QR		W				
1924–25	3	Third Division North	42	15	8	19	53	61	38	13th	5QR		W				
1925–26	3	Third Division North	42	11	10	21	63	92	32	19th	1R		6R				
1926–27	3	Third Division North	42	14	10	18	65	73	38	13th	2R		SF				
1927–28	3	Third Division North	42	18	6	18	64	67	42	11th	4R		6R				
1928–29	3	Third Division North	42	21	10	11	91	69	52	3rd	1R		5R				
1929–30	3	Third Division North	42	13	8	21	67	88	34	17th	4R		SF				
1930–31	3	Third Division North	42	21	12	9	94	62	54	3rd	3R		W				
1931–32	3	Third Division North	40	18	7	15	64	69	43	10th	1R		RU				
1932–33	3	Third Division North	42	24	9	9	106	51	57	2nd	2R		RU				
1933–34	3	Third Division North	42	23	5	14	102	73	51	6th	1R		6R				
1934–35	3	Third Division North	42	16	11	15	76	69	43	11th	2R		7R				
1935–36	3	Third Division North	42	15	7	20	66	75	37	18th	1R		6R				
1936–37	3	Third Division North	42	16	12	14	71	57	44	8th	3R		6R				
1937–38	3	Third Division North	42	16	11	15	58	63	43	10th	2R		6R				
1938–39	3	Third Division North	42	17	7	18	66	79	41	14th	1R		6R				
1939–40	N/A (Note: The 1939–40 season was abandoned due to the outbreak of the Second World War.)												4R				
No competitive football was played between 1940 and 1945 due to the Second World War.
1945–46	N/A (Note: Following the end of the Second World War, competitive league football did not resume until the 1946–47 season.)										3R						
1946–47	3	Third Division North	42	17	12	13	65	51	46	7th	2R		SF				
1947–48	3	Third Division North	42	21	8	13	74	54	50	3rd	2R		7R				
1948–49	3	Third Division North	42	17	9	16	56	62	43	9th	1R		7R				
1949–50	3	Third Division North	42	10	12	20	39	54	32	20th	2R		RU				
1950–51	3	Third Division North	46	15	12	19	55	71	42	14th	2R		SF				
1951–52	3	Third Division North	46	15	9	22	63	73	39	18th	2R		SF				
1952–53	3	Third Division North	46	24	8	14	86	66	56	3rd	3R		5R				
1953–54	3	Third Division North	46	21	9	16	81	68	51	8th	3R		7R				
1954–55	3	Third Division North	46	13	12	21	65	77	38	18th	2R		SF				
1955–56	3	Third Division North	46	16	10	20	66	73	42	14th	1R		6R				
1956–57	3	Third Division North	46	19	10	17	97	74	48	12th	4R		W				
1957–58	3	Third Division North	46	17	12	17	61	63	46	12th	1R		W				
1958–59	3	Third Division	46	14	14	18	63	77	42	18th	1R		SF				
1959–60	3	Third Division	46	14	8	24	68	101	36	23rd	3R		W				
1960–61	4	Fourth Division	46	17	8	21	62	56	42	16th	1R	QF	SF				
1961–62	4	Fourth Division	44	22	9	13	96	56	53	3rd	3R	1R	RU				
1962–63	3	Third Division	46	20	9	17	84	83	49	9th	3R	1R	6R				
1963–64	3	Third Division	46	13	6	27	75	107	32	23rd	2R	3R	SF				
1964–65	4	Fourth Division	46	17	9	20	84	92	43	14th	2R	1R	RU				
1965–66	4	Fourth Division	46	13	9	24	72	104	35	24th	2R	2R	5R				
1966–67	4	Fourth Division	46	16	20	10	76	62	52	7th	2R	1R	RU				
1967–68	4	Fourth Division	46	20	13	13	72	53	53	8th	1R	1R	6R				
1968–69	4	Fourth Division	46	18	14	14	61	52	50	9th	2R	2R	6R				
1969–70	4	Fourth Division	46	26	9	11	84	49	61	2nd	4R	3R	6R				
1970–71	3	Third Division	46	18	13	15	72	65	49	9th	1R	1R	RU				
1971–72	3	Third Division	46	16	8	22	59	63	40	16th	3R	1R	W				
1972–73	3	Third Division	46	14	17	15	55	54	45	12th	2R	2R	4R			Cup Winners' Cup	2R
1973–74	3	Third Division	46	22	12	12	63	43	56	4th	QF	2R	SF				
1974–75	3	Third Division	46	15	15	16	65	55	45	13th	1R	1R	W				
1975–76	3	Third Division	46	20	12	14	66	55	52	6th	1R	2R	5R			Cup Winners' Cup	QF
1976–77	3	Third Division	46	24	10	12	80	54	58	5th	4R	4R	SF				
1977–78	3	Third Division	46	23	15	8	78	45	61	1st	QF	QF	W				
1978–79	2	Second Division	42	12	14	16	45	42	38	15th	4R	2R	RU			Cup Winners' Cup	1R
1979–80	2	Second Division	42	16	6	20	40	49	38	16th	5R	2R	5R			Cup Winners' Cup	1R
1980–81	2	Second Division	42	12	14	16	43	45	38	16th	5R	1R	SF				
1981–82	2	Second Division	42	11	11	20	40	56	44 (Note: In 1981–82 three points for a win was introduced instead of two.)	21st	4R	3R	5R				
1982–83	3	Third Division	46	12	15	19	56	76	51	22nd	2R	1R	RU				
1983–84	4	Fourth Division	46	11	15	20	59	74	48	20th	1R	1R	RU	–	QF		
1984–85	4	Fourth Division	46	15	9	22	67	70	54	15th	1R	1R	5R	–	1R	Cup Winners' Cup	2R
1985–86	4	Fourth Division	46	17	9	20	68	80	60	13th	2R	2R	W	–	QR		
1986–87	4	Fourth Division	46	15	20	11	70	51	65	9th	3R	2R	SF	–	SF	Cup Winners' Cup	2R
1987–88	4	Fourth Division	46	20	6	20	69	58	66	11th	2R	1R	RU	–	QR		
1988–89	4	Fourth Division	46	19	14	13	77	63	71	7th (Note: Lost in the play-off final to Leyton Orient 2-1 on aggregate.)	1R	1R	5R	–	QF		
1989–90	4	Fourth Division	46	13	12	21	51	67	51	21st	1R	1R	RU	–	QR		
1990–91	4	Fourth Division	46	10	10	26	48	74	40	24th	1R	2R	RU	–	1R	Cup Winners' Cup	2R
1991–92	4	Fourth Division	42	14	9	19	52	73	51	14th	4R	1R	5R	–	SF		
1992–93 (Note: In 1992-93 the Premier League was founded, and the three remaining divisions in the Football League were renamed: Level 1 - First Division became Premier League; Level 2 - Second Division became First Division; Level 3 - Third Division became Second Division; Level 4 - Fourth Division became Third Division)	4	Third Division	42	23	11	8	75	52	80	2nd	1R	1R	SF	–	2R		
1993–94	3	Second Division	46	17	11	18	66	77	62	12th	1R	2R	4R	–	2R		
1994–95	3	Second Division	46	16	15	15	65	64	63	13th	4R	2R	W	–	QF		
1995–96	3	Second Division	46	18	16	12	76	55	70	8th	3R	1R	–	–	2R	Cup Winners' Cup	QR
1996–97	3	Second Division	46	17	18	11	54	50	69	8th	QF	1R	–	–	2R		
1997–98	3	Second Division	46	18	16	12	55	51	70	7th	3R	1R	–	–	2R		
1998–99	3	Second Division	46	13	14	19	43	62	53	17th	4R	1R	–	–	AF		
1999–2000	3	Second Division	46	17	11	18	52	61	62	11th	4R	1R	–	–	1R		
2000–01	3	Second Division	46	17	12	17	65	71	63	10th	1R	1R	–	–	1R		
2001–02	3	Second Division	46	11	10	25	56	89	43	23rd	1R	1R	–	–	2R		
2002–03	4	Third Division	46	23	15	8	84	50	84	3rd	1R	2R	–	–	QF		
2003–04	3	Second Division	46	17	9	20	50	60	60	13th	1R	1R	–	–	2R		
2004–05 (Note: In 2004–05 the Football League was rebranded, and the First Division, Second Division and Third Division were renamed the Championship, League One and League Two respectively.)	3	League One	46	13	14	19	62	80	43 (Note: Deducted 10 points for entering administration.)	22nd	2R	2R	–	–	W		
2005–06	4	League Two	46	15	14	17	61	54	59	13th	1R	1R	–	–	1R		
2006–07	4	League Two	46	13	12	21	43	65	51	19th	3R	2R	–	–	1R		
2007–08	4	League Two	46	10	10	26	38	70	40	24th	1R	2R	–	–	1R		
2008–09	5	Conference National	46	18	12	16	64	48	64	10th	4QR	–	–	4R	–		
2009–10	5	Conference National	44	15	13	16	45	39	58	11th	2R	–	–	1R	–		
2010–11	5	Conference National	46	22	15	9	66	49	81	4th (Note: Lost in the play-off semi-final to Luton Town 5-1 on aggregate.)	4QR	–	–	2R	–		
2011–12	5	Conference National	46	30	8	8	85	33	98	2nd (Note: Lost in the play-off semi-final to Luton Town 3-2 on aggregate.)	3R	–	3R	1R	–		
2012–13	5	Conference National	46	22	14	10	74	45	80	5th (Note: Lost in the play-off final to Newport County 2-0.)	1R	–	–	W	–		
2013–14	5	Conference National	46	16	11	19	61	61	59	17th	2R	–	–	2R	–		
2014–15	5	Conference National	46	17	15	14	56	52	66	11th	3R	–	–	RU	–		
2015–16 (Note: In 2015–16 the Football Conference was renamed to the National League)	5	National League	46	20	9	17	71	56	69	8th	4QR	–	–	2R	–		
2016–17	5	National League	46	15	13	18	47	61	58	13th	4QR	–	–	1R	–		
2017–18	5	National League	46	17	19	10	49	39	70	10th	4QR	–	–	1R	–		
2018–19	5	National League	46	25	9	12	58	39	84	4th (Note: Lost in the play-off quarter-final to Eastleigh 1–0 (after extra time).)	2R	–	–	2R	–		
2019–20	5	National League	37	11	10	16	46	49	43	19th	1R	–	–	1R	–	Scottish Challenge Cup	QF
2020–21	5	National League	42	19	11	12	64	43	68	8th	4QR	–	–	3R	–		
2021–22	5	National League	44	26	10	8	91	46	88	2nd (Note: Lost in the play-off semi-final to Grimsby Town 5–4 (after extra time).)	1R	–	–	RU	–		
2022–23	5	National League	46	34	9	3	116	43	111	1st	4R	–	–	4R	–		
2023–24	4	League Two	46	26	10	10	89	52	88	2nd	4R	2R	–	–	R32		
2024–25	3	League One	46	27	11	8	67	34	92	2nd	1R	1R	–	–	SF		
2025–26	2	Championship	46	19	14	13	69	65	71	7th	5R	4R	–	–	–		
2026–27	2	Championship	46										–	–	–		
Season	Lvl	Division	Pld	W	D	L	GF	GA	Pts	Pos	FA Cup	League Cup	Welsh Cup	FA Trophy	EFL Trophy	Other / Europe	

== Key ==
Key to league record:

- Lvl = Level of the division in the English football pyramid
- Pld = Matches played
- W = Matches won
- D = Matches drawn
- L = Matches lost
- GF = Goals for
- GA = Goals against
- Pts = Points
- Pos = Final position

Key to rounds:

- QR = Qualifying round
- 1R = First round
- 2R = Second round
- 3R = Third round
- 4R = Fourth round
- 5R = Fifth Round
- R32 = Round of 32
- QF = Quarter-finals
- SF = Semi-finals
- AF = Area finals
- RU = Runners-up
- W = Winners
- TBD = To be determined

Champions	Runners-up	Promoted	Relegated
