= 1880 Welsh Cup final =

1880 Football Association of Wales Challenge Cup final
- Event: 1879–80 Welsh Cup
Druids	Ruthin
2	1
- Date: 13 March 1880
- Venue: Racecourse Ground, Wrexham
- Referee: Mr Brooks (Wolverhampton)
- Attendance: 4,000

The 1880 Welsh Cup final, was the third in the competition. It was contested by Druids and Ruthin at the Racecourse Ground, Wrexham.

== Route to the Final ==
=== Druids ===
Round	Opposition	Score	Location
1st	Mold (A)	w/o	
2nd	Wrexham (A)	1-0	The Racecourse, Wrexham
3rd	Aberystwyth (N)	6-0	Dolgellau
SF	Newtown White Stars (N)	3-1	Cricket Field, Oswestry

=== Ruthin ===
Round	Opposition	Score	Location
1st	Llangollen (H)	4-0	Ruthin
2nd	Corwen (H)	3-0	Ruthin
3rd	Newtown Excelsior (N)	1-1	The Racecourse, Wrexham
3rd	Newtown Excelsior (N)	4-2	The Racecourse, Wrexham
SF	Bye		

== Final ==
13 March 1880
15:30

Druids	2 – 1	Ruthin
Vaughan, John Jones		Goodwin

Racecourse Ground, Wrexham
Attendance: 4,000
Referee: Mr Brooks (Wolverhampton)

Druids	Ruthin

GK	(Wales) B. Roberts
FB	(Wales) Llewelyn Kenrick (c)
FB	(Wales) Jack Powell
HB	(Wales) William Williams
HB	(Wales) Edward Bowen
RW	(Wales) John Jones
RW	(Wales) Dennis Heywood
LW	(Wales) John Vaughan
LW	(Wales) Jack Jones
CF	(Wales) Knyvett Crosse
CF	(Wales) Charles Ketley

GK	(Wales) H. Parry
FB	(Wales) T. Roberts
FB	(Wales) G. Halley
HB	(Wales) R. Maddocks
HB	(Wales) Price Mostyn
HB	(Wales) R. Williams
RW	(Wales) William Pierce Owen
RW	(Wales) Walter Hugh Roberts (c)
LW	(Wales) Uriah Goodwin
LW	(Wales) G.H. Simon
CF	(Wales) Alun Lloyd

Assistant referees:

- Mr Bethell (Birkenheead)
- Mr Edward Manners (Wrexham)
