= 1883 Welsh Cup final =

1883 Football Association of Wales Challenge Cup final
- Event: 1882–83 Welsh Cup
Wrexham	Druids
1	0
- Date: 21 April 1883
- Venue: The Racecourse, Wrexham
- Referee: W.H. Holt (Shrewsbury)
- Attendance: 2,000

The 1883 Welsh Cup final, was the sixth in the competition. It was contested by Wrexham and Druids at The Racecourse, Wrexham.

== Final ==
21 April 1883
15:30

Wrexham	1 – 0	Druids
W Roberts 75'

Racecourse Ground, Wrexham
Attendance: 2,000
Referee: Mr W.H. Holt (Shrewsbury)

Wrexham	Druids

GK	(Wales) James Trainer
FB	(Wales) George Thomas
FB	(Wales) Walter Davies
HB	(Wales) Tom Burke
HB	(Wales) E. Griffiths
HB	(Wales) Henry Edwards
RW	(Wales) Robert Davies
RW	(Wales) W. Roberts
LW	(Wales) J. Davies
LW	(Wales) J. Jones
CF	(Wales) M. Davies

GK	(Wales) Harry Adams
FB	(Wales) Jack Powell (c)
FB	(Wales) A. Powell
HB	(Wales) Robert Roberts
HB	(Wales) William Williams
HB	(Wales) J. Bowen
RW	(Wales) James Lloyd
RW	(Wales) Jack Doughty
LW	(Wales) John Vaughan
LW	(Wales) A. Jones
CF	(Wales) Charles Ketley

Assistant referees:

- Mr T.H. Bancroft (Wrexham)
- Mr E.S. Roberts (Llantysilio)
