= 1965–66 Welsh Cup =

Tournament details
- Country: Wales

Final positions
- Champions: (Wales) Swansea Town
- Runners-up: (England) Chester

The 1965–66 FAW Welsh Cup is the 79th season of the annual knockout tournament for competitive football teams in Wales.

Swansea Town won the competition.

== Key ==
League name pointed after clubs name.

- CCL - Cheshire County League
- FL D2 - Football League Second Division
- FL D3 - Football League Third Division
- FL D4 - Football League Fourth Division
- SFL - Southern Football League
- WLN - Welsh League North

== Fifth round ==
Ten winners from the Fourth round and six new clubs.

Tie no	Home	Score	Away
1	Bangor City (CCL)	5–0	Holywell Town (WLN)
2	Portmadoc (WLN)	2–0	Rhyl (CCL)
3	Chester (FL D4)	4–1	Wrexham (FL D4)
4	Borough United (WLN)	4–1	Holyhead Town (WLN)
5	Swansea Town (FL D3)	2–2	Cardiff City (FL D2)
replay	Cardiff City (FL D2)	2–5	Swansea Town (FL D3)
6	Ebbw Vale (WFL)	1–1	Merthyr Tydfil (SFL)
replay	Merthyr Tydfil (SFL)	2–0	Ebbw Vale (WFL)
7	Hereford United (SFL)	1–2	Newport County (FL D4)
8	Welshpool (WLN)	4–3	Barry Town (SFL)

== Sixth round ==
Tie no	Home	Score	Away
1	Newport County (FL D4)	2–2	Chester (FL D4)
replay	Chester (FL D4)	2–0	Newport County (FL D4)
2	Borough United (WLN)	0–5	Bangor City (CCL)
3	Portmadoc (WLN)	1–1	Swansea Town (FL D3)
replay	Swansea Town (FL D3)	5–0	Portmadoc (WLN)
4	Merthyr Tydfil (SFL)	5–0	Welshpool (WLN)

== Semifinal ==
Tie no	Home	Score	Away
1	Swansea Town (FL D3)	3–1	Merthyr Tydfil (SFL)
2	Bangor City (CCL)	0–3	Chester (FL D4)

== Final ==
Replay were held at Chester.

Tie no	Home	Score	Away
1	Swansea Town (FL D3)	3–0	Chester (FL D4)
1	Chester (FL D4)	1–0	Swansea Town (FL D3)
replay	Chester (FL D4)	1–2	Swansea Town (FL D3)
