= Eric Morris (footballer, born 1940) =

Welsh footballer (1940–2011)

Personal information
- Full name: Edward Eric Morris
- Date of birth: 15 April 1940
- Place of birth: Mold, Wales
- Date of death: 2011 (aged 70–71)
- Place of death: Wrexham, Wales
- Position: Full back

Senior career*
Years	Team	Apps	(Gls)
1960–1961	Chester	1	(0)
- * Club domestic league appearances and goals

Edward Eric Morris (15 April 1940 – 2011) was a Welsh footballer, who played as a full back in the Football League for Chester.

After leaving Sealand Road, he was a member of the Borough United side which won the Welsh Cup in 1963 and would play in two rounds of the European Cup Winners Cup (they lost on aggregate to Slovan Bratislava after eliminating Sliema Wanderers of Malta).
