= 1930–31 Welsh Cup =

Tournament details
- Country: Wales

Final positions
- Champions: (England) Wrexham
- Runners-up: (Wales) Shrewsbury Town

The 1930–31 FAW Welsh Cup is the 50th season of the annual knockout tournament for competitive football teams in Wales.

== Key ==
League name pointed after clubs name.

- B&DL - Birmingham & District League
- CCL - Cheshire County League
- FL D2 - Football League Second Division
- FL D3N - Football League Third Division North
- FL D3S - Football League Third Division South
- SFL - Southern Football League
- WLN - Welsh League North
- WLS - Welsh League South

== Third round ==
Tie no	Home	Score	Away
1	Chester (CCL)	9–1	Cross Street Gwersyllt

== Fourth round ==
Tie no	Home	Score	Away
1	Llanfairfechan	2–11	Chester (CCL)

== Fifth round ==
Eight winners from the Fourth round and eight new clubs.

Tie no	Home	Score	Away
1	Newport County (FL D3N)	1–1	Chester (CCL)
replay	Chester (CCL)	0–0	Newport County (FL D3N)
replay	Newport County (FL D3N)	2–4	Chester (CCL)

== Sixth round ==
Tie no	Home	Score	Away
1	Chester (CCL)	0–1	Cardiff City (FL D2)

== Semifinal ==
Match between Swansea Town and Wrexham were held at Chester.

Tie no	Home	Score	Away
1	Shrewsbury Town (B&DL)	1–0	Cardiff City (FL D2)
2	Swansea Town (FL D2)	2–5	Wrexham (FL D3N)

== Final ==
Tie no	Home	Score	Away
1	Wrexham (FL D3N)	7–0	Shrewsbury Town (B&DL)
