= Walter Hugh Roberts =

Welsh footballer

Walter Roberts
Personal information
- Full name: Walter Hugh Roberts
- Date of birth: 1858
- Place of birth: Wales
- Date of death: 20 June 1886 (aged 27–28)
- Place of death: Rhyl, Wales

Senior career*
Years	Team	Apps	(Gls)
- Ruthin Town
- Rhyl

International career
1882–1884	Wales	6	(1)
- * Club domestic league appearances and goals

Walter Hugh Roberts (1858-1886) was a Welsh international footballer. He was part of the Wales national football team between 1882 and 1884, playing 6 matches and scoring 1 goal. He played his first match on 13 March 1882 against England and his last match on 29 March 1884 against Scotland.

== Club career ==
Roberts played for Ruthin and Rhyl. He was captain of both clubs.

== Outside Football ==
He was the son of Price Roberts of Ruthin. He was employed as a chief clerk for the London and North Western Railway Company at Rhyl. He lived at Park Place, Ruthin.

== Death ==
Walter Hugh Roberts died on 20 June 1886 at 18 Aquarium Street, Rhyl. He had been suffering with a painful and lingering illness. He was buried at Llanfwrog Churchyard.

== See also ==
- List of Wales international footballers (alphabetical)
