= 1956–57 Welsh Cup =

Tournament details
- Country: Wales

Final positions
- Champions: (Wales) Wrexham
- Runners-up: (Wales) Swansea Town

The 1956–57 FAW Welsh Cup is the 70th season of the annual knockout tournament for competitive football teams in Wales.

== Key ==
League name pointed after clubs name.

- B&DL – Birmingham & District League
- CCL – Cheshire County League
- FL D1 – Football League First Division
- FL D2 – Football League Second Division
- FL D3N – Football League Third Division North
- FL D3S – Football League Third Division South
- SFL – Southern Football League

== Fifth round ==
Ten winners from the Fourth round and six new clubs.

Tie no	Home	Score	Away
1	Oswestry Town (B&DL)	0–3	Chester (FL D3N)

== Sixth round ==
Tie no	Home	Score	Away
1	Cardiff City (FL D1)	0–2	Chester (FL D3N)

== Semifinal ==
Swansea Town and Newport County played both matches at Cardiff, Wrexham and Chester played at Rhyl.

Tie no	Home	Score	Away
1	Swansea Town (FL D2)	1–1	Newport County (FL D3S)
replay	Swansea Town (FL D2)	3–0	Newport County (FL D3S)
2	Wrexham (FL D3N)	2–0	Chester (FL D3N)

== Final ==
Final were held at Cardiff.

Tie no	Home	Score	Away
1	Wrexham (FL D3N)	2–1	Swansea Town (FL D2)
