= 1939–40 Welsh Cup =

Tournament details
- Country: Wales

Final positions
- Champions: (England) Wellington Town
- Runners-up: (Wales) Swansea Town

The 1939–40 FAW Welsh Cup is the 59th season of the annual knockout tournament for competitive football teams in Wales.

== Key ==
League name pointed after clubs name.

- B&DL - Birmingham & District League
- FL D2 - Football League Second Division
- FL D3N - Football League Third Division North

== Fourth round ==
Eight winners from the Third round plus 18 new clubs.

Tie no	Home	Score	Away
1	Chester (FL D3N)	4–2	Shrewsbury Town

== Fifth round ==
Ten winners from the Fourth round. Cardiff City, Chester and Southport get a bye to the Sixth round.

== Sixth round ==
Five winners from the Fifth round plus Cardiff City, Chester and Southport.

Tie no	Home	Score	Away
1	Chester (FL D3N)	1–3	Wellington Town (B&DL)
2	New Brighton (FL D3N)	1–0	Southport (FL D3N)
3	Cardiff City (FL D3S)	1–1	Newport County (FL D2)
4	Swansea Town (FL D2)	2–0	Aberystwyth Town (MWL)
Replay	Newport County (FL D2)	5–0	Cardiff City (FL D3S)

== Semifinal ==
Replay between Wellington Town and New Brighton were held at Shrewsbury.

Tie no	Home	Score	Away
1	Swansea Town (FL D2)	1–0	Newport County (FL D2)
2	Wellington Town (B&DL)	0–0	New Brighton (FL D3N)
replay	Wellington Town (B&DL)	4–2	New Brighton (FL D3N)

== Final ==
Final were held at Shrewsbury.

Tie no	Home	Score	Away
1	Wellington Town (B&DL)	4–0	Swansea Town (FL D2)
