= 1961–62 Welsh Cup =

Tournament details
- Country: Wales

Final positions
- Champions: (Wales) Bangor City
- Runners-up: (Wales) Wrexham

The 1961–62 FAW Welsh Cup is the 75th season of the annual knockout tournament for competitive football teams in Wales.

Bangor City won the competition after defeating Wrexham in the final.

== Key ==
League name pointed after clubs name.

- CCL - Cheshire County League
- FL D2 - Football League Second Division
- FL D3 - Football League Third Division
- FL D4 - Football League Fourth Division
- WLN - Welsh League North

== Fifth round ==
Ten winners from the Fourth round and six new clubs.

| Tie no | Home | Score | Away |
|---|---|---|---|
| 1 | Chester (FL D4) | 1–2 | Holyhead Town (WLN) |

== Semifinal ==
Bangor City and Cardiff City played at Wrexham, Wrexham and Swansea Town played at Cardiff.

| Tie no | Home | Score | Away |
|---|---|---|---|
| 1 | Bangor City (CCL) | 2–0 | Cardiff City (FL D1) |
| 2 | Wrexham (FL D4) | 3–2 | Swansea Town (FL D2) |

== Final ==
Third match was played at Rhyl.

| Tie no | Home | Score | Away |
|---|---|---|---|
| 1 | Wrexham (FL D4) | 3–0 | Bangor City (CCL) |
| 1 | Bangor City (CCL) | 2–0 | Wrexham (FL D4) |
| replay | Bangor City (CCL) | 3–1 | Wrexham (FL D4) |
