= 1989–90 Welsh Cup =

The 1989–90 Welsh Cup winners were Hereford United. The final was played at the National Stadium in Cardiff in front of an attendance of 4,182. Wrexham qualified for the 1990–91 European Cup Winners' Cup as the highest ranking Welsh team.

== Semi-finals – first leg ==
Tie no	Home team	Score	Away team
1	Barry Town	0–1	Wrexham
2	Cardiff City	0–3	Hereford United

== Semi-finals – second leg ==
Tie no	Home team	Score	Away team
1	Wrexham	0–0	Barry Town
2	Hereford United	1–3	Cardiff City

== Final ==
13 May 1990
15:00

Wrexham	1–2	Hereford United
Worthington		Robinson; Benbow

National Stadium, Cardiff
Attendance: 4,182
Referee: J W Lloyd (Wrexham)

Wrexham	Hereford United
