= 2000 Welsh Cup final =

Association football match

2000 Football Association of Wales Challenge Cup final
- Event: 1999–2000 Welsh Cup
Bangor City	Cwmbran Town
1	0
- Date: 7 May 2000
- Venue: Racecourse Ground, Wrexham
- Man of the Match: Graham Brett
- Referee: B Lawlor (Holyhead)
- Attendance: 1,125

The 2000 Welsh Cup final saw Bangor City win the Welsh Cup after beating Cwmbran Town 1–0 at Racecourse Ground in the 113th Welsh Cup Final.

== Match ==
=== Details ===
7 May 2000
15:30 BST

Bangor City	1–0	Cwmbran Town
Paul Roberts 23'	Report

Racecourse Ground, Wrexham
Attendance: 1,125
Referee: B Lawlor (Holyhead)

Bangor City	Cwmbran Town

Match rules

- 90 minutes
- 30 minutes of extra-time if necessary
- Penalty shoot-out if scores still level
- Three named substitutes
- Maximum of three substitutions
