= 1962–63 Welsh Cup =

Tournament details
- Country: Wales

Final positions
- Champions: (Wales) Borough United
- Runners-up: (Wales) Newport County

The 1962–63 FAW Welsh Cup is the 76th season of the annual knockout tournament for competitive football teams in Wales.

Borough United won the competition by defeating Newport County in the final.

== Key ==
League name pointed after clubs name.

- CCL - Cheshire County League
- FL D2 - Football League Second Division
- FL D3 - Football League Third Division
- FL D4 - Football League Fourth Division
- SFL - Southern Football League
- WLN - Welsh League North

== Fifth round ==
Ten winners from the Fourth round and six new clubs.

Tie no	Home	Score	Away
1	Wrexham (FL D3)	1–0	Chester (FL D4)

== Semifinal ==
Borough United and Hereford United played at Wrexham, Newport County and Swansea Town played at Cardiff.

Tie no	Home	Score	Away
1	Borough United (WLN)	1–0	Hereford United (SFL)
2	Newport County (FL D4)	1–0	Swansea Town (FL D2)

== Final ==
Tie no	Home	Score	Away
1	Borough United (WLN)	2–1	Newport County (FL D4)
1	Newport County (FL D4)	0–0	Borough United (WLN)
