= 1928–29 Welsh Cup =

Tournament details
- Country: Wales

Final positions
- Champions: Connah's Quay & Shotton
- Runners-up: Cardiff City

The 1928–29 FAW Welsh Cup is the 48th season of the annual knockout tournament for competitive football teams in Wales.

== Key ==
League name pointed after clubs name.

- B&DL - Birmingham & District League
- CCL - Cheshire County League
- FL D1 - Football League First Division
- FL D3N - Football League Third Division North
- FL D3S - Football League Third Division South
- SFL - Southern Football League
- WLN - Welsh League North
- WLS - Welsh League South

== Third round ==
Tie no	Home	Score	Away
1	Chester (CCL)	1–1	Oswestry Town B&DL

== Fourth round ==
Tie no	Home	Score	Away
1	Chester (CCL)	2–5	Buckley

== Fifth round ==
Eight winners from the Fourth round and eight new clubs.

== Semifinal ==
Both semifinals were held at Rhyl.

Tie no	Home	Score	Away
1	Connah's Quay & Shotton	7–0	Merthyr Town (FL D3S)
2	Rhyl	1–2	Cardiff City (FL D2)

== Final ==
Final were held at Shrewsbury, replay - at Wrexham.

Tie no	Home	Score	Away
1	Connah's Quay & Shotton	3–0	Cardiff City (FL D1)
