= 1948–49 Welsh Cup =

Tournament details
- Country: Wales

Final positions
- Champions: (Wales) Merthyr Tydfil
- Runners-up: (Wales) Swansea Town

The 1948–49 FAW Welsh Cup is the 62nd season of the annual knockout tournament for competitive football teams in Wales.

== Key ==
League name pointed after clubs name.

- CCL - Cheshire County League
- FL D2 - Football League Second Division
- FL D3N - Football League Third Division North
- FL D3S - Football League Third Division South
- SFL - Southern Football League

== Fifth round ==
Eight winners from the Fourth round and ten new clubs.

Tie no	Home	Score	Away
1	Chester (FL D3N)	0–6	Wrexham (FL D3N)

== Sixth round ==
Two winners from the Fifth round. Seven other clubs get a bye to the Seventh round.

== Seventh round ==
One winner from the Sixth round plus seven clubs who get a bye in the previous round.

== Semifinal ==
Swansea Town and Rhyl played at Wrexham, Cardiff City and Merthyr Tydfil played at Swansea.

Tie no	Home	Score	Away
1	Swansea Town (FL D3S)	3–0	Rhyl (CCL)
2	Cardiff City (FL D2)	1–3	Merthyr Tydfil (SFL)

== Final ==
Final were held at Cardiff.

Tie no	Home	Score	Away
1	Merthyr Tydfil (SFL)	2–0	Swansea Town (FL D3S)
