= Walter Davies (footballer) =

Welsh footballer

Personal information
- Date of birth: 1863
- Place of birth: Wales

Senior career*
Years	Team	Apps	(Gls)
1883–1884	Wrexham Olympic		

International career
1884	Wales	1	(0)
- * Club domestic league appearances and goals

Walter Davies (born 1863) was a Welsh international footballer. He was part of the Wales national football team, playing 1 match on 9 February 1884 against Ireland.

== See also ==
- List of Wales international footballers (alphabetical)
