= 1963–64 Welsh Cup =

Tournament details
- Country: Wales

Final positions
- Champions: (Wales) Cardiff City
- Runners-up: (Wales) Bangor City

The 1963–64 FAW Welsh Cup is the 77th season of the annual knockout tournament for competitive football teams in Wales.

Cardiff City won the competition after beating Bangor City in the final.

== Key ==
League name pointed after clubs name.

- CCL - Cheshire County League
- FL D2 - Football League Second Division
- FL D3 - Football League Third Division
- FL D4 - Football League Fourth Division
- SFL - Southern Football League
- WLN - Welsh League North

== Fifth round ==
Ten winners from the Fourth round and six new clubs.

Tie no	Home	Score	Away
1	Chester (FL D4)	5–1	Borough United (WLN)

== Sixth round ==
Tie no	Home	Score	Away
1	Cardiff City (FL D2)	3–1	Chester (FL D4)

== Semifinal ==
Newport County and Cardiff City played at Swansea, replay were held it Cardiff, Bangor City and Wrexham played at Chester.

Tie no	Home	Score	Away
1	Newport County (FL D4)	2–2	Cardiff City (FL D2)
replay	Cardiff City (FL D2)	1–0	Newport County (FL D4)
2	Bangor City (CCL)	3–1	Wrexham (FL D3)

== Final ==
Tie no	Home	Score	Away
1	Bangor City (CCL)	2–0	Cardiff City (FL D2)
1	Cardiff City (FL D2)	3–1	Bangor City (CCL)
replay	Cardiff City (FL D2)	2–0	Bangor City (CCL)
