= 1964–65 Welsh Cup =

Tournament details
- Country: Wales

Final positions
- Champions: (Wales) Cardiff City
- Runners-up: (Wales) Wrexham

The 1964–65 FAW Welsh Cup is the 78th season of the annual knockout tournament for competitive football teams in Wales.

Cardiff City won the competition by beating Wrexham in the final.

== Key ==
League name pointed after clubs name.

- CCL - Cheshire County League
- FL D2 - Football League Second Division
- FL D3 - Football League Third Division
- FL D4 - Football League Fourth Division
- SFL - Southern Football League
- WLN - Welsh League North

== Fifth round ==
Ten winners from the Fourth round and six new clubs.

Tie no	Home	Score	Away
1	Chester (FL D4)	1–1	Bangor City (CCL)
replay	Bangor City (CCL)	0–4	Chester (FL D4)

== Sixth round ==
Tie no	Home	Score	Away
1	Chester (FL D4)	0–0	Borough United (WLN)
replay	Borough United (WLN)	2–2	Chester (FL D4)
replay	Chester (FL D4)	3–0	Borough United (WLN)

== Semifinal ==
Cardiff City and Swansea Town played at Newport.

Tie no	Home	Score	Away
1	Cardiff City (FL D2)	1–0	Swansea Town (FL D2)
2	Wrexham (FL D4)	3–1	Chester (FL D4)

== Final ==
Replay were held at Shrewsbury.

Tie no	Home	Score	Away
1	Cardiff City (FL D2)	5–1	Wrexham (FL D4)
1	Wrexham (FL D4)	1–0	Cardiff City (FL D2)
replay	Cardiff City (FL D2)	3–0	Wrexham (FL D4)
