= 1959–60 Welsh Cup =

Tournament details
- Country: Wales

Final positions
- Champions: (Wales) Wrexham
- Runners-up: (Wales) Cardiff City

The 1959–60 FAW Welsh Cup is the 73rd season of the annual knockout tournament for competitive football teams in Wales.

== Key ==
League name pointed after clubs name.

- CCL - Cheshire County League
- FL D2 - Football League Second Division
- FL D3 - Football League Third Division
- FL D4 - Football League Fourth Division
- SFL - Southern Football League
- WLN - Welsh League North
- WLS D1 - Welsh League South Division One

== Fifth round ==
Ten winners from the Fourth round and six new clubs.

| Tie no | Home | Score | Away |
|---|---|---|---|
| 1 | Chester (FL D4) | 0–2 | Holywell Town (WLN) |

== Sixth round ==
| Tie no | Home | Score | Away |
|---|---|---|---|
| 1 | Merthyr Tydfil | 1-1 | Wrexham (FL D3) |

== Semifinal ==
Cardiff City and Bangor City played at Wrexham, replay - at Newport, Wrexham and Abergavenny Thursdays played at Hereford.

| Tie no | Home | Score | Away |
|---|---|---|---|
| 1 | Cardiff City (FL D2) | 1–1 | Bangor City (CCL) |
| replay | Cardiff City (FL D2) | 4–1 | Bangor City (CCL) |
| 2 | Wrexham (FL D3) | 2–2 | Abergavenny Thursdays (WLS D1) |
| replay | Wrexham (FL D3) | 2–0 | Abergavenny Thursdays (WLS D1) |

== Final ==
| Tie no | Home | Score | Away |
|---|---|---|---|
| 1 | Cardiff City (FL D2) | 1–1 | Wrexham (FL D3) |
| replay | Wrexham (FL D3) | 1–0 | Cardiff City (FL D2) |
