= Uriah Goodwin =

Welsh footballer (1859–1924)

Personal information
- Date of birth: 1859
- Place of birth: Llanfrog, Denbighshire, Wales
- Date of death: 1924 (aged 64–65)
- Place of death: Denbighshire, Wales

Senior career*
| Years | Team | Apps | (Gls) |
| 1879–1880 | Ruthin Town | | |

International career
| 1881 | Wales | 1 | (0) |
- * Club domestic league appearances and goals

Uriah Goodwin (1859–1924) was a Welsh male international footballer. He was part of the Wales national football team, playing 1 match on 26 February 1881 against England. On club level he played for Ruthin Town F.C. He competed at the 1879–80 Welsh Cup, scoring a goal in the final against Druids F.C.

== See also ==
- List of Wales international footballers (alphabetical)
