= Robert Davies (footballer, born 1861) =

Welsh footballer

Personal information
- Full name: Robert Davies
- Date of birth: 1861
- Place of birth: Wrexham, Wales
- Position: Forward

Senior career*
Years	Team	Apps	(Gls)
1879–1881	Civil Service, Wrexham		
1881–1884	Wrexham		
1884–1888	Wrexham Olympic		
1888–1892	Wrexham		

International career
1883–1885	Wales	3	(0)
- * Club domestic league appearances and goals

Robert Davies (also known as "Bob Pugh"; born 1861) was a Welsh footballer who played as a forward for various clubs in Wrexham in the 1880s and 1890s. He also made three appearances for Wales, all against Ireland.

== Football career ==
Davies was born in Wrexham and started his career with the Wrexham Civil Service Club before joining Wrexham in 1881. Described as "a slightly built individual with much natural ability" who was "full of attacking instinct" and possessed a "very accurate shot". He was a superb dribbler who regularly won dribbling competitions; despite this he was a keen advocate of the combination game and helped introduce this into Wrexham in place of the individualism that was still prevalent there until the 1880s.

In 1883, he was part of the Wrexham side who won the Welsh Cup, defeating the Druids 1–0. Wrexham next reached the final in 1890, but this time lost by a single goal to Chirk.

His first international appearance came on 17 March 1883, when he was selected to play against Ireland; the match ended with the scores level with one goal each. Davies retained his place for the next match, eleven months later, also against Ireland in Wales's first match in the inaugural British Home Championship; Wales won comfortably putting six goals past the Irish, with no reply. Davies was not selected again until April 1885, when he failed to score in an 8–2 victory over the hapless Irish.

== International appearances ==
Davies made three appearances for Wales in international matches, as follows:

Date	Venue	Opponent	Result	Goals	Competition
17 March 1883	Ulster Ground, Belfast	Ireland	1–1	0	Friendly
9 February 1884	Racecourse Ground, Wrexham	Ireland	6–0	0	British Home Championship
11 April 1885	Ulster Ground, Belfast	Ireland	8–2	0	British Home Championship

Win	Draw	Loss

== Later career ==
Davies was later a referee for the Football Association of Wales and managed the Albion Hotel in Wrexham.

== Honours ==
Wrexham

- Welsh Cup winners: 1883
- Welsh Cup finalists: 1890
