= 1955–56 Welsh Cup =

Tournament details
- Country: Wales

Final positions
- Champions: (Wales) Cardiff City
- Runners-up: (Wales) Swansea Town

The 1955–56 FAW Welsh Cup is the 69th season of the annual knockout tournament for competitive football teams in Wales.

== Key ==
League name pointed after clubs name.

- B&DL - Birmingham & District League
- CCL - Cheshire County League
- FL D1 - Football League First Division
- FL D2 - Football League Second Division
- FL D3N - Football League Third Division North
- FL D3S - Football League Third Division South
- SFL - Southern Football League

== Fifth round ==
Nine winners from the Fourth round and seven new clubs.

Tie no	Home	Score	Away
1	Rhyl (CCL)	0–2	Chester (FL D3N)

== Sixth round ==
Tie no	Home	Score	Away
1	Swansea Town (FL D2)	1–0	Chester (FL D3N)

== Semifinal ==
Swansea Town and Newport County played at Cardiff, Oswestry Town and Cardiff City played at Wrexham.

Tie no	Home	Score	Away
1	Oswestry Town (B&DL)	0–7	Cardiff City (FL D1)
2	Swansea Town (FL D2)	5–2	Newport County (FL D3S)

== Final ==
Final were held at Cardiff.

Tie no	Home	Score	Away
1	Cardiff City (FL D1)	3–2	Swansea Town (FL D2)
