= 1949–50 Welsh Cup =

Tournament details
- Country: Wales

Final positions
- Champions: (Wales) Swansea Town
- Runners-up: (Wales) Wrexham

The 1949–50 FAW Welsh Cup is the 63rd season of the annual knockout tournament for competitive football teams in Wales.

== Key ==
League name pointed after clubs name.

- CCL - Cheshire County League
- FL D3N - Football League Third Division North
- FL D3S - Football League Third Division South
- SFL - Southern Football League

== Fifth round ==
Seven winners from the Fourth round and eleven new clubs. Caernarvon Town get a bye to the Sixth round.

Tie no	Home	Score	Away
1	South Liverpool (CCL)	0–0	Chester (FL D3N)
replay	Chester (FL D3N)	2–2	South Liverpool (CCL)
replay	South Liverpool (CCL)	0–2	Chester (FL D3N)

== Sixth round ==
One winner from the Fifth round and Caernarvon Town. Seven other clubs get a bye to the Seventh round.

== Seventh round ==
One winner from the Sixth round plus seven clubs who get a bye in the previous round.

Tie no	Home	Score	Away
1	Chester (FL D3N)	3–2	Barry Town (SFL)

Tie no	Winning Team	Score	Losing Team
	Swansea Town	3–0	Cardiff City
	Wrexham	3–0	Flint Town United
	Merthyr Tydfil	2–0	Bangor City

== Semifinal ==
Swansea Town and Mertyr Tydfil played at Cardiff.

Tie no	Home	Score	Away
1	Swansea Town (FL D3S)	5–1	Merthyr Tydfil (SFL)
2	Wrexham (FL D3N)	0–0	Chester (FL D3N)
replay	Chester (FL D3N)	1–5	Wrexham (FL D3N)

== Final ==
Final were held at Cardiff.

Tie no	Home	Score	Away
1	Swansea Town (FL D2)	4–1	Wrexham (FL D3N)
