= 1975–76 Welsh Cup =

Tournament details
- Country: Wales

Final positions
- Champions: (Wales) Cardiff City
- Runners-up: (England) Hereford United

The 1975–76 FAW Welsh Cup is the 89th season of the annual knockout tournament for competitive football teams in Wales.

== Key ==
League name pointed after clubs name.

- CCL - Cheshire County League
- FL D2 - Football League Second Division
- FL D3 - Football League Third Division
- FL D4 - Football League Fourth Division
- NPL - Northern Premier League
- SFL - Southern Football League
- WLN - Welsh League North
- WLS - Welsh League South

== Fourth round ==
Nine winners from the Third round and seven new clubs.

Tie no	Home	Score	Away
1	Chester (FL D3)	8–1	Kidderminster Harriers (SFL)

== Fifth round ==
Tie no	Home	Score	Away
1	Wrexham (FL D3)	0–0	Chester (FL D3)
replay	Chester (FL D3)	2–1	Wrexham (FL D3)

== Semifinal ==
Hereford won the tie by penalties 5–4.

Tie no	Home	Score	Away
1	Hereford United (FL D3)	1–1	Shrewsbury Town (FL D4)
replay	Shrewsbury Town (FL D3)	1–1	Hereford United (FL D3)
2	Chester (FL D3)	0–0	Cardiff City (FL D3)
replay	Cardiff City (FL D3)	1–0	Chester (FL D3)

== Final ==
Tie no	Home	Score	Away
1	Hereford United (FL D3)	3–3	Cardiff City (FL D3)
1	Cardiff City (FL D3)	3–2	Hereford United (FL D3)
