= 1958–59 Welsh Cup =

Tournament details
- Country: Wales

Final positions
- Champions: (Wales) Cardiff City
- Runners-up: (Wales) Lovell's Athletic

The 1958–59 FAW Welsh Cup is the 72nd season of the annual knockout tournament for competitive football teams in Wales.

== Key ==
League name pointed after clubs name.

- B&DL - Birmingham & District League
- FL D2 - Football League Second Division
- FL D3 - Football League Third Division
- FL D4 - Football League Fourth Division
- SFL - Southern Football League

== Fifth round ==
Ten winners from the Fourth round and six new clubs.

Tie no	Home	Score	Away
1	Chester (FL D4)	1–4	Rhyl (CCL)

== Semifinal ==
Bangor City and Lovell's Athletic played at Wrexham, replay at Newtown; Cardiff City and Wrexham played at Shrewsbury.

Tie no	Home	Score	Away
1	Bangor City (SFL)	0–0	Lovell's Athletic (WLS D1)
replay	Bangor City (SFL	1–2	Lovell's Athletic (WLS D1)
2	Cardiff City (FL D2)	6–0	Wrexham (FL D3)

== Final ==
Final were held at Newport.

Tie no	Home	Score	Away
1	Cardiff City (FL D2)	2–0	Lovell's Athletic (WLS D1)
