= 1970–71 Welsh Cup =

Tournament details
- Country: Wales

Final positions
- Champions: (Wales) Cardiff City
- Runners-up: (Wales) Wrexham

The 1970–71 FAW Welsh Cup is the 84th season of the annual knockout tournament for competitive football teams in Wales.

== Key ==
League name pointed after clubs name.

- CCL - Cheshire County League
- FL D2 - Football League Second Division
- FL D3 - Football League Third Division
- FL D4 - Football League Fourth Division
- SFL - Southern Football League
- WLN - Welsh League North
- WLS - Welsh League South

== Fifth round ==
Nine winners from the Fourth round and seven new clubs.

Tie no	Home	Score	Away
1	Chester (FL D4)	1–1	Rhyl (CCL)
replay	Rhyl (CCL)	0–2	Chester (FL D4)

== Sixth round ==
Tie no	Home	Score	Away
1	Chester (FL D4)	2–1	Swansea Town (FL D3)

== Semifinal ==
Tie no	Home	Score	Away
1	Cardiff City (FL D2)	0–0	Chester (FL D4)
replay	Chester (FL D4)	1–2	Cardiff City (FL D2)
2	Oswestry Town (CCL)	0–2	Wrexham (FL D3)

== Final ==
Tie no	Home	Score	Away
1	Wrexham (FL D3)	0–1	Cardiff City (FL D2)
1	Cardiff City (FL D2)	3–1	Wrexham (FL D3)
