= 1968–69 Welsh Cup =

Tournament details
- Country: Wales

Final positions
- Champions: (Wales) Cardiff City
- Runners-up: (Wales) Swansea Town

The 1968–69 FAW Welsh Cup is the 82nd season of the annual knockout tournament for competitive football teams in Wales.

== Key ==
League name pointed after clubs name.

- CCL - Cheshire County League
- FL D2 - Football League Second Division
- FL D3 - Football League Third Division
- FL D4 - Football League Fourth Division
- SFL - Southern Football League
- WLN - Welsh League North
- WLS - Welsh League South

== Fifth round ==
Ten winners from the Fourth round and six new clubs.

Tie no	Home	Score	Away
1	Rhyl (CCL)	0–3	Chester (FL D4)

== Sixth round ==
Tie no	Home	Score	Away
1	Chester (FL D4)	5–1	Lovell's Athletic (WLS)

== Semifinal ==
Tie no	Home	Score	Away
1	Swansea Town (FL D4)	1–0	Hereford United (SFL)
2	Chester (FL D4)	0–2	Cardiff City (FL D2)

== Final ==
Tie no	Home	Score	Away
1	Swansea Town (FL D4)	1–3	Cardiff City (FL D2)
1	Cardiff City (FL D2)	2–0	Swansea Town (FL D4)
