= 1987–88 Welsh Cup =

Welsh football competition

The 1987–88 Welsh Cup winners were Cardiff City. The final was played at the Vetch Field in Swansea in front of an attendance of 5,465.

== Semi-finals – first leg ==
Tie no	Home team	Score	Away team
1	Cardiff City	2–1	Caernarfon Town
2	Kidderminster Harriers	1–2	Wrexham

== Semi-finals – second leg ==
Tie no	Home team	Score	Away team
1	Caernarfon Town	0–1	Cardiff City
2	Wrexham	3–2	Kidderminster Harriers

== Final ==
18 May 1988
15:00

Cardiff City	2–0	Wrexham
Gilligan; Curtis

Vetch Field, Swansea
Attendance: 5,465
Referee: Roger Gifford(Llanbradach)

Cardiff City	Wrexham
