= 1986–87 Welsh Cup =

Football competition

The 1986–87 Welsh Cup winners were Merthyr Tydfil. The final and replay were played at Ninian Park in Cardiff in front of attendances of 7,000 and 6,010 respectively.

== Semi-finals – first leg ==
| Tie no | Home team | Score | Away team |
|---|---|---|---|
| 1 | Newport County | 2–1 | Wrexham |
| 2 | Merthyr Tydfil | 1–0 | Bangor City |

== Semi-finals – second leg ==
| Tie no | Home team | Score | Away team |
|---|---|---|---|
| 1 | Wrexham | 2–2 | Newport County |
| 2 | Bangor City | 1–0 (2−4p) | Merthyr Tydfil |

== Final ==
17 May 1987
15:00

| Merthyr Tydfil | 2–2 | Newport County |
|---|---|---|
| Latchford; Webley | | Thackeray 2 |

Ninian Park, Cardiff
Attendance: 7,000
Referee: F Roberts (Prestatyn)

| Merthyr Tydfil | Newport County |

== Replay ==
21 May 1987
19:45

| Merthyr Tydfil | 1–0 | Newport County |
|---|---|---|
| Baird |

Ninian Park, Cardiff
Attendance: 6,010
Referee: F Roberts (Prestatyn)

| Merthyr Tydfil | Newport County |
