= 1929–30 Welsh Cup =

Tournament details
- Country: Wales

Final positions
- Champions: Rhyl
- Runners-up: Cardiff City

The 1929–30 FAW Welsh Cup is the 49th season of the annual knockout tournament for competitive football teams in Wales.

== Key ==
League name pointed after clubs name.

- B&DL - Birmingham & District League
- CCL - Cheshire County League
- FL D2 - Football League Second Division
- FL D3N - Football League Third Division North
- FL D3S - Football League Third Division South
- SFL - Southern Football League
- WLN - Welsh League North
- WLS - Welsh League South

== Third round ==
Tie no	Home	Score	Away
1	Chester (CCL)	2–1	Holywell Arcadians

== Fourth round ==
Tie no	Home	Score	Away
1	Colwyn Bay	4–4	Chester (CCL)
replay	Colwyn Bay	4–2	Chester (CCL)

== Fifth round ==
Eight winners from the Fourth round and eight new clubs.

== Semifinal ==
Match between Rhyl and Colwyn bay were held at Llandudno.

Tie no	Home	Score	Away
1	Wrexham (FL D3N)	0–2	Cardiff City (FL D2)
2	Rhyl	3–1	Colwyn Bay

== Final ==
Final were held at Shrewsbury, replay - at Wrexham.

Tie no	Home	Score	Away
1	Rhyl	0–0	Cardiff City (FL D2)
replay	Rhyl	2–4	Cardiff City (FL D2)
