= 1988–89 Welsh Cup =

Football competition

The 1988–89 Welsh Cup winners were Swansea City. The final was played at the Vetch Field in Swansea in front of an attendance of 5,100.

== Semi-finals – first Lleg ==
Tie no	Home team	Score	Away team
1	Barry Town	0–1	Swansea City
2	Kidderminster Harriers	1–0	Hereford United

== Semi-finals – second leg ==
Tie no	Home team	Score	Away team
1	Swansea City	2–1	Barry Town
2	Hereford United	0–0	Kidderminster Harriers

== Final ==
21 May 1989
15:00

Swansea City	5–0	Kidderminster Harriers
Wade; James; Raynor; Hutchison; Thornber

Vetch Field, Swansea
Attendance: 5,100
Referee: J W Lloyd (Wrexham)

Swansea City	Kidderminster Harriers
