= 1973–74 Welsh Cup =

Tournament details
- Country: Wales

Final positions
- Champions: (Wales) Cardiff City
- Runners-up: (England) Stourbridge

The 1973–74 FAW Welsh Cup is the 87th season of the annual knockout tournament for competitive football teams in Wales.

== Key ==
League name pointed after clubs name.

- CCL - Cheshire County League
- FL D2 - Football League Second Division
- FL D3 - Football League Third Division
- FL D4 - Football League Fourth Division
- NPL - Northern Premier League
- SFL - Southern Football League
- WLN - Welsh League North
- WLS - Welsh League South

== Fourth round ==
Nine winners from the Third round and seven new clubs.

| Tie no | Home | Score | Away |
|---|---|---|---|
| 1 | Chester (FL D4) | 2–1 | Bethesda Athletic (WLN) |

== Fifth round ==
| Tie no | Home | Score | Away |
|---|---|---|---|
| 1 | Wrexham (FL D3) | 1–0 | Chester (FL D4) |

== Semifinal ==
| Tie no | Home | Score | Away |
|---|---|---|---|
| 1 | Wrexham (FL D3) | 1–2 | Stourbridge (SFL) |
| 2 | Shrewsbury Town (FL D3) | 1–2 | Cardiff City (FL D2) |

== Final ==
| Tie no | Home | Score | Away |
|---|---|---|---|
| 1 | Stourbridge (SFL) | 0–1 | Cardiff City (FL D2) |
| 1 | Cardiff City (FL D2) | 1–0 | Stourbridge (SFL) |
