= 1957–58 Welsh Cup =

Tournament details
- Country: Wales

Final positions
- Champions: (Wales) Wrexham
- Runners-up: (England) Chester

The 1957–58 FAW Welsh Cup is the 71st season of the annual knockout tournament for competitive football teams in Wales.

== Key ==
League name pointed after clubs name.

- B&DL - Birmingham & District League
- FL D2 - Football League Second Division
- FL D3N - Football League Third Division North
- FL D3S - Football League Third Division South
- SFL - Southern Football League

== Fifth round ==
Ten winners from the Fourth round and six new clubs.

Tie no	Home	Score	Away
1	Oswestry Town (B&DL)	1–3	Chester (FL D3N)

== Sixth round ==
Tie no	Home	Score	Away
1	Chester (FL D3N)	2–0	Swansea Town (FL D2)

== Semifinal ==
Chester and Hereford United played at Wrexham, replay - at Swansea, Caernarfon Town and Wrexham played at Bangor.

Tie no	Home	Score	Away
1	Chester (FL D3N)	1–1	Hereford United (SFL)
replay	Chester (FL D3N)	2–0	Hereford United (SFL)
2	Caernarfon Town (WLN)	2–4	Wrexham (FL D3N)

== Final ==
Final were held at Chester, replay - at Wrexham.

Tie no	Home	Score	Away
1	Chester (FL D3N)	1–1	Wrexham (FL D3N)
replay	Wrexham (FL D3N)	2–1	Chester (FL D3N)
