= Borough United F.C. =

Former association football club in Wales

Borough United
- Full name: Borough United Football Club
- Founded: 1954
- Dissolved: 1967
- Ground: Nant-y-Coed
- Chairman: J. Neville Houghton
- President: Clifford Ogle
Home colours

Borough United were a minor Welsh football club based in Llandudno Junction who caused a shock by winning the Welsh Cup in 1963 before performing much better than anticipated in European football.

== History ==
=== Early years ===
The club was formed in 1954 by a merger of two struggling neighbouring clubs Llandudno Junction (who had previously been successful in their league but had fallen into financial difficulties) and Conwy Borough; various names were touted, including Junction United, Conway [sic] and Llandudno Junction United, and Conway Borough and District; one player on National Service cheekily suggested Conjunction.

The club was soon established as a strong side in the Welsh League North, winning the title in 1958–59 and 1962–63. In the latter season, the club also recorded their Welsh cup triumph, with victories over Rhyl, Denbigh Town, cup holders Bangor City and Hereford United setting up a final with Football League side Newport County In the two-legged final the club won 2–1 at home and drew 0–0 at Somerton Park to secure the win.

=== European football ===
As a consequence of the success the club qualified for the UEFA Cup Winners' Cup and faced Sliema Wanderers of Malta in the first round. A 0–0 draw in Malta was followed by a 2–0 success at the Racecourse Ground in Wrexham — a more suitable venue than the tiny Nant-y-Coed ground with its single stand and spartan changing rooms — to set up a tie with ŠK Slovan Bratislava of Czechoslovakia. Borough were defeated 1–0 at Wrexham before losing 3–0 in Bratislava. The results were no disgrace, as the part-timers of Borough United had played well against a club that fielded five full internationals. Their win against Sliema Wanderers was the first time a Welsh club had won a round in a major European Competition.

The club enjoyed financial support and administration from a local businessman J.R. "Bob" Bithell, a successful haulage contractor, garage owner and builder involved in construction of buildings such as the Crosville Garage in Llandudno Junction, Vale Laundry, the Drill Hall in Conwy as well as dozens of homes. Bithell supported the construction of the stand at the Nant-y-Coed ground, changing rooms and toilets. He paid for much of the kit and helped players with travel costs especially when Borough played in Europe. Bithell also had several coaches at the time (Blue Coaches of Llandudno that had formally been Royal Blue Coaches, Oswald Road Garage, Llandudno Junction) and his coaches did much of the team transportation when playing away.

=== Demise ===
The club continued as a top five side in their league until the 1966–67 season, when at the start of the season the club received notice to quit Nant-y-Coed by its owners, the Irish Oblates of Mary Immaculate order, the notice to take effect in 1969; the Order had only bought the ground 5 years before. The club's final match was a 1–0 home defeat to Prestatyn, which ominously drew the club's smallest gate, a mere £7, put down to a mix of appalling weather and the game clashing with the 1967 Grand National.

With the season over, the club was free to consider alternative grounds, but the £9,000 cost to bring the former Conwy Borough ground, Morfa, up to standard being too high. The club therefore quit the Welsh League and dissolved. An attempt to continue by merging with Llandudno F.C. and joining the Cheshire Football League, under the name Llandudno Borough United, was vetoed by the Welsh Football Association. The name was briefly continued by an amateur side in the Vale of Conwy League.

== Colours ==
The club wore maroon shirts with white trim, and white shorts and socks, taken from the Llandudno Junction colours.

== Ground ==
The club's ground, Nant-y-Coed, had been Llandudno Junction's ground, had been agreed upon even before the club name had been chosen. The club's notice to quit stated that the Order required the ground for a dormitory, but in the end the Order did not use the land. The area of the ground is now under Parc Castell.

== Honours ==
- Welsh National League (North)
  - Champions: 1958–59, 1962–63
  - Runners-up: 1959–60, 1964–65
- Welsh Cup – Winners: 1962–63
- North Wales Coast Challenge Cup
  - Winners: 1962–63, 1963–64
  - Runners-up: 1965–66
- Cookson Cup – Winners: 1962–63

== Notable players ==
- Mike Fields, who joined the club in 1959 from Chester
- Gerry Duffy, former Oldham Athletic forward, who played for the club in the mid-1960s
- Reg Hunter, who had two seasons with the club in the 1960s during a peripatetic career, mostly around north Wales
- Eric Morris, former Chester player who played in all of United's Cup-winners' Cup matches
