= Cardiff City F.C. =

Association football club in Cardiff, Wales

Cardiff City
- Full name: Cardiff City Football Club
- Nicknames: The Bluebirds; Yr Adar Gleision (Welsh)
- Short name: CAR, CCFC, City
- Founded: 1899; 127 years ago (as Riverside A.F.C.)
- Ground: Cardiff City Stadium
- Capacity: 33,316
- Owner: Vincent Tan
- Chairman: Mehmet Dalman
- Head coach: Brian Barry-Murphy
- League: EFL Championship
- 2025–26: EFL League One, 2nd of 24 (promoted)
- Website: cardiffcityfc.co.uk
Home colours	Away colours

Cardiff City Football Club (Welsh: Clwb Pêl-droed Dinas Caerdydd) is a professional association football club based in Cardiff, Wales. The club competes in the EFL Championship in the 2026–27 season following promotion. Founded in 1899 as Riverside A.F.C., the club changed its name to Cardiff City in 1908 and entered the Southern Football League in 1910 before joining the English Football League in 1920. The team has spent 17 seasons in the top tier of English football, the longest period being between 1921 and 1929. Their most recent season in the top flight was the 2018–19 Premier League season.

Cardiff City is the only team from outside England to have won the FA Cup, doing so in 1927. They have also reached three other cup finals in English competitions, the 1925 FA Cup final against Sheffield United, the 2008 FA Cup final against Portsmouth and the 2012 Football League Cup final against Liverpool, suffering defeat on each occasion. They have won the Welsh Cup on 22 occasions, making them the second-most successful team in the competition's history behind Wrexham.

With the exception of a short period this century, the team has played in home colours of blue and white since 1908, from which their nickname "The Bluebirds" derives. Cardiff's first permanent ground was Ninian Park, which opened in 1910; it remained in use for 99 years until the club moved into the Cardiff City Stadium in 2009. Cardiff has long-standing rivalries with nearby clubs Swansea City, with whom they contest the South Wales derby, and Bristol City, with whom they contest the Severnside derby. The club's record appearance holder is Billy Hardy, who made 590 appearances in a 20-year playing spell with Cardiff City, and their record goalscorer is Len Davies with 179 goals.

== History ==
=== Early years (1899–1920) ===
Following a meeting at the home of lithographic artist Bartley Wilson in Cardiff, the club was founded in 1899 as Riverside A.F.C. as a way of keeping players from the Riverside Cricket Club together and in shape during the winter months. In their first season, they played friendlies against local sides at their Sophia Gardens ground. In 1900 they joined the Cardiff & District League for their first competitive season. When King Edward VII granted Cardiff city status in 1905, the club put in a request to the South Wales and Monmouthshire Football Association to change their name to Cardiff City. The request was turned down as they were deemed not to be playing at a high enough level. To enhance their standing, the team arranged to join the South Wales League in 1906. Two years later they were granted permission to change the name of the club to Cardiff City.

Although growing in stature, the club was forced to turn down the opportunity to join the newly formed Second Division of the Southern Football League due to a lack of facilities at their Sophia Gardens ground. Over the next two years, Cardiff played friendlies against some of Britain's top professional sides, including Middlesbrough, Bristol City, and Crystal Palace. The matches were played at grounds in Cardiff and nearby towns so as to gauge the level of public interest in the team. The club eventually secured land to build their own stadium, Ninian Park, which was completed in 1910. The club turned professional the same year. They made their first signing the following year with the acquisition of Jack Evans from fellow Welsh side Cwmparc.

With the new ground in place, Cardiff joined the Southern Football League Second Division and appointed their first manager, Davy McDougall, who became player-manager. They went on to finish in fourth place in their first year in the league. The board decided to replace McDougall with Fred Stewart, who had previous managerial experience with Stockport County. He set about adopting a more professional approach, signing several players with Football League experience, including brothers John and George Burton and Billy Hardy. Stewart led the team to promotion in his second season by winning the Second Division title. They remained in the First Division for the next decade, and finished in the top four on two occasions.

=== 1920s success and later decline (1920–1945) ===
In 1920, the club submitted a successful application to join the Football League and were placed into the Second Division for the 1920–21 season. Stewart brought in several players with Football League experience, breaking the club's transfer record on two occasions to sign Jimmy Gill and later Jimmy Blair from The Wednesday. They played their first match in the Football League on 28 August 1920, defeating Stockport County 5–2. The side finished the season in second place to win promotion to the First Division. They finished behind Birmingham City on goal average, and reached the semi-final of the FA Cup. In their third season in the top-tier, the team finished runners-up to Huddersfield Town because of a goal average difference of 0.024. Cardiff drew their final match 0–0 as club record goalscorer Len Davies missed a penalty.

Yearly table position since Cardiff City joined the Football League

The following season was the first time Cardiff appeared at Wembley Stadium, having reached their first FA Cup final. The team lost 1–0 to Sheffield United following a goal from England international Fred Tunstall. The 1926–27 season, when they finished in 14th position, was Cardiff's worst performance in the top tier of English Football since winning promotion six seasons before. However, they reached their second FA Cup final in the space of two years. On St George's Day, 23 April 1927, at Wembley Stadium in London, Cardiff became the only non-English side to win the FA Cup by defeating Arsenal 1–0 in the final; Hughie Ferguson scored the only goal of the game in the 74th minute. He received the ball from Ernie Curtis and hurried a tame shot toward the goal; Dan Lewis, the Arsenal goalkeeper, allowed the shot to slip through his grasp and knocked the ball into the net with his elbow. Captain Fred Keenor received the FA Cup trophy at the end of the match from King George V only seven years after Cardiff City had entered the Football League. When the team returned to Cardiff the next day, a crowd of around 150,000 people lined the streets to welcome them.

The side also won the Welsh Cup in 1927, defeating Rhyl 2–0 and so becoming the only club to win the national cups of two countries in the same season. They went on to win the FA Charity Shield after beating amateur side the Corinthians 2–1 at Stamford Bridge. The club entered a period of decline after their cup success. They were relegated from the First Division in the 1928–29 season, despite conceding fewer goals than any other side in the division. They suffered a second relegation two years later, dropping into the Third Division South for the first time since they joined the Football League. During their first season in the division, Cardiff recorded their biggest-ever win when they beat Thames by a scoreline of 9–2. They finished the 1932–33 season in 19th place, resulting in manager Fred Stewart tendering his resignation from his post after 22 years in charge. Club founder Bartley Wilson stepped in to replace Stewart. Results continued to be disappointing, and in March 1934, Ben Watts-Jones was given the opportunity to manage the club he had supported as a youngster. He was unable to turn the team's fortunes around; they finished the season at the bottom of the table, and had to apply for re-election to the league. Watts-Jones remained in charge for another three years until Bill Jennings replaced him. Cardiff remained in the Third Division South until the Football League was suspended following the outbreak of World War II.

=== Post war and European competition (1945–2000) ===
In their first season since the resumption of the Football League, under new manager Billy McCandless, Cardiff finished the 1946–47 season as champions of the Third Division South and returned to the Second Division. McCandless left the club soon after and was replaced by Cyril Spiers who led the side to promotion in the 1951–52 season. Cardiff returned to the top tier of English football for the first time in 23 years and stayed there for five seasons. They were relegated after in 1957, after struggling in the bottom half of the table for three seasons. They returned to the First Division for two seasons between 1960 and 1962 before they were again relegated.

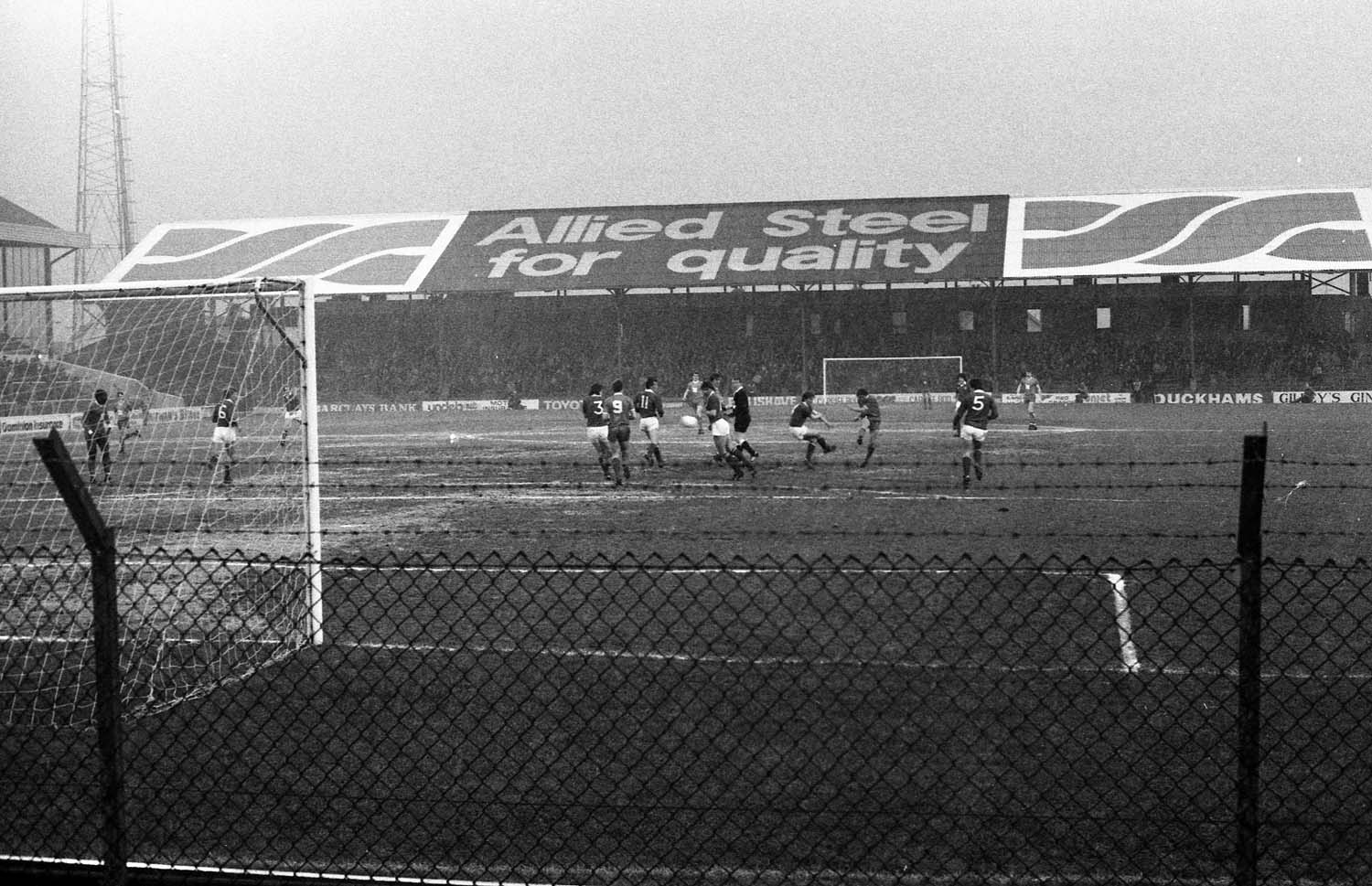
Cardiff City playing Oxford United at Ninian Park in 1983

During the 1960s, Cardiff participated in European competition for the first time as a result of winning the Welsh Cup, which granted qualification to the newly created European Cup Winners Cup. Their first ever match in European competition was in the tournament during the 1964–65 season against Danish side Esbjerg fB. The team won 1–0 on aggregate over two legs, the only goal being scored by Peter King. They went on to reach the quarter-finals before being knocked out by Real Zaragoza. Despite their exploits in Europe, the team were still struggling in league competition under the stewardship of Jimmy Scoular, finishing in 20th position in the Second Division. Two years later the team reached the semi-final of the Cup Winners Cup after victories over Shamrock Rovers, NAC Breda, and Torpedo Moscow set up a tie with German side Hamburg, whose squad contained several German internationals. This remains the furthest any Welsh side has advanced in European competition. After a 1–1 draw in the first leg, over 43,000 fans turned out at Ninian Park to watch Hamburg win 3–2. During the 1970–71 season, Cardiff reached the quarter-finals of the Cup Winners Cup where they faced Spanish side Real Madrid. The first leg of the tie was held at Ninian Park where 47,000 fans watched one of the most significant victories in Cardiff's history when Brian Clark headed in to give Cardiff a 1–0 win. They were later eliminated after losing the second leg 2–0. The team remained in the Second Division for 19 of the 20 seasons between 1962 and 1982, having been relegated to the Third Division for the 1975–76 season.

Cardiff were continuously in the lower two divisions of the Football League between 1985 and 1993. The club appointed several managers in attempts to turn the team's performances around with limited success. They were relegated to the Fourth Division once in the 1985–86 season and, despite returning to the Third Division on two occasions, they finished in their lowest-ever league position in 1996—22nd of 24 in Division Three. In 1995, Cardiff and other Welsh clubs competing in English leagues were banned from entering the Welsh Cup by the Football Association of Wales after pressure from UEFA, who did not want teams playing in two national cup competitions. Their final match in the competition was a 2–1 defeat to Wrexham in the 1995 final.

=== Foreign investment (2000–present) ===
In August 2000, Lebanese businessman Sam Hammam purchased control of the club and replaced Steve Borley as chairman. Shortly after taking over, he controversially pledged to get the entire Welsh nation to support Cardiff by renaming the club "The Cardiff Celts" and changing the club colours to green, red and white. After lengthy talks with senior players and fans, he decided the best policy was not to change the name of the club. The club crest was redesigned; the new design incorporated the Cardiff City bluebird in front of the Flag of Saint David and featured the club's nickname superimposed at the top of the crest. Hammam funded the transfers of several new players to the club, and new manager Lennie Lawrence guided Cardiff to promotion when they won the Second Division play-off in 2003 against Queens Park Rangers. Substitute Andy Campbell came off the bench to score the only goal in extra time and ensure Cardiff's return to Division One after an 18-year absence.

The club experienced increasing financial difficulties over the next few years and plans for a new stadium failed to gain approval from Cardiff Council because of concerns over financial security in 2006. Hammam then agreed to a takeover by a consortium led by new chairman Peter Ridsdale and the lead developer of the new stadium, Paul Guy. During the 2007–08 season, Cardiff reached the semi-final of the FA Cup for the first time in 81 years after beating Middlesbrough 2–0 on 9 March 2008. After coming through their semi-final against Barnsley with a 1–0 win at Wembley Stadium on 6 April with a goal from Joe Ledley, they eventually lost 1–0 to Portsmouth in the final, thanks to a goal from Nwankwo Kanu in the 37th minute.

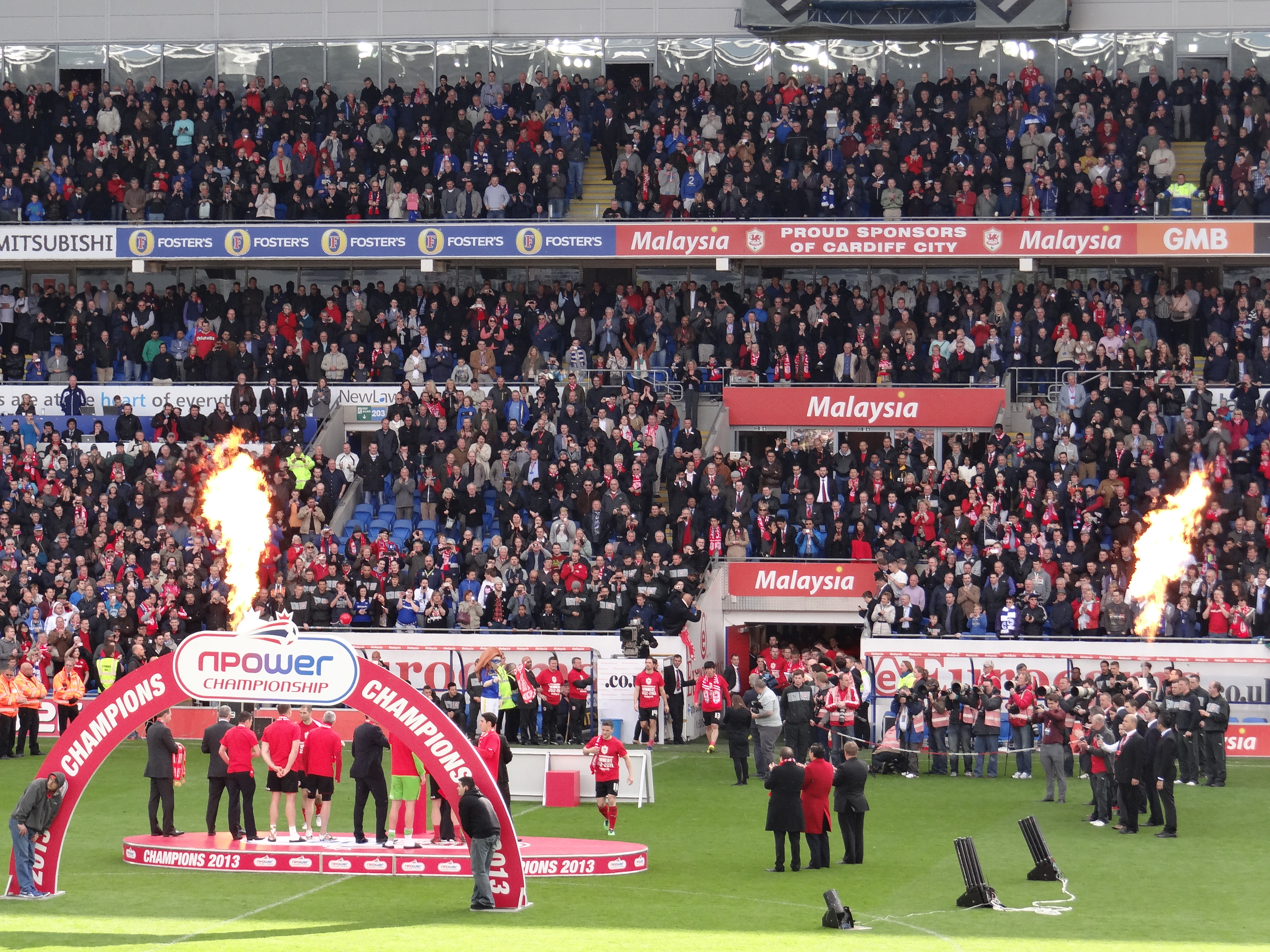
Cardiff won the 2012–13 Championship after defeating Bolton Wanderers in the final match.

In May 2010, Chan Tien Ghee took over as club chairman following a takeover bid by a Malaysian consortium; Vincent Tan also invested and joined the board. Tan later became the Cardiff's majority shareholder after buying out several other directors and acquired around 82% of the club's shares. In 2011, the club appointed Malky Mackay as manager. He took the side to the League Cup final for the first time in the club's history during his first season. The following season, Cardiff won the 2012–13 Championship title and with it gained promotion to the top tier of English football for the first time after 52 years. On 18 August 2013, Cardiff played their first ever away Premier League match against West Ham United, losing 2–0. Cardiff won only four games in the first half of the season and, on 27 December 2013, Mackay was sacked by Vincent Tan and replaced by Ole Gunnar Solskjær. Despite the change in management, Cardiff were relegated to the Championship after a single season following a 3–0 away defeat to Newcastle United. Solskjær himself was sacked on 18 September 2014 after a disappointing start to the following Championship season, and replaced by Leyton Orient manager Russell Slade.

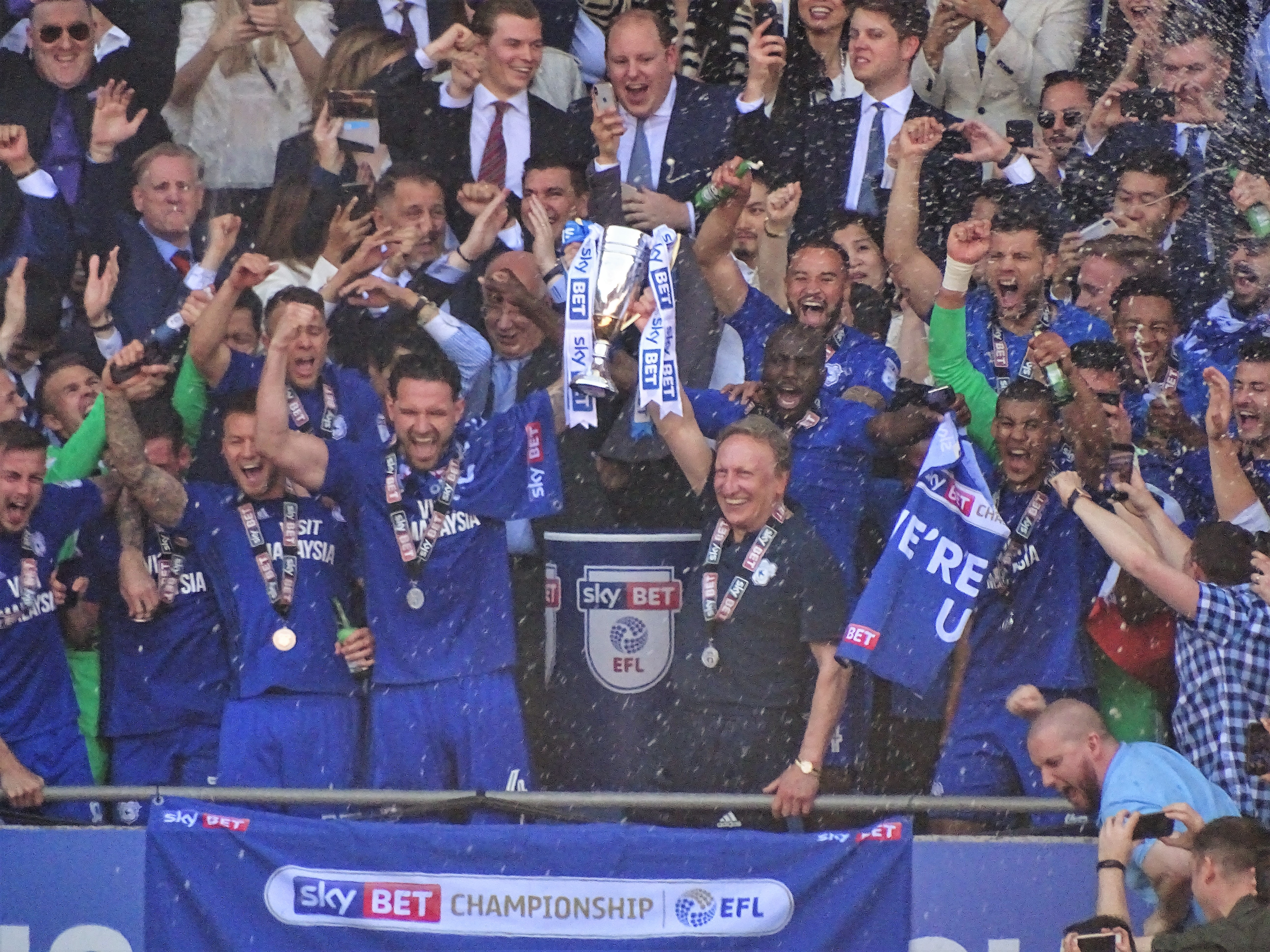
Manager Neil Warnock and players lift the 2017–18 EFL Championship runner-up trophy.

In October 2016, Neil Warnock was appointed first team manager of Cardiff. Warnock took over the team with Cardiff second from the bottom of the table after two wins from eleven games, and guided the side to a 12th-placed finish after a good run of form. The start of the 2017–18 season saw Cardiff break a club record by winning their opening three league games of a season, the first time in the club's 107-year professional history. They proceeded to clinch promotion to the Premier League after finishing second in the table. However, they were relegated back to the Championship after a single season.

Warnock resigned as manager in November 2019 following a poor start to the season and was replaced by Neil Harris. Harris guided Cardiff to a 5th-placed finish before suffering defeat in the Championship playoff semi-final. After a run of six straight defeats, Harris was sacked on 21 January 2021, beginning a chain of short-term hirings. His replacement, Mick McCarthy, was appointed the following day, but was relieved of his duties less than a year later with the side 2 points above relegation. The club's under–23 manager Steve Morison was appointed as caretaker manager before signing an 18-month contract after guiding the Bluebirds to safety. Morrison was sacked in September 2022 and replaced by Mark Hudson, who lasted only four months in the role before he too was dismissed in January 2023.

In December 2022, Cardiff City was issued with a transfer embargo by FIFA, which was lifted in January 2023. The club also appealed against an embargo from the English Football League which prevented it paying fees for players until May 2024.

In March 2023, Cardiff City reported an operating loss of £29 million for the 2021–22 season.

In June 2023, Erol Bulut was appointed as Cardiff manager. However, in September 2024, he was sacked, as Cardiff started the 2024/2025 Championship Season with six consecutive winless games. His replacement (and previous assistant manager), Omer Riza, lasted until April 2025. After this, Aaron Ramsey took charge on an interim basis until the end of the season. Later on, in April 2025, Cardiff City got relegated to League One. This led to the Supporters' Trust calling for an urgent meeting with Vincent Tan, saying "big changes are needed... to avoid a further downward spiral in the fortunes of the club" in an official statement.

== Supporters ==
Cardiff has a large catchment area from which to draw its supporter base. With only two professional teams (Swansea City and Newport County) sharing the South Wales region, the club enjoys considerable support from both the city of Cardiff and the surrounding South Wales Valleys. As a Welsh club playing in the English football league system, national identity is believed to be a major factor in fan support, and some of the club's matches are considered to be Welsh cross-border rivalries with England. During the 1980s, as the club struggled in the lower divisions of English football, crowds dropped to an average of 3,000 per match. An increase in the club's fortunes saw a steady improvement in crowd numbers. The average attendance at home matches rose from 3,594 to 12,522 between 1997 and 2002. Promotion to the second tier in 2003 brought further increases in numbers. The opening of the Cardiff City Stadium led to average attendances reaching 20,000 fans, culminating with highs of between 28,000 and 31,000 during two seasons in the Premier League. Despite this increase, the club has often been regarded as attracting fewer spectators than similarly placed teams. This has been attributed to several factors such as the club's controversial change to red shirts between 2012 and 2015—some supporters being perceived as fairweather fans, and a lack of atmosphere.

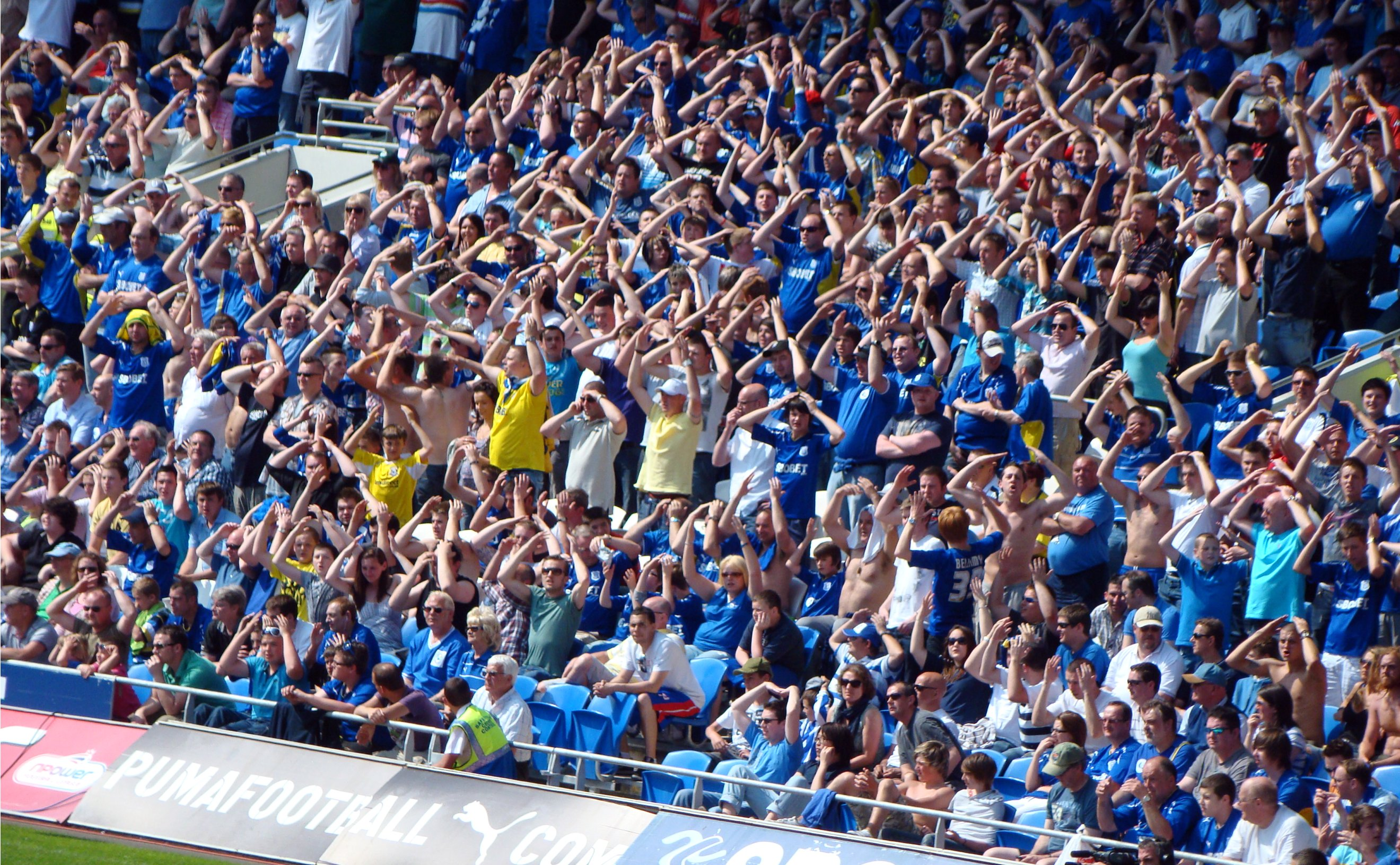
Cardiff City fans performing "the Ayatollah" in 2011

Welsh national identity also contributes to the supporter culture of the club. "Men of Harlech", a song largely made famous by the 1964 film Zulu, which depicted a battle involving a Welsh regiment, and "I'll Be There", a take on a miner's song that was popular during the 1926 United Kingdom general strike, are both frequently sung before and during matches. The Ayatollah, an act involving raising both arms up and down above the head in a patting motion, has become synonymous with the club and its supporters as a celebratory gesture since its adoption in the early 1990s. The action has become popular with Cardiff fans outside football to show support for the club with boxer Nathan Cleverly, Olympic swimmer David Davies and rugby player Gareth Thomas all having performed the action at some points of their careers.

== Rivalries ==
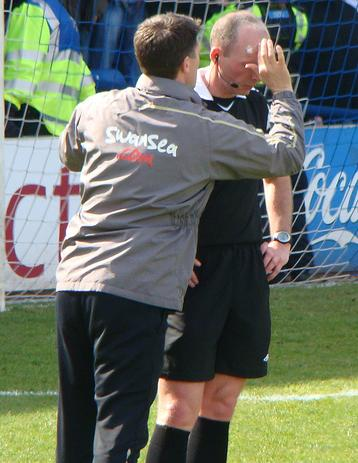
Referee Mike Dean receiving treatment after being struck by a projectile in a South Wales derby in 2009

Known as the South Wales derby, Cardiff City's most significant rivalry is with nearby neighbours Swansea City, and over 100 games have been played in all competitions between the sides. Swansea's first competitive match following their founding in 1912 was against Cardiff in the Southern Football League. The rivalry had been relatively friendly until the 1970s and 1980s. Economic issues, such as the UK miners' strike, rivalry between the two cities and an increase in football hooliganism led to numerous violent clashes between fans at the matches. One game in 1993 was dubbed "The Battle of Ninian Park" for its particularly severe violence and resulted in away fans being banned from attending any matches between the sides for four years. Cardiff player Jason Perry described the period as "the dark, dark days of the derby". When the ban was dropped, "bubble trips" were introduced for away fans who could only attend matches via police-escorted convoys to and from the stadium.

Further political divide between the two cities was caused by the Welsh devolution referendum in 1997 when Cardiff was chosen as the site for the newly created Senedd, despite the majority of the city voting against devolution. Swansea, which largely voted in favour of devolution, received funding for a national swimming pool instead. Alan Curtis, who played for both sides, commented, "I think Cardiff has always been perceived [...] to receive whatever funding is going around. It seems to me that everything gets channelled in that direction". Further afield, the club has a rivalry with Bristol City, known as the Severnside derby, and to a lesser extent, Bristol Rovers. There is also a lesser rivalry with Welsh neighbours Newport County due to the proximity of the two Welsh cities; they have rarely played against each other since the 1980s due to Cardiff being in higher leagues. In total, they have only ever played 20 Football League games against each other. A survey by Football Fans Census in 2003 saw Swansea, Bristol City, and Newport listed as Cardiff's main three rivalries, with Stoke City matching Newport in third.

In the 1980s, a hooligan group known as the Soul Crew emerged from within the club's fanbase. The group became notorious for their violent clashes with rival supporters and brawls between sets of supporters at football matches and other events.

== Stadium ==
=== Ninian Park ===
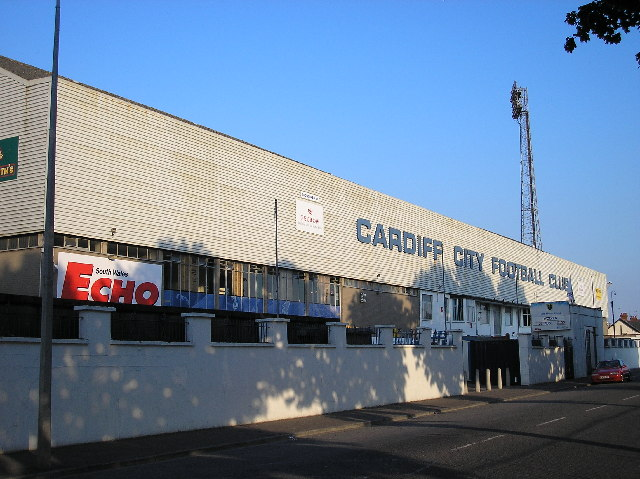
The front of Ninian Park in 2005

Cardiff's first ground was at Sophia Gardens recreational park, where the team played from their founding in 1899 until 1910. With increasing support for the club, Bartley Wilson contacted Bute Estate, who owned large amounts of Cardiff at the time, in an attempt to find land suitable for building a stadium. They eventually agreed on an area of waste ground on Sloper Road. The land was a former rubbish tip and required extensive work to get a playable surface, but with the assistance of Cardiff Corporation and volunteers, the work was completed. The original intention was to name the ground Sloper Park, but Ninian Park was chosen instead after Lord Ninian Crichton-Stuart, who was a driving force behind the ground's construction. The ground hosted its first match on 1 September 1910 with a friendly against Aston Villa; Lord Crichton-Stuart ceremonially kicked off the game.

The stadium was built with one stand. A second, which replaced an earth embankment and could hold 18,000 people, was opened in 1928. It hosted its first international match in March 1911 with a Welsh match against Scotland. Towards the end of its lifespan, the ground was replaced for international fixtures by Cardiff Arms Park as doubts mounted over the safety of the aging ground. The club's record attendance in the ground is 57,893 which was achieved during a league match against Arsenal on 22 April 1953. The scaling down of grounds throughout the 1970s and 1980s due to safety fears, which saw the ground capacity fall to 22,000, meant that the record stood until the ground's closure. In its final years of use, the club was forced to seek special dispensation from authorities to keep the remaining standing areas of the ground open beyond the three-year period given to clubs at Championship level or above to remove them.

=== Cardiff City Stadium ===
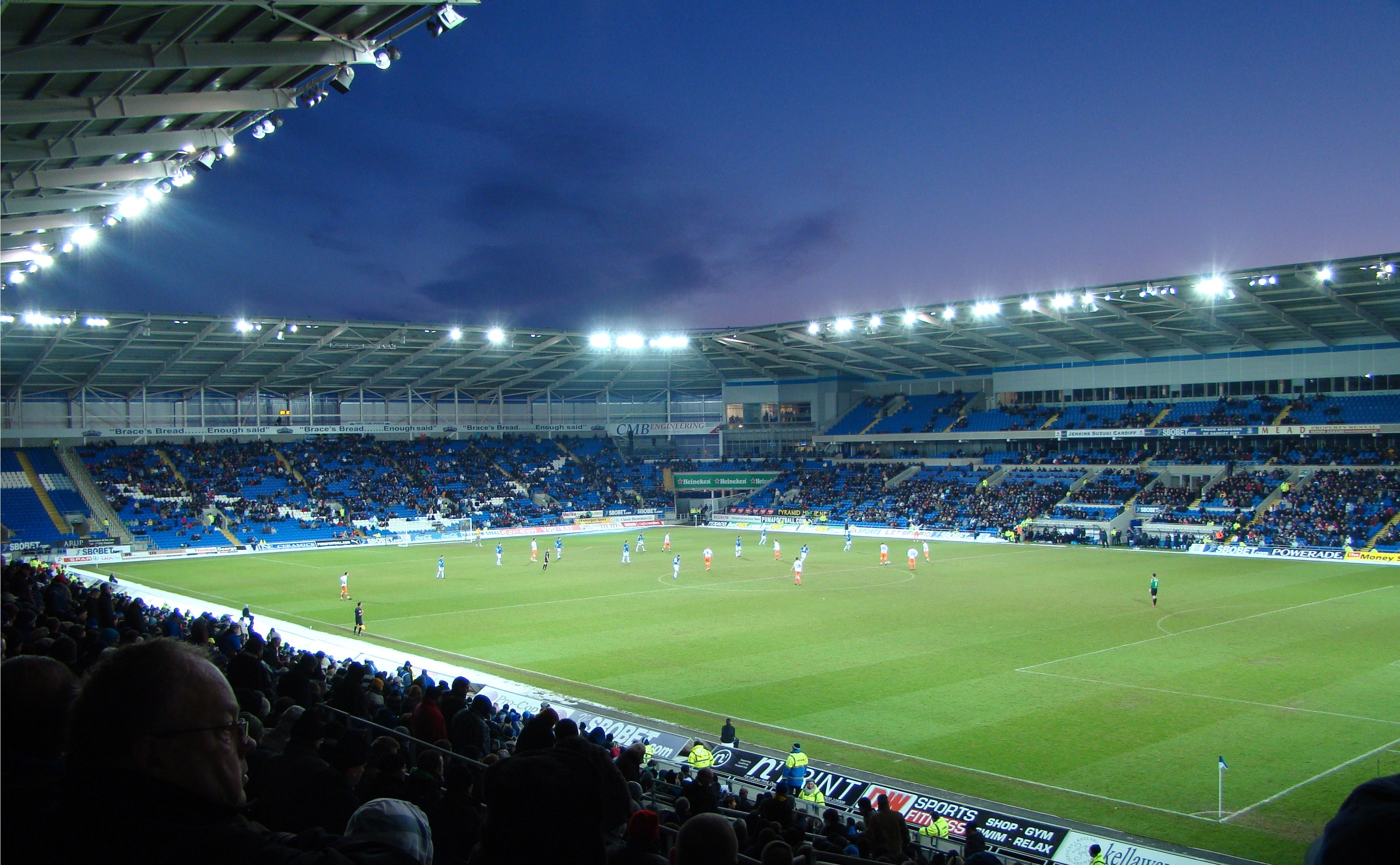
Cardiff City Stadium pitch in 2010

In June 2009, the club completed construction of a 26,828-seat stadium on the site of the now-demolished old Cardiff Athletics Stadium at a cost of £48 million. The ground was named the "Cardiff City Stadium". Three of the four stands retained the names used at Ninian Park—the Grange End, the Canton Stand and the Grandstand—and the fourth stand was named the Ninian Stand. The ground's naming rights were expected to be sold, the club hoping to generate up to £9 million income; they remain unsold. Although a pre-season friendly against Chasetown was played at the ground with limited capacity to test safety features, the stadium was officially opened with a friendly against Scottish side Celtic on 22 July 2009. The first competitive match played at the ground was on 8 August 2009, the opening day of the 2009–10 season, as Cardiff won 4–0 over Scunthorpe United. When it opened, the Cardiff Blues rugby union club left their Cardiff Arms Park home to share the new stadium with Cardiff City. The move proved unpopular among fans of the rugby club, which returned to Cardiff Arms Park in 2012.

A few years after the stadium was built, plans to upgrade and expand the stadium were initiated. The expansion plans were completed in August 2014, and the seating capacity was raised to 33,316. In March 2015, it was announced that the Ninian Stand extension was to be shut for the 2015–16 season due to poor ticket sales, dropping the capacity to 27,978. It was reopened the following year due to an increase in demand.

In February 2023, the stadium was awarded the Level Playing Field's Centre of Excellence Award in recognition of its accessible facilities and services.

== Colours, kit and crest ==
=== Colours ===
When Riverside A.F.C. was formed in 1899, the club used a chocolate-brown and amber checkered shirt. Following the club's name change to Cardiff City in 1908, they adopted a blue shirt and white or blue shorts and socks, although for the first nine years black socks were used. Kit changes over the club's history have included all blue kits, the introduction of a yellow vertical stripe during the 1970s, and alternating blue stripes.

In 2012, Vincent Tan controversially changed Cardiff's home kit colours from the traditional blue and white to red and black, the first time the club had not worn blue as its primary colour since 1908. The crest was also changed to one in which the Welsh Dragon was more prominent than the traditional bluebird. These changes were made to "appeal in 'international markets'" as part of a "major investment plan" unveiled by chairman Vincent Tan. The rebranding provoked strong opposition from the fans, who organised protest marches and demonstrations to voice their displeasure at the changes. Despite Tan previously stating that the club would only return to wearing blue if another owner was found, on 9 January 2015, after three seasons playing in the red kit, the club reverted its home kit back to blue with a red away kit in a bid to "unite" the club.

Original strip used as Riverside A.F.C. before 1908
Cardiff's original colours from 1908 until the 1920s
Cardiff's lighter blue strip used between 1926 and 1930
Dark blue shirts returned between 1930 and 1992.
All blue kits were used in 1992–1996 and 2000–2007
The 2009–10 strip with yellow being re-added
Cardiff briefly wore red between 2012 and 2015.
Cardiff reverted to blue during the 2014–15 season.

=== Crest history ===
From 1908 Cardiff played in unadorned shirts. This changed in 1959 when they played in shirts with a simple crest featuring an image of a bluebird. The following season their shirts were plain and unadorned and remained so until 1965 when they played in shirts with the word "Bluebirds" embroidered. A new crest, similar to the one used previously, and again featuring a bluebird, was introduced in 1969. Variations of this crest have been used over the years. In the 1980s, extra features including words and motifs were added. A major change was made in 2012, when owner Vincent Tan attempted to rebrand the club to expand its appeal outside Wales. This change gave large prominence to the Welsh Dragon, reducing the bluebird to a minor feature. In March 2015, Cardiff announced a new crest which would once again feature the Bluebird predominantly with a Chinese dragon replacing the standard Welsh dragon. In 2024, the crest was changed for the 125th anniversary of the club. The change saw the bluebird within the previous crest become the main feature in a white circle with a blue outline.

=== Kit manufacturers and shirt sponsors ===
Period	Kit manufacturer	Shirt sponsor
1973–82	Umbro	None
1983	Umbro	Whitbread Wales
1984	Umbro	Superted Camilleri Roofing
1984–85	Umbro	Merthyr Motor Auctions
1985–87	Admiral	Airways Cymru
1987–88	Admiral	Buckley's Brewery
1988–89	Scoreline	Buckley's Brewery
1989–90	Scoreline	Havelet
1990–91	Scoreline	None
1991–92	Influence	None
1992–94	Bluebirds	South Wales Echo
1994–95	Strika	South Wales Echo
1995–96	Influence	South Wales Echo
1996–97	Lotto	South Wales Echo
1997–98	Errea	Gilesports
1998–99	Xara	Sports Cafe
1999–2000	Xara	Modplan
2000–02	Xara	Ken Thorne Group
2002–03	Puma	Leekes
2003–05	Puma	Redrow Homes
2005–06	Joma	Redrow Homes
2006–08	Joma	Communications Direct
2008–09	Joma	Vansdirect
2009–10	Puma	777.com
2009–10	Puma	SBOBET
2009–10	Puma	SBOBET
2010–11	Puma	SBOBET
2011–14	Puma	Visit Malaysia
2014–15	Cosway Sports	Visit Malaysia
2015–22	Adidas	Visit Malaysia
2022–26	New Balance	Visit Malaysia
2026–	Castore	Visit Malaysia

== Players ==
=== First-team squad ===
As of 19 September 2026

Note: Flags indicate national team as defined under FIFA eligibility rules; some limited exceptions apply. Players may hold more than one non-FIFA nationality.

No.	Pos.	Nation	Player
1	GK	ENG	Nathan Trott
2	DF	ENG	Will Fish
3	DF	IRL	Joel Bagan
4	DF	NGR	Gabriel Osho
5	DF	POL	Krystian Bielik
8	MF	IRL	Jack Moylan
9	FW	DEN	Yousef Salech
10	MF	WAL	Rubin Colwill (vice-captain)
11	FW	ENG	Ollie Tanner
12	DF	ENG	Calum Chambers (captain)
14	MF	SCO	David Turnbull
16	MF	ENG	Chris Willock
18	MF	AUS	Alex Robertson

No.	Pos.	Nation	Player
23	DF	ENG	Calum Scanlon (on loan from Liverpool)
27	MF	WAL	Joel Colwill
30	GK	ENG	Harry Tyrer
33	MF	WAL	Rob Tankiewicz
38	DF	SGP	Perry Ng
39	FW	WAL	Isaak Davies
40	DF	WAL	Noah Anyadike
41	GK	WAL	Matthew Turner
43	MF	WAL	Paul Moreno
44	DF	WAL	Ronan Kpakio
45	MF	WAL	Cian Ashford
47	FW	IRL	Callum Robinson
48	DF	WAL	Dylan Lawlor

=== Out on loan ===
Note: Flags indicate national team as defined under FIFA eligibility rules; some limited exceptions apply. Players may hold more than one non-FIFA nationality.

No.	Pos.	Nation	Player
—	DF	NOR	Jesper Daland (on loan at Viking until 31 January 2027)
—	FW	CRO	Roko Simic (on loan at Magdeburg until 30 June 2027)
—	FW	WAL	Tanatswa Nyakuhwa (on loan at Newport County until 30 June 2027)
—	FW	ENG	Kion Etete (on loan at Newport County until 30 June 2027)
—	DF	WAL	Luey Giles (on loan at Kidderminster Harriers until 30 June 2027)

=== Retired numbers ===
Note: Flags indicate national team as defined under FIFA eligibility rules; some limited exceptions apply. Players may hold more than one non-FIFA nationality.

No.	Pos.	Nation	Player
7	MF	ENG	Peter Whittingham (2007–2017)

=== Under-23 and Academy ===
Cardiff runs a youth academy catering to groups from ages seven to eighteen years. Recent players to come through the youth system include Wales internationals: Joe Ledley, Chris Gunter, Aaron Ramsey, Adam Matthews, Darcy Blake, Declan John, Rabbi Matondo, Mark Harris, Rubin Colwill, Joel Colwill, Dylan Lawlor, Ronan Kpakio, Isaak Davies and prior to the youth system being granted academy status, Robert Earnshaw and James Collins.

== Backroom staff ==
Position	Name
Head Coach	Brian Barry-Murphy
Assistant Head Coach	Lee Riley
Head of Performance	Kevin Gibbins
First Team Coach	Réda Johnson
Goalkeeping Coach	Craig Samson
Physical Performance Coach	Scott Wickens
Head of Analysis	Joe Hamilton
First Team Analyst	Oli Moulton
Data Analyst	Rob Clarke
Head of Medical Services	James Rowland
Medical Director	Professor Len Noakes
First Team Doctors	Dr. Nick Roach; Dr. Will Redmond; Dr. Lamah El-Sharkawi
Senior Physiotherapist	Chris Lewis
First Team Physiotherapists	Liam Donovan; Ryan Harrison
Club Psychologist	Dr. Mikel Mellick
Kit Manager	David Bush
Head of Recruitment	Patrick Deboys
Head of Football Operations	Lee Southernwood
Operations Assistant	Keiran Dixon

== Manager history ==
Name	Nat	From	To
Davy McDougall	(Scotland)	1910	1911
Fred Stewart	(England)	1911	1933
Bartley Wilson	(England)	1933	1934
Ben Watts-Jones	(Wales)	1934	1937
Bill Jennings	(Wales)	1937	1939
Cyril Spiers	(England)	1939	1946
Billy McCandless	(Northern Ireland)	1946	1948
Cyril Spiers	(England)	1948	1954
Trevor Morris	(Wales)	1954	1958
Bill Jones	(Wales)	1958	1962
George Swindin	(England)	1962	1964
Jimmy Scoular	(Scotland)	1964	1973
Lew Clayton (caretaker)	(England)	1973	1973
Frank O'Farrell	(Republic of Ireland)	1973	1974
Jimmy Andrews	(Scotland)	1974	1978
Richie Morgan	(Wales)	1978	1981
Graham Williams	(Wales)	1981	1982
Len Ashurst	(England)	1982	1984
Jimmy Goodfellow & Jimmy Mullen (caretakers)	(England) (England)	1984	1984
Jimmy Goodfellow	(England)	1984	1984
Alan Durban	(Wales)	1984	1986
Jimmy Mullen (caretaker)	(England)	1986	1986
Frank Burrows	(Scotland)	1986	1989
Len Ashurst	(England)	1989	1991
Eddie May	(England)	1991	1994
Terry Yorath	(Wales)	1994	1995
Eddie May	(England)	1995	1995
Kenny Hibbitt	(England)	1995	1996
Phil Neal	(England)	1996	1996

Name	Nat	From	To
Kenny Hibbitt (caretaker)	(England)	1996	1996
Russell Osman	(England)	1996	1998
Kenny Hibbitt (caretaker)	(England)	1998	1998
Frank Burrows	(Scotland)	1998	2000
Billy Ayre	(England)	2000	2000
Bobby Gould	(England)	2000	2000
Alan Cork	(England)	2000	2002
Lennie Lawrence	(England)	2002	2005
Dave Jones	(England)	2005	2011
Malky Mackay	(Scotland)	2011	2013
David Kerslake (caretaker)	(England)	2013	2014
Ole Gunnar Solskjær	(Norway)	2014	2014
Scott Young & Daniel Gabbidon (caretakers)	(Wales) (Wales)	2014	2014
Russell Slade	(England)	2014	2016
Paul Trollope	(Wales)	2016	2016
Neil Warnock	(England)	2016	2019
Neil Harris	(England)	2019	2021
Mick McCarthy	(Republic of Ireland)	2021	2021
Steve Morison	(Wales)	2021	2022
Mark Hudson	(England)	2022	2023
Dean Whitehead (caretaker)	(England)	2023	2023
Sabri Lamouchi	(France)	2023	2023
Erol Bulut	(Turkey)	2023	2024
Omer Riza	(Turkey)	2024	2025
Aaron Ramsey (caretaker)	(Wales)	2025	2025
Brian Barry-Murphy	(Republic of Ireland)	2025	Present

== Records ==
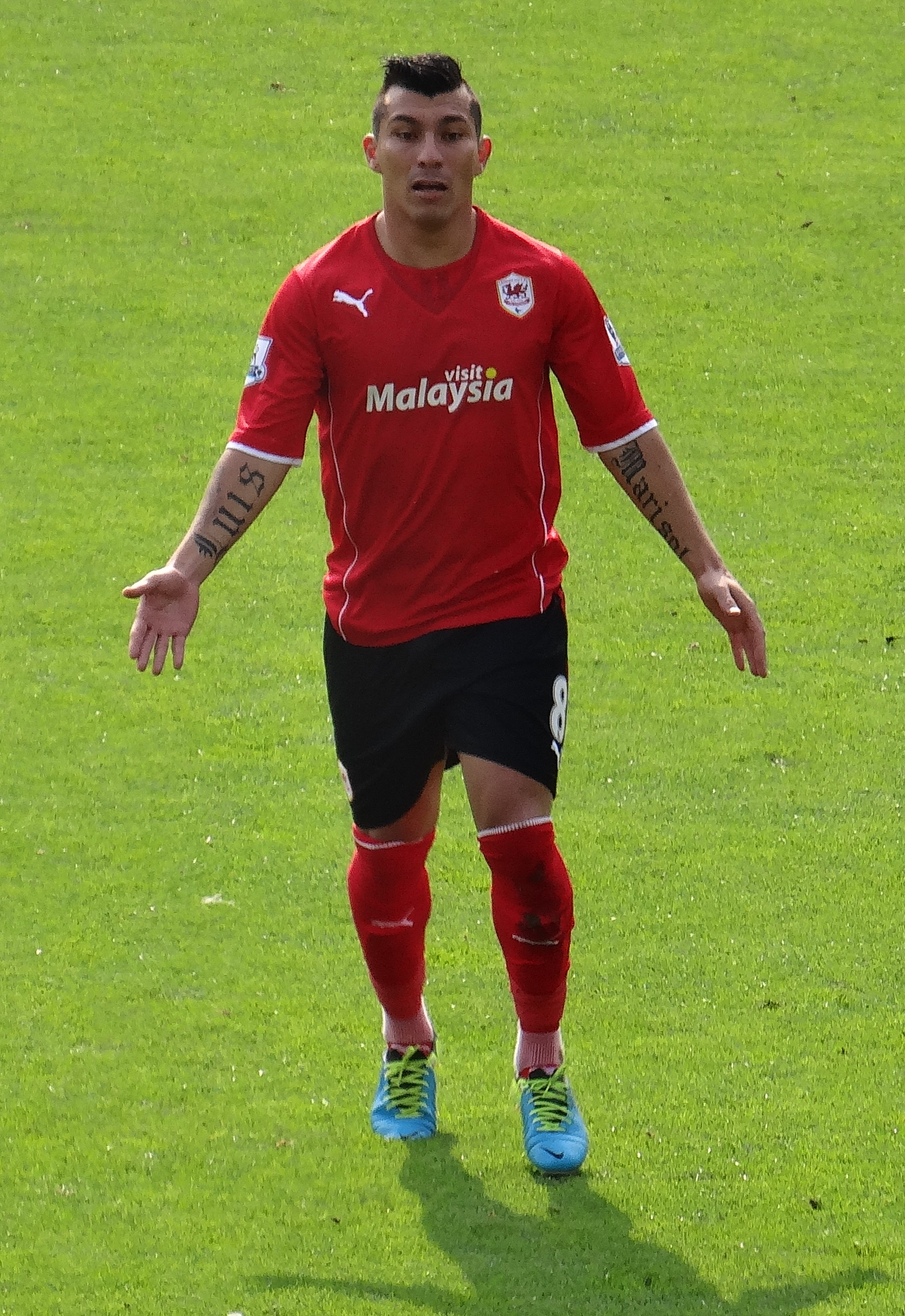
Cardiff set club records when buying Gary Medel in 2013 and selling him a year later.

The record for the most appearances in all competitions is currently held by Billy Hardy who appeared in 590 matches for the club between 1911 and 1932, including in the Southern Football League. Phil Dwyer has made the most appearances in the Football League era, having played in 575 matches. Len Davies is the club's top goalscorer with 179 goals in all competitions. Seven other players, Peter King, Robert Earnshaw, Brian Clark, Carl Dale, Derek Tapscott, Jimmy Gill and John Toshack have also scored 100 or more goals for the club.

Jack Evans became the first Cardiff City player to win an international cap on 13 April 1912 when he represented Wales in a 3–2 defeat of Ireland. The player who has won the most caps as a Cardiff player is Aron Gunnarsson, who won 62 caps for Iceland during his spell with the club. The highest transfer fee the club has paid for a player is £15 million for Emiliano Sala from Nantes in January 2019. Two days after signing, Sala died in a a plane crash in the English Channel. Gary Medel became the most expensive player sold by the club when he joined Inter Milan for £10 million in August 2014.

Cardiff's largest victory was a 16–0 victory over Knighton Town in the fifth round of the Welsh Cup in 1962. Their biggest league victory was a 9–2 victory over Thames on 6 February 1932; their biggest FA Cup victory was an 8–0 victory over Enfield on 28 November 1931.

Defender Noah Anyadike, at 15 years and 98 days old, became the youngest player ever to play in the EFL Cup (and the youngest player in Cardiff's history) when he played for Cardiff against Norwich City at the Cardiff City Stadium on 25 August 2026.

== Honours ==
Cardiff City's honours include the following:

League

- First Division (level 1)
  - Runners-up: 1923–24
- Second Division / Championship (level 2)
  - Champions: 2012–13
  - Runners-up: 1920–21, 1951–52, 1959–60, 2017–18
- Third Division South / Third Division / Second Division (level 3)
  - Champions: 1946–47
  - Runners-up: 1975–76, 1982–83, 2025–26
  - Play-off winners: 2003
- Fourth Division / Third Division (level 4)
  - Champions: 1992–93
  - Runners-up: 1987–88, 2000–01
  - Promoted: 1998–99
- Southern League Second Division
  - Champions: 1912–13

Cup

- FA Cup
  - Winners: 1926–27
  - Runners-up: 1924–25, 2007–08
- Football League Cup
  - Runners-up: 2011–12
- FA Charity Shield
  - Winners: 1927
- Welsh Cup
  - Winners (22): 1911–12, 1919–20, 1921–22, 1922–23, 1926–27, 1927–28, 1929–30, 1955–56, 1958–59, 1963–64, 1964–65, 1966–67, 1967–68, 1968–69, 1969–70, 1970–71, 1972–73, 1973–74, 1975–76, 1987–88, 1991–92, 1992–93
- FAW Premier Cup
  - Winners: 2001–02

== Sources ==
=== Bibliography ===
- Grandin, Terry (2010). Cardiff City 100 Years of Professional Football. Vertical Editions. ISBN 978-1-904091-45-5.
- Hayes, Dean P. (2003). The South Wales Derbies. Manchester, UK: The Parrs Wood Press. ISBN 1-903158-43-5.
- Hayes, Dean (2006). The Who's Who of Cardiff City. Nottingham, UK: Breedon Books. ISBN 1-85983-462-0.
- Shepherd, Richard (2007). The Cardiff City Miscellany. Sussex, UK: Pitch Publishing. ISBN 978-1-905411-04-7.
- Shepherd, Richard (2002). The Definitive: Cardiff City F.C. Nottingham, UK: SoccerData Publications. ISBN 1-899468-17-X.
