= 1966–67 Chester F.C. season =

Chester
1966–67 season
- Manager: Peter Hauser
- Stadium: Sealand Road
- Football League Fourth Division: 19th
- FA Cup: First round
- Football League Cup: First round
- Welsh Cup: Semifinal
- Top goalscorer: League: Les Jones (13); All: Les Jones (15)
- Highest home attendance: 12,205 vs Wrexham (8 October)
- Lowest home attendance: 2,559 vs Chesterfield (12 April)
- Average home league attendance: 5,156; 12th in division

The 1966–67 season was the 29th season of competitive association football in the Football League played by Chester, an English club based in Chester, Cheshire.

Also, it was the ninth season spent in the Fourth Division after its creation. Alongside competing in the Football League the club also participated in the FA Cup, Football League Cup and the Welsh Cup.

== Football League ==
Pos	Team	Pld	W	D	L	GF	GA	GAv	Pts	Promotion or relegation
17	Luton Town	46	16	9	21	59	73	0.808	41	
18	Newport County	46	12	16	18	56	63	0.889	40	
19	Chester	46	15	10	21	54	78	0.692	40	
20	Notts County	46	13	11	22	53	72	0.736	37	
21	Rochdale	46	13	11	22	53	75	0.707	37	Re-elected

Source: rsssf.com

=== Results summary ===
Overall								Home						Away					
Pld	W	D	L	GF	GA	GAv	Pts	W	D	L	GF	GA	Pts	W	D	L	GF	GA	Pts
46	15	10	21	54	78	0.692	40	8	5	10	24	32	21	7	5	11	30	46	19

Source: rsssf.com

=== Results by matchday ===
Round	1	2	3	4	5	6	7	8	9	10	11	12	13	14	15	16	17	18	19	20	21	22	23	24	25	26	27	28	29	30	31	32	33	34	35	36	37	38	39	40	41	42	43	44	45	46
Result	D	L	D	D	L	D	W	L	W	L	L	W	D	W	W	L	L	L	W	L	D	D	W	L	D	L	L	D	L	W	L	W	D	L	L	L	W	L	W	L	W	L	W	W	L	W
Position	7	20	19	20	22	19	18	19	19	20	22	20	18	15	15	17	18	20	18	18	18	18	18	20	19	19	19	19	20	18	18	18	17	20	20	21	19	20	18	19	17	18	18	16	18	17

Source: statto.com
W = Win; D = Draw; L = Loss

=== Matches ===
Date	Opponents	Venue	Result	Score	Scorers	Attendance
20 August	Tranmere Rovers	A	D	0–0		6,756
27 August	Bradford Park Avenue	H	L	0–3		6,392
3 September	Port Vale	A	D	1–1	Miles (o.g.)	6,853
7 September	Southend United	H	D	1–1	L. Jones	6,132
10 September	Crewe Alexandra	H	L	0–3		7,143
16 September	Barrow	A	D	1–1	Metcalf	5,199
24 September	York City	H	W	3–1	Harley, Singleton, Durie	5,315
26 September	Southend United	A	L	1–5	L. Jones	8,945
1 October	Lincoln City	A	W	3–2	L. Jones, Harley, Metcalf	2,818
8 October	Wrexham	H	L	1–3	Stacey (o.g.)	12,205
15 October	Aldershot	A	L	0–3		4,510
19 October	Rochdale	H	W	3–2	Metcalf, Talbot (2)	4,316
22 October	Luton Town	H	D	0–0		5,751
29 October	Barnsley	A	W	2–1	Talbot, Humes	4,474
5 November	Newport County	H	W	4–2	Ryden, Morris, Metcalf (2)	5,257
12 November	Brentford	A	L	0–4		6,606
19 November	Halifax Town	H	L	0–2		5,265
3 December	Exeter City	H	L	0–2		3,086
10 December	Bradford City	A	W	3–2	Ryden, L. Jones (2)	4,293
17 December	Tranmere Rovers	H	L	0–1		6,041
23 December	Stockport County	A	D	1–1	Metcalf	8,855
26 December	Stockport County	H	D	1–1	Talbot	8,825
31 December	Bradford Park Avenue	A	W	3–2	Durie, Ryden, Talbot	3,966
14 January	Crewe Alexandra	A	L	1–3	L. Jones	7,200
21 January	Barrow	H	D	1–1	Ryden	5,143
28 January	Port Vale	H	L	1–3	Talbot	5,586
30 January	Hartlepools United	A	L	2–3	L. Jones, Ryden	7,988
4 February	York City	A	D	1–1	Ryden	3,094
11 February	Lincoln City	H	L	0–1		4,251
18 February	Southport	H	W	2–1	Humes, L. Jones	5,240
25 February	Wrexham	A	L	1–3	L. Jones	11,751
1 March	Rochdale	A	W	1–0	Ryden	2,140
4 March	Aldershot	H	D	0–0		3,893
11 March	Southport	A	L	3–4	Humes (2), L. Jones	4,736
18 March	Luton Town	A	L	0–1		6,982
24 March	Notts County	H	L	1–2	L. Jones	4,292
25 March	Hartlepools United	H	W	1–0	Metcalf	3,126
28 March	Notts County	A	L	0–3		3,398
3 April	Newport County	A	W	3–2	Seaton, Ryden (2)	2,592
8 April	Brentford	H	L	1–2	Metcalf (pen.)	2,683
12 April	Chesterfield	H	W	2–1	Ryden, L. Jones	2,559
15 April	Halifax Town	A	L	1–2	Ryden	3,506
22 April	Barnsley	H	W	1–0	Morris	2,969
24 April	Chesterfield	A	W	2–0	Morris, L. Jones	2,547
29 April	Exeter City	A	L	0–2		3,077
6 May	Bradford City	H	W	1–0	Seaton	3,109

== FA Cup ==
Round	Date	Opponents	Venue	Result	Score	Scorers	Attendance
First round	26 November	Middlesbrough (2)	H	L	2–5	Metcalf, Morris	7,607

== League Cup ==
Round	Date	Opponents	Venue	Result	Score	Scorers	Attendance
First round	24 August	Tranmere Rovers (4)	H	L	2–5	Ryden, Talbot	6,660

== Welsh Cup ==
Round	Date	Opponents	Venue	Result	Score	Scorers	Attendance
Fifth round	20 January	Borough United (Welsh League (North))	A	W	5–2	Morris (2), L. Jones (2), Talbot	
Quarterfinal	16 February	Pwllheli (Welsh League (North))	A	W	3–2	Humes (pen.), Talbot (2)	
Semifinal	15 March	Wrexham (4)	A	D	0–0		9,496
Semifinal replay	20 March	Wrexham (4)	A	L	2–4	Humes, Ryden	11,329

== Season statistics ==
Nat	Player	Total		League		FA Cup		League Cup		Welsh Cup	
Nat	Player	A	G	A	G	A	G	A	G	A	G
Goalkeepers
(England)	Terry Carling	28	–	24	–	–	–	–	–	4	–
(England)	John Coates	1	–	1	–	–	–	–	–	–	–
(Scotland)	Dennis Reeves	23	–	21	–	1	–	1	–	–	–
Field players
(England)	John Bennett	41+1	–	35+1	–	1	–	1	–	4	–
(England)	Dave Berry	0+1	–	0+1	–	–	–	–	–	–	–
(England)	John Butler	33+2	–	27+2	–	1	–	1	–	4	–
(England)	Graham Chadwick	5	–	5	–	–	–	–	–	–	–
(England)	Dave Durie	20+1	2	19+1	2	–	–	–	–	1	–
(England)	Keith Edwards	3	–	2	–	1	–	–	–	–	–
(Wales)	George Evans	30	–	25	–	1	–	1	–	3	–
(England)	Les Harley	11+3	2	10+3	2	–	–	–	–	1	–
(South Africa)	Peter Hauser	21+2	–	19+2	–	1	–	1	–	–	–
(England)	Alan Hignett	6	–	6	–	–	–	–	–	–	–
(England)	Reg Holland	5	–	4	–	–	–	–	–	1	–
(England)	Jimmy Humes	25+1	6	21	4	1	–	–	–	3+1	2
(Wales)	Bryn Jones	12	–	11	–	–	–	–	–	1	–
(Wales)	Les Jones	41+1	15	36	13	0+1	–	1	–	4	2
(England)	Ray Jones	25	–	24	–	–	–	–	–	1	–
(England)	Mike Metcalf	52	9	46	8	1	1	1	–	4	–
(Wales)	Elfed Morris	29	6	25	3	1	1	1	–	2	2
(England)	David Read	8+1	–	6+1	–	–	–	–	–	2	–
(Scotland)	Hugh Ryden	46	13	40	11	1	–	1	1	4	1
(England)	John Sealey	3	–	3	–	–	–	–	–	–	–
	Gordon Seaton	26	2	26	2	–	–	–	–	–	–
(England)	Tommy Singleton	45	1	40	1	1	–	1	–	3	–
(England)	Malcolm Starkey	6	–	6	–	–	–	–	–	–	–
(England)	Gary Talbot	27	10	24	6	–	–	1	1	2	3
	Own goals	–	2	–	2	–	–	–	–	–	–
	Total	52	68	46	54	1	2	1	2	4	10
