= 1964–65 Chester F.C. season =

Chester
1964–65 season
- Manager: Peter Hauser
- Stadium: Sealand Road
- Football League Fourth Division: 8th
- FA Cup: Third round
- Football League Cup: Third round
- Welsh Cup: Semifinal
- Top goalscorer: League: Gary Talbot (28); All: Mike Metcalf (38)
- Highest home attendance: 14,782 vs Wrexham (27 February)
- Lowest home attendance: 5,152 vs Aldershot (12 December)
- Average home league attendance: 7,659; 7th in division

The 1964–65 season was the 27th season of competitive association football in the Football League played by Chester, an English club based in Chester, Cheshire.

Also, it was the seventh season spent in the Fourth Division after its creation. Alongside competing in the Football League the club also participated in the FA Cup, Football League Cup and the Welsh Cup.

== Football League ==
Pos	Team	Pld	W	D	L	GF	GA	GAv	Pts
6	Rochdale	46	22	14	10	74	53	1.396	58
7	Bradford (Park Avenue)	46	20	17	9	86	62	1.387	57
8	Chester	46	25	6	15	119	81	1.469	56
9	Doncaster Rovers	46	20	11	15	84	72	1.167	51
10	Crewe Alexandra	46	18	13	15	90	81	1.111	49

Source: rsssf.com

=== Results summary ===
Overall								Home						Away					
Pld	W	D	L	GF	GA	GAv	Pts	W	D	L	GF	GA	Pts	W	D	L	GF	GA	Pts
46	25	6	15	119	81	1.469	56	19	1	3	75	26	39	6	5	12	44	55	17

Source: rsssf.com

=== Results by matchday ===
Round	1	2	3	4	5	6	7	8	9	10	11	12	13	14	15	16	17	18	19	20	21	22	23	24	25	26	27	28	29	30	31	32	33	34	35	36	37	38	39	40	41	42	43	44	45	46
Result	L	W	L	W	L	W	W	D	W	D	L	W	W	L	L	W	L	D	W	D	W	L	W	L	W	L	W	W	D	W	W	D	W	W	L	L	L	W	L	W	W	W	L	W	W	W
Position	19	13	15	11	15	13	10	9	7	7	12	8	9	9	10	8	15	13	10	11	9	11	9	9	8	12	9	8	9	8	8	7	7	7	7	7	8	8	8	8	8	8	8	8	8	8

Source: statto.com
W = Win; D = Draw; L = Loss

=== Matches ===
Date	Opponents	Venue	Result	Score	Scorers	Attendance
22 August	Aldershot	A	L	1–3	Metcalf	6,151
25 August	Bradford City	A	W	3–1	Talbot (2), Morris	6,202
29 August	Torquay United	H	L	0–1		6,830
4 September	Stockport County	A	W	5–4	Talbot (3), Morris, Metcalf (pen.)	4,367
7 September	Millwall	A	L	0–1		9,198
12 September	York City	H	W	4–1	Talbot (2), Ryden, Morris	6,095
16 September	Millwall	H	W	3–1	Metcalf (2), Morris	7,005
19 September	Lincoln City	A	D	2–2	Humes (2)	3,897
26 September	Brighton & Hove Albion	H	W	3–1	Ryden (2), Metcalf	9,068
28 September	Hartlepools United	A	D	1–1	Metcalf	8,822
3 October	Oxford United	A	L	2–3	Morris (2)	8,758
7 October	Hartlepools United	H	W	4–0	Humes, Ryden (2), Talbot,	7,796
10 October	Southport	H	W	3–1	Talbot (2)	7,228
14 October	Rochdale	A	L	1–2	Hauser, Humes	4,845
17 October	Wrexham	A	L	2–4	Metcalf (pen.), Talbot	14,690
24 October	Tranmere Rovers	H	W	3–2	Talbot, Metcalf, Humes	12,076
31 October	Darlington	A	L	0–2		4,229
7 November	Crewe Alexandra	H	D	2–2	Durie, Metcalf	6,922
21 November	Halifax Town	H	W	1–0	Talbot	6,028
28 November	Notts County	A	D	1–1	Ryden	5,878
12 December	Aldershot	H	W	6–2	Metcalf (2), Morris (3)	5,152
19 December	Torquay United	A	L	2–3	Ryden (2)	3,627
26 December	Bradford Park Avenue	H	W	3–0	Humes, Ryden, Metcalf (pen.)	10,057
28 December	Bradford Park Avenue	A	L	1–3	Morris	9,968
2 January	Stockport County	H	W	4–0	Metcalf (2), Ryden (2)	7,606
16 January	York City	A	L	2–3	Humes (2)	5,118
23 January	Lincoln City	H	W	5–1	Ryden, Talbot (2), Metcalf (2)	7,432
30 January	Newport County	A	W	1–0	Metcalf	3,219
6 February	Brighton & Hove Albion	A	D	4–4	Morris, Talbot (2), Metcalf	16,434
10 February	Bradford City	H	W	3–1	Morris (2), Talbot	7,759
13 February	Oxford United	H	W	2–1	Humes, Metcalf	7,988
20 February	Southport	A	D	2–2	Humes, Metcalf	3,439
24 February	Chesterfield	H	W	4–0	Talbot, Metcalf, Morris, Humes	7,401
27 February	Wrexham	H	W	6–1	Metcalf, Morris, Humes (3), Talbot	14,782
10 March	Rochdale	H	L	0–1		8,550
13 March	Darlington	H	L	4–5	Morris (2), Corbishley, Metcalf (pen.)	6,455
20 March	Crewe Alexandra	A	L	1–5	Morris	5,641
26 March	Newport County	H	W	4–3	Metcalf (3, 1pen.), Morris	5,843
29 March	Tranmere Rovers	A	L	1–4	Ryden	15,484
3 April	Halifax Town	A	W	4–3	Ryden (2), Morris, Humes	1,945
6 April	Doncaster Rovers	A	W	4–1	Talbot, Morris (2), Ryden	8,007
10 April	Notts County	H	W	4–1	Talbot (2), Metcalf (pen.), Ryden	5,684
16 April	Barrow	A	L	1–2	Morris	3,816
17 April	Chesterfield	A	W	3–1	Humes, Morris, Talbot	5,971
19 April	Barrow	H	W	4–1	Humes, Ryden, Talbot (2)	6,006
24 April	Doncaster Rovers	H	W	3–0	Ryden (2), Talbot	6,405

== FA Cup ==
Round	Date	Opponents	Venue	Result	Score	Scorers	Attendance
First round	14 November	Crewe Alexandra (4)	H	W	5–0	Metcalf (2, 1pen.), Talbot (3)	9,436
Second round	5 December	Barnsley (3)	A	W	5–2	Metcalf (3), Humes, Morris	6,674
Third round	9 January	Manchester United (1)	A	L	1–2	Humes 9'	45,660

== League Cup ==
Round	Date	Opponents	Venue	Result	Score	Scorers	Attendance
First round	2 September	Wrexham (4)	H	W	3–0	Metcalf (2), Talbot	10,331
Second round	23 September	Derby County (2)	H	W	5–4	Metcalf (2, 1pen.), Morris, Talbot (2)	9,874
Third round	21 October	Norwich City (2)	A	L	3–5	Metcalf, Talbot, Humes	9,345

== Welsh Cup ==
Round	Date	Opponents	Venue	Result	Score	Scorers	Attendance
Fifth round	20 January	Bangor City (CCL)	H	D	1–1	Metcalf	4,321
Fifth round replay	27 January	Bangor City (CCL)	A	W	4–0	Ryden (2), Talbot, Humes	3,542
Quarterfinal	17 February	Borough United (Welsh League (North))	H	D	0–0		6,934
Quarterfinal replay	9 March	Borough United (Welsh League (North))	A	D	2–2	Humes, Owen (o.g.)	
Quarterfinal second replay	16 March	Borough United (Welsh League (North))	H	W	3–0	Talbot, Morris (2)	7,175
Semifinal	30 March	Wrexham (3)	A	L	0–3		12,341

== Season statistics ==
Nat	Player	Total		League		FA Cup		League Cup		Welsh Cup	
Nat	Player	A	G	A	G	A	G	A	G	A	G
Goalkeepers
(England)	Reg Barton	7	–	5	–	–	–	–	–	2	–
(Scotland)	Dennis Reeves	51	–	41	–	3	–	3	–	4	–
Field players
(England)	Stan Bennion	1	–	–	–	–	–	–	–	1	–
(England)	Dave Berry	1	–	–	–	–	–	–	–	1	–
(England)	John Butler	58	–	46	–	3	–	3	–	6	–
(England)	Colin Corbishley	9	1	8	1	–	–	1	–	–	–
(England)	Dave Durie	45	1	36	1	3	–	1	–	5	–
(Wales)	George Evans	12	–	10	–	–	–	1	–	1	–
(England)	John Evans	1	–	1	–	–	–	–	–	–	–
(England)	Les Harley	3	–	2	–	–	–	–	–	1	–
(England)	Brian Harvey	1	–	1	–	–	–	–	–	–	–
(South Africa)	Peter Hauser	51	1	39	1	3	–	3	–	6	–
(England)	Jimmy Humes	56	22	44	17	3	2	3	1	6	2
(Wales)	Bryn Jones	2	–	2	–	–	–	–	–	–	–
(England)	Ray Jones	55	–	43	–	3	–	3	–	6	–
(England)	Garth Lee	1	–	1	–	–	–	–	–	–	–
(England)	Mike Metcalf	55	38	43	27	3	5	3	5	6	1
(England)	John Molyneux	1	–	1	–	–	–	–	–	–	–
(Wales)	Elfed Morris	55	28	44	24	3	1	2	1	6	2
(England)	David Read	5	–	4	–	–	–	1	–	–	–
(Scotland)	Hugh Ryden	55	22	44	20	3	–	3	–	5	2
(England)	Malcolm Starkey	58	–	46	–	3	–	3	–	6	–
(England)	Gary Talbot	54	37	44	28	3	3	3	4	4	2
(England)	Fred Willder	1	–	1	–	–	–	–	–	–	–
	Own goals	–	1	–	–	–	–	–	–	–	1
	Total	58	151	46	119	3	11	3	11	6	10
