= 1965–66 Chester F.C. season =

Chester 1965–66 football season

Chester
1965–66 season
- Manager: Peter Hauser
- Stadium: Sealand Road
- Football League Fourth Division: 7th
- FA Cup: Third round
- Football League Cup: First round
- Welsh Cup: Final
- Top goalscorer: League: Elfed Morris (24); All: Elfed Morris (28)
- Highest home attendance: 13,004 vs Wrexham (18 September)
- Lowest home attendance: 4,740 vs Luton Town (28 May)
- Average home league attendance: 8,504; 2nd in division

The 1965–66 season was the 28th season of competitive association football in the Football League played by Chester, an English club based in Chester, Cheshire.

Also, it was the eighth season spent in the Fourth Division after its creation. Alongside competing in the Football League the club also participated in the FA Cup, Football League Cup and the Welsh Cup.

== Football League ==
Pos	Team	Pld	W	D	L	GF	GA	GAv	Pts
5	Tranmere Rovers	46	24	8	14	93	66	1.409	56
6	Luton Town	46	24	8	14	90	70	1.286	56
7	Chester	46	20	12	14	79	70	1.129	52
8	Notts County	46	19	12	15	61	53	1.151	50
9	Newport County	46	18	12	16	75	75	1.000	48

Source: rsssf.com

=== Results summary ===
Overall								Home						Away					
Pld	W	D	L	GF	GA	GAv	Pts	W	D	L	GF	GA	Pts	W	D	L	GF	GA	Pts
46	20	12	14	79	70	1.129	52	15	5	3	52	27	35	5	7	11	27	43	17

Source: rsssf.com

=== Results by matchday ===
Round	1	2	3	4	5	6	7	8	9	10	11	12	13	14	15	16	17	18	19	20	21	22	23	24	25	26	27	28	29	30	31	32	33	34	35	36	37	38	39	40	41	42	43	44	45	46
Result	W	L	W	W	D	W	W	W	L	D	D	W	L	W	W	L	L	W	W	W	D	W	W	L	D	W	W	W	D	D	W	L	L	W	D	L	L	D	W	D	L	L	L	D	L	D
Position	1	11	7	4	5	2	1	1	2	1	2	2	4	3	3	3	4	3	3	3	4	2	2	3	3	2	2	1	3	2	1	3	3	5	3	4	4	3	2	3	5	6	7	7	7	7

Source: statto.com
W = Win; D = Draw; L = Loss

=== Matches ===
Date	Opponents	Venue	Result	Score	Scorers	Attendance
21 August	Stockport County	H	W	1–0	Humes	9,973
23 August	Tranmere Rovers	A	L	0–1		13,206
28 August	Darlington	A	W	1–0	Humes	4,144
4 September	Lincoln City	H	W	4–2	Ryden, Metcalf, Talbot, Hauser	6,742
11 September	Notts County	A	D	3–3	Humes, Talbot, Metcalf	4,916
15 September	Tranmere Rovers	H	W	3–1	Ryden, Morris, Metcalf (pen.)	12,859
18 September	Wrexham	H	W	4–2	Morris (2), Ryden, L. Jones	13,004
25 September	Halifax Town	H	W	1–0	Humes	6,907
2 October	Port Vale	A	L	2–5	Morris (2)	8,108
6 October	Barnsley	H	D	3–3	Talbot, Morris, Metcalf	8,412
9 October	Aldershot	A	D	2–2	L. Jones, Durie	4,817
16 October	Newport County	H	W	6–1	Metcalf, Morris (2), L. Jones (2), Ryden	8,027
23 October	Torquay United	A	L	0–1		6,470
27 October	Crewe Alexandra	H	W	3–0	Ryden (2), L. Jones	10,176
30 October	Chesterfield	H	W	3–0	L. Jones, Morris, Metcalf (pen.)	8,863
5 November	Rochdale	A	L	0–3		3,122
20 November	Barrow	A	L	1–4	Ryden	4,295
23 November	Barnsley	A	W	2–0	Morris, Ryden	2,959
27 November	Hartlepools United	H	W	2–0	L. Jones, Morris	6,547
11 December	Southport	H	W	1–0	Morris	7,501
27 December	Colchester United	A	D	1–1	Morris	7,849
28 December	Colchester United	H	W	2–1	Morris, L. Jones	8,361
1 January	Aldershot	H	W	3–2	Ryden (2), Metcalf	8,535
8 January	Luton Town	A	L	2–5	Morris, Metcalf	6,670
15 January	Torquay United	H	D	1–1	Morris	9,302
28 January	Stockport County	A	W	1–0	Morris	8,138
5 February	Darlington	H	W	3–2	Talbot, Hauser, Morris	9,494
12 February	Bradford City	H	W	4–0	Metcalf, Morris, L. Jones (2)	8,038
19 February	Lincoln City	A	D	2–2	Humes, Metcalf	3,111
26 February	Notts County	H	D	1–1	Ryden	8,704
5 March	Bradford City	A	W	2–1	Morris (2)	5,596
12 March	Wrexham	A	L	1–2	L. Jones	17,178
18 March	Halifax Town	A	L	0–2		5,117
26 March	Port Vale	H	W	2–0	Metcalf, L. Jones	6,520
28 March	Chesterfield	A	D	2–2	Morris, Humes	2,844
2 April	Rochdale	H	L	1–2	Metcalf	6,261
8 April	Bradford Park Avenue	H	L	2–4	Ryden, Morris	9,526
9 April	Doncaster Rovers	A	D	1–1	Morris	11,443
12 April	Bradford Park Avenue	A	W	1–0	Harley	7,030
16 April	Barrow	H	D	0–0		7,165
23 April	Hartlepools United	A	L	0–2		4,138
30 April	Doncaster Rovers	H	L	1–4	Metcalf	9,831
7 May	Southport	A	L	0–2		4,694
18 May	Crewe Alexandra	A	D	1–1	Ryden	3,947
23 May	Newport County	A	L	2–3	Metcalf, L. Jones	1,636
28 May	Luton Town	H	D	1–1	Humes	4,740

== FA Cup ==
Round	Date	Opponents	Venue	Result	Score	Scorers	Attendance
First round	13 November	Chesterfield (4)	A	W	2–0	Metcalf, Humes	11,690
Second round	4 December	Wigan Athletic (CCL)	H	W	2–1	Humes, Morris	16,283
Third round	22 January	Newcastle United (1)	H	L	1–3	Morris 9'	18,251

== League Cup ==
Round	Date	Opponents	Venue	Result	Score	Scorers	Attendance
First round	1 September	Wrexham (4)	A	L	2–5	Metcalf (2)	9,996

== Welsh Cup ==
Round	Date	Opponents	Venue	Result	Score	Scorers	Attendance
Fifth round	5 January	Wrexham (4)	H	W	4–1	G. Evans, Humes, Ryden, Talbot	7,213
Quarterfinal	7 February	Newport County (4)	A	D	2–2	Willder, Morris	1,776
Quarterfinal replay	16 February	Newport County (4)	H	W	2–0	Ryden, Humes	5,296
Semifinal	23 March	Bangor City (CCL)	A	W	3–0	Metcalf, L. Jones (2)	2,538
Final first leg	18 April	Swansea Town (3)	A	L	0–3		9,614
Final second leg	25 April	Swansea Town (3)	H	W	1–0	Morris	6,346
Final replay	2 May	Swansea Town (3)	H	L	1–2	L. Jones	6,276

== Season statistics ==
Nat	Player	Total		League		FA Cup		League Cup		Welsh Cup	
Nat	Player	A	G	A	G	A	G	A	G	A	G
Goalkeepers
(England)	Dick Howard	2	–	1	–	–	–	–	–	1	–
(Scotland)	Dennis Reeves	55	–	45	–	3	–	1	–	6	–
Field players
(England)	John Butler	56	–	46	–	3	–	1	–	6	–
(England)	Graham Chadwick	8+1	–	6+1	–	–	–	–	–	2	–
(England)	Dave Durie	38+1	1	32+1	1	3	–	1	–	2	–
(England)	Keith Edwards	1	–	1	–	–	–	–	–	–	–
(Wales)	George Evans	29	1	22	–	1	–	–	–	6	1
(England)	Les Harley	13	1	10	1	–	–	–	–	3	–
(South Africa)	Peter Hauser	46+2	2	37+2	2	3	–	1	–	5	–
(England)	Reg Holland	2+1	–	1+1	–	–	–	–	–	1	–
(England)	Jimmy Humes	45	11	37	7	3	2	1	–	4	2
(Wales)	Bryn Jones	19	–	17	–	2	–	–	–	–	–
(Wales)	Les Jones	46	16	37	13	3	–	1	–	5	3
(England)	Ray Jones	26	–	23	–	2	–	1	–	–	–
(England)	Mike Metcalf	57	18	46	14	3	1	1	2	7	1
(Wales)	Elfed Morris	53	28	43	24	3	2	–	–	7	2
(England)	David Read	0+3	–	0+3	–	–	–	–	–	–	–
(Scotland)	Hugh Ryden	53+1	15	42+1	13	3	–	1	–	7	2
(England)	Tommy Singleton	36+1	–	27+1	–	1	–	1	–	7	–
(England)	Malcolm Starkey	29	–	23	–	–	–	–	–	6	–
(England)	Gary Talbot	12+1	5	10+1	4	–	–	1	–	1	1
(England)	Fred Willder	1+1	1	0+1	–	–	–	–	–	1	1
	Total	57	99	46	79	3	5	1	2	7	13
