= 1963–64 Chester F.C. season =

Chester
1963–64 season
- Manager: Peter Hauser
- Stadium: Sealand Road
- Football League Fourth Division: 12th
- FA Cup: Second round
- Football League Cup: First round
- Welsh Cup: Quarterfinal
- Top goalscorer: League: Gary Talbot (23); All: Gary Talbot (25)
- Highest home attendance: 8,398 vs Brighton & Hove Albion (23 October)
- Lowest home attendance: 4,105 vs Aldershot (25 April)
- Average home league attendance: 6,182; 7th in division

The 1963–64 season was the 26th season of competitive association football in the Football League played by Chester, an English club based in Chester, Cheshire.

Also, it was the sixth season spent in the Fourth Division after its creation. Alongside competing in the Football League the club also participated in the FA Cup, Football League Cup and the Welsh Cup.

== Football League ==
Pos	Team	Pld	W	D	L	GF	GA	GAv	Pts
10	Halifax Town	46	17	14	15	77	77	1.000	48
11	Lincoln City	46	19	9	18	67	75	0.893	47
12	Chester	46	19	8	19	65	60	1.083	46
13	Bradford Park Avenue	46	18	9	19	75	81	0.926	45
14	Doncaster Rovers	46	15	12	19	70	75	0.933	42

Source: rsssf.com

=== Results summary ===
Overall								Home						Away					
Pld	W	D	L	GF	GA	GAv	Pts	W	D	L	GF	GA	Pts	W	D	L	GF	GA	Pts
46	19	8	19	65	60	1.083	46	17	3	3	47	18	37	2	5	16	18	42	9

Source: rsssf.com

=== Results by matchday ===
Round	1	2	3	4	5	6	7	8	9	10	11	12	13	14	15	16	17	18	19	20	21	22	23	24	25	26	27	28	29	30	31	32	33	34	35	36	37	38	39	40	41	42	43	44	45	46
Result	L	W	D	W	D	L	W	L	W	D	L	W	L	W	D	W	D	L	W	W	L	L	W	L	W	D	W	W	W	L	W	L	L	W	L	L	L	W	D	L	L	D	L	W	L	W
Position	21	12	12	5	5	13	11	15	11	11	14	11	15	12	11	6	6	9	7	6	8	8	8	10	10	7	6	6	5	6	6	7	9	9	9	9	9	8	9	8	9	10	12	10	11	11

Source: statto.com
W = Win; D = Draw; L = Loss

=== Matches ===
Date	Opponents	Venue	Result	Score	Scorers	Attendance
24 August	Oxford United	H	L	0–2		6,008
28 August	Barrow	H	W	2–0	Arrowsmith (o.g.), Corbishley	5,454
31 August	Workington	A	D	1–1	Read	2,902
7 September	Newport County	H	W	3–0	Corbishley, Bades, Talbot	5,362
9 September	Barrow	A	D	2–2	Talbot (2)	3,441
14 September	Stockport County	A	L	0–1		6,134
21 September	Bradford Park Avenue	H	W	1–0	Corbishley	5,569
28 September	Chesterfield	A	L	0–1		6,134
2 October	Rochdale	H	W	2–0	Lee, Humes	5,220
5 October	Doncaster Rovers	H	D	1–1	Lee	6,214
7 October	Darlington	A	L	0–1		3,062
12 October	Exeter City	H	W	2–0	Talbot, Lee	6,966
16 October	Darlington	H	L	0–1		8,103
19 October	Southport	A	W	2–0	Morris, Corbishley	3,690
23 October	Brighton & Hove Albion	H	D	0–0		8,398
26 October	Gillingham	H	W	1–0	Humes	8,395
29 October	Brighton & Hove Albion	A	D	0–0		11,999
2 November	Lincoln City	A	L	2–3	Morris (2)	5,523
9 November	Bradford City	H	W	3–0	Morris, Corbishley (pen.), Lee	7,835
23 November	Carlisle United	H	W	4–2	Talbot (4)	8,223
30 November	Torquay United	A	L	0–5		4,075
14 December	Oxford United	A	L	1–2	Lee	5,283
21 December	Workington	H	W	2–1	Lee (2)	4,370
26 December	Hartlepools United	A	L	0–2		5,531
28 December	Hartlepools United	H	W	2–1	Read, Talbot	6,317
1 January	Tranmere Rovers	A	D	3–3	Talbot, Corbishley (pen.), Morris	8,504
11 January	Newport County	A	W	1–0	Metcalf	3,983
18 January	Stockport County	H	W	2–1	Morris (2)	5,403
25 January	Halifax Town	H	W	5–2	Corbishley (pen.), Talbot, Read, Metcalf (2)	6,253
1 February	Bradford Park Avenue	A	L	0–4		6,071
8 February	Chesterfield	H	W	4–2	Talbot (2), Morris, Metcalf	6,272
15 February	Doncaster Rovers	A	L	2–3	Metcalf, Talbot	6,554
22 February	Exeter City	A	L	0–3		6,579
29 February	Southport	H	W	5–0	Metcalf, Talbot (3), Bennion	6,187
4 March	Rochdale	A	L	0–1		2,322
7 March	Gillingham	A	L	1–2	Talbot	5,274
9 March	Aldershot	A	L	1–2	Read	2,951
13 March	Lincoln City	H	W	3–1	Talbot (2), Bennion	5,077
21 March	Bradford City	A	D	1–1	Bennion	4,405
27 March	York City	A	L	0–1		4,437
28 March	Tranmere Rovers	H	L	0–2		7,408
30 March	York City	H	D	1–1	Metcalf	4,326
4 April	Carlisle United	A	L	1–3	Talbot	6,940
11 April	Torquay United	H	W	2–1	Talbot, Metcalf	4,727
18 April	Halifax Town	A	L	0–1		3,227
25 April	Aldershot	H	W	2–0	Talbot, Humes	4,105

== FA Cup ==
Round	Date	Opponents	Venue	Result	Score	Scorers	Attendance
First round	16 November	Blyth Spartans (NEL)	H	W	3–2	Lee (2), Morris	9,366
Second round	7 December	Barrow (4)	H	L	0–1		8,373

== League Cup ==
Round	Date	Opponents	Venue	Result	Score	Scorers	Attendance
First round	4 September	Rochdale (4)	A	D	1–1	Corbishley (pen.)	2,919
First round replay	18 September	Rochdale (4)	H	L	2–5	Pritchard, Humes	5,073

== Welsh Cup ==
Round	Date	Opponents	Venue	Result	Score	Scorers	Attendance
Fifth round	29 January	Borough United (Welsh League (North))	H	W	5–1	Morris (3), Talbot, Lee	7,369
Quarterfinal	19 February	Cardiff City (2)	A	L	1–3	Talbot	3,281

== Season statistics ==
Nat	Player	Total		League		FA Cup		League Cup		Welsh Cup	
Nat	Player	A	G	A	G	A	G	A	G	A	G
Goalkeepers
(England)	Frank Adams	10	–	8	–	–	–	2	–	–	–
(England)	Reg Barton	6	–	6	–	–	–	–	–	–	–
(Scotland)	Dennis Reeves	36	–	32	–	2	–	–	–	2	–
Field players
(England)	Brian Bades	17	1	15	1	2	–	–	–	–	–
(England)	Stan Bennion	21	3	20	3	–	–	1	–	–	–
(England)	John Butler	51	–	45	–	2	–	2	–	2	–
(England)	Colin Corbishley	46	8	41	7	2	–	1	1	2	–
(Scotland)	John Currie	2	–	2	–	–	–	–	–	–	–
(Wales)	George Evans	28	–	25	–	–	–	2	–	1	–
(England)	John Evans	31	–	27	–	2	–	–	–	2	–
(Republic of Ireland)	Peter Fitzgerald	1	–	1	–	–	–	–	–	–	–
(England)	Bernard Fleming	21	–	18	–	–	–	2	–	1	–
(England)	Andy Haddock	14	–	12	–	1	–	1	–	–	–
(South Africa)	Peter Hauser	26	–	22	–	2	–	2	–	–	–
(England)	Jimmy Humes	25	4	22	3	1	–	1	1	1	–
(England)	Ray Jones	14	–	14	–	–	–	–	–	–	–
(England)	Garth Lee	30	10	27	7	2	2	–	–	1	1
(Scotland)	Jimmy McGill	9	–	7	–	–	–	2	–	–	–
(Scotland)	George McGowan	15	–	3	–	–	–	1	–	–	–
(England)	Mike Metcalf	26	8	24	8	–	–	–	–	2	–
(England)	John Molyneux	27	–	23	–	2	–	2	–	–	–
(Wales)	Elfed Morris	28	12	24	8	2	1	–	–	2	3
(England)	Alan Pritchard	3	1	2	–	–	–	1	1	–	–
(England)	David Read	36	4	32	4	–	–	2	–	2	–
(England)	Malcolm Starkey	23	–	21	–	–	–	–	–	2	–
(England)	Gary Talbot	36	25	32	23	2	–	–	–	2	2
(England)	Gil Wheaton	1	–	1	–	–	–	–	–	–	–
	Own goals	–	1	–	1	–	–	–	–	–	–
	Total	52	77	46	65	2	3	2	3	2	6
