= List of Chester City F.C. seasons =

Chester City F.C. were a football club which existed from 1885 until 2010. From 1931 until 2000, and again from 2004 until 2009 they were members of the Football League, playing in the third or fourth tiers of English football. The club persistently had one of the poorest playing records of any Football League sides, and was re-elected to the League on no fewer than seven occasions. From the early 1980s onwards, the club was plagued with financial troubles, selling their Sealand Road ground in 1990 to clear debts. Following their second relegation from the Football League to the Football Conference in 2009, these troubles came to a head, and the club was wound up by HMRC in March 2010.

== Key ==
- Top scorer and number of goals scored shown in bold when he was also top scorer for the division.
- Year shown in bold if club season article is created.
- QR1 (2, etc.) = Qualifying Cup rounds
- G = Group stage
- R1 (2, etc.) = Proper Cup rounds
- QF = Quarter-finalists
- SF = Semi-finalists
- F = Finalists
- A (QF, SF, F) = Area quarter-, semi-, finalists
- W = Winners

== Seasons ==
Year	League														Cup competitions							Manager
Year	Division	Lvl	Pld	W	D	L	GF	GA	GD	Pts	Position	Leading league scorer		Average attendance	FA Cup		League Cup		Other competitions			Manager
Year	Division	Lvl	Pld	W	D	L	GF	GA	GD	Pts	Position	Name	Goals	Average attendance	Res	Rec	Res	Rec	Competition	Res	Rec	Manager
Club were founded in August 1885 as an amalgamation of Chester Rovers and Old King's Scholars.
1885–86																			Welsh Cup	R1	0–0–1	
1886–87															R2 (Note: Disqualified for playing four unregistered players.)	1–0–0			Welsh Cup	R2	1–1–1	
1887–88															R1	0–0–1						
1888–89															QR4	3–0–1						
1889–90															R1	4–0–1						
1890–91	**The Combination**		16	8	4	4	42	30	+12	20	**3rd of 9**				R2	4–0–1						
1891–92	**The Combination**		22	8	3	11	52	61	−9	19	**8th of 12**				QR2	1–0–1						
1892–93	**The Combination**		22	12	2	8	52	41	+11	26	**3rd of 12**				QR3	2–0–1						
1893–94	**The Combination**		18	6	6	6	24	26	−2	18	**6th of 10**				QR2	0–0–1						
1894–95	**The Combination**		20	12	2	6	53	35	−18	26	**3rd of 11**				QR1	0–0–1						
1895–96	**The Combination**		14	4	2	8	27	29	−2	10	**5th of 8**				QR2	1–0–1						
1896–97	**The Combination**		17	10	3	4	37	25	+12	23	**3rd of 10**				QR1	0–0–1						
1897–98	**The Combination**		24	7	5	12	39	50	−11	19	**11th of 13**				QR1	0–0–1						
1898–99	**The Combination**		28	13	5	10	60	57	+3	31	**6th of 15**				QR1	0–0–1						
Left the Combination and did not participate in any competition until 1901.
1901–02	**The Combination**		26	6	7	13	46	67	−21	17 (Note: 2 points deducted for fielding ineligible player.)	**14th of 14**				QR1	1–1–0						
1902–03	**The Combination**		26	9	8	9	48	49	−1	26	**7th of 14**				—				Welsh Cup	R3	0–0–1	
1903–04	**The Combination**		24	15	3	6	65	29	+36	33	**2nd of 13**				—				Welsh Cup	R3	0–0–1	
1904–05	**The Combination**		26	17	3	6	69	35	+34	37	**2nd of 14**				—				Welsh Cup	R3	0–0–1	
1905–06	**The Combination**		28	16	4	8	72	29	+43	36	**2nd of 15**				QR2	1–0–1						
1906–07	**The Combination**		26	19	3	4	75	27	+48	41	**2nd of 14**				—				Welsh Cup	SF	2–1–1	
1907–08	**The Combination**		26	21	2	3	87	29	+58	44	**2nd of 14**				QR1	0–0–1			Welsh Cup	W	4–1–0	
1908–09	**The Combination**		30	21	7	2	91	34	+57	49	**1st of 16**				QR3	2–0–1			Welsh Cup	F	3–0–1	
1909–10	**The Combination**		30	20	2	8	85	47	+38	42	**3rd of 16**				PR	0–0–1			Welsh Cup	F	2–1–1	
Accepted to the Lancashire Combination.
1910–11	**Lancashire Combination**; **Division Two**		38	26	4	8	104	51	+53	56	**3rd of 20**; Promoted				QR4	4–0–1			Welsh Cup	R3	0–1–1	
1911–12	**Lancashire Combination**; **Division One**		32	15	7	10	74	50	+24	37	**6th of 17**				QR4	3–0–1			Welsh Cup	R4	3–1–1	
1912–13	**Lancashire Combination**; **Division One**		34	12	13	9	89	64	+25	37	**7th of 18**				PR	0–0–1			Welsh Cup	SF	2–1–1	
1913–14	**Lancashire Combination**; **Division One**		34	9	10	15	59	62	−3	28	**12th of 18**				QR2	2–0–1			Welsh Cup	R3	0–0–1	
1914–15	**Lancashire Combination**; **Division One**		Club did not finish the season due to the World War I.												QR2	1–0–1			Welsh Cup	R4	1–1–1	
No competitive football was played between 1915 and 1919 due to the World War I.
1919–20	**Cheshire County League**		22	9	4	9	55	55	0	22	**6th of 12**				PR	0–0–1			Welsh Cup	R4	0–0–1	
1920–21	**Cheshire County League**		34	15	5	14	72	74	−2	35	**10th of 18**				—				Welsh Cup	PR2	3–1–1	
1921–22	**Cheshire County League**		38	25	3	10	78	50	+28	53	**1st of 20**				QR4	5–2–1						
1922–23	**Cheshire County League**		38	13	8	17	59	60	−1	34	**15th of 20**				PR	0–0–1						
1923–24	**Cheshire County League**		42	11	15	16	59	66	−7	37	**16th of 22**				QR2	2–0–1						
1924–25	**Cheshire County League**		42	14	7	21	59	103	−44	35	**17th of 22**				PR	0–0–1						
1925–26	**Cheshire County League**		42	29	5	8	110	57	+53	63	**1st of 22**				QR3	3–3–1						
1926–27	**Cheshire County League**		42	31	3	8	147	67	+80	65	**1st of 22**				PR	0–0–1						
1927–28	**Cheshire County League**		42	23	6	13	120	73	+47	52	**5th of 22**				QR2	2–0–1						
1928–29	**Cheshire County League**		38	19	5	14	99	75	+24	43	**8th of 20**				PR	0–0–1			Welsh Cup	R4	1–0–1	
1929–30	**Cheshire County League**		42	18	5	19	120	109	+11	41	**9th of 22**				—				Welsh Cup	R4	1–2–1	
1930–31	**Cheshire County League**		42	31	6	5	170	59	+111	68	**2nd of 22**				EPR	0–0–1			Welsh Cup	QF	3–2–1	Charlie Hewitt
The club elected to the Football League replacing Nelson.
**1931–32**	**Football League**; **Third Division North**	3	40	21	8	11	78	60	+18	60	**3rd of 21**	Tom Jennings	30	7,952	R2	1–0–1			Welsh Cup	SF	2–1–1	Charlie Hewitt
**1932–33**	**Football League**; **Third Division North**	3	42	22	8	12	94	66	+28	52	**4th of 22**	Joe Mantle	34	8,136	R4	3–1–1			Welsh Cup	W	4–0–0	Charlie Hewitt
**1933–34**	**Football League**; **Third Division North**	3	42	17	6	19	89	86	+3	40	**10th of 22**	Joe Mantle	18	6,609	R2	1–0–1			Welsh Cup	QF	1–0–1	Charlie Hewitt
**1934–35**	**Football League**; **Third Division North**	3	42	20	14	8	91	58	+23	54	**3rd of 22**	John Wallbanks	24	6,967	R3	2–0–1			Welsh Cup	F	3–1–1	Charlie Hewitt
**1935–36**	**Football League**; **Third Division North**	3	42	22	11	9	100	45	+55	55	**2nd of 22**	Paddy Wrightson	27	6,654	R2	1–1–1			Welsh Cup	F	3–0–1	Charlie Hewitt
**1936–37**	**Football League**; **Third Division North**	3	42	22	9	11	87	57	+30	53	**3rd of 22**	Paddy Wrightson	32	7,828	R4	1–0–1			Welsh Cup	QF	1–0–1	Alex Raisbeck
**1937–38**	**Football League**; **Third Division North**	3	42	16	12	14	77	72	+5	44	**9th of 22**	Charlie Sargeant	16	5,417	R3	0–0–1			Welsh Cup	QF	1–1–0	Alex Raisbeck
**1938–39**	**Football League**; **Third Division North**	3	42	20	9	13	88	70	+18	49	**6th of 22**	Bill Pendergast	26	5,963	R4	3–3–1			Welsh Cup	SF	1–0–1	Frank Brown
1939–40	**Football League**; **Third Division North**	3	3	2	1	0	5	2	+3	5	**3rd of 22**	Joe McGough	2	6,463					Welsh Cup	QF	1–0–1	Frank Brown
1939–40	**Football League**; **Third Division North**	3	Season abandoned.											6,463					Welsh Cup	QF	1–0–1	Frank Brown
No competitive football was played between 1939 and 1946 due to the World War II.
1945–46															R3	0–0–2						Frank Brown
**1946–47**	**Football League**; **Third Division North**	3	42	25	6	11	95	51	+44	56	**3rd of 22**	Dick Yates	36	6,466	R4	1–1–1			Welsh Cup	W	4–1–0	Frank Brown
**1947–48**	**Football League**; **Third Division North**	3	42	13	9	20	64	67	−3	35	**20th of 22**	Tommy Burden	12	7,847	R4	3–0–1			Welsh Cup	R5	0–0–1	Frank Brown
**1948–49**	**Football League**; **Third Division North**	3	42	11	13	18	57	56	+1	35	**18th of 22**	Cam Burgess; Albert Foulds	14	6,959	R2	1–0–1			Welsh Cup	R5	0–0–1	Frank Brown
**1949–50**	**Football League**; **Third Division North**	3	42	17	6	19	70	79	−9	40	**12th of 22**	Cam Burgess	24	6,695	R2	1–0–1			Welsh Cup	SF	2–3–1	Frank Brown
**1950–51**	**Football League**; **Third Division North**	3	46	17	9	20	62	64	−2	43	**13th of 24**	Cam Burgess	22	5,951	R1	0–0–1			Welsh Cup	QF	1–0–1	Frank Brown
**1951–52**	**Football League**; **Third Division North**	3	46	15	9	22	72	85	−13	39	**19th of 24**	Roger Kirkpatrick	10	6,146	R3	2–1–1			Welsh Cup	QF	1–1–1	Frank Brown
**1952–53**	**Football League**; **Third Division North**	3	46	11	15	20	64	85	−21	37	**20th of 24**	Don Travis	24	5,271	R1	0–0–1			Welsh Cup	F	4–0–1	Frank Brown
**1953–54**	**Football League**; **Third Division North**	3	46	11	10	25	48	67	−19	32	**24th of 24**	Don Travis	12	5,503	R1	0–0–1			Welsh Cup	F	3–1–1	Louis Page
**1954–55**	**Football League**; **Third Division North**	3	46	12	9	25	44	77	−33	33	**24th of 24**	Ron Hughes	9	5,390	R1	0–0–1			Welsh Cup	F	3–2–1	Louis Page
**1955–56**	**Football League**; **Third Division North**	3	46	13	14	19	52	82	−30	40	**17th of 24**	George Allman	12	6,640	R1	0–0–1			Welsh Cup	QF	1–0–1	Louis Page
**1956–57**	**Football League**; **Third Division North**	3	46	10	13	23	55	84	−29	33	**21st of 24**	Billy Foulkes	11	6,472	R1	0–1–1			Welsh Cup	SF	2–0–1	John Harris
**1957–58**	**Football League**; **Third Division North**	3	46	13	13	20	73	81	−8	39	**21st of 24**	Barry Jepson	23	6,740	R2	1–1–1			Welsh Cup	F	3–2–1	John Harris
Regional Third divisions merged creating nationwide Third Division and Fourth Division. Club did not qualify to join Third Division.
**1958–59**	**Football League**; **Fourth Division**	4	46	16	12	18	72	84	−12	44	**13th of 24**	Norman Bullock	12	6,953	R2	1–1–1			Welsh Cup	R6	0–0–1	John Harris
**1959–60**	**Football League**; **Fourth Division**	4	46	14	12	20	59	77	−18	40	**20th of 24**	Walter Kelly	12	5,421	R2	1–0–1			Welsh Cup	R5	0–0–1	Stan Pearson
**1960–61**	**Football League**; **Fourth Division**	4	46	11	9	26	61	104	−43	31	**24th of 24**	Ron Davies	23	4,892	R1	0–0–1	R1	0–1–1	Welsh Cup	QF	1–0–1	Stan Pearson
**1961–62**	**Football League**; **Fourth Division**	4	44	7	12	25	54	96	−44	26	**23rd of 23**	Ron Davies	14	5,578	R1	1–0–1	R1	0–0–1	Welsh Cup	R4	0–0–1	Stan Pearson; Bill Lambton
**1962–63**	**Football League**; **Fourth Division**	4	46	15	9	22	51	66	−15	39	**21st of 24**	Peter Fitzgerald	8	5,542	R1	0–0–1	R3	2–1–1	Welsh Cup	R5	0–0–1	Bill Lambton
**1963–64**	**Football League**; **Fourth Division**	4	46	19	8	19	65	60	+5	46	**12th of 24**	Gary Talbot	23	6,182	R2	1–0–1	R1	0–1–1	Welsh Cup	QF	1–0–1	Peter Hauser
**1964–65**	**Football League**; **Fourth Division**	4	46	25	6	15	119	81	+38	56	**8th of 24**	Gary Talbot	28	7,659	R3	2–0–1	R3	2–0–1	Welsh Cup	SF	2–3–1	Peter Hauser
**1965–66**	**Football League**; **Fourth Division**	4	46	20	12	14	79	70	+9	52	**7th of 24**	Elfed Morris	24	8,504	R3	2–0–1	R1	0–0–1	Welsh Cup	F	4–1–2	Peter Hauser
**1966–67**	**Football League**; **Fourth Division**	4	46	15	10	21	54	78	−24	40	**19th of 24**	Les Jones	13	5,156	R1	0–0–1	R1	0–0–1	Welsh Cup	SF	2–1–1	Peter Hauser
**1967–68**	**Football League**; **Fourth Division**	4	46	9	14	23	57	78	−21	32	**22nd of 24**	Eddie Loyden	22	4,415	R2	1–0–1	R1	0–0–1	Welsh Cup	SF	2–0–1	Peter Hauser; Ken Roberts
**1968–69**	**Football League**; **Fourth Division**	4	46	16	13	17	76	66	+10	45	**14th of 24**	**Gary Talbot**	**22**	5,883	R2	1–1–1	R1	0–3–1	Welsh Cup	SF	2–0–1	Ken Roberts
**1969–70**	**Football League**; **Fourth Division**	4	46	21	6	19	58	66	−8	45	**11th of 24**	Derek Draper	12	4,444	R4	3–2–1	R1	0–0–1	Welsh Cup	F	3–1–2	Ken Roberts
**1970–71**	**Football League**; **Fourth Division**	4	46	24	7	15	69	55	+14	55	**5th of 24**	Alan Tarbuck	18	5,081	R3	2–1–1	R2	1–1–1	Welsh Cup	SF	2–2–1	Ken Roberts
**1971–72**	**Football League**; **Fourth Division**	4	46	10	18	18	47	56	−9	38	**20th of 24**	Eddie Loyden	11	3,001	R1	0–1–1	R1	0–1–1	Welsh Cup	QF	1–1–1	Ken Roberts
**1972–73**	**Football League**; **Fourth Division**	4	46	14	15	17	61	52	+9	43	**15th of 24**	Derek Draper	13	2,796	R1	0–1–1	R2	1–2–1	Welsh Cup	SF	2–1–1	Ken Roberts
**1973–74**	**Football League**; **Fourth Division**	4	46	17	15	14	54	55	−1	49	**7th of 24**	John James	21	2,538	R3	2–0–1	R1	0–0–1	Welsh Cup	QF	1–0–1	Ken Roberts
**1974–75**	**Football League**; **Fourth Division**	4	46	23	11	12	64	38	+26	57	**4th of 24**; Promoted	Terry Owen	14	4,742	R1	0–0–1	SF	5–2–1	Welsh Cup	R4	0–0–1	Ken Roberts
**1975–76**	**Football League**; **Third Division**	3	46	15	12	19	43	62	−19	42	**17th of 24**	Terry Owen	11	4,902	R2	1–1–1	R1	0–1–1	Welsh Cup	SF	2–2–1	Ken Roberts
**1976–77**	**Football League**; **Third Division**	3	46	18	8	20	48	58	−10	44	**13th of 24**	Paul Crossley	14	4,408	R5	4–0–1	R2	1–0–2	Welsh Cup	R4	0–1–1	Ken Roberts; Alan Oakes
**1977–78**	**Football League**; **Third Division**	3	46	16	22	8	59	56	+3	54	**5th of 24**	Paul Crossley	9	3,959	R2	1–0–1	R1	1–0–1	Welsh Cup	R4	0–0–1	Alan Oakes
**1978–79**	**Football League**; **Third Division**	3	46	14	16	16	57	61	−4	44	**16th of 24**	Ian Edwards	20	3,850	R2	1–1–1	R3	2–1–1	Welsh Cup	SF	2–1–1	Alan Oakes
**1979–80**	**Football League**; **Third Division**	3	46	17	13	16	49	57	−8	47	**9th of 24**	Ian Rush	14	3,726	R5	4–0–1	R2	1–2–1	Welsh Cup	QF	1–1–1	Alan Oakes
**1980–81**	**Football League**; **Third Division**	3	46	15	11	20	38	48	−10	41	**18th of 24**	Steve Ludlam; Trevor Phillips	7	2,892	R1	0–0–1	R1	0–1–1				Alan Oakes
**1981–82**	**Football League**; **Third Division**	3	46	7	11	28	36	78	−42	32	**24th of 24**; Relegated	Gary Simpson	12	2,062	R1	0–0–1	R1	0–1–1				Alan Oakes; Cliff Sear
**1982–83**	**Football League**; **Fourth Division**	4	46	15	11	20	55	60	−5	56	**13th of 24**	John Thomas	20	2,071	R1	0–1–1	R1	0–0–2				Cliff Sear; John Sainty
Changed name to Chester City F.C. from original Chester F.C.
**1983–84**	**Football League**; **Fourth Division**	4	46	7	13	26	45	82	−37	34	**24th of 24**	Peter Zelem; Andy Holden	7	1,764	R1	0–0–1	R2	2–0–2	FL Trophy	R2	1–0–1	John Sainty; Trevor Storton; John McGrath
**1984–85**	**Football League**; **Fourth Division**	4	46	15	9	22	60	72	−12	54	**16th of 24**	Stuart Rimmer	14	1,940	R1	0–0–1	R1	0–0–2	FL Trophy	R1	0–1–1	John McGrath; Mick Speight
**1985–86**	**Football League**; **Fourth Division**	4	46	24	15	9	83	50	+33	84	**2nd of 24**; Promoted	Stuart Rimmer	16	2,956	R1	0–0–1	R2	1–1–2	FL Trophy	G	0–0–2	Harry McNally
**1986–87**	**Football League**; **Third Division**	3	46	13	17	16	61	59	+2	56	**15th of 24**	Stuart Rimmer; Gary Bennett	13	2,732	R4	3–3–1	R1	1–0–1	FL Trophy	AF	4–2–1	Harry McNally
**1987–88**	**Football League**; **Third Division**	3	46	14	16	16	51	62	−11	58	**15th of 24**	Stuart Rimmer	24	2,664	R1	0–0–1	R1	1–0–1	FL Trophy	R1	1–0–2	Harry McNally
**1988–89**	**Football League**; **Third Division**	3	46	19	11	16	64	61	+3	68	**8th of 24**	Carl Dale	22	3,056	R2	1–0–1	R2	1–0–3	FL Trophy	G	0–1–1	Harry McNally
**1989–90**	**Football League**; **Third Division**	3	46	13	15	18	43	55	−12	54	**16th of 24**	Carl Dale	8	2,560	R2	1–1–1	R1	0–0–2	FL Trophy	AQF	2–2–2	Harry McNally
**1990–91**	**Football League**; **Third Division**	3	46	14	9	23	46	58	−12	51	**19th of 24**	Carl Dale	10	1,564	R3	2–2–1	R2	1–0–3	FL Trophy	G	1–0–1	Harry McNally
**1991–92**	**Football League**; **Third Division**	3	46	14	14	18	56	59	−3	56	**18th of 24**	Stuart Rimmer	13	1,857	R2	1–0–1	R2	1–0–3	FL Trophy	R1	1–0–2	Harry McNally
Football League divisions renamed after the Premier League creation.
**1992–93**	**Football League**; **Second Division**	3	46	8	5	33	49	102	−53	29	**24th of 24**; Relegated	Stuart Rimmer	20	2,992	R1	0–1–1	R1	0–1–1	FL Trophy	G	0–0–2	Harry McNally; Graham Barrow
**1993–94**	**Football League**; **Third Division**	4	42	21	11	10	69	46	+23	74	**2nd of 24**; Promoted	David Pugh	12	3,191	R3	2–1–1	R1	0–1–1	FL Trophy	AQF	2–1–1	Graham Barrow
**1994–95**	**Football League**; **Second Division**	3	46	6	11	29	37	84	−47	29	**23rd of 24**; Relegated	Andy Milner	8	2,388	R2	1–0–1	R1	0–0–2	FL Trophy	R2	1–1–1	Mike Pejic; Derek Mann
**1995–96**	**Football League**; **Third Division**	4	46	18	16	12	72	53	+19	70	**8th of 24**	Stuart Rimmer; Chris Priest	13	2,674	R1	0–0–1	R2	2–0–2	FL Trophy	G	0–1–1	Kevin Ratcliffe
**1996–97**	**Football League**; **Third Division**	4	46	18	16	12	55	43	+12	70	**6th of 24**	Andy Milner	12	2,263	R3	2–0–1	R1	0–0–2	FL Trophy	R1	0–0–1	Kevin Ratcliffe
**1996–97**	**Football League**; **Third Division**	4	Lost in the **play-off** semifinal.									Andy Milner	12	2,263	R3	2–0–1	R1	0–0–2	FL Trophy	R1	0–0–1	Kevin Ratcliffe
**1997–98**	**Football League**; **Third Division**	4	46	17	10	19	60	61	−1	61	**14th of 24**	Gary Bennett	11	2,255	R2	1–0–1	R1	0–0–2	FL Trophy	R1	0–0–1	Kevin Ratcliffe
**1998–99**	**Football League**; **Third Division**	4	46	13	18	15	57	66	−9	57	**14th of 24**	John Murphy	12	2,562	R1	0–0–1	R2	1–1–2	FL Trophy	R1	0–0–1	Kevin Ratcliffe
**1999–2000**	**Football League**; **Third Division**	4	46	10	9	27	44	79	−35	39	**24th of 24**; Relegated	Luke Beckett	14	2,686	R3	2–1–1	R2	1–1–2	FL Trophy	R2	0–0–1	Kevin Ratcliffe; Terry Smith; Ian Atkins
2000–01	**Football Conference**	5	42	16	14	12	49	43	+6	62	**8th of 24**	Mark Beesley	11	1,903	R3	3–1–1	—		FL Trophy	R2	1–0–1	Graham Barrow
2000–01	**Football Conference**	5	42	16	14	12	49	43	+6	62	**8th of 24**	Mark Beesley	11	1,903	R3	3–1–1	—		FA Trophy	SF	4–0–2	Graham Barrow
2001–02	**Football Conference**	5	42	15	9	18	54	51	+3	54	**14th of 24**	Mark Beesley	16	1,274	QR4	0–0–1	—		FA Trophy	QF	3–2–1	Gordon Hill; Steve Mungall; Mark Wright
2002–03	**Football Conference**	5	42	21	12	9	59	31	+28	75	**4th of 24**	Daryl Clare	17	2,406	R2	2–0–1	—		FL Trophy	R1	0–0–1	Mark Wright
2002–03	**Football Conference**	5	Lost in the **play-off** semi-final.									Daryl Clare	17	2,406	R2	2–0–1	—		FA Trophy	R3	0–0–1	Mark Wright
2003–04	**Football Conference**	5	42	27	11	4	85	34	+51	92	**1st of 24**; Promoted	**Daryl Clare**	**29**	3,065	R1	1–0–1	—		FL Trophy	R1	0–0–1	Mark Wright
2003–04	**Football Conference**	5	42	27	11	4	85	34	+51	92	**1st of 24**; Promoted	**Daryl Clare**	**29**	3,065	R1	1–0–1	—		FA Trophy	R3	0–0–1	Mark Wright
**2004–05**	**Football League Two**	4	46	12	16	18	43	69	−26	52	**20th of 24**	Michael Branch	11	2,812	R3	2–0–1	R1	0–0–1	FL Trophy	AQF	2–0–1	Ian Rush
**2005–06**	**Football League Two**	4	46	14	12	20	53	59	−6	54	**15th of 24**	Ryan Lowe	10	2,964	R3	2–1–1	R1	0–0–1	FL Trophy	R1	0–0–1	Keith Curle; Mark Wright
**2006–07**	**Football League Two**	4	46	13	14	19	40	48	−8	53	**18th of 24**	Jonathan Walters	9	2,473	R3	1–2–2	R1	0–0–1	FL Trophy	AQF	1–1–0	Mark Wright
**2007–08**	**Football League Two**	4	46	12	11	23	51	68	−17	47	**22nd of 24**	Kevin Ellison	11	2,479	R1	0–0–1	R1	0–1–0	FL Trophy	R2	0–1–1	Bobby Williamson; Simon Davies
**2008–09**	**Football League Two**	4	46	8	13	25	43	81	−38	37	**23rd of 24**; Relegated	Ryan Lowe	16	1,972	R1	0–0–1	R1	0–0–1	FL Trophy	R2	0–1–0	Simon Davies; Mark Wright
2009–10	**Conference National**	5	28	5	7	16	23	42	−19	−3 (Note: Club was docked 25 points for entering administration and financial insolvency.)	—	Nick Chadwick	7	1,161	QR4	0–1–1	—		FA Trophy	R	0–0–1	Mick Wadsworth; Jim Harvey
2009–10	**Conference National**	5	did not finish the **season**.									Nick Chadwick	7	1,161	QR4	0–1–1	—		FA Trophy	R	0–0–1	Mick Wadsworth; Jim Harvey
Club was expelled from the Football Conference, record was expunged. Subsequently Chester City wound up. New club Chester was formed and joined Northern Premier League Division One North for the next season.
