= 1968–69 Chester F.C. season =

Chester
1968–69 season
- Manager: Ken Roberts
- Stadium: Sealand Road
- Football League Fourth Division: 14th
- FA Cup: Second round
- Football League Cup: First round
- Welsh Cup: Semifinal
- Top goalscorer: League: Gary Talbot (22); All: Gary Talbot (29)
- Highest home attendance: 13,943 vs Wrexham (17 November)
- Lowest home attendance: 2,468 vs Lincoln City (23 April)
- Average home league attendance: 5,883; 8th in division

The 1968–69 season was the 31st season of competitive association football in the Football League played by Chester, an English club based in Chester, Cheshire.

It was their eleventh season in the Fourth Division since its establishment. In addition to their participation in the Football League, the club also competed in the FA Cup, Football League Cup and the Welsh Cup.

== Football League ==
Pos	Team	Pld	W	D	L	GF	GA	GAv	Pts
12	Workington	46	15	17	14	40	43	0.930	47
13	Port Vale	46	16	14	16	46	46	1.000	46
14	Chester	46	16	13	17	76	66	1.152	45
15	Aldershot	46	19	7	20	66	66	1.000	45
16	Scunthorpe United	46	18	8	20	61	60	1.017	44

Source: rsssf.com
Rules for classification: 1) points; 2) goal average; 3) number of goals scored.

=== Results summary ===
Overall								Home						Away					
Pld	W	D	L	GF	GA	GAv	Pts	W	D	L	GF	GA	Pts	W	D	L	GF	GA	Pts
46	16	13	17	76	66	1.152	45	12	4	7	43	24	28	4	9	10	33	42	17

Source: rsssf.com

=== Results by matchday ===
Round	1	2	3	4	5	6	7	8	9	10	11	12	13	14	15	16	17	18	19	20	21	22	23	24	25	26	27	28	29	30	31	32	33	34	35	36	37	38	39	40	41	42	43	44	45	46
Result	W	L	W	D	W	W	D	D	W	W	W	L	D	W	D	L	D	L	L	L	W	L	W	L	W	W	D	D	D	W	D	D	D	D	W	L	L	L	L	W	L	L	L	W	L	L
Position	1	11	4	3	4	1	2	3	3	3	2	3	3	2	2	3	3	3	5	8	6	9	5	7	4	6	6	7	7	3	5	4	5	5	2	3	3	5	9	8	8	9	11	10	10	10

Source: statto.com
W = Win; D = Draw; L = Loss

=== Matches ===
Date	Opponents	Venue	Result	Score	Scorers	Attendance
10 August	York City	H	W	2–0	Sear, Dearden	7,104
17 August	Bradford City	A	L	0–2		6,065
24 August	Colchester United	H	W	5–1	L. Jones (2), Dearden, Talbot, Sutton	5,813
30 August	Scunthorpe United	A	D	2–2	Talbot, Brodie	5,072
3 September	Doncaster Rovers	H	W	2–1	Ashworth, Provan	6,564
6 September	Port Vale	H	W	2–0	Metcalf, Talbot	8,144
14 September	Exeter City	A	D	2–2	Talbot, Sutton	5,121
18 September	Brentford	H	D	2–2	Talbot, Brodie	8,638
21 September	Chesterfield	H	W	2–0	Talbot, Ashworth	6,785
28 September	Peterborough United	A	W	2–1	Sutton, Brodie	6,897
5 October	Swansea Town	H	W	3–0	Dearden, Sutton, Talbot	7,417
8 October	Doncaster Rovers	A	L	3–4	Dearden, Metcalf, Sutton	10,171
12 October	Bradford Park Avenue	A	D	1–1	Talbot	2,969
19 October	Aldershot	H	W	3–1	Talbot (2), Metcalf	6,750
26 October	Grimsby Town	A	D	0–0		2,838
2 November	Southend United	H	L	1–2	Ashworth	5,508
6 November	Wrexham	H	D	1–1	Talbot	13,943
9 November	Notts County	A	L	2–3	Talbot, Dearden	3,089
23 November	Lincoln City	A	L	0–2		6,033
30 November	Workington	H	L	0–2		5,205
14 December	Bradford Park Avenue	H	W	4–1	Provan, Dearden, Sutton, Ashworth (pen.)	3,182
21 December	Aldershot	A	L	0–4		5,595
28 December	Swansea Town	A	W	5–0	Dearden, Provan (2), Brodie, Talbot	11,879
4 January	Darlington	H	L	1–2	Sutton	5,902
10 January	Southend United	A	W	2–1	Talbot, Birks (o.g.)	11,342
18 January	Notts County	H	W	3–1	Ashworth (2), L. Jones	5,033
25 January	Wrexham	A	D	1–1	Bermingham (o.g.)	13,955
1 February	Halifax Town	A	D	0–0		4,181
15 February	Workington	A	D	0–0		1,843
22 February	Newport County	H	W	4–0	Provan (2), Dearden, Draper	4,690
3 March	Darlington	A	D	2–2	Talbot (2)	5,341
8 March	Bradford City	H	D	0–0		7,219
12 March	Halifax Town	H	D	2–2	Provan, Talbot	4,452
14 March	Colchester United	A	D	1–1	Draper	7,312
17 March	Newport County	A	W	5–2	Talbot (3), Provan, Dearden	1,636
22 March	Scunthorpe United	H	L	0–2		5,483
26 March	Grimsby Town	H	L	0–1		4,051
29 March	Port Vale	A	L	1–2	Provan	4,690
5 April	Peterborough United	H	L	2–3	Talbot, Ashworth (pen.)	4,182
8 April	Rochdale	H	W	2–1	Provan, Dearden	3,820
12 April	Chesterfield	A	L	0–2		3,554
14 April	Rochdale	A	L	1–4	Talbot	4,884
19 April	Exeter City	H	L	0–1		2,958
23 April	Lincoln City	H	W	2–0	Provan, Draper	2,468
28 April	York City	A	L	2–4	Dearden, Provan	3,397
30 April	Brentford	A	L	1–2	Nelmes (o.g.)	4,090

== FA Cup ==
Round	Date	Opponents	Venue	Result	Score	Scorers	Attendance
First round	9 December	Bradford City (4)	A	W	2–1	Dearden, Talbot	7,404
Second round	6 January	Lincoln City (4)	H	D	1–1	Dearden	6,065
Second round replay	6 January	Lincoln City (4)	A	L	1–2	L. Jones	9,703

== League Cup ==
Round	Date	Opponents	Venue	Result	Score	Scorers	Attendance
First round	14 August	Tranmere Rovers (3)	H	D	0–0		8,146
First round replay	21 August	Tranmere Rovers (3)	A	D	2–2	Talbot, Cumbes (o.g.)	11,476
First round second replay	26 August	Tranmere Rovers (3)	A	D	1–1	Sutton	13,627
First round third replay	28 August	Tranmere Rovers (3)	H	L	1–2	Ashworth	13,017

== Welsh Cup ==
Round	Date	Opponents	Venue	Result	Score	Scorers	Attendance
Fifth round	16 January	Rhyl (CCL)	A	W	3–0	Talbot (2), Dearden	
Quarterfinal	12 February	Lovell's Athletic (Welsh League South)	H	W	5–1	L. Jones, Talbot (3), Provan	2,385
Semifinal	19 March	Cardiff City (2)	H	L	0–2		8,404

== Season statistics ==
Nat	Player	Total		League		FA Cup		League Cup		Welsh Cup	
Nat	Player	A	G	A	G	A	G	A	G	A	G
Goalkeepers
(England)	Terry Carling	55	–	45	–	3	–	4	–	3	–
(Wales)	Grenville Millington	1	–	1	–	–	–	–	–	–	–
Field players
(England)	Barry Ashworth	52	8	42	7	3	–	4	1	3	–
(England)	John Bennett	16+2	–	12+1	–	1	–	1+1	–	2	–
(Scotland)	Eric Brodie	40+1	4	32+1	4	2	–	4	–	2	–
(England)	Roy Cheetham	23	–	21	–	–	–	–	–	2	–
(Scotland)	Mick Cullerton	5+2	–	5+2	–	–	–	–	–	–	–
(England)	Bill Dearden	54	14	45	11	3	2	4	–	2	1
(Wales)	Derek Draper	23	3	21	3	–	–	–	–	2	–
(Wales)	Nigel Edwards	3	–	3	–	–	–	–	–	–	–
(Wales)	George Evans	1+3	–	1+2	–	–	–	–	–	0+1	–
(Wales)	Les Jones	30+1	5	23+1	3	2	1	3	–	2	1
(England)	Ray Jones	37+2	–	29+1	–	3	–	4	–	1+1	–
(England)	Mike Metcalf	27	3	20	3	3	–	4	–	–	–
(Scotland)	Andy Provan	39+4	13	33+4	12	3	–	1	–	3	1
(England)	Albert Robinson	2+1	–	2+1	–	–	–	–	–	–	–
(Wales)	Cliff Sear	46	1	38	1	3	–	3	–	2	–
(England)	Mike Sutton	54+1	8	45+1	7	2	–	4	1	3	–
(England)	Gary Talbot	53	29	43	22	3	1	4	1	3	5
(England)	Graham Turner	53	–	44	–	2	–	4	–	3	–
(England)	Don Weston	2+2	–	1+2	–	–	–	1	–	–	–
	Own goals	–	4	–	3	–	–	–	1	–	–
	Total	56	92	46	76	3	4	4	4	3	8
