= 1969–70 Chester F.C. season =

Chester F.C.
1969–70 season
- Manager: Ken Roberts
- Stadium: Sealand Road
- Football League Fourth Division: 11th
- FA Cup: Fourth round
- Football League Cup: First round
- Welsh Cup: Final
- Top goalscorer: League: Derek Draper (12); All: Bill Dearden (19)
- Highest home attendance: 15,024 vs Wrexham (26 December)
- Lowest home attendance: 1,691 vs Aldershot (30 April)
- Average home league attendance: 4,444; 14th in division

The 1969–70 season was the 32nd season of competitive association football in the Football League played by Chester, an English club based in Chester, Cheshire.

Also, it was the twelfth season spent in the Fourth Division after its creation. Alongside competing in the Football League the club also participated in the FA Cup, Football League Cup and the Welsh Cup.

== Football League ==
Pos	Team	Pld	W	D	L	GF	GA	GAv	Pts	Promotion or relegation
9	Peterborough United	46	17	14	15	77	69	1.116	48	Qualified for the Watney Cup (Note: The two teams who scored the most goals in each division, and did not qualify for Europe and were not promoted, qualified for the Watney Cup.)
10	Colchester United	46	17	14	15	64	63	1.016	48	
11	Chester	46	21	6	19	58	66	0.879	48	
12	Scunthorpe United	46	18	10	18	67	65	1.031	46	
13	York City	46	16	14	16	55	62	0.887	46	

Source: rsssf.com

=== Results summary ===
Overall								Home						Away					
Pld	W	D	L	GF	GA	GAv	Pts	W	D	L	GF	GA	Pts	W	D	L	GF	GA	Pts
46	21	6	19	58	66	0.879	48	14	3	6	39	23	31	7	3	13	19	43	17

Source: rsssf.com

=== Results by matchday ===
Round	1	2	3	4	5	6	7	8	9	10	11	12	13	14	15	16	17	18	19	20	21	22	23	24	25	26	27	28	29	30	31	32	33	34	35	36	37	38	39	40	41	42	43	44	45	46
Result	W	D	L	L	W	L	L	L	L	W	W	W	L	W	L	W	W	W	L	W	W	L	D	W	L	L	W	L	W	D	D	W	W	W	W	D	L	L	L	L	W	L	L	W	D	W
Position	6	9	15	15	11	14	19	20	23	20	16	14	14	14	16	13	12	10	12	10	9	10	9	9	10	12	9	12	12	12	11	10	8	7	7	7	7	8	11	12	10	12	12	12	11	11

Source: statto.com
W = Win; D = Draw; L = Loss

=== Matches ===
Date	Opponents	Venue	Result	Score	Scorers	Attendance
9 August	Scunthorpe United	A	W	3–2	Ashworth, Chapman (2)	3,480
16 August	Swansea City	H	D	2–2	Sutton, Chapman	5,988
23 August	Wrexham	A	L	0–2		11,959
27 August	Brentford	H	L	1–2	Bradbury	4,426
30 August	Workington	H	W	3–0	Draper, Sutton, Harley	3,684
6 September	Port Vale	A	L	0–3		6,874
13 September	Notts County	H	L	0–1		3,645
16 September	Grimsby Town	A	L	1–4	Draper	4,186
20 September	Lincoln City	A	L	0–2		4,482
27 September	Crewe Alexandra	H	W	2–1	Cheetham, Draper	3,722
1 October	Bradford Park Avenue	H	W	1–0	Draper	3,203
4 October	Darlington	A	W	2–1	Draper, Dearden	3,348
7 October	Swansea City	A	L	1–2	Dearden	6,884
11 October	Hartlepool	H	W	2–1	Ashworth, Goad (o.g.)	4,175
18 October	Chesterfield	H	L	1–2	Draper	4,436
25 October	Colchester United	A	W	1–0	Bradbury	3,754
1 November	Exeter City	H	W	2–0	Tarbuck (2)	4,487
8 November	Northampton Town	A	W	1–0	Tarbuck	5,659
22 November	Aldershot	A	L	1–3	Provan	5,385
26 November	Southend United	H	W	2–0	Provan, Dearden	4,501
29 November	York City	H	W	3–0	Tarbuck, Draper (2)	4,201
13 December	Notts County	A	L	0–3		4,231
20 December	Port Vale	H	D	1–1	Provan	5,235
26 December	Wrexham	H	W	2–0	Dearden (2)	15,024
10 January	Lincoln City	H	L	1–2	Provan	5,768
17 January	Crewe Alexandra	A	L	0–3		4,704
19 January	Bradford Park Avenue	A	W	2–1	Spence, Dearden	5,997
31 January	Darlington	H	L	1–3	Spence	4,290
7 February	Hartlepool	A	W	2–1	Provan, Gill (o.g.)	2,233
14 February	Scunthorpe United	H	D	1–1	Dearden	3,968
18 February	Workington	A	D	1–1	Webber	1,474
21 February	Northampton Town	H	W	2–1	Draper, Clarke (o.g.)	3,782
25 February	Newport County	H	W	2–0	Turner, Webber	3,664
28 February	Chesterfield	A	W	1–0	Dearden	13,154
11 March	Oldham Athletic	H	W	2–1	Dearden, Draper	4,522
13 March	York City	A	D	0–0		3,310
16 March	Newport County	A	L	1–3	Webber	3,664
21 March	Peterborough United	H	L	2–3	Cheetham (pen.), Dearden	4,024
28 March	Oldham Athletic	A	L	0–5		4,611
30 March	Exeter City	A	L	0–1		5,717
1 April	Colchester United	H	W	1–0	Tarbuck	2,580
4 April	Brentford	A	L	0–2		4,748
6 April	Southend United	A	L	2–4	Tarbuck, Dearden	5,512
15 April	Grimsby Town	H	W	3–1	Provan, Webber, Ashworth	2,186
18 April	Peterborough United	A	D	0–0		4,763
30 April	Aldershot	H	W	2–1	Draper (2)	1,691

== FA Cup ==
Round	Date	Opponents	Venue	Result	Score	Scorers	Attendance
First round	15 November	Halifax Town (3)	A	D	3–3	Tarbuck (2), Dearden	5,032
First round replay	19 November	Halifax Town (3)	H	W	1–0	Provan	8,352
Second round	6 December	Doncaster Rovers (3)	H	D	1–1	Tarbuck	7,705
Second round replay	9 December	Doncaster Rovers (3)	A	W	2–0	Webber, Dearden	10,822
Third round	3 January	Bristol City (2)	H	W	2–1	Webber, Dearden	10,030
Fourth round	24 January	Swindon Town (2)	A	L	2–4	Cheetham (pen), Lang	7,705

== League Cup ==
Round	Date	Opponents	Venue	Result	Score	Scorers	Attendance
First round	14 August	Aston Villa (3)	H	L	1–2	Dearden	10,510

== Welsh Cup ==
Round	Date	Opponents	Venue	Result	Score	Scorers	Attendance
Fifth round	14 January	Llandudno Borough	H	W	6–0	Edwards, Spence, Webber, Provan (3)	2,464
Quarterfinal	11 February	Llanelli (Welsh League South)	A	W	3–1	Turner, Dearden, Webber	1,925
Semifinal	18 March	Hereford United (SFL)	A	D	3–3	Dearden (2), Tarbuck	5,125
Semifinal replay	25 March	Hereford United (SFL)	H	W	3–0	Dearden, Draper (2)	3,916
Final first leg	8 May	Cardiff City (2)	H	L	0–1		3,087
Final second leg	15 May	Cardiff City (2)	A	L	0–4		5,567

== Season statistics ==
Nat	Player	Total		League		FA Cup		League Cup		Welsh Cup	
Nat	Player	A	G	A	G	A	G	A	G	A	G
Goalkeepers
(England)	Terry Carling	59	–	46	–	6	–	1	–	6	–
Field players
(England)	Barry Ashworth	39+2	3	34+2	3	–	–	1	–	4	–
(England)	Graham Birks	16	–	11	–	5	–	–	–	–	–
(England)	Terry Bradbury	58	2	45	2	6	–	1	–	6	–
(Scotland)	Eric Brodie	12	–	11	–	–	–	1	–	–	–
(Wales)	Alan Caughter	1+1	–	1+1	–	–	–	–	–	–	–
(England)	Roy Chapman	10	3	9	3	–	–	1	–	–	–
(England)	Roy Cheetham	55	3	43	2	6	1	1	–	5	–
(England)	Bill Dearden	50	19	40	11	5	3	1	1	4	4
(Wales)	Derek Draper	55+1	14	43+1	12	6	–	–	–	6	2
(Wales)	Nigel Edwards	19+6	1	13+4	–	1+2	–	–	–	5	1
(England)	Albert Harley	3	1	3	1	–	–	–	–	–	–
(Scotland)	Gavin Lang	1	1	–	–	1	1	–	–	–	–
(Northern Ireland)	Sammy McMillan	21+2	–	16+2	–	–	–	–	–	5	–
(Scotland)	Andy Provan	56	10	45	6	6	1	1	–	4	3
(Wales)	Cliff Sear	12+1	–	10+1	–	1	–	1	–	–	–
(England)	Alan Spence	9+4	3	5+4	2	2	–	–	–	2	1
(England)	Steve Stacey	1	–	1	–	–	–	–	–	–	–
(England)	Mike Sutton	58	2	46	2	6	–	1	–	5	–
(England)	Alan Tarbuck	25	10	17	6	4	3	–	–	4	1
(England)	Graham Turner	48+3	2	36+3	1	5	–	1	–	6	1
(Wales)	Keith Webber	41+5	8	31+4	4	6	2	0+1	–	4	2
	Own goals	–	3	–	3	–	–	–	–	–	–
	Total	59	85	46	58	6	11	1	1	6	15
