= Frank Adams (footballer) =

English footballer

Personal information
- Full name: Francis Nicholas Adams
- Date of birth: 8 February 1933
- Place of birth: Liverpool, England
- Date of death: 25 March 2009 (aged 76)
- Place of death: Huyton, England
- Position: Goalkeeper

Senior career*
Years	Team	Apps	(Gls)
–1955	Bury Amateurs		
1955–1963	Bury	169	(0)
1963–1964	Chester	9	(0)
1964	Tranmere Rovers	0	(0)
- * Club domestic league appearances and goals

Francis Adams (8 February 1933 – 25 March 2009) was an English footballer who played as a goalkeeper in the Football League for Bury and Chester.

== Playing career ==
Adams, born in Liverpool, Lancashire, was to spend most of his professional career with Bury, who he joined from local side Bury Amateurs. Between 1955 and 1963 he made 169 appearances in the Football League for the club. He missed only three games in Bury's Third Division championship season of 1960–61, the most successful in the club's history in terms of goals scored and points gained.

In the summer of 1963 he joined Chester, in a busy summer which saw other players including Stan Bennion, George Evans, John Currie, Jimmy Humes and Gil Wheaton also arrive at the club. Five years earlier Adams had been involved in controversy when playing for Bury against Chester in the FA Cup second round. With Chester leading 1–0 in the closing minutes, their player Norman Bullock was brought down in the area with play stopping with the linesman flagging for a penalty. But Adams picked up the ball and punted it forward and, with the ref deciding to play on, set up a late equaliser for Bury, who went on to earn an attractive tie with Arsenal in the third round after beating Chester in the replay.

His stint playing for Chester was not so memorable, as he lost his place to Dennis Reeves after eight league games and moved on to Tranmere Rovers, where he did not make any league appearances.

He died in 2009 at the age of 76.

== Bibliography ==
- Sumner, Chas (1997). On the Borderline: The Official History of Chester City F.C. 1885-1997. Yore Publications. ISBN 978-1-874427-52-0.
