= Colin Corbishley =

English footballer

Personal information
- Full name: Colin Corbishley
- Date of birth: 13 June 1939
- Place of birth: Stoke-on-Trent, England
- Date of death: 28 May 2015 (aged 75)
- Place of death: Halton, Cheshire, England
- Position: Midfielder

Senior career*
Years	Team	Apps	(Gls)
1959–1962	Port Vale	11	(0)
1962–1965	Chester	83	(11)
- Stafford Rangers
- Prescot Town
Total		94+	(11+)
- * Club domestic league appearances and goals

Colin Corbishley (13 June 1939 – 28 May 2015) was an English footballer who played as a midfielder for Port Vale, Chester, Stafford Rangers, and Prescot Town.

== Career ==
Corbishley joined Port Vale as an amateur in June 1959 and signed as a professional in October. He made his debut on 17 October 1960, in a League Cup 2–2 draw with Queens Park Rangers at Loftus Road. He played a further two League Cup and three Third Division matches that season. Used as a rotation player by manager Norman Low, he featured only in eight of the last nine games of the 1961–62 season before being released from Vale Park in May 1962. He moved on to Bill Lambton's Chester and scored 11 goals in 83 Fourth Division games as the "Seals" finished in the re-election zone in 1962–63 before rising to 12th and eighth place in 1963–64 and 1964–65 under new manager Peter Hauser. After leaving Sealand Road, Corbishley played for Stafford Rangers and Prescot Town.

== Career statistics ==
Appearances and goals by club, season and competition
Club	Season	League			FA Cup		League Cup		Total	
Club	Season	Division	Apps	Goals	Apps	Goals	Apps	Goals	Apps	Goals
Port Vale	1960–61	Third Division	3	0	0	0	3	0	6	0
Port Vale	1961–62	Third Division	8	0	0	0	0	0	8	0
Port Vale	Total		11	0	0	0	3	0	14	0
Chester	1962–63	Fourth Division	34	3	1	0	3	0	38	3
Chester	1963–64	Fourth Division	41	7	2	0	1	1	44	8
Chester	1964–65	Fourth Division	8	1	0	0	1	0	9	1
Chester	Total		83	11	3	0	5	1	91	12
Career total			94	11	3	0	8	1	105	12
