= Keith Edwards =

Keith Edwards may refer to:

- Keith Edwards (cricketer) (born 1951), former English cricketer
- Keith Edwards (footballer, born 1944), football player for Chester City
- Keith Edwards (footballer, born 1957), English football player
- Keith Edwards (media personality), American political strategist and media personality
- Keith Edwards (rugby league) (born 1947), Australian rugby league footballer
- W. Keith Edwards, American computer scientist
