= Billy Molyneux =

English footballer

Personal information
- Full name: William Stanley Molyneux
- Date of birth: 10 January 1944 (age 82)
- Place of birth: Ormskirk, England
- Position: Goalkeeper

Senior career*
Years	Team	Apps	(Gls)
1964–1965	Liverpool	1	(0)
1968–1969	Oldham Athletic	8	(0)
1969–1970	Wigan Athletic	2	(0)
Total		11	(0)
- * Club domestic league appearances and goals

William Stanley Molyneux (born 10 January 1944 in Ormskirk, Lancashire, England), is an English footballer who played as a goalkeeper in the Football League for Liverpool and Oldham Athletic. He also played for Northern Premier League side Wigan Athletic, appearing twice in the 1969–70 season.
