= Tommy Lang (footballer, born 1906) =

Scottish footballer

Personal information
- Date of birth: 3 April 1906
- Place of birth: Larkhall, South Lanarkshire, Scotland
- Position: Forward

Senior career*
Years	Team	Apps	(Gls)
- Larkhall Thistle
1926–1934	Newcastle United	215	(53)
1934–1935	Huddersfield Town	24	(5)
1935–1937	Manchester United	12	(1)
1937–1938	Swansea Town	33	(1)
1938–1946	Queen of the South	?	(?)
1946–1947	Ipswich Town	5	(1)
- * Club domestic league appearances and goals

Thomas Lang (3 April 1906, date of death unknown) was a Scottish footballer who played for Newcastle United, Huddersfield Town, Manchester United, Swansea City and Queen of the South. He was born in Larkhall, South Lanarkshire, Scotland.

It is perhaps at Newcastle United that Lang is best known, having helped them to victory in the 1932 FA Cup Final victory over Arsenal. Lang scored one and created the other in the 2–1 victory over Chelsea in the semi-final. Lang left Newcastle for Huddersfield Town in 1934, playing there for a year before joining Manchester United in 1935. In two years with Manchester United, Lang played just 12 times, scoring once.

Lang joined Swansea Town in April 1937. He then joined Queen of the South in the summer of 1938 as one of the first signings of new manager Jimmy McKinnell Sr. 1938-39 was the first time Queens hit top spot in the Scottish Football league. Queens finished that season sixth in Scotland's top division, a feat since equalled only in 1955–56. Lang equal top scored that season with 16 goals.

After the Second World War, Lang signed for Ipswich Town. He played for Ipswich for one season, scoring one goal in five league appearances, before becoming the club's trainer.

His son Gavin was also a footballer, who played for Chester City in the 1950s.

== Honours ==
Newcastle United

- FA Cup: 1931–32
