= John Currie (footballer, born 1939) =

Scottish footballer (1939–2025)

Personal information
- Full name: John Gemmell Currie
- Date of birth: 7 April 1939
- Place of birth: Dumfries, Scotland
- Date of death: 30 December 2025 (aged 86)
- Place of death: Llandudno, Wales
- Position: Wing half

Youth career
- 1957–1961: Leicester City

Senior career*
Years	Team	Apps	(Gls)
1961–1963	Workington	55	(2)
1963–1964	Chester	2	(0)
- Rhyl
Total		57	(2)
- * Club domestic league appearances and goals

John Gemmell Currie (7 April 1939 – 30 December 2025) was a Scottish footballer who played as a wing half in the Football League for Workington and Chester. He later moved to North Wales and was player-manager of Rhyl.
