= Gordon Seaton =

Scottish footballer

Personal information
- Full name: Gordon Seaton
- Date of birth: 1 September 1945 (age 81)
- Place of birth: Wick, Scotland
- Position: Midfielder

Youth career
- 1963–1964: Hibernian

Senior career*
Years	Team	Apps	(Gls)
1964–1965	Berwick Rangers	25	(0)
1965–1966	Rhyl		
1966–1968	Chester	49	(2)
- Runcorn
Total		74	(2)
- * Club domestic league appearances and goals

Gordon Seaton (born 1 September 1945) is a footballer who played as a midfielder in the Football League for Chester.
