= Dave Berry (footballer) =

English footballer (born 1945)

Personal information
- Full name: David Gilbert Berry
- Date of birth: 1 June 1945 (age 81)
- Place of birth: Newton-le-Willows, England
- Position: Defender

Youth career
- 1961–1963: Blackpool

Senior career*
Years	Team	Apps	(Gls)
1963–1964	Blackpool	0	(0)
1964–1967	Chester	1	(0)
1967–1972	Macclesfield Town	161	(8)
- * Club domestic league appearances and goals

David Berry (born 1 June 1945) is an English former footballer.

Berry began his playing career with Blackpool but moved to Chester in July 1964 having not made any league appearances for the Seasiders. His first season at Chester yielded just one first-team outing against Wrexham in the Welsh Cup, and he had to wait until 18 March 1967 for his only appearance in The Football League. He came on a substitute for Elfed Morris during Chester's 1–0 loss at Luton Town.

Berry later dropped into Non-League football with Macclesfield Town.

== Bibliography ==
- Sumner, Chas (1997). On the Borderline: The Official History of Chester City F.C. 1885-1997. Yore Publications. ISBN 978-1-874427-52-0.
