= Terry Bradbury =

English footballer (born 1939)

Personal information
- Full name: Terence Eugene Bradbury
- Date of birth: 15 November 1939 (age 86)
- Place of birth: Paddington, London, England
- Position: Wing half

Youth career
- 1955–1957: Chelsea

Senior career*
Years	Team	Apps	(Gls)
1957–1962	Chelsea	29	(1)
1962–1966	Southend United	161	(9)
1966–1967	Leyton Orient	27	(0)
1967–1969	Wrexham	78	(3)
1969–1971	Chester	90	(2)
1971–1972	Weymouth		
1972–1973	Northwich Victoria		
Total		385	(15)

International career
- England Schoolboys

Managerial career
- 1972–1973: Northwich Victoria
- * Club domestic league appearances and goals

Terence Eugene Bradbury (born 15 November 1939) is an English former professional footballer who played as a wing half.

== Playing career ==
Bradbury began his career with Chelsea, being capped by England Schoolboys on four occasions. He went on to make 29 appearances in the Football League First Division for Chelsea before leaving for Southend United in September 1962, for about £6,000, after falling out with manager Tommy Docherty.

After four years of regular football at Roots Hall, Bradbury switched to Leyton Orient for 1966–67 and then moved to Wrexham in the summer of 1967. Bradbury was sent off on his league debut against Luton Town but went on to establish himself as a favourite with Wrexham fans. In 1969, he joined local rivals Chester, combining his playing duties with working as a coach. After leaving Chester in 1971, Bradbury worked as a player-coach at Weymouth and followed it up with a short-spell as player-manager at Northwich Victoria.

== Personal life ==
Away from football, Bradbury has worked in the licensing trade, being based in Derbyshire. In July 2015 Bradbury won a prize of £5.5m on the National Lottery.
