= Gavin Lang =

Scottish footballer

Personal information
- Date of birth: 21 March 1926
- Place of birth: Larkhall, Scotland
- Date of death: 19 February 1989 (aged 62)
- Place of death: Wrexham, Wales
- Position: Winger

Youth career
- Burnbank Athletic
- 1943–1946: Partick Thistle

Senior career*
Years	Team	Apps	(Gls)
1946–1948	Partick Thistle		
1948–1950	Arbroath	41	(12)
- Hereford United
- Spalding United
1956–1957	Chester	3	(0)
Total		44	(12)
- * Club domestic league appearances and goals

Gavin Lang (21 March 1926 – 19 February 1989) was a Scottish footballer who played as a winger in the Football League for Chester. His father Tommy was also a footballer whose longest spell was with Newcastle United in the 1930s.
