= Alan Hignett =

English footballer

Personal information
- Full name: Alan James Hignett
- Date of birth: 1 November 1946 (age 79)
- Place of birth: Liverpool, England
- Position: Full back

Youth career
- 1962–1963: Liverpool

Senior career*
Years	Team	Apps	(Gls)
1963–1966	Liverpool	1	(0)
1966–1967	Chester	6	(0)

International career
- England Schoolboys
- * Club domestic league appearances and goals

Alan Hignett (born 1 November 1946) is an English former professional footballer who played as a full back in The Football League with Liverpool and Chester.

== Playing career ==
Hignett progressed through the youth ranks with Liverpool, signing a professional contract in November 1963. He also represented England Schoolboys during his early years at the club.

His solitary first-team appearance for the Reds came in the final league game of the 1964–65 season, helping Liverpool to a 3–1 First Division victory at Wolverhampton Wanderers.

Hignett remained at Anfield the following season without adding to his appearance tally. In August 1966 he became the third Liverpool player – after John Bennett and John Sealey – to make a summer free transfer switch to Chester. He made his debut on 10 September 1966 in a 3–0 defeat by Crewe Alexandra and played in six successive games in the number three shirt. The last of these was a 3–1 loss to Wrexham on 8 October 1966.

This was to be his last professional appearance in England as Hignett moved to Australia and played football for several years in New South Wales.
