= Alan Spence (footballer) =

English footballer

Personal information
- Full name: Alan Spence
- Date of birth: 7 February 1940 (age 86)
- Place of birth: Seaham, England
- Position: Inside forward

Senior career*
Years	Team	Apps	(Gls)
1957–1958	Sunderland	5	(1)
1960–1962	Darlington	24	(10)
1962–1968	Southport	230	(98)
1968–1969	Oldham Athletic	27	(12)
1969–1970	Chester	9	(2)
Total		295	(123)
- * Club domestic league appearances and goals

Alan Spence (born 7 February 1940), is an English footballer who played as an inside forward in the Football League.
