= Mike Sutton (footballer) =

English footballer (1944–2020)

Personal information
- Full name: Michael John Sutton
- Date of birth: 5 October 1944
- Place of birth: Norwich, England
- Date of death: 26 December 2020 (aged 76)
- Position: Midfielder

Youth career
- 1960–1962: Norwich City

Senior career*
| Years | Team | Apps | (Gls) |
| 1962–1967 | Norwich City | 51 | (3) |
| 1967–1970 | Chester | 138 | (9) |
| 1970–1972 | Carlisle United | 53 | (1) |
| c.1976–1984 | Great Yarmouth Town | | |
- * Club domestic league appearances and goals

Michael John Sutton (5 October 1944 – 26 December 2020) was an English professional footballer who played as a midfielder in the Football League for three clubs. Two of his sons, Chris and John, have also played professionally.

== Playing career ==
Sutton began his career in his home city of Norwich with Norwich City, with whom he turned professional in September 1962. He made more than 50 league appearances over the next five years and then joined Chester. This followed successful efforts by Chester manager Peter Hauser to persuade a disillusioned Sutton not to go ahead with his plans to quit football. Sutton played in all league games over the next three seasons (including one substitute appearance) before moving to Carlisle United for £10,000 at a time when Chester were in financial difficulties.

Unfortunately, Sutton was forced to retire from playing professional football two years later due to injury. Sutton then spent four years studying physical education and biology at Loughborough University and became a teacher at Hellesdon High School, in Norwich. He returned to football by playing for Great Yarmouth Town for eight years and became involved in coaching youngsters at Norwich City.

Sutton was also actively involved with Drayton Cricket Club for many years, including a spell as club chairman from 2003 to 2005.

== Death ==
Sutton died on 26 December 2020, aged 76. He had suffered from dementia for the past decade. His son Chris Sutton had spoken about his father's condition as part of a campaign to persuade football authorities to do more to protect players from the effects of repeated heading of the ball.
