= Les Harley =

English footballer

Personal information
- Full name: Leslie Harley
- Date of birth: 26 September 1946 (age 80)
- Place of birth: Chester, England
- Position: Winger

Youth career
- 1962–1964: Chester

Senior career*
| Years | Team | Apps | (Gls) |
| 1964–1967 | Chester | 25 | (3) |
| 1967–1968 | Blackpool | 0 | (0) |
| 1968 | → Rochdale (loan) | 5 | (0) |
- * Club domestic league appearances and goals

Leslie Harley (born 26 September 1946) is an English former professional footballer who played as a winger. He made appearances in the Football League for Chester and Rochdale.

== Playing career ==
Harley progressed through the youth ranks at his hometown club of Chester to make his professional debut on his 18th birthday in September 1964, in a 3–1 win against Brighton & Hove Albion. Over the next three years he had spells in and out of the side and featured in the two legs and replay against Swansea Town to decide the Welsh Cup final in 1966. In the replay he crossed for Les Jones to give Chester the lead at Sealand Road, but Swansea fought back to win 2–1 and keep the cup in Wales.

At the end of 1966–67, Harley moved to Blackpool but his only further league appearances came in a loan spell with Rochdale in a loan spell from February 1968.

Harley was one of three members of his family to make league appearances for Chester. His brother Albert played for the club towards the end of his career in 1969–70 and his nephew Lee appeared as a substitute on the opening day of the 1985–86 season against Halifax Town.

== Honours ==
Chester

- Welsh Cup runners–up: 1965–66.

== Bibliography ==
- Sumner, Chas (1997). On the Borderline: The Official History of Chester City F.C. 1885-1997. Yore Publications. ISBN 978-1-874427-52-0.
