= John Coates (footballer) =

English footballer

Personal information
- Date of birth: 3 June 1944 (age 82)
- Place of birth: Birkdale, England
- Position: Goalkeeper

Youth career
- Burscough

Senior career*
Years	Team	Apps	(Gls)
1964–1965	Southport	5	(0)
1966–1967	Chester	1	(0)
- Burscough
- Kirkby Town
1972–1975	Morecambe		
1975–1976	Skelmersdale United		
1976	Burscough		
1976–1977	Southport	16	(0)
- Morecambe
Total		22	(0)
- * Club domestic league appearances and goals

John Coates is a footballer who played as a goalkeeper in the Football League for Southport and Chester.
