= Brian Bades =

English footballer

Personal information
- Full name: Brian Lawrence Bades
- Date of birth: 3 July 1939 (age 87)
- Place of birth: Farnworth, England
- Position: Winger

Senior career*
Years	Team	Apps	(Gls)
1961–1962	Accrington Stanley	X	(X)
1962–1963	Horwich RMI		
1963–1964	Chester	15	(1)
- Runcorn
Total		15	(1)
- * Club domestic league appearances and goals

Brian Bades (born 3 July 1939) is an English former footballer, who played as a winger in the Football League for Chester. He also played in the league for Accrington Stanley, but their results and player appearances were expunged due to the club failing to complete their scheduled fixtures in the 1961–62 season.
