= Alan Caughter =

Welsh footballer

Personal information
- Full name: Alan David Caughter
- Date of birth: 19 February 1946 (age 80)
- Place of birth: Bangor, Wales
- Position: Full back

Senior career*
Years	Team	Apps	(Gls)
1969–1970	Chester	2	(0)
- * Club domestic league appearances and goals

Alan David Caughter (born 19 February 1946) is a Welsh footballer, who played as a full back in the Football League for Chester.
