= John Sealey =

English footballer (born 1945)

Personal information
- Full name: Arthur John Sealey
- Date of birth: 27 December 1945 (age 80)
- Place of birth: Wallasey, England
- Position: Winger

Youth career
- 1961–1963: Warrington Town

Senior career*
Years	Team	Apps	(Gls)
1963–1966	Liverpool	1	(1)
1966–1968	Chester	4	(0)
1968–1969	Wigan Athletic	22	(0)
- * Club domestic league appearances and goals

John Sealey (born 27 December 1945) is an English former professional footballer who played as a winger in The Football League for Liverpool and Chester.

== Playing career ==
Sealey began his career playing as an amateur for non-league side Warrington Town, before he moved to Liverpool in 1963 for a fee of £25. His solitary appearance came in Liverpool's final game of the 1964–65 season. He scored in Liverpool's 3–1 win at Wolverhampton Wanderers in Division One but was not selected again.

In June 1966, Sealey, John Bennett and Alan Hignett all moved from Liverpool to Chester on free transfers. Sealey made his debut in the second league game of the season, a 3–0 home defeat by Bradford Park Avenue and played in the following two games. Sealey's only other first-team games for Chester were not until January 1968, when he made substitute appearances in a Welsh Cup tie against Bangor City and a Division Four match at Exeter City.

This marked the end of his Chester playing career and he joined Wigan Athletic, where he made 22 league appearances. He later moved on to Winsford United and, in November 1969, to Nantwich Town. Sealey had to retire from football due to a serious knee injury from which he never recovered.
