= Eric Brodie =

Scottish footballer

Personal information
- Full name: Eric Brodie
- Date of birth: 8 November 1940 (age 85)
- Place of birth: Rattray, Scotland
- Position: Wing half

Senior career*
Years	Team	Apps	(Gls)
1957–1961	Forfar Athletic	111	(31)
1961–1963	Dundee United	18	(4)
1963–1968	Shrewsbury Town	185	(24)
1968–1969	Chester	43	(4)
1969–1972	Tranmere Rovers	83	(4)
- Bangor City
Total		440	(67)
- * Club domestic league appearances and goals

Eric Brodie (born 8 November 1940) is a Scottish former footballer who played as a wing half.

After playing in the Scottish League for Forfar Athletic and Dundee United, Brodie moved south in June 1963 when he joined Shrewsbury Town. Later, he also became briefly involved with Chester and Tranmere Rovers.

He also played for Mossley, signing on for the 1973–74 season in the Northern Premier League.
