= Graham Birks =

English footballer

Personal information
- Date of birth: 25 January 1942 (age 84)
- Place of birth: Sheffield, England
- Position: Full back

Youth career
- 1958–1960: Sheffield Wednesday

Senior career*
Years	Team	Apps	(Gls)
1960–1964	Sheffield Wednesday	4	(0)
1964–1966	Peterborough United	34	(0)
1966–1969	Southend United	140	(1)
1969–1972	Chester	73	(0)
1972–?	Port Elizabeth City		
- Fleetwood Town
- * Club domestic league appearances and goals

Graham Birks (born 25 January 1942) is an English former footballer who played as a full back.

== Playing career ==
Birks progressed through the youth ranks to make four appearances in the Football League First Division for Sheffield Wednesday. He moved to Peterborough United in 1964 and then played more than 100 league games for Southend United.

Early in 1969–70, Birks signed for Chester. He remained at Sealand Road until 1972, when he joined South African side Port Elizabeth City. He later returned to England and played for Fleetwood Town.
