= Gil Wheaton =

English footballer

Personal information
- Full name: Gilbert John Wheaton
- Date of birth: 1 November 1941 (age 85)
- Place of birth: Mickley, England
- Position: Centre half

Youth career
- Mickley Colliery

Senior career*
Years	Team	Apps	(Gls)
1962–1963	Grimsby Town	7	(0)
1963–1964	Chester	1	(0)
- Rhyl
Total		8	(0)
- * Club domestic league appearances and goals

Gil Wheaton (born 1 November 1941) is an English footballer, who played as a centre half in the Football League for Grimsby Town and Chester.
