= Steve Stacey (footballer) =

English footballer

Personal information
- Full name: Stephen Darrow Stacey
- Date of birth: 27 August 1944 (age 82)
- Place of birth: Bristol, England
- Position: Full back

Senior career*
Years	Team	Apps	(Gls)
1961–1966	Bristol City	0	(0)
1966–1969	Wrexham	105	(6)
1969–1970	Ipswich Town	3	(0)
1969	→ Chester (loan)	1	(0)
1970	→ Charlton Athletic (loan)	1	(1)
1970–1971	Bristol City	9	(0)
1971–1973	Exeter City	59	(0)
1973–1974	Bath City		
1974–19??	Floreat Athena		
- Rockingham City
- * Club domestic league appearances and goals

Stephen Darrow Stacey (born 27 August 1944) is an English former footballer who played as a full back in the Football League with Bristol City, Wrexham, Ipswich Town and Exeter City. He was the first footballer of African American heritage to play professionally in the United Kingdom. Stacey was the first Black player to play in the Football League for three of his clubs: Charlton Athletic (debut 7 February 1970); Ipswich Town (debut, 14 September 1968); and Exeter City (debut 14 August 1971).

== Personal life ==
Stacey is from a biracial background. He was brought up in Bristol by his mother, a white Englishwoman, after his father (who was a black American G.I.) returned home to the US after World War II.

In 1974, he emigrated to Western Australia, where he spent four seasons in the first division with Floreat Athena and Rockingham City.

He was appointed by the Western Australian State Government to chair a committee to establish 'The Future Direction of Football in Western Australia.'

He has written a book 'The Colour of Football' exploring his life as the first African American to play professional football in the UK.
