= Garth Lee =

English footballer

Personal information
- Full name: Garth Lee
- Date of birth: 30 September 1943 (age 83)
- Place of birth: Sheffield, England
- Position: Winger

Senior career*
Years	Team	Apps	(Gls)
1963–1965	Chester	28	(7)
- * Club domestic league appearances and goals

Garth Lee (born 30 September 1943) is an English footballer, who played as a winger in the Football League for Chester.
