= Albert Harley =

English footballer

Personal information
- Full name: Albert George Harley
- Date of birth: 17 April 1940
- Place of birth: Chester, England
- Date of death: June 1993
- Place of death: Chester, England
- Position: Wing half

Senior career*
Years	Team	Apps	(Gls)
1956–1965	Shrewsbury Town	220	(14)
1965–1966	Swansea Town	26	(0)
1966–1967	Crewe Alexandra	22	(4)
1967–1969	Stockport County	80	(11)
1969–1970	Chester	3	(1)
–	Connah's Quay Nomads		
Total		351	(30)
- * Club domestic league appearances and goals

Albert George Harley (17 April 1940 – June 1993) was an English footballer who played as a wing half in the Football League for Shrewsbury Town, Swansea Town, Crewe Alexandra, Stockport County and Chester.

Harley died of motor neurone disease in June 1993 aged 53.
