= Graham Chadwick (footballer) =

English footballer

Personal information
- Date of birth: 8 April 1942 (age 84)
- Place of birth: Oldham, England
- Position: Wing half

Youth career
- 1958–1962: Manchester City

Senior career*
| Years | Team | Apps | (Gls) |
| 1962–1964 | Manchester City | 12 | (0) |
| 1964–1965 | Walsall | 9 | (0) |
| 1965–1967 | Chester | 12 | (0) |
- * Club domestic league appearances and goals

Graham Chadwick (born 8 April 1942) is an English former footballer who played as a wing half for three clubs in The Football League.

Chadwick began his career with Manchester City, progressing from the youth set-up to make 12 league appearances before leaving for Walsall in 1964. After a year with the Saddlers, Chadwick moved to Chester, where 12 league outings were enjoyed before dropping into Non-league football with New Brighton. Captained Stafford Rangers to a treble of Northern Premier League, FA Trophy and Staffordshire Senior Cup in 1971/72 before joining Nantwich in the summer of 1974.
