= Tommy Singleton =

English footballer

Personal information
- Full name: Thomas William Singleton
- Date of birth: 8 September 1940
- Place of birth: Blackpool, England
- Date of death: 29 December 2005 (aged 65)
- Place of death: Blackpool, England
- Position: Full back

Youth career
- 1958–1962: Blackpool

Senior career*
Years	Team	Apps	(Gls)
1962–1965	Peterborough United	85	(1)
1965–1968	Chester	88	(1)
1968–1969	Bradford Park Avenue	32	(1)
- Fleetwood Town
Total		205	(3)
- * Club domestic league appearances and goals

Thomas Singleton was an English footballer, who played as a full back in the Football League for Peterborough United, Chester and Bradford Park Avenue.

Singleton began his career with Blackpool. He made only one appearance for the Seasiders, then under the leadership of Ron Suart, and it was in their League Cup Second Round replay extra-time defeat to Leeds United at Bloomfield Road on 5 October 1960.
