= Fred Willder =

English footballer

Personal information
- Full name: Frederick Willder
- Date of birth: 20 March 1944 (age 82)
- Place of birth: Lytham St Annes, England
- Position: Inside forward

Senior career*
Years	Team	Apps	(Gls)
1963–1966	Chester	4	(0)
1966–1971	Fleetwood	248	(32)
1971–19??	Wigan Athletic		
- * Club domestic league appearances and goals

Frederick Willder (born 20 March 1944) is an English footballer who played as an inside forward in the Football League for Chester. He then enjoyed a long career at Northern Premier League club Fleetwood F.C. before moving to Wigan Athletic in 1971.
