= John Bennett (footballer, born 1946) =

English footballer

Personal information
- Full name: John Graham Bennett
- Date of birth: 21 March 1946 (age 80)
- Place of birth: Liverpool, England
- Position: Full back

Youth career
- 1961–1963: Liverpool

Senior career*
| Years | Team | Apps | (Gls) |
| 1963–1966 | Liverpool | 0 | (0) |
| 1966–1969 | Chester | 76 | (0) |
| 1969–? | Macclesfield Town | | |
- * Club domestic league appearances and goals

John Bennett (born 21 March 1946) was an English professional footballer who played as a full back. He made 76 Football League appearances.

== Playing career ==
Bennett began his career with hometown club Liverpool, who he served his apprenticeship with before signing professional forms in April 1963. However, he failed to make a league appearance over the next three years and left for Division Four side Chester in June 1966. This was as part of a triple transfer deal that also saw Alan Hignett and John Sealey move from Anfield to Sealand Road for free. Bennett made 36 league appearances in 1966–67, initially playing in the number six shirt before becoming the club's regular full-back later in the campaign.

The following two seasons saw him make 23 and 13 appearances respectively. He failed to score any league goals for the club but did score twice in a Welsh Cup victory over Brymbo Steelworks in the 1967–68 Welsh Cup quarter-finals. He played his final game for the club in a 4–2 defeat by York City on 28 April 1969, as he was allowed to leave the club in the summer. This marked the end of his professional career and he joined non–league side Macclesfield Town. In May 1970 Bennett played at Wembley Stadium in the first final of the FA Trophy, helping Macclesfield beat Telford United 2–0. They completed a league and cup double by winning the Northern Premier League the following week.

== Honours ==
Macclesfield Town

- FA Trophy winners: 1969–70
- Northern Premier League champions: 1969–70

== Bibliography ==
- Sumner, Chas (1997). On the Borderline: The Official History of Chester City F.C. 1885-1997. Yore Publications. ISBN 1-874427-52-6.
- Phythian, Graham (2001). Saga of the Silkmen: The History of Macclesfield Town F.C. Carnegie Publishing. ISBN 1-85936-087-4.
