= Bryn Jones (footballer, born 1939) =

Welsh footballer

Personal information
- Full name: Bryn Edward Jones
- Date of birth: 26 May 1939 (age 87)
- Place of birth: Bagillt, Flintshire, Wales
- Date of death: 21 January 2025 (aged 85)
- Place of death: Prestatyn, Wales
- Position: Full back

Senior career*
Years	Team	Apps	(Gls)
19??–1963	Holywell Town		
1963–1964	Watford	2	(0)
1964–1967	Chester	30	(0)
1967–19??	New Brighton		
- * Club domestic league appearances and goals

Bryn Jones (born 26 May 1939, in Bagillt, Flintshire) is a Welsh former professional footballer who played as a full back. He played in The Football League for Watford and Chester.

== Playing career ==
Jones (aka bb) played for non-league side Holywell Town until joining Division Three side Watford in January 1963. However, he made just two league appearances before he returned north by joining Chester in August 1964. He made his Chester debut during the same month in a 3–1 win at Bradford City but added just one more appearance during the season. The following campaign saw him emerging as a regular at left back, with namesake Ray Jones playing in the right back slot. Chester went into their home game against Aldershot on 1 January 1966 in second place in Division Four, but both Bryn and Ray suffered broken legs in the 3–2 victory. The pair missed the remainder of the season as Chester finished in seventh place.

Jones recovered to play 11 games the following season before dropping out of The Football League and joining New Brighton.
