= Bill Lambton =

English footballer (1914–1976)

Personal information
- Full name: William Ernest Lambton
- Date of birth: 2 December 1914
- Place of birth: Nottingham, England
- Date of death: 16 September 1976 (aged 61)
- Place of death: Nottingham, England
- Position: Goalkeeper

Senior career*
| Years | Team | Apps | (Gls) |
| ?–1935 | Basford North End | | |
| 1935-c.45 | Nottingham Forest | | |
| 1945–46 | Peterborough United | 1 | (0) |
| 1946 | Exeter City | | |
| 1946–47 | Doncaster Rovers | 3 | (0) |

Managerial career
- 1958–59: Leeds United
- 1959: Scunthorpe United
- 1962–63: Chester
- * Club domestic league appearances and goals

William Lambton (2 December 1914 – 16 September 1976) was an English football player and manager. He played in goal for Nottingham Forest, Exeter City and Doncaster Rovers, although he made just three Football League appearances in total with his playing days largely coinciding with the Second World War.

Lambton is better remembered for his spells in coaching and management. He worked as a coach in Denmark with KB Copenhagen and then with Scunthorpe United, Grimsby Town and Leeds United. In December 1958 he became Leeds manager. Despite signing Leeds legends Don Revie and Billy Bremner, he was asked to leave after just four months. This however was to be significantly longer than his next managerial post, as he was in charge of Scunthorpe for just three days in April 1959.

Lambton was appointed Chester manager in January 1962, two months after the sacking of Stan Pearson. Chester were enduring a miserable season that saw them finish bottom of the Football League. Greater things were expected the following season, but a poor run of just four wins in their last 18 games saw them finish fourth from bottom and forced to again apply for re-election to the league. Although Chester comfortably achieved enough votes to remain in the league, Lambton had his contract cancelled by mutual consent in July 1963.

A former Sergeant Major in the Army, Lambton was known as 'Iron Man Bill'. He died in Sherwood, Nottingham aged 61.
