= Keith Edwards (footballer, born 1944) =

English footballer

Personal information
- Full name: Keith Barry Edwards
- Date of birth: 10 June 1944 (age 82)
- Place of birth: Chester, England
- Position: Centre forward

Senior career*
| Years | Team | Apps | (Gls) |
| 1965–1967 | Chester | 3 | (0) |
- * Club domestic league appearances and goals

Keith Barry Edwards (born 10 June 1944) is an English footballer, who played as a centre forward in the Football League for Chester.
