= 1964–65 FA Cup =

Tournament details
- Country: England; Wales

Final positions
- Champions: Liverpool (1st title)
- Runners-up: Leeds United

Tournament statistics
- Top goal scorer(s): Hughie McIlmoyle; Derek Dougan (7 goals)

The 1964–65 FA Cup was the 84th staging of the world's oldest football cup competition, the Football Association Challenge Cup, commonly known as the FA Cup. Liverpool won the competition for the first time (despite having reached two finals previously), beating Leeds United 2–1 after extra time in the final at Wembley.

Matches were scheduled to be played at the stadium of the team named first on the date specified for each round, which was always a Saturday. Some matches, however, might be rescheduled for other days if there were clashes with games for other competitions or the weather was inclement. If scores were level after 90 minutes had been played, a replay would take place at the stadium of the second-named team later the same week. If the replayed match was drawn further replays would be held until a winner was determined. If scores were level after 90 minutes had been played in a replay, a 30-minute period of extra time would be played.

== Calendar ==
Round	Date
First qualifying round	Saturday 5 September 1964
Second qualifying round	Saturday 19 September 1964
Third qualifying round	Saturday 3 October 1964
Fourth qualifying round	Saturday 17 October 1964
First round proper	Saturday 14 November 1964
Second round	Saturday 5 December 1964
Third round	Saturday 9 January 1965
Fourth round	Saturday 30 January 1965
Fifth round	Saturday 20 February 1965
Sixth round	Saturday 6 March 1965
Semi-finals	Saturday 27 March 1965
Final	Saturday 1 May 1965

== Qualifying rounds ==
Most participating clubs that were not members of the Football League competed in the qualifying rounds to secure one of 30 places available in the first round.

The winners from the fourth qualifying round were South Shields, Annfield Plain, Kendal Town, Scarborough, Macclesfield Town, Wigan Athletic, Bangor City, South Liverpool, Hereford United, Kidderminster Harriers, Spalding United, Corby Town, Kettering Town, Wisbech Town, King's Lynn, Cambridge United, Dartford, Gravesend & Northfleet, Canterbury City, Romford, Chelmsford City, Hayes, Guildford City, Barnet, Hendon, Weymouth, Bideford, Salisbury, Bath City and Welton Rovers.

Those appearing in the competition proper for the first time were Canterbury City, Bideford and Welton Rovers. Of the others, Spalding United had last featured at this stage in 1957-58, Kidderminster Harriers in 1952-53, Hayes and South Liverpool in 1946-47, and Annfield Plain in 1928-29. Barnet participated in seven rounds of this season's competition, defeating Harlow Town, Hertford Town, Stevenage Town, Walthamstow Avenue, Cambridge United and Enfield before going out to the previous season's runner-up Preston North End in the third round.

== Results ==
=== First round proper ===
At this stage the 48 clubs from the Football League Third and Fourth Divisions joined the 30 non-league clubs who came through the qualifying rounds. The final two non-league clubs in this round, Crook Town and Enfield were given byes as the champions and runners-up from the previous season's FA Amateur Cup.

Matches were scheduled to be played on Saturday, 14 November 1964. Eight were drawn and went to replays three or four days later. Two of these replayed matches required a second replay to complete the fixture, with those games played the following week.

Tie no	Home team	Score	Away team	Date
1	Chester	5–0	Crewe Alexandra	14 November 1964
2	Chesterfield	2–0	South Shields	14 November 1964
3	Dartford	1–1	Aldershot	14 November 1964
Replay	Aldershot	1–0	Dartford	18 November 1964
4	Bournemouth & Boscombe Athletic	7–0	Gravesend & Northfleet	14 November 1964
5	Barnet	2–1	Cambridge United	14 November 1964
6	Barrow	1–1	Grimsby Town	14 November 1964
Replay	Grimsby Town	2–2	Barrow	17 November 1964
Replay	Barrow	0–2	Grimsby Town	23 November 1964
7	Bristol City	1–0	Brighton & Hove Albion	14 November 1964
8	Welton Rovers	1–1	Weymouth	14 November 1964
Replay	Weymouth	4–3	Welton Rovers	18 November 1964
9	Reading	3–1	Watford	14 November 1964
10	Walsall	0–2	Bristol Rovers	14 November 1964
11	Wisbech Town	0–2	Brentford	14 November 1964
12	Notts County	2–0	Chelmsford City	14 November 1964
13	Macclesfield Town	1–2	Wrexham	14 November 1964
14	Luton Town	1–0	Southend United	14 November 1964
15	Scarborough	1–0	Bradford City	14 November 1964
16	Tranmere Rovers	0–0	Lincoln City	14 November 1964
Replay	Lincoln City	1–0	Tranmere Rovers	18 November 1964
17	Stockport County	2–1	Wigan Athletic	14 November 1964
18	Kidderminster Harriers	1–4	Hull City	14 November 1964
19	Queens Park Rangers	2–0	Bath City	14 November 1964
20	Crook Town	1–0	Carlisle United	14 November 1964
21	King's Lynn	0–1	Shrewsbury Town	14 November 1964
22	Millwall	2–0	Kettering Town	14 November 1964
23	Oldham Athletic	4–0	Hereford United	14 November 1964
24	Bradford Park Avenue	2–3	Doncaster Rovers	14 November 1964
25	Exeter City	1–0	Hayes	14 November 1964
26	Scunthorpe United	1–2	Darlington	14 November 1964
27	Port Vale	2–1	Hendon	14 November 1964
28	Halifax Town	2–2	South Liverpool	14 November 1964
Replay	South Liverpool	4–2	Halifax Town	18 November 1964
29	Newport County	5–3	Spalding United	14 November 1964
30	Southport	6–1	Annfield Plain	14 November 1964
31	Workington	2–0	Rochdale	14 November 1964
32	York City	5–1	Bangor City	14 November 1964
33	Netherfield (Kendal)	1–3	Barnsley	14 November 1964
34	Guildford City	2–2	Gillingham	14 November 1964
Replay	Gillingham	1–0	Guildford City	18 November 1964
35	Romford	0–0	Enfield	14 November 1964
Replay	Enfield	0–0	Romford	17 November 1964
Replay	Romford	2–4	Enfield	23 November 1964
36	Peterborough United	5–1	Salisbury	14 November 1964
37	Colchester United	3–3	Bideford	14 November 1964
Replay	Bideford	1–2	Colchester United	18 November 1964
38	Canterbury City	0–6	Torquay United	14 November 1964
39	Corby Town	1–3	Hartlepools United	14 November 1964
40	Oxford United	0–1	Mansfield Town	14 November 1964

=== Second round ===
The matches were scheduled for Saturday, 5 December 1964. Five matches were drawn, with replays taking place later the same week. The Stockport County–Grimsby Town game was played midweek on 7 December, however.

Tie no	Home team	Score	Away team	Date
1	Enfield	4–4	Barnet	5 December 1964
Replay	Barnet	3–0	Enfield	8 December 1964
2	Chesterfield	2–1	York City	5 December 1964
3	Bournemouth & Boscombe Athletic	0–3	Bristol City	5 December 1964
4	Luton Town	1–0	Gillingham	5 December 1964
5	Doncaster Rovers	0–0	Scarborough	5 December 1964
Replay	Scarborough	1–2	Doncaster Rovers	9 December 1964
6	Wrexham	2–3	Southport	5 December 1964
7	Stockport County	1–0	Grimsby Town	7 December 1964
8	Queens Park Rangers	3–3	Peterborough United	5 December 1964
Replay	Peterborough United	2–1	Queens Park Rangers	9 December 1964
9	Barnsley	2–5	Chester	5 December 1964
10	Brentford	4–0	Notts County	5 December 1964
11	Crook Town	0–1	Oldham Athletic	5 December 1964
12	Bristol Rovers	4–1	Weymouth	5 December 1964
13	South Liverpool	0–2	Workington	5 December 1964
14	Millwall	4–0	Port Vale	5 December 1964
15	Hull City	1–1	Lincoln City	5 December 1964
Replay	Lincoln City	3–1	Hull City	9 December 1964
16	Exeter City	1–2	Shrewsbury Town	5 December 1964
17	Hartlepools United	0–0	Darlington	5 December 1964
Replay	Darlington	4–1	Hartlepools United	9 December 1964
18	Newport County	3–0	Mansfield Town	5 December 1964
19	Torquay United	2–0	Colchester United	5 December 1964
20	Aldershot	1–3	Reading	5 December 1964

=== Third round ===
The 44 First and Second Division clubs entered the competition at this stage. The matches were scheduled for Saturday, 9 January 1965. Ten matches were drawn and went to replays, though none of these then resulted in a second replay. Barnet was the last non-league club left in the competition.

Tie no	Home team	Score	Away team	Date
1	Chesterfield	0–3	Peterborough United	9 January 1965
2	Darlington	0–2	Arsenal	9 January 1965
3	Barnet	2–3	Preston North End	9 January 1965
4	Bristol City	1–1	Sheffield United	9 January 1965
Replay	Sheffield United	3–0	Bristol City	11 January 1965
5	Burnley	1–1	Brentford	9 January 1965
Replay	Brentford	0–2	Burnley	12 January 1965
6	Southampton	3–1	Leyton Orient	9 January 1965
7	Reading	2–2	Newport County	9 January 1965
Replay	Newport County	0–1	Reading	11 January 1965
8	Leicester City	2–2	Blackburn Rovers	9 January 1965
Replay	Blackburn Rovers	1–2	Leicester City	14 January 1965
9	Nottingham Forest	1–0	Norwich City	9 January 1965
10	Aston Villa	3–0	Coventry City	9 January 1965
11	Bolton Wanderers	4–1	Workington	9 January 1965
12	Middlesbrough	6–2	Oldham Athletic	9 January 1965
13	West Bromwich Albion	1–2	Liverpool	9 January 1965
14	Luton Town	0–3	Sunderland	9 January 1965
15	Everton	2–2	Sheffield Wednesday	9 January 1965
Replay	Sheffield Wednesday	0–3	Everton	13 January 1965
16	Swindon Town	1–2	Ipswich Town	9 January 1965
17	Doncaster Rovers	0–1	Huddersfield Town	9 January 1965
18	Manchester City	1–1	Shrewsbury Town	9 January 1965
Replay	Shrewsbury Town	3–1	Manchester City	13 January 1965
19	Fulham	3–3	Millwall	9 January 1965
Replay	Millwall	2–0	Fulham	11 January 1965
20	Bristol Rovers	0–0	Stockport County	9 January 1965
Replay	Stockport County	3–2	Bristol Rovers	11 January 1965
21	Portsmouth	0–0	Wolverhampton Wanderers	9 January 1965
Replay	Wolverhampton Wanderers	3–2	Portsmouth	12 January 1965
22	West Ham United	4–2	Birmingham City	9 January 1965
23	Manchester United	2–1	Chester	9 January 1965
24	Plymouth Argyle	4–2	Derby County	9 January 1965
25	Crystal Palace	5–1	Bury	9 January 1965
26	Chelsea	4–1	Northampton Town	9 January 1965
27	Cardiff City	1–2	Charlton Athletic	9 January 1965
28	Swansea Town	1–0	Newcastle United	9 January 1965
29	Leeds United	3–0	Southport	9 January 1965
30	Torquay United	3–3	Tottenham Hotspur	9 January 1965
Replay	Tottenham Hotspur	5–1	Torquay United	18 January 1965
31	Stoke City	4–1	Blackpool	11 January 1965
32	Rotherham United	5–1	Lincoln City	9 January 1965

=== Fourth round ===
The matches were scheduled for Saturday, 30 January 1965. Six matches were drawn and went to replays. The replays were all played two, three or four days later.

Tie no	Home team	Score	Away team	Date
1	Liverpool	1–1	Stockport County	30 January 1965
Replay	Stockport County	0–2	Liverpool	3 February 1965
2	Preston North End	1–2	Bolton Wanderers	30 January 1965
3	Southampton	1–2	Crystal Palace	30 January 1965
4	Reading	1–1	Burnley	30 January 1965
Replay	Burnley	1–0	Reading	2 February 1965
5	Leicester City	5–0	Plymouth Argyle	30 January 1965
6	Wolverhampton Wanderers	2–2	Rotherham United	30 January 1965
Replay	Rotherham United	0–3	Wolverhampton Wanderers	2 February 1965
7	Sunderland	1–3	Nottingham Forest	30 January 1965
8	Sheffield United	0–2	Aston Villa	30 January 1965
9	Tottenham Hotspur	5–0	Ipswich Town	30 January 1965
10	West Ham United	0–1	Chelsea	30 January 1965
11	Millwall	1–2	Shrewsbury Town	30 January 1965
12	Swansea Town	1–0	Huddersfield Town	30 January 1965
13	Charlton Athletic	1–1	Middlesbrough	30 January 1965
Replay	Middlesbrough	2–1	Charlton Athletic	1 February 1965
14	Leeds United	1–1	Everton	30 January 1965
Replay	Everton	1–2	Leeds United	2 February 1965
15	Stoke City	0–0	Manchester United	30 January 1965
Replay	Manchester United	1–0	Stoke City	3 February 1965
16	Peterborough United	2–1	Arsenal	30 January 1965

=== Fifth round ===
The matches were scheduled for Saturday, 20 February 1965. Two games required replays during the midweek fixture, and the Aston Villa & Wolverhampton Wanderers match went to a third game the following week, with Wolves the victors.

Tie no	Home team	Score	Away team	Date
1	Aston Villa	1–1	Wolverhampton Wanderers	20 February 1965
Replay	Wolverhampton Wanderers	0–0	Aston Villa	24 February 1965
Replay	Aston Villa	1–3	Wolverhampton Wanderers	1 March 1965
2	Bolton Wanderers	0–1	Liverpool	20 February 1965
3	Middlesbrough	0–3	Leicester City	20 February 1965
4	Manchester United	2–1	Burnley	20 February 1965
5	Crystal Palace	3–1	Nottingham Forest	20 February 1965
6	Chelsea	1–0	Tottenham Hotspur	20 February 1965
7	Leeds United	2–0	Shrewsbury Town	20 February 1965
8	Peterborough United	0–0	Swansea Town	20 February 1965
Replay	Swansea Town	0–2	Peterborough United	23 February 1965

=== Sixth round ===
The four quarter-final ties were scheduled to be played on Saturday, 6 March 1965. Two of these matches, however, were not played until Wednesday, 10 March. In addition, the Leicester City–Liverpool match went to a replay on this date. Peterborough United reached this stage for the first time in only their fifth season as a Football League club.

Tie no	Home team	Score	Away team	Date
1	Leicester City	0–0	Liverpool	6 March 1965
Replay	Liverpool	1–0	Leicester City	10 March 1965
2	Wolverhampton Wanderers	3–5	Manchester United	10 March 1965
3	Crystal Palace	0–3	Leeds United	10 March 1965
4	Chelsea	5–1	Peterborough United	6 March 1965

=== Semi-finals ===
The semi-final matches were played on Saturday, 27 March 1965. Leeds United and Liverpool came through the semi-final round to meet at Wembley.

27 March 1965
15:00

Liverpool	2–0	Chelsea
Thompson 63'; Stevenson (pen.)	Report

Villa Park, Birmingham
Referee: David Smith, Stonehouse
27 March 1965
15:00

Leeds United	0–0	Manchester United
	Report

Hillsborough, Sheffield
Attendance: 65,000
Referee: R. H. Windle, Chesterfield

Replay

31 March 1965
19:45

Manchester United	0–1	Leeds United
	Report	Bremner 89'

City Ground, Nottingham
Referee: R. H. Windle, Chesterfield

=== Final ===
The 1965 FA Cup final was contested by Liverpool and Leeds United at Wembley on Saturday 1 May 1965. The match finished 2–1 to Liverpool, with all three goals coming in extra time.

1 May 1965
15:00 BST

Liverpool	2 – 1 (a.e.t.)	Leeds United
Hunt 93'; St. John 112'		Bremner 102'

Wembley, London
Attendance: 100,000
Referee: W. Clements (Birmingham)

Liverpool	Leeds United
