= Malcolm Starkey =

English footballer

Personal information
- Full name: Malcolm John Starkey
- Date of birth: 25 January 1936 (age 90)
- Place of birth: Bulwell, England
- Positions: Inside forward; full back

Team information
- Current team: Shrewsbury Town (president)

Senior career*
Years	Team	Apps	(Gls)
1954–1959	Blackpool	3	(0)
1959–1963	Shrewsbury Town	121	(33)
1963–1967	Chester	109	(1)
- * Club domestic league appearances and goals

Malcolm Starkey (born 25 January 1936) is an English former professional footballer. He played in The Football League with Blackpool, Shrewsbury Town and Chester and later worked as secretary at Shrewsbury.

== Playing career ==
Starkey began his career at Blackpool as an inside forward, making three appearances before a move to Shrewsbury Town led to him playing regularly in attack alongside the prolific Arthur Rowley.

In April 1963, Starkey dropped into Football League Division Four with Chester, where he would soon be converted into a full back by new manager Peter Hauser. His spell at Chester would see him not miss a league game in 1964–65 but his career was to finish prematurely early in the 1966–67 season when he suffered a serious illness.

After retiring from playing, Starkey set up a sports shop in Shrewsbury with Dave Pountney and became a coach at his former club Shrewsbury Town. It was the start of a long stint with the club, which included long spells as both secretary and a director of the club. He was rewarded for his loyalty with a testimonial match between Shrewsbury and Aston Villa in May 2002.
