= Jimmy Humes =

English footballer

Personal information
- Full name: James Humes
- Date of birth: 6 August 1942 (age 84)
- Place of birth: Carlisle, England
- Position: Winger

Youth career
- 1957–1959: Preston North End

Senior career*
Years	Team	Apps	(Gls)
1959–1962	Preston North End	18	(1)
1962–1963	Bristol Rovers	2	(0)
1963–1967	Chester	124	(31)
1967–1968	Barnsley	7	(1)
1968–1969	Chorley		
- * Club domestic league appearances and goals

Jimmy Humes (born 6 August 1942) is an English former professional footballer who played as a winger. He played in The Football League for four clubs.

== Playing career ==
Humes began his career with Preston North End, making his debut aged 17 in a Division One match against Nottingham Forest. After a spell with Bristol Rovers, Humes joined Chester in July 1963.

He spent four years at Chester, with the most memorable season being 1964–65. Along with teammates Mike Metcalf, Elfed Morris, Hugh Ryden and Gary Talbot, Humes managed to score 20 first-team goals. This included a diving header to give Chester the lead at Manchester United in the FA Cup, although United recovered to win 2–1.

Humes moved to Barnsley in July 1967, where he ended his professional career with seven league appearances. After spending a year playing for non-league side Chorley, Humes retired from playing and went on to work for housing department for Carlisle City Council.

== Honours ==
Barnsley

- Division Four runners-up: 1967–68 (7 apps, 1 goal).
