= John Butler (footballer, born 1937) =

English footballer

Personal information
- Date of birth: 10 March 1937
- Place of birth: Birmingham, England
- Date of death: 2010 (aged 72–73)
- Position: Central defender

Youth career
- Bestwood Colliery

Senior career*
| Years | Team | Apps | (Gls) |
| 1958–1962 | Notts County | 109 | (0) |
| 1962–1968 | Chester | 222 | (0) |
| Total | | 331 | (0) |
- * Club domestic league appearances and goals

John Herbert Butler (1937 – 2010) was a footballer who played as a central defender in the Football League for Notts County and Chester. He was ever present when Notts County won promotion from Division Four in the 1959–60 season. Butler moved on a free transfer from Notts County to Chester in 1962.

Declined the opportunity to manage Nantwich on the club's return to the Cheshire County League in 1968 but signed as a player before injury forced him to retire early in the 1968/69 campaign.
