= Dennis Reeves =

Scottish footballer

Personal information
- Full name: Dennis John Richardson Reeves
- Date of birth: 1 December 1944 (age 81)
- Place of birth: Lochmaben, Scotland
- Position: Goalkeeper

Youth career
- 1961–1963: Chester

Senior career*
Years	Team	Apps	(Gls)
1963–1967	Chester	139	(0)
1967–1969	Wrexham	15	(0)
1969–1975	Wigan Athletic	233	(0)
- * Club domestic league appearances and goals

Dennis Reeves (born 1 December 1944) is a Scottish former footballer who played as a goalkeeper.

== Playing career ==
Although born in Scotland, Reeves spent his entire playing career in England and Wales. He was invited to trials at Chester in 1961, making his debut in The Football League for the club against Rochdale in October 1963. He was a regular in the side for the next three years. On 9 January 1965, he made a superb one-handed save at Old Trafford to deny Bobby Charlton in Chester's 2-1 defeat against Manchester United in the FA Cup third round.

Reeves asked Chester for a transfer after losing his place to Terry Carling during the 1966–67 season. In October 1967 he moved to local rivals Wrexham where he made 15 league appearances. In 1969 he began playing Non-League football with Wigan Athletic. Reeves felt he produced the best form of his career playing at Wigan's Springfield Park, which included the 1973 final of the FA Trophy at Wembley Stadium. He went on to make a total of 233 appearances for the Northern Premier League club.

Reeves announced his retirement at the end of the 1974–75 season. Back in Chester, he worked as a painter and decorator, and played club cricket.
