= Mike Metcalf =

English footballer

Personal information
- Full name: Michael Metcalf
- Date of birth: 24 May 1939
- Place of birth: Liverpool, England
- Date of death: 26 December 2018 (aged 79)
- Position: Striker

Youth career
- 1955–1957: Everton

Senior career*
Years	Team	Apps	(Gls)
1957–1963	Wrexham	121	(58)
1963–1969	Chester	221	(68)
1969–1970	Altrincham		
c.1970–1971	Bangor City		
c.1971–1973	Rhyl		
c.1973–1974	Connah's Quay Nomads		
c.1974–1975	Witton Albion		

Managerial career
- c.1973–1974: Connah's Quay Nomads
- c.1974–1975: Witton Albion
- * Club domestic league appearances and goals

Mike Metcalf (24 May 1939 – 26 December 2018) was an English professional footballer who made more than 300 appearances in The Football League for Wrexham and Chester.

Metcalf began his career with Everton, before joining Wrexham as a part-timer in May 1957 to allow him to complete a degree course in chemistry. Over the next six years he scored 58 times in 121 league games for Wrexham before switching to local rivals Chester for £5,000 in December 1963. The following season saw Chester score 141 in Fourth Division, FA Cup and Football League Cup matches, with Metcalf netting 37 of them. His fellow forwards Jimmy Humes, Elfed Morris, Hugh Ryden and Gary Talbot also all scored at least 20 goals during the campaign.

Between October 1964 and September 1967, Metcalf started a club record 127 consecutive league games. The record remained intact until March 2009, when it was broken by goalkeeper John Danby. Metcalf remained with Chester until the 1968–69 season, playing his final Football League game in a 2–0 defeat to Workington on 30 November 1968.

Over the following years, Metcalf had spells playing for Altrincham, Bangor City and Rhyl and then became player-manager at Connah's Quay Nomads and Witton Albion. Metcalf then ran his own chemical company, Metlab Supplies Ltd, and continued to play local football in the Chester area.

He is sometimes referred to as Mick Metcalf.

== Honours ==
Wrexham

- Football League Fourth Division promotion as third placed team: 1961–62

== Bibliography ==
- Sumner, Chas (1997). On the Borderline: The Official History of Chester City F.C. 1885–1997. Yore Publications. ISBN 978-1-874427-52-0.
