= David Read (footballer) =

English footballer

Personal information
- Full name: David Peter Read
- Date of birth: 15 January 1941 (age 85)
- Place of birth: Stafford, England
- Position: Winger

Senior career*
Years	Team	Apps	(Gls)
1962–1967	Chester	72	(6)
- * Club domestic league appearances and goals

David Peter Read (born 15 January 1941) is an English footballer, who played as a winger in the Football League for Chester.
