= Gary Talbot =

English footballer (1937–2019)

Personal information
- Date of birth: 15 December 1937
- Place of birth: Blackburn, Lancashire, England
- Date of death: 22 December 2019 (aged 82)
- Position: Striker

Senior career*
Years	Team	Apps	(Gls)
1963–67	Chester	111	(61)
1967–68	Crewe Alexandra	37	(20)
1968–69	Chester	43	(22)
1969–19??	Drumcondra		
- * Club domestic league appearances and goals

Gary Talbot (15 December 1937 – 22 December 2019) was a professional footballer in the 1960s with Chester, where he set a record as the second highest Football League goalscorer, and Crewe Alexandra. He also worked as a photographer.

== Playing career ==
Talbot was signed by new Chester manager Peter Hauser in September 1963 as a 25-year-old, after the press photographer was spotted playing in a charity match. Within days he made his Football League debut against Newport County, scoring in a 3–0 victory. He then netted twice as Chester drew 2–2 at Barrow and he was comfortably the club's top scorer with 23 league goals to his name by the end of the season.

The 1964–65 season saw Chester score 141 goals in Division Four, FA Cup and Football League Cup, with Talbot and fellow forwards Jimmy Humes, Mike Metcalf, Elfed Morris and Hugh Ryden all netting at least 20 goals. Talbot bagged 35 of them (28 in the league), including a hat-trick in two minutes and 57 seconds in the closing stages of an FA Cup 5-0 derby win over Crewe.

Injuries limited Talbot's appearances and goal tally over the next two seasons, and he was allowed to switch to Fourth Division rivals Crewe Alexandra in the summer of 1967. He netted 20 times in 37 league appearances before surprisingly returning to Chester in time for the 1968–69 campaign. Talbot once again broke the 20 goal barrier, with his tally of 22 leading him as the Division Four leading scorer.

Talbot then opted to retire from professional football, with his final game being a 2–0 win over Lincoln City in April 1969. This match also marked the debuts of Nigel Edwards and Grenville Millington, with the pair going on to play more than 500 league matches for Chester between them. Talbot left as Chester's record Football League goalscorer (previously held by Frank Wrightson) with 83 goals, and it was not until September 1992 that Stuart Rimmer would pass the total.

Talbot then had a spell playing for Irish side Drumcondra. He worked for many years as a photographer in the Chester where he had a photographic studio, From there he travelled the World photographing world leaders such as The President of Kenya, Presidents of Sierra Leone, The Gambia and Malaysia. He also Photographed members of The Royal Family including Princes Diana, singers and Film Stars. His Photographic work was Internationally renowned. He is survived by his wife and two children .

== Honours ==
with Crewe Alexandra

- Football League Fourth Division fourth-place promotion: 1967–68
