= Stan Bennion =

English footballer

Personal information
- Full name: Stanley Bennion
- Date of birth: 9 February 1938
- Place of birth: Blacon, Chester, England
- Date of death: 5 August 2013 (aged 75)
- Place of death: Llay, Wrexham, Wales
- Position: Winger

Youth career
- 1955–1959: Wrexham

Senior career*
Years	Team	Apps	(Gls)
1959–1963	Wrexham	54	(18)
1963–1965	Chester	20	(3)
1965–1970	New Brighton		
1970–1974	Rhyl		
- * Club domestic league appearances and goals

Stanley Bennion (9 February 1938 – 5 August 2013) was an English professional footballer. He played in the Football League as a winger for Wrexham and Chester.

== Playing career ==
Bennion progressed through Wrexham's youth setup and signed as a part-time professional with the club in September 1959. He went on to make more than 50 league appearances over the next four years but his opportunities became limited after the signing of Arfon Griffiths in 1962. The following season saw him agree to join Halifax Town, but the move collapsed and Stan joined Chester in time for the 1963–64 season as part of a swap deal with Bill Myerscough.

He made 20 league appearances in his first season with Chester but did not make any more the following season, although he did play in a Welsh Cup tie at Wrexham. He also scored both goals when captain of the Chester side that beat Tranmere Rovers 2–0 to win the Cheshire Bowl.

Bennion then dropped into non-league football, playing for New Brighton until 1970 and then spending four years with Rhyl. He continued to play local football in the Chester area into the 1990s. Outside football he has been employed by Cheshire County Council.

== Bibliography ==
- Sumner, Chas (1997). On the Borderline: The Official History of Chester City F.C. 1885-1997. Yore Publications. ISBN 1-874427-52-6.
