= Elfed Morris =

Welsh footballer

Personal information
- Full name: Elfed Morris
- Date of birth: 9 June 1942
- Place of birth: Colwyn Bay, Wales
- Date of death: 4 November 2013 (aged 71)
- Position: Winger

Youth career
- Colwyn Bay

Senior career*
Years	Team	Apps	(Gls)
1960–1962	Wrexham	9	(6)
1962–1968	Chester	167	(69)
1968	Halifax Town	9	(2)
- Caernarfon Town
- Bethesda Athletic
- Llandudno Borough
- Colwyn Bay

Managerial career
- Caernarfon Town
- Colwyn Bay
- * Club domestic league appearances and goals

Elfed Morris (9 June 1942 – 4 November 2013) was a Welsh professional footballer. He played in the English Football League for Wrexham, Chester and Halifax Town.

== Playing career ==
The nephew of former Wrexham manager Billy Morris, Elfed joined Wrexham in May 1960 after starting out with his hometown club of Colwyn Bay. Two years later he moved to local rivals Chester, where he was to spend the majority of his professional career.

Morris scored 69 league goals over the next six years, leaving him as the club's fourth highest Football League scorer in their history. 24 of them came in 1964–65, when Morris and fellow attackers Jimmy Humes, Mike Metcalf, Hugh Ryden and Gary Talbot all managed at least 20 goals each in league and English cup matches. Morris scored an identical tally the following season, amid rumours he would be leaving for a bigger club.

Morris ended his league career at Halifax Town, before spending time in non-league football with Caernarfon Town, Bethesda Athletic, Llandudno Borough and Colwyn Bay. He managed both Caernarfon and Colwyn Bay before becoming club groundsman with the Bay. Morris died on 4 November 2013.

Away from football, Morris became a successful insurance agent in the Colwyn Bay Area and afterwards ran his own entertainment agency in Colwyn Bay.

== Bibliography ==
- Sumner, Chas (1997). On the Borderline: The Official History of Chester City F.C. 1885-1997. Yore Publications. ISBN 978-1-874427-52-0.
- Owens, A (2006). Come on the Bay:Colwyn Bay's 125th Anniversary. design2print.
