= George Evans (footballer, born 1935) =

Welsh footballer

Personal information
- Full name: George Albert Evans
- Date of birth: 6 July 1935
- Place of birth: Rhostyllen, Wales
- Date of death: December 2000 (age 65)
- Position: Wing half

Youth career
- Bolton Wanderers
- Blackpool

Senior career*
Years	Team	Apps	(Gls)
ca. 1954–1955	Oswestry Town		
1955–1963	Wrexham	175	(9)
1963–1969	Chester	113	(0)
1969–1970	Bethesda Athletic		
1970–?	Colwyn Bay		
- * Club domestic league appearances and goals

George Albert Evans (26 July 1935 – December 2000) was a Welsh footballer who played as a wing half for Wrexham and Chester in the 1950s and 1960s.

== Playing career ==
Evans spent time as a youngster with Bolton Wanderers and Blackpool before playing non-league football for Oswestry Town. He later joined Wrexham as a part-time player, continuing to work at Bersham Colliery near Wrexham.

In October 1957 he made his debut in The Football League for Wrexham against Hartlepools United, going on to make 175 league appearances for the club until 1963. That summer saw Evans move to Chester along with Stan Bennion in exchange for Bill Myerscough, where he again more than 100 league appearances.

After leaving Chester in 1969, Evans played for Bethesda Athletic and Colwyn Bay while continuing to work for the National Coal Board.

== Honours ==
Wrexham

- Football League Fourth Division promotion: 1961–62 (third place)
- Welsh Cup winners: 1958; runners-up: 1962

Chester

- Welsh Cup runners-up: 1966
