= Les Jones (footballer, born 1940) =

Welsh footballer (born 1940)

Personal information
- Date of birth: 9 November 1940 (age 85)
- Place of birth: Wrexham, Wales
- Position: Inside forward

Youth career
- 1957–1962: Bolton Wanderers

Senior career*
Years	Team	Apps	(Gls)
1962–1965	Tranmere Rovers	68	(29)
1965–1970	Chester	135	(35)
- Runcorn
Total		203	(64)
- * Club domestic league appearances and goals

Les Jones (born 9 November 1940) is a Welsh retired footballer who played as an inside forward in the Football League for Tranmere Rovers.
