= Ray Jones (footballer, born 1944) =

English footballer and manager

Personal information
- Full name: Raymond Michael Jones
- Date of birth: 4 June 1944
- Place of birth: Chester, England
- Date of death: July 2007 (aged 63)
- Place of death: Chester, England
- Position: Full back

Senior career*
| Years | Team | Apps | (Gls) |
| 1962–1969 | Chester | 170 | (0) |
| 1969–1971 | Runcorn | | |
| 1971–197? | Oswestry Town | | |
| 197?–197? | Bethesda Athletic | | |
| 1974–1979 | Colwyn Bay | | |

Managerial career
- 1975–1979: Colwyn Bay
- c.1981–1986: Rhyl
- c.1989–1992: Connah's Quay Nomads
- * Club domestic league appearances and goals

Ray Jones (4 June 1944 – July 2007) was an English professional footballer who played as a full back. He was born and died in Chester, made 170 Football League appearances for Chester, and also played and managed in non-league football.

== Playing and Managerial Career ==
Jones joined Chester as a schoolboy, making his first-team debut in a 1–0 win over Hartlepool United on 7 December 1962 in the number 2 shirt. By the 1964–65 season Jones was a regular in the side, performing well when asked to mark George Best in an FA Cup tie against Manchester United in January 1965.

Jones and his namesake and fellow full-back Bryn Jones suffered fractured legs in a match against Aldershot twelve months later. The pair missed the remainder of the season as Chester fell out of promotion contention, with Ray not returning to action until October. He remained at the club until the end of the 1968–69 season, with his final game being a 1–0 home defeat to Exeter City on 19 April 1969.

That was to be the last Football League match played by Jones, as he joined non–league side Runcorn. He followed it up by playing for Oswestry Town, Bethesda Athletic and Colwyn Bay, where he became player–manager. He went on to have spells as manager of Rhyl, where he achieved three promotions, and Connah's Quay Nomads. Away from football he worked as an engineer.

Jones died in July 2007 at the Hospice of the Good Shepherd near Chester.
