= Hugh Ryden =

Scottish footballer

Personal information
- Full name: Hugh Johnston Ryden
- Date of birth: 7 April 1943 (age 83)
- Place of birth: Dumbarton, Scotland
- Position: Inside forward

Youth career
- Yoker Athletic
- 1960–1962: Leeds United

Senior career*
Years	Team	Apps	(Gls)
1962–1963	Bristol Rovers	8	(4)
1963–1964	Stockport County	38	(9)
1964–1968	Chester	141	(44)
1968–1970	Halifax Town	55	(6)
1970–1973	Stockport County	123	(15)
- Great Harwood Town
Total		365	(78)
- * Club domestic league appearances and goals

Hugh Johnston Ryden (born 7 April 1943) is a Scottish footballer, who played as an inside forward in the Football League for Bristol Rovers, Stockport County, Chester and Halifax Town. when playing for Chester in season 1964-65 under manager Peter Hauser, Hughie, as he was known, was part of the forward line that scored over 100 league goals and was a member of the team that narrowly lost to Manchester United (featuring Best, Law and Charlton, plus a future Chester player, Ian Moir) in the FA cup at Old Trafford.
