= Peter Hauser (footballer) =

Footballer (1934–2000)

Personal information
- Full name: Peter Benjamin Hauser
- Date of birth: 20 April 1934
- Place of birth: Kimberley, South Africa
- Date of death: 9 March 2000 (aged 65)
- Place of death: Port Elizabeth, South Africa
- Position: Wing half

Senior career*
Years	Team	Apps	(Gls)
1955–1962	Kimberley Athletic		
1962–1963	Blackpool	83	(10)
1962–1963	Cheltenham Town		
1963	Addington		
1963–1968	Chester	121	(3)
1968	Addington	20	(6)
1969	Johannesburg Corinthians		
1969–1970	Highlands Park		

Managerial career
- 1963–1968: Chester
- * Club domestic league appearances and goals

Peter Benjamin Hauser (20 April 1934 – 9 March 2000) was a South African soccer player and manager. He played professional football for Blackpool before becoming player-manager of Chester in 1963. This made him one of the first foreign managers in English football.

A wing-half, former underground surveyor Hauser made 83 English Football League appearances (scoring 10 goals) for Blackpool between 1955 and 1962, before dropping out of professional football and joining Cheltenham Town.

Following the departure of Bill Lambton, 29-year-old Hauser took over as manager of Chester shortly before the 1963–64 season got underway. Chester had endured very little success since the Second World War but Hauser set about improving the club's fortunes. A mid-table finish in Division Four in his first season represented progress after three successive re-election applications, before steering the club through an amazing 1964–65. The club scored 119 league goals and a further 22 in the two main cup competitions, with all five regular forwards scoring at least 20. Hauser was a regular throughout the season, which saw Chester finish just 8th despite their goal glut.

The 1965–66 campaign saw Chester finish 7th, after looking favourites for promotion before full back namesakes Ray and Bryn Jones both suffered broken legs against Aldershot on New Year's Day. Chester's fortunes began to decline after this and, after struggling in 1966–67 (after which Hauser stopped playing), things got worse a year later. A home defeat to fellow strugglers Workington on 17 February 1968 brought to an end Hauser's five years in charge, and his association with professional football in England.

After leaving Chester, Hauser returned to South Africa to resume his underground surveying career.
