= 1967–68 Chester F.C. season =

Chester
1967–68 season
- Manager: Peter Hauser; Ken Roberts
- Stadium: Sealand Road
- Football League Fourth Division: 22nd
- FA Cup: Second round
- Football League Cup: First round
- Welsh Cup: Semifinal
- Top goalscorer: League: Eddie Loyden (22); All: Eddie Loyden (24)
- Highest home attendance: 10,733 vs Wrexham (15 November)
- Lowest home attendance: 2,484 vs Doncaster Rovers (2 March)
- Average home league attendance: 4,415; 18th in division

The 1967–68 season was the 30th season of competitive association football in the Football League played by Chester, an English club based in Chester, Cheshire.

Also, it was the tenth season spent in the Fourth Division after its creation. Alongside competing in the Football League the club also participated in the FA Cup, Football League Cup and the Welsh Cup.

== Football League ==
Pos	Team	Pld	W	D	L	GF	GA	GAv	Pts	Promotion or relegation
20	Exeter City	46	11	16	19	45	65	0.692	38	
21	York City	46	11	14	21	65	68	0.956	36	Re-elected
22	Chester	46	9	14	23	57	78	0.731	32	Re-elected
23	Workington	46	10	11	25	54	87	0.621	31	Re-elected
24	Bradford Park Avenue	46	4	15	27	30	82	0.366	23	Re-elected

Source: rsssf.com
Rules for classification: 1) points; 2) goal average; 3) number of goals scored.

=== Results summary ===
Overall								Home						Away					
Pld	W	D	L	GF	GA	GAv	Pts	W	D	L	GF	GA	Pts	W	D	L	GF	GA	Pts
46	9	14	23	57	78	0.731	32	6	6	11	35	38	18	3	8	12	22	40	14

Source: rsssf.com

=== Results by matchday ===
Round	1	2	3	4	5	6	7	8	9	10	11	12	13	14	15	16	17	18	19	20	21	22	23	24	25	26	27	28	29	30	31	32	33	34	35	36	37	38	39	40	41	42	43	44	45	46
Result	W	D	L	L	L	W	W	L	L	L	D	D	W	L	D	L	L	D	W	D	L	L	D	L	W	L	D	L	L	L	D	L	L	W	W	D	W	D	D	D	L	L	L	L	D	L
Position	4	8	15	17	21	17	16	16	18	22	20	21	19	19	18	19	19	19	18	15	19	22	20	23	19	22	22	23	23	23	23	23	23	23	23	23	22	22	22	22	22	22	22	22	22	22

Source: statto.com
W = Win; D = Draw; L = Loss

=== Matches ===
Date	Opponents	Venue	Result	Score	Scorers	Attendance
19 August	Notts County	A	W	2–1	Loyden (2, 1pen.)	6,599
26 August	Port Vale	H	D	1–1	Loyden (pen.)	7,932
2 September	Wrexham	A	L	0–2		11,740
6 September	Crewe Alexandra	H	L	0–4		7,087
9 September	Chesterfield	A	L	1–3	L. Jones	8,618
16 September	Exeter City	H	W	3–1	Morris, Loyden (2, 1pen.)	4,045
23 September	Darlington	A	W	2–0	Morris, Loyden	4,877
27 September	Crewe Alexandra	A	L	0–2		8,846
30 September	Aldershot	H	L	2–5	Loyden, Morris	5,380
7 October	Luton Town	H	L	1–3	L. Jones	3,967
14 October	Doncaster Rovers	A	D	0–0		6,002
21 October	Bradford Park Avenue	H	D	0–0		3,717
25 October	Halifax Town	H	W	3–2	Metcalf, Hancox, Morris	3,419
28 October	Brentford	A	L	1–3	Hancox	6,285
31 October	Halifax Town	A	D	2–2	Morris (2)	4,105
4 November	Rochdale	H	L	0–1		4,068
11 November	York City	A	L	1–4	Metcalf	5,226
15 November	Wrexham	H	D	1–1	Metcalf	10,733
18 November	Newport County	H	W	2–1	Moir, Hancox	3,704
24 November	Hartlepools United	A	D	0–0		4,638
2 December	Swansea Town	H	L	2–3	Hughes, Ashworth	4,028
16 December	Notts County	H	L	1–3	Hancox	3,576
23 December	Port Vale	A	D	4–4	Hughes, Loyden (2), L. Jones	3,740
26 December	Lincoln City	A	L	0–3		8,740
30 December	Lincoln City	H	W	6–0	Loyden (4), Moir (2)	2,876
20 January	Exeter City	A	L	0–1		4,336
27 January	Southend United	H	D	0–0		4,623
3 February	Darlington	H	L	0–1		3,353
10 February	Aldershot	A	L	1–2	Morris	4,821
17 February	Workington	H	L	1–2	Metcalf	3,026
24 February	Newport County	A	D	1–1		4,369
2 March	Doncaster Rovers	H	L	2–3	Loyden, Metcalf	2,484
8 March	Southend United	A	L	1–5	Metcalf	9,437
16 March	Bradford Park Avenue	A	W	2–0	Loyden, Metcalf	3,050
23 March	Brentford	H	W	3–0	Ashworth, Haddock, Loyden	2,861
30 March	Rochdale	A	D	1–1	Loyden	2,212
3 April	Chesterfield	H	W	3–0	Metcalf, Loyden, L. Jones	3,103
6 April	York City	H	D	1–1	L. Jones	4,170
13 April	Luton Town	A	D	0–0		13,266
15 April	Bradford City	A	D	2–2	Loyden (2)	6,443
16 April	Bradford City	H	L	2–3	Loyden, L. Jones	5,003
20 April	Hartlepools United	H	L	0–2		3,990
23 April	Barnsley	A	L	1–2	Murphy (o.g.)	14,596
27 April	Swansea Town	A	L	0–1		3,617
4 May	Barnsley	H	D	1–1	Loyden	4,402
11 May	Workington	A	L	0–1		1,008

== FA Cup ==
Round	Date	Opponents	Venue	Result	Score	Scorers	Attendance
First round	9 December	Port Vale (4)	A	W	2–1	Metcalf, Hancox	4,171
Second round	6 January	Chesterfield (4)	H	L	0–1		11,320

== League Cup ==
Round	Date	Opponents	Venue	Result	Score	Scorers	Attendance
First round	22 August	Port Vale (4)	A	L	0–3		5,006

== Welsh Cup ==
Round	Date	Opponents	Venue	Result	Score	Scorers	Attendance
Fifth round	17 January	Bangor City (CCL)	H	W	2–1	Hughes, Loyden	3,363
Quarterfinal	14 February	Brymbo Steelworks (Wrexham & District League)	A	W	8–0	Bennett (2), Ashworth, Metcalf, Hancox, Loyden, L. Jones (2)	3,000
Semifinal	27 March	Cardiff City (2)	H	L	0–3		5,844

== Season statistics ==
Nat	Player	Total		League		FA Cup		League Cup		Welsh Cup	
Nat	Player	A	G	A	G	A	G	A	G	A	G
Goalkeepers
(England)	Terry Carling	48	–	43	–	1	–	1	–	3	–
(England)	Simon Jones	4	–	3	–	1	–	–	–	–	–
Field players
(England)	Barry Ashworth	45+1	3	40+1	2	2	–	–	–	3	1
(England)	John Bennett	29+3	2	25+2	–	1+1	–	1	–	2	2
(England)	John Butler	11	–	11	–	–	–	–	–	–	–
(Wales)	George Evans	29+2	–	26+2	–	1	–	–	–	2	–
(Scotland)	Andy Haddock	11	1	10	1	–	–	–	–	1	–
(England)	David Hancox	21+2	6	17+2	4	2	1	–	–	2	1
(England)	Alan Hughes	12	3	9	2	2	–	–	–	1	1
(Wales)	Les Jones	39+2	8	36+2	6	–	–	1	–	2	2
(England)	Ray Jones	39	–	33	–	2	–	1	–	3	–
(England)	Eddie Loyden	43	24	37	22	2	–	1	–	3	2
	Tony McLoughlin	2+2	–	2+2	–	–	–	–	–	–	–
(England)	Gerry Mannion	7	–	6	–	–	–	–	–	1	–
(England)	Mike Metcalf	48	10	42	8	2	1	1	–	3	1
(Scotland)	Ian Moir	28	3	25	3	2	–	1	–	–	–
(Wales)	Elfed Morris	20+3	8	19+3	8	–	–	–	–	1	–
(England)	Eddie Rampling	2+1	–	2+1	–	–	–	–	–	–	–
(England)	Albert Robinson	2	–	2	–	–	–	–	–	–	–
(Scotland)	Hugh Ryden	15	–	14	–	–	–	1	–	–	–
(England)	John Sealey	0+2	–	0+1	–	–	–	–	–	0+1	–
	Gordon Seaton	24+3	–	20+3	–	2	–	1	–	0+1	–
(England)	Tommy Singleton	22	–	20	–	–	–	1	–	1	–
(England)	Mike Sutton	52	–	46	–	2	–	1	–	3	–
(England)	Graham Turner	20	–	18	–	–	–	–	–	2	–
	Own goals	–	1	–	1	–	–	–	–	–	–
	Total	52	69	46	57	2	2	1	–	3	10
