= Haddock (disambiguation) =

Haddock is a North Atlantic fish caught for food.

Haddock may also refer to:

== Places ==
- Haddock, Alberta, a locality in Canada
- Haddock, Georgia, an unincorporated town in the US

== Other uses ==
- Haddock (surname), including a list of people and fictional characters with the name, including
  - Captain Haddock, a cartoon character by Hergé
- USS Haddock, three US Navy submarines
- Haddock (software), a software documentation generator for the Haskell programming language
- Haddock Force, a Royal Air Force operation against Northern Italy at the beginning of Second World War
