= Alan Hughes (footballer) =

English footballer

Personal information
- Date of birth: 5 October 1948 (age 78)
- Place of birth: Wallasey, England
- Position: Forward

Youth career
- Liverpool

Senior career*
Years	Team	Apps	(Gls)
1966–1968	Liverpool	0	(0)
1967–1968	→ Chester (loan)	9	(2)
- * Club domestic league appearances and goals

Alan Hughes (born 5 October 1948) is an English former footballer who played as a forward.

Hughes made nine appearances in The Football League with Chester in 1967–68, during a loan spell from Liverpool (where he failed to make any league appearances). Hughes replaced David Hancox in the Chester number nine shirt when he made his debut in November 1967, with the two-month loan spell also yielding two FA Cup appearances and a Welsh Cup outing. His two league goals came against Swansea Town and Port Vale. His loan spell expired in January 1968 and he did not play again in the Football League.

== Bibliography ==
- Sumner, Chas (1997). On the Borderline: The Official History of Chester City F.C. 1885-1997. Yore Publications. ISBN 978-1-874427-52-0.
