= Rampling =

Surname

Rampling is a surname. Notable people with the surname include:

- Anne Rampling, a pseudonym used by writer Anne Rice
- Charlotte Rampling, OBE (born 1946), British-French actress (daughter of Godfrey)
- Clark Rampling (1793–1875), English architect
- Danny Rampling (born 1961), British House Music DJ
- Eddie Rampling (born 1948), English footballer
- Godfrey Rampling (1909–2009), English athlete and army officer (father of Charlotte)
- Isabelle Rampling (born 1985), Canadian synchronized swimmer
- Tony Rampling (born 1961), former professional rugby league footballer in the New South Wales Rugby League
