= 1967–68 in English football =

Football in England
- Season: 1967–68

Men's football
- First Division: Manchester City
- Second Division: Ipswich Town
- Third Division: Oxford United
- Fourth Division: Luton Town
- FA Cup: West Bromwich Albion
- League Cup: Leeds United
- Charity Shield: Manchester United

The 1967–68 season was the 88th season of competitive football in England. Defending First Division champions, Manchester United, became the first English team to win the European Cup, while the First Division title went to their cross city rivals City. West Bromwich Albion lifted the FA Cup this season, for the fifth time in their history. Leeds United won their first two major trophies when they lifted the Inter-Cities Fairs Cup and Football League Cup at the expense of an Arsenal side who had not played at Wembley for 16 years.

== Honours ==
Competition	Winner	Runner-up
First Division	Manchester City (2)	Manchester United
Second Division	Ipswich Town	Queens Park Rangers
Third Division	Oxford United	Bury
Fourth Division	Luton Town	Barnsley
FA Cup	West Bromwich Albion (5)	Everton
League Cup	Leeds United (1)	Arsenal
Charity Shield	Manchester United and Tottenham Hotspur (shared)	
Home Championship	England	Scotland

Notes. Number in parentheses is the times that club has won that honour.

== FA Cup ==
The 1968 FA Cup final was won by West Bromwich Albion, who beat Everton 1–0 at Wembley with an extra time goal from Jeff Astle. It was Albion's fifth FA Cup success.

== League Cup ==
Leeds United beat Arsenal 1–0 in the 1968 Football League Cup final at Wembley to win the competition for the first time.

== Football League ==
=== First Division ===
For the first time since 1937, Manchester City won the First Division, finishing two points clear of their local rivals Manchester United. Fulham finished in last place and were relegated along with Sheffield United. Coventry City, under Noel Cantwell escaped relegation by one point and would go on to stay in the top division until their eventual relegation at the end of the 2000–01 season.

Manchester United's George Best and Ron Davies of Southampton finished as Division One's joint-top scorers with 28 goals apiece. Best was awarded the Football Writers' Association Footballer of the Year, as well as the European Footballer of the Year award.

Pos	Team	Pld	W	D	L	GF	GA	GAv	Pts	Qualification or relegation
1	Manchester City (C)	42	26	6	10	86	43	2.000	58	Qualification for the European Cup first round (Note: Manchester United qualified for the European Cup as the 1967–68 European Cup winners.)
2	Manchester United	42	24	8	10	89	55	1.618	56	Qualification for the European Cup first round
3	Liverpool	42	22	11	9	71	40	1.775	55	Qualification for the Inter-Cities Fairs Cup first round
4	Leeds United	42	22	9	11	71	41	1.732	53	Qualification for the Inter-Cities Fairs Cup first round
5	Everton	42	23	6	13	67	40	1.675	52	
6	Chelsea	42	18	12	12	62	68	0.912	48	Qualification for the Inter-Cities Fairs Cup first round (Note: Everton were ineligible to participate in the Inter-Cities Fairs Cup as Liverpool had already qualified. Under the rules of the cup, only one team per city could participate. Chelsea took their place as the highest-ranked team that had not already qualified for a European competition.)
7	Tottenham Hotspur	42	19	9	14	70	59	1.186	47	
8	West Bromwich Albion	42	17	12	13	75	62	1.210	46	Qualification for the European Cup Winners' Cup first round (Note: West Bromwich Albion qualified for the European Cup Winners' Cup as the 1967-68 FA Cup winners.)
9	Arsenal	42	17	10	15	60	56	1.071	44	
10	Newcastle United	42	13	15	14	54	67	0.806	41	Qualification for the Inter-Cities Fairs Cup first round (Note: Arsenal and Tottenham Hotspur were ineligible to participate in the Inter-Cities Fairs Cup as Chelsea had already qualified. Under the rules of the cup, only one team per city could participate. Newcastle United took their place as the highest-ranked team that had not already qualified for a European competition.)
11	Nottingham Forest	42	14	11	17	52	64	0.813	39	
12	West Ham United	42	14	10	18	73	69	1.058	38	
13	Leicester City	42	13	12	17	64	69	0.928	38	
14	Burnley	42	14	10	18	64	71	0.901	38	
15	Sunderland	42	13	11	18	51	61	0.836	37	
16	Southampton	42	13	11	18	66	83	0.795	37	
17	Wolverhampton Wanderers	42	14	8	20	66	75	0.880	36	
18	Stoke City	42	14	7	21	50	73	0.685	35	
19	Sheffield Wednesday	42	11	12	19	51	63	0.810	34	
20	Coventry City	42	9	15	18	51	71	0.718	33	
21	Sheffield United (R)	42	11	10	21	49	70	0.700	32	Relegation to the Second Division
22	Fulham (R)	42	10	7	25	56	98	0.571	27	Relegation to the Second Division

Source: World Football
Rules for classification: 1) Points; 2) Goal average; 3) Goals scored
(C) Champions; (R) Relegated

=== Second Division ===
Bill McGarry's Ipswich Town team won the Second Division by one point from Queens Park Rangers, with both teams promoted. Blackpool finished third on goal average and so missed out. Rotherham United and bottom club Plymouth Argyle were both relegated to the Third Division.

Pos	Team	Pld	W	D	L	GF	GA	GAv	Pts	Qualification or relegation
1	Ipswich Town (C, P)	42	22	15	5	79	44	1.795	59	Promotion to the First Division
2	Queens Park Rangers (P)	42	25	8	9	67	36	1.861	58	Promotion to the First Division
3	Blackpool	42	24	10	8	71	43	1.651	58	
4	Birmingham City	42	19	14	9	83	51	1.627	52	
5	Portsmouth	42	18	13	11	68	55	1.236	49	
6	Middlesbrough	42	17	12	13	60	54	1.111	46	
7	Millwall	42	14	17	11	62	50	1.240	45	
8	Blackburn Rovers	42	16	11	15	56	49	1.143	43	
9	Norwich City	42	16	11	15	60	65	0.923	43	
10	Carlisle United	42	14	13	15	58	52	1.115	41	
11	Crystal Palace	42	14	11	17	56	56	1.000	39	
12	Bolton Wanderers	42	13	13	16	60	63	0.952	39	
13	Cardiff City	42	13	12	17	60	66	0.909	38	Qualification for the Cup Winners' Cup first round (Note: Cardiff City qualified for the European Cup Winners' Cup as the 1967–68 Welsh Cup winners.)
14	Huddersfield Town	42	13	12	17	46	61	0.754	38	
15	Charlton Athletic	42	12	13	17	63	68	0.926	37	
16	Aston Villa	42	15	7	20	54	64	0.844	37	
17	Hull City	42	12	13	17	58	73	0.795	37	
18	Derby County	42	13	10	19	71	78	0.910	36	
19	Bristol City	42	13	10	19	48	62	0.774	36	
20	Preston North End	42	12	11	19	43	65	0.662	35	
21	Rotherham United (R)	42	10	11	21	42	76	0.553	31	Relegation to the Third Division
22	Plymouth Argyle (R)	42	9	9	24	38	72	0.528	27	Relegation to the Third Division

Rules for classification: 1) Points; 2) Goal average; 3) Goals scored
(C) Champions; (P) Promoted; (R) Relegated

=== Third Division ===
In the Third Division, Oxford United won their first divisional title and achieved what was then their highest ever finish in only their sixth season as a league club. Runners-up Bury joined them in promotion. Grimsby Town, Colchester United and Scunthorpe United were relegated, although the biggest story concerned bottom placed Peterborough United who were docked 19 points for offering irregular bonuses to their players and so finished bottom. Had the points been restored the club would have finished in the top half. As a result of the ruling Mansfield Town escaped relegation.

Pos	Team	Pld	W	D	L	GF	GA	GAv	Pts	Promotion or relegation
1	Oxford United (C, P)	46	22	13	11	69	47	1.468	57	Promotion to the Second Division
2	Bury (P)	46	24	8	14	91	66	1.379	56	Promotion to the Second Division
3	Shrewsbury Town	46	20	15	11	61	49	1.245	55	
4	Torquay United	46	21	11	14	60	56	1.071	53	
5	Reading	46	21	9	16	70	60	1.167	51	
6	Watford	46	21	8	17	74	50	1.480	50	
7	Walsall	46	19	12	15	74	61	1.213	50	
8	Barrow	46	21	8	17	65	54	1.204	50	
9	Swindon Town	46	16	17	13	74	51	1.451	49	
10	Brighton & Hove Albion	46	16	16	14	57	55	1.036	48	
11	Gillingham	46	18	12	16	59	63	0.937	48	
12	Bournemouth & Boscombe Athletic	46	16	15	15	56	51	1.098	47	
13	Stockport County	46	19	9	18	70	75	0.933	47	
14	Southport	46	17	12	17	65	65	1.000	46	
15	Bristol Rovers	46	17	9	20	72	78	0.923	43	
16	Oldham Athletic	46	18	7	21	60	65	0.923	43	
17	Northampton Town	46	14	13	19	58	72	0.806	41	
18	Orient	46	12	17	17	46	62	0.742	41	
19	Tranmere Rovers	46	14	12	20	62	74	0.838	40	
20	Mansfield Town	46	12	13	21	51	67	0.761	37	
21	Grimsby Town (R)	46	14	9	23	52	69	0.754	37	Relegation to the Fourth Division
22	Colchester United (R)	46	9	15	22	50	87	0.575	33	Relegation to the Fourth Division
23	Scunthorpe United (R)	46	10	12	24	56	87	0.644	32	Relegation to the Fourth Division
24	Peterborough United (R)	46	20	10	16	79	67	1.179	31 (Note: Peterborough United were deducted 19 points for making irregular payments to players.)	Relegation to the Fourth Division

Source: rsssf.com
(C) Champions; (P) Promoted; (R) Relegated

=== Fourth Division ===
Luton Town won the Fourth Division and were promoted along with Barnsley, Hartlepools United and Crewe Alexandra. The bottom four clubs were forced to apply to re-election to the Football League as per usual; more unusually however, Port Vale were also made to apply for re-election, as a result of financial irregularities. In the end, all five clubs were re-elected.

Pos	Team	Pld	W	D	L	GF	GA	GAv	Pts	Promotion or relegation
1	Luton Town (C, P)	46	27	12	7	87	44	1.977	66	Promotion to the Third Division
2	Barnsley (P)	46	24	13	9	68	46	1.478	61	Promotion to the Third Division
3	Hartlepools United (P)	46	25	10	11	60	46	1.304	60	Promotion to the Third Division
4	Crewe Alexandra (P)	46	20	18	8	74	49	1.510	58	Promotion to the Third Division
5	Bradford City	46	23	11	12	72	51	1.412	57	
6	Southend United	46	20	14	12	77	58	1.328	54	
7	Chesterfield	46	21	11	14	71	50	1.420	53	
8	Wrexham	46	20	13	13	72	53	1.358	53	
9	Aldershot	46	18	17	11	70	55	1.273	53	
10	Doncaster Rovers	46	18	15	13	66	56	1.179	51	
11	Halifax Town	46	15	16	15	52	49	1.061	46	
12	Newport County	46	16	13	17	58	63	0.921	45	
13	Lincoln City	46	17	9	20	71	68	1.044	43	
14	Brentford	46	18	7	21	61	64	0.953	43	
15	Swansea Town	46	16	10	20	63	77	0.818	42	
16	Darlington	46	12	17	17	47	53	0.887	41	
17	Notts County	46	15	11	20	53	79	0.671	41	
18	Port Vale	46	12	15	19	61	72	0.847	39 (Note: Due to financial irregularities, Port Vale were initially expelled from the league, but this punishment was later reduced to applying for re-election.)	Re-elected
19	Rochdale	46	12	14	20	51	72	0.708	38	
20	Exeter City	46	11	16	19	45	65	0.692	38	
21	York City	46	11	14	21	65	68	0.956	36	Re-elected
22	Chester	46	9	14	23	57	78	0.731	32	Re-elected
23	Workington	46	10	11	25	54	87	0.621	31	Re-elected
24	Bradford (Park Avenue)	46	4	15	27	30	82	0.366	23	Re-elected

Source: rsssf.com
Rules for classification: 1) points; 2) goal average; 3) number of goals scored.
(C) Champions; (P) Promoted

=== Top goalscorers ===
First Division

- George Best (Manchester United) and Ron Davies (Southampton) – 28 goals

Second Division

- John Hickton (Middlesbrough) – 24 goals

Third Division

- Don Rogers (Swindon Town) – 25 goals

Fourth Division

- Les Massie (Halifax Town) and Roy Chapman (Port Vale) – 25 goals

== European football ==
Manchester United became the first English team to win the European Cup when they beat Benfica 4–1 after extra time in the final at Wembley Stadium. Bobby Charlton (2), George Best and Brian Kidd scored the goals. Manager Matt Busby was knighted that year for his achievements.

Leeds United reached the final of the Fairs Cup by beating Scottish side Dundee. Eddie Gray scored the decisive goal in the second leg to secure a 2–1 aggregate victory. In the final, which was not completed until September 1968, Leeds defeated Ferencváros 1–0 on aggregate.

== Events of the season ==
- 12 August 1967 – Tottenham Hotspur's goalkeeper Pat Jennings scores in the Charity Shield as Spurs draw 3–3 with Manchester United at Old Trafford.
- 19 August 1967 – The League champions Manchester United open the First Division season with a 3–1 defeat to Everton. Liverpool and Manchester City draw 0–0, and Coventry City's first match in the First Division ends in a 2–1 loss at Burnley.
- 26 August 1967 – Sheffield Wednesday are the early leaders of the First Division, the only team with three wins out of three. Defeats for Manchester City and Leeds United leave both teams without a League win from their first three matches.
- 2 September 1967 – Southampton thrash Chelsea 6–2 at Stamford Bridge. Burnley beat Tottenham Hotspur 5–1, and Sheffield Wednesday win the Steel City derby to top the League table.
- 16 September 1967 – Manchester City's fifth consecutive League win, 5–2 against Sheffield United sees them join Liverpool, Arsenal, Sheffield Wednesday and Tottenham Hotspur at the top of the League table.
- 7 October 1967 – After scoring just ten goals in their first nine League matches, Leeds United hammer Chelsea 7–0 at Elland Road. Liverpool lose at Leicester City, allowing Sheffield Wednesday to return to the top of the table.
- 28 October 1967 – Liverpool beat Sheffield Wednesday 1–0 at Anfield to lead the First Division at the end of October.
- 11 November 1967 – Manchester United beat Liverpool 2–1 and replace them at the top of the League table. Manchester City are third after beating Leicester City 6–0. West Bromwich Albion thrash Burnley 8–1.
- 9 December 1967 – Manchester City move to within a point of the leaders Manchester United by beating Tottenham Hotspur 4–1 on a snow-covered pitch at Maine Road with goals from Colin Bell, Mike Summerbee, Tony Coleman and Neil Young.
- 30 December 1967 – Manchester United end the calendar year top of the First Division, three points ahead of Liverpool and four ahead of Leeds United. Manchester City drop to fourth after losing to West Bromwich Albion for the second time in four days. Coventry City and Fulham occupy the relegation places.
- 13 January 1968 – Leeds United move into second place in the League by beating Southampton 5–0, having beaten Fulham by the same score the previous week.
- 17 February 1968 – Manchester United lose in the League for the first time since October when they go down 2–1 at Burnley, but they remain a point clear of Leeds United at the top of the table.
- 16 March 1968 – Manchester United's defeat at Coventry allows Manchester City to move to the top of the table on goal average by beating bottom-of-the-table Fulham 5–1. They lead Leeds United by one point, with Liverpool a further point behind.
- 27 March 1968 – Manchester City win the League derby at Old Trafford, leaving both teams locked together with Leeds United at the top of the table with nine games remaining.
- 6 April 1968 – Manchester United are beaten 2–1 at home by Liverpool, their second consecutive home defeat in the League. Manchester City lose at Leicester, allowing Leeds United to move to the top of the table with a 3–0 win over relegation-threatened Sheffield United.
- 29 April 1968 – Manchester City move back to the top of the First Division by beating Everton 2–0 while Manchester United are thrashed 6–3 by free-scoring West Bromwich Albion at The Hawthorns.
- 1 May 1968 – Fulham lose 2–0 at home to Stoke City and are relegated from the First Division.
- 4 May 1968 – Liverpool keep their title hopes alive by beating Leeds United 2–1. Both teams trail the two Manchester clubs by three points, with City remaining ahead of United on goal average.
- 7 May 1968 – Leeds United's third consecutive League defeat, 4–3 at Arsenal, eliminates them from the Championship race. Manchester City, Manchester United and Liverpool remain in contention going into the final Saturday.
- 11 May 1968 – Manchester City win the First Division title for the first time since 1937 with a 4–3 away win against Newcastle United. Manchester United surrender their title by losing 2–1 at home to Sunderland. Sheffield United take the second relegation spot after losing at home to Chelsea.

== Deaths ==
- 7 March 1968 – Grenville Hair, 36, former Leeds United left back and current Bradford City manager, from heart attack during training.
