= Haddock (surname) =

Haddock is a surname of English. It may refer to many people.

It may come from the medieval word Ædduc, a diminutive of Æddi, a short form of various compound names including the root ēad, meaning prosperity or fortune.

It may also refer to someone who comes from Haydock, a town near Liverpool. "Haydock" probably comes from the Welsh word heiddog, meaning "characterized by barley".

It may also come from Middle English hadduc, referring to someone who worked as a fisherman or a fish seller, or who looked like a fish.

== A ==
- Andy Haddock (born 1946), Scottish former footballer
- Austin Mitchell (1934–2021), briefly named Austin Haddock, a British Member of Parliament

== C ==
- Charles Brickett Haddock (1796–1861), New Hampshire educator and politician
- Chris Haddock, Canadian screenwriter and producer

== D ==
- Doris Haddock (1910–2010), politician and liberal political activist from New Hampshire

== E ==
- Eric John Haddock, birth name of Eric Haydock (1943–2019), original bass guitarist of the band The Hollies
- Edward E. Haddock (1911–1996), American physician and politician

== F ==
- Francis Oliver Haddock (1892–1934), police officer killed in the line of duty
- Frank Channing Haddock (1853–1915), American New Thought and self-help author

== G ==
- George Haddock (baseball) (1866–1926), American Major League baseball pitcher
- George Haddock (musician) (1823–1907), British Violinist and Professor of Music
- George Haddock (politician) (1863–1930), British Conservative member of Parliament
- Gray Haddock (born 1982), American actor and film producer

== H ==
- Harry Haddock (1925–1998), Scottish footballer
- Herbert Haddock (1861–1946), captain of the RMS Olympic

== J ==
- Julie Anne Haddock (born 1965), American child actress of the 1970s and '80s

== L ==
- Laura Haddock (born 1985), English actress

== M ==
- Marcus Haddock (born 1957), American opera singer and voice teacher
- Mark Haddock (born 1968), Northern Irish Loyalist paramilitary leader and British Special Branch informer

== N ==
- Natalia Margaret Haddock (born 1996), better known as Talia Mar, British singer-songwriter and internet personality.
- Neil Haddock (born 1964), Welsh super-featherweight boxing champion
- Nicholas Haddock (1686–1746), admiral in the British Royal Navy and Member of Parliament

== P ==
- Perry Haddock (born 1959), Australian former rugby league footballer
- Peter Haddock (born 1961), English footballer

== R ==
- Richard Haddock (c. 1629–1715), Royal Navy admiral and Member of Parliament
- Richard Haddock (Royal Navy officer, born 1673), son of the above

== W ==
- Walter Haddock (1890–1972), a pioneer Australian rugby league footballer
- William F. Haddock (1877–1969), American silent film director

== Fictional characters ==
- Mr. Albert Haddock, a litigant in the works of A. P. Herbert
- Captain Haddock, a cartoon character in The Adventures of Tintin series
- Fanny Haddock, a cook in the radio series Beyond Our Ken and Round the Horne
- Sir Francis Haddock, the ancestor of Captain Haddock in The Adventures of Tintin series
- Hiccup Horrendous Haddock III, in the book and film series How to Train Your Dragon
