= 1967–68 Football League =

69th season of the Football League

The Football League
- Season: 1967–68
- Champions: Manchester City

The 1967–68 season was the 69th completed season of the English Football League.

For the first time since 1937 Manchester City won the league title, finishing two points clear of their local rivals Manchester United. Fulham finished bottom of the league and were relegated along with Sheffield United. Coventry City, in their first ever top flight season escaped relegation by one point and would go on to stay in the top division until their eventual relegation at the end of the 2000–01 season.

Bill McGarry's Ipswich Town team won the Second Division by one point from Queens Park Rangers, with both teams promoted. Blackpool finished third on goal average and so missed out. Rotherham United and bottom club Plymouth Argyle were both relegated to the Third Division.

Oxford United won their first divisional title and achieved what was then their highest ever finish in only their sixth season as a league club in the Third Division. Runners-up Bury joined them in promotion. Grimsby Town, Colchester United and Scunthorpe United were relegated, although the biggest story concerned bottom placed Peterborough United who were docked 19 points for offering irregular bonuses to their players. Had the points been restored the club would have finished in the top half. As a result of the ruling Mansfield Town escaped relegation.

Luton Town won the Fourth Division and were promoted along with Barnsley, Hartlepools United and Crewe Alexandra. No clubs were voted out of the league.

== Final league tables and results ==
Beginning with the season 1894–95, clubs finishing level on points were separated according to goal average (goals scored divided by goals conceded), or more properly put, goal ratio. In case one or more teams had the same goal difference, this system favoured those teams who had scored fewer goals. The goal average system was eventually replaced by goal difference, beginning with the 1976–77 season.

Since the Fourth Division was established in the 1958–59 season, the bottom four teams of that division were required to apply for re-election.

== First Division ==
First Division
- Season: 1967–68
- Champions: Manchester City; 2nd English title
- Relegated: Sheffield United; Fulham
- European Cup: Manchester City; Manchester United
- European Cup Winners' Cup: West Bromwich Albion
- Inter-Cities Fairs Cup: Liverpool; Leeds United; Chelsea; Newcastle United
- Matches: 462
- Goals: 1,398 (3.03 per match)
- Top goalscorer: George Best; Ron Davies (28 goals each)
- Longest winning run: 7 matches Everton
- Longest unbeaten run: 14 matches Leeds United
- Longest losing run: 7 matches Stoke City

Pos	Team	Pld	W	D	L	GF	GA	GAv	Pts	Qualification or relegation
1	Manchester City (C)	42	26	6	10	86	43	2.000	58	Qualification for the European Cup first round (Note: Manchester United qualified for the European Cup as the 1967–68 European Cup winners.)
2	Manchester United	42	24	8	10	89	55	1.618	56	Qualification for the European Cup first round
3	Liverpool	42	22	11	9	71	40	1.775	55	Qualification for the Inter-Cities Fairs Cup first round
4	Leeds United	42	22	9	11	71	41	1.732	53	Qualification for the Inter-Cities Fairs Cup first round
5	Everton	42	23	6	13	67	40	1.675	52	
6	Chelsea	42	18	12	12	62	68	0.912	48	Qualification for the Inter-Cities Fairs Cup first round (Note: Everton were ineligible to participate in the Inter-Cities Fairs Cup as Liverpool had already qualified. Under the rules of the cup, only one team per city could participate. Chelsea took their place as the highest-ranked team that had not already qualified for a European competition.)
7	Tottenham Hotspur	42	19	9	14	70	59	1.186	47	
8	West Bromwich Albion	42	17	12	13	75	62	1.210	46	Qualification for the European Cup Winners' Cup first round (Note: West Bromwich Albion qualified for the European Cup Winners' Cup as the 1967-68 FA Cup winners.)
9	Arsenal	42	17	10	15	60	56	1.071	44	
10	Newcastle United	42	13	15	14	54	67	0.806	41	Qualification for the Inter-Cities Fairs Cup first round (Note: Arsenal and Tottenham Hotspur were ineligible to participate in the Inter-Cities Fairs Cup as Chelsea had already qualified. Under the rules of the cup, only one team per city could participate. Newcastle United took their place as the highest-ranked team that had not already qualified for a European competition.)
11	Nottingham Forest	42	14	11	17	52	64	0.813	39	
12	West Ham United	42	14	10	18	73	69	1.058	38	
13	Leicester City	42	13	12	17	64	69	0.928	38	
14	Burnley	42	14	10	18	64	71	0.901	38	
15	Sunderland	42	13	11	18	51	61	0.836	37	
16	Southampton	42	13	11	18	66	83	0.795	37	
17	Wolverhampton Wanderers	42	14	8	20	66	75	0.880	36	
18	Stoke City	42	14	7	21	50	73	0.685	35	
19	Sheffield Wednesday	42	11	12	19	51	63	0.810	34	
20	Coventry City	42	9	15	18	51	71	0.718	33	
21	Sheffield United (R)	42	11	10	21	49	70	0.700	32	Relegation to the Second Division
22	Fulham (R)	42	10	7	25	56	98	0.571	27	Relegation to the Second Division

Source: World Football
Rules for classification: 1) Points; 2) Goal average; 3) Goals scored
(C) Champions; (R) Relegated

=== Results ===
Home \ Away	ARS	BUR	CHE	COV	EVE	FUL	LEE	LEI	LIV	MCI	MUN	NEW	NOT	SHU	SHW	SOU	STK	SUN	TOT	WBA	WHU	WOL
Arsenal		2–0	1–1	1–1	2–2	5–3	4–3	2–1	2–0	1–0	0–2	0–0	3–0	1–1	3–2	0–3	2–0	2–1	4–0	2–1	0–0	0–2
Burnley	1–0		1–1	2–1	2–1	2–0	3–0	1–1	1–1	0–1	2–1	2–0	1–1	0–2	2–1	2–0	4–0	3–0	5–1	0–0	3–3	1–1
Chelsea	2–1	2–1		1–1	1–1	1–1	0–0	4–1	3–1	1–0	1–1	1–1	1–0	4–2	3–0	2–6	2–2	1–0	2–0	0–3	1–3	1–0
Coventry City	1–1	5–1	2–1		0–2	0–3	0–1	0–1	1–1	0–3	2–0	1–4	1–3	2–2	3–0	2–1	2–0	2–2	2–3	4–2	1–1	1–0
Everton	2–0	2–0	2–1	3–1		5–1	0–1	2–1	1–0	1–1	3–1	1–0	1–0	1–0	1–0	4–2	3–0	3–0	0–1	2–1	2–0	4–2
Fulham	1–3	4–3	2–2	1–1	2–1		0–5	0–1	1–1	2–4	0–4	2–0	2–0	0–1	2–0	2–2	0–2	3–2	1–2	1–2	0–3	1–2
Leeds United	3–1	2–1	7–0	1–1	2–0	2–0		3–2	1–2	2–0	1–0	2–0	1–1	3–0	3–2	5–0	2–0	1–1	1–0	3–1	2–1	2–1
Leicester City	2–2	0–2	2–2	0–0	0–2	1–2	2–2		2–1	1–0	2–2	2–2	4–2	3–1	3–0	4–1	0–0	0–2	2–3	2–3	2–4	3–1
Liverpool	2–0	3–2	3–1	1–0	1–0	4–1	2–0	3–1		1–1	1–2	6–0	6–1	1–2	1–0	2–0	2–1	2–1	1–1	4–1	3–1	2–1
Manchester City	1–1	4–2	1–0	3–1	2–0	5–1	1–0	6–0	0–0		1–2	2–0	2–0	5–2	1–0	4–2	4–2	1–0	4–1	0–2	3–0	2–0
Manchester United	1–0	2–2	1–3	4–0	3–1	3–0	1–0	1–1	1–2	1–3		6–0	3–0	1–0	4–2	3–2	1–0	1–2	3–1	2–1	3–1	4–0
Newcastle United	2–1	1–0	5–1	3–2	1–0	2–1	1–1	0–0	1–1	3–4	2–2		0–0	1–0	4–0	3–0	1–1	2–1	1–3	2–2	1–0	2–0
Nottingham Forest	2–0	1–0	3–0	3–3	1–0	2–2	0–2	2–1	0–1	0–3	3–1	4–0		1–0	0–0	2–2	3–0	0–3	0–0	3–2	1–1	3–1
Sheffield United	2–4	1–0	1–2	2–0	0–1	2–3	1–0	0–0	1–1	0–3	0–3	2–1	1–3		0–1	4–1	1–0	1–2	3–2	1–1	1–2	1–1
Sheffield Wednesday	1–2	2–1	2–2	4–0	0–0	4–2	0–1	2–1	1–2	1–1	1–1	1–1	0–0	1–1		2–0	1–1	0–1	1–2	2–2	4–1	2–2
Southampton	2–0	2–2	3–5	0–0	3–2	2–1	1–1	1–5	1–0	3–2	2–2	0–0	2–1	3–3	2–0		1–2	3–2	1–2	4–0	0–0	1–1
Stoke City	0–1	0–2	0–1	3–3	1–0	0–1	3–2	3–2	2–1	3–0	2–4	2–1	1–3	1–1	0–1	3–2		2–1	2–1	0–0	2–0	0–2
Sunderland	2–0	2–2	2–3	1–1	1–0	3–0	2–2	0–2	1–1	1–0	1–1	3–3	1–0	2–1	0–2	0–3	3–1		0–1	0–0	1–5	2–0
Tottenham Hotspur	1–0	5–0	2–0	4–2	1–1	2–2	2–1	0–1	1–1	1–3	1–2	1–1	1–1	1–1	2–1	6–1	3–0	3–0		0–0	5–1	2–1
West Bromwich Albion	1–3	8–1	0–1	0–1	2–6	2–1	2–0	0–0	0–2	3–2	6–3	2–0	2–1	4–1	1–1	0–0	3–0	0–0	2–0		3–1	4–1
West Ham United	1–1	4–2	0–1	0–0	1–1	7–2	0–0	4–2	1–0	2–3	1–3	5–0	3–0	3–0	2–3	0–1	3–4	1–1	2–1	2–3		1–2
Wolverhampton Wanderers	3–2	3–2	3–0	2–0	1–3	3–2	2–0	1–3	1–1	0–0	2–3	2–2	6–1	1–3	2–3	2–0	3–4	2–1	2–1	3–3	1–2	

Updated to match(es) played on unknown. Source: Ian Laschke: Rothmans Book of Football League Records 1888–89 to 1978–79. Macdonald and Jane’s, London & Sydney, 1980.
Legend: Blue = home team win; Yellow = draw; Red = away team win.

=== Maps ===
Locations of the Football League First Division 1967–1968 teams
Locations of the Football League First Division London teams 1967–1968

== Second Division ==
Second Division
- Season: 1967–68
- Champions: Ipswich Town
- Promoted: Ipswich Town; Queens Park Rangers
- Relegated: Rotherham United; Plymouth Argyle
- Cup Winners' Cup: Cardiff City
- Matches: 462
- Goals: 1,303 (2.82 per match)
- Top goalscorer: John Hickton (24 goals)

Pos	Team	Pld	W	D	L	GF	GA	GAv	Pts	Qualification or relegation
1	Ipswich Town (C, P)	42	22	15	5	79	44	1.795	59	Promotion to the First Division
2	Queens Park Rangers (P)	42	25	8	9	67	36	1.861	58	Promotion to the First Division
3	Blackpool	42	24	10	8	71	43	1.651	58	
4	Birmingham City	42	19	14	9	83	51	1.627	52	
5	Portsmouth	42	18	13	11	68	55	1.236	49	
6	Middlesbrough	42	17	12	13	60	54	1.111	46	
7	Millwall	42	14	17	11	62	50	1.240	45	
8	Blackburn Rovers	42	16	11	15	56	49	1.143	43	
9	Norwich City	42	16	11	15	60	65	0.923	43	
10	Carlisle United	42	14	13	15	58	52	1.115	41	
11	Crystal Palace	42	14	11	17	56	56	1.000	39	
12	Bolton Wanderers	42	13	13	16	60	63	0.952	39	
13	Cardiff City	42	13	12	17	60	66	0.909	38	Qualification for the Cup Winners' Cup first round (Note: Cardiff City qualified for the European Cup Winners' Cup as the 1967–68 Welsh Cup winners.)
14	Huddersfield Town	42	13	12	17	46	61	0.754	38	
15	Charlton Athletic	42	12	13	17	63	68	0.926	37	
16	Aston Villa	42	15	7	20	54	64	0.844	37	
17	Hull City	42	12	13	17	58	73	0.795	37	
18	Derby County	42	13	10	19	71	78	0.910	36	
19	Bristol City	42	13	10	19	48	62	0.774	36	
20	Preston North End	42	12	11	19	43	65	0.662	35	
21	Rotherham United (R)	42	10	11	21	42	76	0.553	31	Relegation to the Third Division
22	Plymouth Argyle (R)	42	9	9	24	38	72	0.528	27	Relegation to the Third Division

Rules for classification: 1) Points; 2) Goal average; 3) Goals scored
(C) Champions; (P) Promoted; (R) Relegated

=== Results ===
Home \ Away	AST	BIR	BLB	BLP	BOL	BRI	CAR	CRL	CHA	CRY	DER	HUD	HUL	IPS	MID	MIL	NWC	PLY	POR	PNE	QPR	ROT
Aston Villa		2–4	1–2	3–2	1–1	2–4	2–1	1–0	4–1	0–1	2–1	0–0	2–3	2–2	0–1	3–1	4–2	0–1	1–0	1–0	1–2	3–1
Birmingham	2–1		1–1	1–2	4–0	4–1	0–0	1–3	4–0	1–0	3–1	6–1	6–2	0–0	6–1	2–3	0–0	2–2	2–2	3–0	2–0	4–1
Blackburn Rovers	2–1	1–2		2–1	2–1	2–0	1–1	1–0	3–2	2–1	3–0	0–0	2–0	2–1	3–0	2–0	0–0	1–1	2–2	0–1	0–1	3–1
Blackpool	1–0	1–0	2–1		1–1	1–1	3–1	1–1	2–0	2–0	1–1	2–0	3–1	0–0	3–0	1–4	0–2	2–0	2–0	4–1	0–1	1–1
Bolton Wanderers	2–3	1–1	2–1	1–2		1–0	1–1	2–3	2–0	2–2	5–3	3–1	6–1	1–2	2–0	1–1	2–0	1–2	1–2	0–0	1–1	0–2
Bristol City	0–0	3–1	0–0	2–4	1–1		1–1	1–0	0–2	2–1	1–0	2–3	3–3	1–1	0–0	0–2	0–2	2–0	3–0	4–1	0–2	0–1
Cardiff City	3–0	1–3	3–2	1–3	1–3	0–1		1–0	0–0	4–2	1–5	0–0	2–3	1–1	3–0	2–2	3–1	1–1	3–0	2–0	1–0	2–2
Carlisle United	1–2	1–1	1–0	1–3	3–0	0–0	1–3		0–0	3–0	1–1	2–1	1–1	4–1	2–2	1–1	2–2	2–0	1–1	4–1	3–1	4–1
Charlton Athletic	3–0	3–1	3–0	0–2	2–0	1–2	1–1	2–2		0–1	1–2	4–2	5–1	0–1	2–2	1–0	3–3	1–0	4–1	0–0	3–3	4–1
Crystal Palace	0–1	0–0	1–0	3–1	0–3	2–0	2–1	1–1	3–0		1–0	0–1	0–1	1–3	1–3	2–2	6–0	5–0	2–2	2–0	1–0	1–0
Derby County	3–1	2–2	2–2	1–3	2–1	3–1	3–4	0–1	3–2	1–1		1–0	1–2	2–3	2–4	3–3	1–1	1–0	0–1	1–2	4–0	4–1
Huddersfield Town	0–0	2–3	2–1	1–3	1–1	0–3	1–0	1–1	4–1	1–1	3–1		2–0	1–4	1–0	1–0	2–0	0–1	2–2	1–1	1–0	2–0
Hull City	3–0	0–1	1–1	0–1	1–2	4–2	1–2	1–0	1–1	1–1	3–0	1–1		1–1	0–2	1–1	0–2	0–2	1–1	1–1	2–0	2–1
Ipswich Town	2–1	2–1	1–1	1–1	1–1	5–0	4–2	3–1	3–2	2–2	4–0	2–0	2–0		1–2	2–1	0–0	1–1	1–2	4–0	2–2	2–0
Middlesbrough	1–1	1–1	0–0	0–0	1–2	2–1	2–3	4–0	1–1	3–0	2–2	3–2	2–1	0–2		0–1	2–0	5–0	1–0	5–0	3–1	1–1
Millwall	1–2	1–1	1–2	1–1	3–0	1–1	3–1	1–0	0–0	5–1	1–1	1–1	1–1	1–1	4–0		1–0	3–0	3–2	2–0	1–1	0–0
Norwich City	1–0	4–2	1–0	1–2	3–1	3–2	1–0	2–1	1–1	2–1	3–2	0–1	2–2	3–4	2–1	5–0		2–0	1–3	1–3	0–0	2–2
Plymouth Argyle	2–1	1–2	2–1	2–2	1–2	0–1	0–0	3–1	1–4	2–1	3–4	1–1	2–5	0–1	0–1	2–1	2–2		1–2	1–2	0–1	0–1
Portsmouth	2–2	1–2	2–1	3–1	3–0	2–0	3–1	2–1	4–0	2–2	3–2	3–1	3–0	1–2	2–0	0–0	3–0	0–0		2–1	1–1	1–1
Preston North End	2–1	0–0	3–5	0–2	1–1	0–1	3–0	0–2	4–1	0–0	1–1	3–1	3–2	1–1	0–0	0–1	1–0	2–0	3–1		0–2	2–2
Queens Park Rangers	3–0	2–0	3–1	2–0	1–0	3–1	1–0	1–0	2–1	2–1	0–1	3–0	1–1	1–0	1–1	3–1	2–0	4–1	2–0	2–0		6–0
Rotherham United	0–2	1–1	1–0	1–2	2–2	1–0	3–2	1–2	1–1	0–3	1–3	1–0	1–3	1–3	0–1	2–0	1–3	1–0	1–1	1–0	1–3	

Updated to match(es) played on unknown. Source: Ian Laschke: Rothmans Book of Football League Records 1888–89 to 1978–79. Macdonald and Jane’s, London & Sydney, 1980.
Legend: Blue = home team win; Yellow = draw; Red = away team win.

=== Maps ===
Locations of the Football League Second Division 1967–1968 teams
Locations of the Football League Second Division London teams 1967–1968

== Third Division ==
Football League Third Division
- Season: 1967–68
- Champions: Oxford United (1st title)
- Promoted: Bury
- Relegated: Colchester United; Grimsby Town; Peterborough United; Scunthorpe United
- Matches: 552
- Goals: 1,531 (2.77 per match)
- Top goalscorer: Don Rogers (Swindon Town), 25

Pos	Team	Pld	W	D	L	GF	GA	GAv	Pts	Promotion or relegation
1	Oxford United (C, P)	46	22	13	11	69	47	1.468	57	Promotion to the Second Division
2	Bury (P)	46	24	8	14	91	66	1.379	56	Promotion to the Second Division
3	Shrewsbury Town	46	20	15	11	61	49	1.245	55	
4	Torquay United	46	21	11	14	60	56	1.071	53	
5	Reading	46	21	9	16	70	60	1.167	51	
6	Watford	46	21	8	17	74	50	1.480	50	
7	Walsall	46	19	12	15	74	61	1.213	50	
8	Barrow	46	21	8	17	65	54	1.204	50	
9	Swindon Town	46	16	17	13	74	51	1.451	49	
10	Brighton & Hove Albion	46	16	16	14	57	55	1.036	48	
11	Gillingham	46	18	12	16	59	63	0.937	48	
12	Bournemouth & Boscombe Athletic	46	16	15	15	56	51	1.098	47	
13	Stockport County	46	19	9	18	70	75	0.933	47	
14	Southport	46	17	12	17	65	65	1.000	46	
15	Bristol Rovers	46	17	9	20	72	78	0.923	43	
16	Oldham Athletic	46	18	7	21	60	65	0.923	43	
17	Northampton Town	46	14	13	19	58	72	0.806	41	
18	Orient	46	12	17	17	46	62	0.742	41	
19	Tranmere Rovers	46	14	12	20	62	74	0.838	40	
20	Mansfield Town	46	12	13	21	51	67	0.761	37	
21	Grimsby Town (R)	46	14	9	23	52	69	0.754	37	Relegation to the Fourth Division
22	Colchester United (R)	46	9	15	22	50	87	0.575	33	Relegation to the Fourth Division
23	Scunthorpe United (R)	46	10	12	24	56	87	0.644	32	Relegation to the Fourth Division
24	Peterborough United (R)	46	20	10	16	79	67	1.179	31 (Note: Peterborough United were deducted 19 points for making irregular payments to players.)	Relegation to the Fourth Division

Source: rsssf.com
(C) Champions; (P) Promoted; (R) Relegated

=== Results ===
Home \ Away	BRW	B&BA	B&HA	BRR	BRY	COL	GIL	GRI	MAN	NOR	OLD	ORI	OXF	PET	REA	SCU	SHR	SOU	STP	SWI	TOR	TRA	WAL	WAT
Barrow		1–1	1–1	1–0	1–1	5–0	0–1	2–0	0–1	4–0	4–1	1–0	3–0	1–2	1–0	2–1	3–0	3–1	3–0	1–1	3–0	2–1	1–1	0–0
Bournemouth & Boscombe Athletic	3–0		2–2	3–1	1–0	1–2	4–0	1–0	3–0	0–2	0–0	0–0	2–1	3–3	2–0	1–0	1–1	4–1	1–0	2–1	1–1	3–0	1–1	0–1
Brighton & Hove Albion	1–1	2–3		1–1	1–0	0–0	3–0	3–1	3–0	0–2	0–1	1–1	0–0	1–1	1–1	3–1	3–0	1–0	3–0	0–0	0–1	2–0	1–0	1–0
Bristol Rovers	1–0	2–0	3–1		3–1	1–1	1–1	3–0	2–0	2–0	4–3	0–2	1–1	2–1	1–0	4–0	4–1	1–3	0–2	1–2	1–0	3–1	2–3	0–2
Bury	1–2	4–0	4–0	4–2		2–0	3–2	2–0	3–1	3–1	3–1	1–0	1–1	4–0	2–0	4–3	2–0	3–2	5–3	1–1	5–1	3–3	2–1	2–0
Colchester United	3–2	0–1	0–0	2–0	0–0		2–2	1–3	1–2	2–1	0–0	1–1	1–2	1–5	2–5	1–0	0–3	1–1	1–1	2–1	3–5	1–2	2–2	2–1
Gillingham	3–0	0–0	1–1	0–0	2–0	1–0		1–0	2–1	2–0	1–0	2–3	2–1	3–2	3–0	3–1	0–1	1–4	3–1	3–1	1–1	1–1	0–1	0–0
Grimsby Town	0–1	2–1	4–2	3–2	3–1	1–2	1–1		0–0	0–0	0–1	0–0	0–1	1–1	1–1	2–1	0–1	2–0	3–1	3–2	1–1	3–0	3–0	0–1
Mansfield Town	1–2	1–1	1–3	3–0	1–1	2–1	0–1	1–1		3–2	1–1	0–0	1–0	2–3	2–2	3–0	0–1	4–2	1–0	2–2	2–0	0–3	0–3	1–2
Northampton Town	3–0	1–0	2–2	4–5	0–1	2–2	1–1	3–0	1–1		1–2	2–1	1–1	3–1	1–2	1–0	2–2	1–1	4–1	2–0	1–0	0–1	3–0	1–1
Oldham Athletic	3–1	1–1	3–0	3–5	1–2	2–1	0–1	2–1	1–0	2–0		2–2	3–1	0–2	1–3	3–4	0–0	2–0	4–1	0–2	0–1	2–1	0–3	2–0
Orient	4–2	1–0	1–2	2–2	1–0	1–1	0–4	1–0	0–0	1–3	0–2		1–0	3–0	1–0	2–1	1–1	3–0	2–2	0–0	0–2	0–1	2–0	0–1
Oxford United	3–1	3–2	2–0	0–2	5–4	3–1	3–0	2–1	2–0	1–0	3–1	2–0		3–1	2–0	2–3	2–2	1–0	2–2	0–0	2–0	1–0	4–0	1–0
Peterborough United	0–1	2–0	2–3	4–1	0–2	3–1	3–0	3–2	2–0	4–0	2–1	3–2	1–1		2–3	1–1	0–1	1–0	2–0	1–1	2–0	1–1	2–1	5–1
Reading	3–0	1–0	1–0	2–1	3–4	1–0	3–1	3–0	2–1	0–0	0–1	4–2	1–1	0–1		2–1	0–0	1–1	3–0	2–1	4–0	3–0	2–2	2–0
Scunthorpe United	2–4	1–1	1–3	1–1	3–1	5–1	2–1	0–3	3–3	1–1	2–0	1–1	1–1	2–1	1–2		0–0	1–0	0–2	3–1	2–0	1–1	2–5	1–1
Shrewsbury Town	1–0	1–0	0–0	0–0	1–0	4–0	1–2	3–2	2–1	2–0	4–2	2–2	2–0	1–1	2–1	4–0		3–2	0–0	0–1	5–0	1–1	0–1	3–1
Southport	1–0	1–1	1–0	2–1	2–2	2–3	4–1	0–1	3–1	1–3	1–0	0–0	1–0	2–1	2–1	1–1	0–0		4–3	1–1	0–2	2–0	2–0	2–0
Stockport County	1–0	3–1	2–0	3–1	4–2	1–0	1–1	1–1	1–0	4–0	0–2	2–0	0–4	2–2	3–0	4–1	4–2	4–3		2–0	0–0	5–2	0–0	2–0
Swindon Town	0–1	4–0	2–1	4–1	2–3	1–1	2–2	5–0	1–1	4–0	0–0	4–0	1–1	0–0	5–1	2–0	0–0	3–3	2–0		1–0	3–1	3–0	2–0
Torquay United	0–2	2–1	1–1	2–0	3–0	3–0	2–1	1–0	0–2	0–0	2–1	1–1	1–1	3–1	2–1	2–1	3–0	2–2	3–0	1–1		1–0	4–1	1–0
Tranmere Rovers	0–0	0–0	2–2	3–3	2–0	4–2	2–1	1–2	1–1	2–2	1–0	3–0	1–1	0–1	1–2	2–0	4–1	0–2	2–1	3–2	2–3		2–0	1–2
Walsall	4–0	1–1	1–2	2–1	2–1	1–1	3–0	2–0	2–1	4–0	3–1	5–0	0–1	3–2	2–2	0–0	1–2	1–1	0–1	3–2	1–1	5–1		1–1
Watford	3–2	0–2	4–0	4–0	1–1	1–1	3–0	7–1	1–2	5–1	1–2	1–1	2–0	4–1	3–0	4–0	2–0	0–1	5–0	2–0	2–1	3–2	1–2	

Updated to match(es) played on unknown. Source: Ian Laschke: Rothmans Book of Football League Records 1888–89 to 1978–79. Macdonald and Jane’s, London & Sydney, 1980.
Legend: Blue = home team win; Yellow = draw; Red = away team win.

=== Maps ===
Locations of the Football League Third Division teams 1967–1968

== Fourth Division ==
Football League Fourth Division
- Season: 1967–68
- Champions: Luton Town (1st title)
- Promoted: Barnsley; Crewe Alexandra; Hartlepools United
- Failed re-election: none
- Matches: 552
- Goals: 1,485 (2.69 per match)
- Top goalscorer: Les Massie (Halifax Town), 25; Roy Chapman (Port Vale), 25

Pos	Team	Pld	W	D	L	GF	GA	GAv	Pts	Promotion or relegation
1	Luton Town (C, P)	46	27	12	7	87	44	1.977	66	Promotion to the Third Division
2	Barnsley (P)	46	24	13	9	68	46	1.478	61	Promotion to the Third Division
3	Hartlepools United (P)	46	25	10	11	60	46	1.304	60	Promotion to the Third Division
4	Crewe Alexandra (P)	46	20	18	8	74	49	1.510	58	Promotion to the Third Division
5	Bradford City	46	23	11	12	72	51	1.412	57	
6	Southend United	46	20	14	12	77	58	1.328	54	
7	Chesterfield	46	21	11	14	71	50	1.420	53	
8	Wrexham	46	20	13	13	72	53	1.358	53	
9	Aldershot	46	18	17	11	70	55	1.273	53	
10	Doncaster Rovers	46	18	15	13	66	56	1.179	51	
11	Halifax Town	46	15	16	15	52	49	1.061	46	
12	Newport County	46	16	13	17	58	63	0.921	45	
13	Lincoln City	46	17	9	20	71	68	1.044	43	
14	Brentford	46	18	7	21	61	64	0.953	43	
15	Swansea Town	46	16	10	20	63	77	0.818	42	
16	Darlington	46	12	17	17	47	53	0.887	41	
17	Notts County	46	15	11	20	53	79	0.671	41	
18	Port Vale	46	12	15	19	61	72	0.847	39 (Note: Due to financial irregularities, Port Vale were initially expelled from the league, but this punishment was later reduced to applying for re-election.)	Re-elected
19	Rochdale	46	12	14	20	51	72	0.708	38	
20	Exeter City	46	11	16	19	45	65	0.692	38	
21	York City	46	11	14	21	65	68	0.956	36	Re-elected
22	Chester	46	9	14	23	57	78	0.731	32	Re-elected
23	Workington	46	10	11	25	54	87	0.621	31	Re-elected
24	Bradford (Park Avenue)	46	4	15	27	30	82	0.366	23	Re-elected

Source: rsssf.com
Rules for classification: 1) points; 2) goal average; 3) number of goals scored.
(C) Champions; (P) Promoted

=== Results ===
Home \ Away	ALD	BAR	BRA	BPA	BRE	CHE	CHF	CRE	DAR	DON	EXE	HAL	HAR	LIN	LUT	NPC	NTC	PTV	ROC	STD	SWA	WRK	WRE	YOR
Aldershot		1–1	3–3	1–1	0–0	2–1	3–0	2–0	0–0	2–1	0–0	1–1	2–0	3–2	0–1	0–0	0–0	2–0	2–1	1–3	1–1	5–0	3–1	2–2
Barnsley	1–0		1–0	2–0	3–0	2–1	0–0	3–1	1–0	1–0	2–1	0–0	4–0	2–1	2–2	4–2	3–1	2–0	1–1	1–1	3–0	2–1	2–2	1–0
Bradford City	1–3	1–0		1–2	2–3	2–2	3–1	2–1	1–0	1–1	2–1	0–1	1–1	2–1	2–0	3–0	5–1	2–1	0–0	2–1	4–1	1–0	3–1	0–0
Bradford Park Avenue	1–1	1–1	1–2		1–0	0–2	2–1	1–2	1–2	1–1	0–1	0–1	0–1	1–5	2–1	0–2	1–4	2–2	0–0	0–1	1–2	1–1	0–1	1–1
Brentford	1–1	0–1	0–1	2–1		3–1	1–1	2–1	2–0	4–2	5–1	0–0	0–1	1–3	0–2	2–1	2–1	3–1	4–0	1–2	2–1	2–1	0–0	3–1
Chester	2–5	1–1	2–3	0–0	3–0		3–0	0–4	0–1	2–3	3–1	3–2	0–2	6–0	1–3	2–1	1–3	1–1	0–1	0–0	2–3	1–2	1–1	1–1
Chesterfield	1–2	2–3	2–1	2–0	2–1	3–1		4–1	3–1	2–0	1–1	0–0	3–1	2–0	0–0	1–2	4–0	3–0	0–2	3–1	3–1	0–0	3–1	3–1
Crewe Alexandra	1–1	3–3	1–1	4–0	2–0	2–0	1–1		1–1	2–2	2–0	5–1	2–1	2–1	2–1	1–1	4–0	1–1	2–1	1–0	2–0	3–2	0–0	0–0
Darlington	6–2	0–2	2–2	0–0	2–3	0–2	1–1	0–0		1–1	0–1	0–0	2–3	1–1	1–2	1–0	2–2	2–2	2–0	1–1	2–0	1–0	1–1	3–1
Doncaster Rovers	3–0	1–2	2–2	2–0	2–0	0–0	1–0	2–2	2–1		3–1	0–0	0–1	0–0	2–0	1–1	3–1	0–0	2–0	2–1	1–2	3–0	2–2	2–0
Exeter City	3–0	2–0	4–1	0–0	0–3	1–0	1–1	1–4	0–0	0–1		0–0	0–0	0–1	0–5	2–1	3–3	3–1	3–1	0–2	1–3	1–0	2–2	3–1
Halifax Town	2–2	1–1	1–0	1–0	3–0	2–2	0–2	0–1	2–0	2–3	1–1		3–0	1–0	0–1	4–1	0–1	0–1	2–0	1–2	2–2	2–1	2–2	2–1
Hartlepools United	1–0	2–1	1–0	2–0	2–0	0–0	2–1	1–1	1–0	0–0	3–1	0–0		1–1	2–1	2–0	3–1	2–2	1–1	0–1	2–0	2–1	3–0	1–0
Lincoln City	1–1	0–1	2–0	5–1	1–0	3–0	2–2	2–4	1–2	2–0	1–1	1–0	1–2		2–3	2–1	1–3	0–1	3–2	4–2	3–0	3–0	0–2	1–3
Luton Town	3–1	2–0	1–3	2–0	2–1	0–0	1–0	4–0	3–1	5–3	0–0	2–0	1–0	4–2		1–1	2–0	2–0	4–1	3–1	4–0	4–0	2–1	3–1
Newport County	0–2	3–0	0–3	4–0	2–2	1–1	0–3	0–0	1–0	2–1	1–1	0–1	2–0	0–1	1–1		1–0	1–1	1–1	2–0	3–0	2–1	3–2	2–1
Notts County	0–1	1–4	1–0	0–0	2–1	1–2	1–0	1–0	0–0	0–2	1–0	1–3	0–3	0–0	2–2	3–1		0–0	2–0	4–3	3–2	2–1	1–1	1–1
Port Vale	0–3	2–0	1–2	4–0	4–1	4–4	0–1	0–2	0–1	4–2	1–0	2–1	2–3	1–1	0–0	0–1	4–1		1–1	1–2	4–2	4–2	1–1	1–0
Rochdale	0–2	1–0	3–2	1–1	1–1	1–1	1–4	1–1	1–0	2–0	2–2	2–1	1–1	1–2	2–2	4–3	0–0	3–1		0–1	1–2	1–3	3–0	3–2
Southend United	1–1	4–1	1–1	2–1	1–0	5–1	1–1	0–0	2–2	1–2	1–0	2–2	2–1	2–1	3–0	2–2	0–1	1–1	3–1		1–0	7–0	3–1	0–1
Swansea Town	1–0	1–1	0–0	1–1	2–1	1–0	0–1	1–2	0–1	3–1	1–1	2–1	0–2	2–2	2–2	4–2	2–0	4–2	1–0	2–2		5–2	2–0	1–1
Workington	3–2	0–1	0–1	2–2	2–0	1–0	3–1	2–2	0–1	2–2	1–0	1–1	2–1	2–4	0–1	1–1	5–1	1–1	0–1	2–2	3–1		1–2	1–1
Wrexham	2–1	2–0	0–2	3–0	1–2	2–0	3–0	1–0	3–1	0–0	0–0	2–0	6–0	2–1	1–1	0–1	2–0	1–0	2–0	4–1	2–1	5–0		3–1
York City	2–3	1–1	0–1	6–2	0–1	4–1	0–2	1–1	1–1	1–2	4–0	1–2	0–2	1–0	1–1	0–1	4–2	5–1	4–1	2–2	2–1	1–1	3–1	

Updated to match(es) played on unknown. Source: Ian Laschke: Rothmans Book of Football League Records 1888–89 to 1978–79. Macdonald and Jane’s, London & Sydney, 1980.
Legend: Blue = home team win; Yellow = draw; Red = away team win.

=== Maps ===
Locations of the Football League Fourth Division teams 1967–1968

== Attendances ==
=== First Division ===
#	Football club	Home games	Average attendance
1	Manchester United	21	57,552
2	Everton FC	21	46,983
3	Liverpool FC	21	46,755
4	Tottenham Hotspur	21	42,608
5	Newcastle United	21	37,239
6	Manchester City	21	37,223
7	Leeds United	21	36,691
8	Chelsea FC	21	35,979
9	Wolverhampton Wanderers	21	35,017
10	Coventry City	21	34,705
11	Nottingham Forest	21	32,715
12	Arsenal FC	21	31,896
13	Sheffield Wednesday	21	31,461
14	Sunderland AFC	21	30,873
15	West Ham United	21	29,843
16	West Bromwich Albion	21	25,828
17	Southampton FC	21	24,665
18	Leicester City	21	24,528
19	Sheffield United	21	22,497
20	Fulham FC	21	22,203
21	Stoke City	21	21,949
22	Burnley FC	21	17,435

=== Second Division ===
#	Football club	Home games	Average attendance
1	Birmingham City	21	28,160
2	Portsmouth FC	21	22,988
3	Derby County	21	20,914
4	Aston Villa	21	19,785
5	Middlesbrough FC	21	18,906
6	Ipswich Town	21	18,627
7	Queens Park Rangers	21	18,457
8	Blackpool FC	21	17,178
9	Crystal Palace FC	21	17,141
10	Norwich City	21	16,286
11	Bristol City	21	15,935
12	Hull City	21	15,639
13	Preston North End	21	15,051
14	Charlton Athletic	21	13,945
15	Blackburn Rovers	21	13,531
16	Millwall FC	21	13,509
17	Cardiff City	21	13,301
18	Huddersfield Town	21	11,553
19	Bolton Wanderers	21	11,487
20	Plymouth Argyle	21	10,669
21	Carlisle United	21	10,414
22	Rotherham United	21	10,365

=== Third Division ===
#	Football club	Home games	Average attendance
1	Swindon Town	23	13,635
2	Brighton & Hove Albion	23	10,492
3	Walsall FC	23	9,119
4	Torquay United	23	9,096
5	Northampton Town	23	8,937
6	Watford FC	23	8,913
7	Oxford United	23	8,325
8	Bury FC	23	8,281
9	Stockport County	23	8,237
10	Reading FC	23	8,127
11	Bristol Rovers	23	8,105
12	Tranmere Rovers	23	7,403
13	Peterborough United	23	6,889
14	Shrewsbury Town	23	6,675
15	Barrow AFC	23	6,062
16	Bournemouth & Boscombe Athletic	23	5,983
17	Mansfield Town	23	5,948
18	Southport FC	23	5,903
19	Gillingham FC	23	5,770
20	Oldham Athletic	23	5,745
21	Orient	23	4,715
22	Grimsby Town	23	4,301
23	Colchester United	23	3,992
24	Scunthorpe United	23	3,845

=== Fourth Division ===
#	Football club	Home games	Average attendance
1	Luton Town	23	12,400
2	Barnsley FC	23	10,818
3	Southend United	23	10,619
4	Chesterfield FC	23	10,214
5	Doncaster Rovers	23	7,852
6	Bradford City	23	7,341
7	Wrexham AFC	23	6,729
8	Lincoln City	23	6,692
9	Brentford FC	23	6,211
10	Hartlepools United	23	6,190
11	Crewe Alexandra	23	5,917
12	Swansea Town	23	5,855
13	Notts County	23	5,641
14	Aldershot Town	23	5,618
15	Port Vale	23	4,886
16	York City	23	4,578
17	Halifax Town	23	4,502
18	Chester FC	23	4,415
19	Darlington FC	23	4,026
20	Exeter City	23	3,855
21	Bradford Park Avenue	23	3,609
22	Newport County	23	3,326
23	Rochdale AFC	23	2,292
24	Workington AFC	23	2,086

== See also ==
- 1967–68 in English football
