= USS Haddock =

USS Haddock has been the name of three United States Navy ships:

- USS Haddock, renamed USS K-1 (SS-32) while under construction, a submarine in commission from 1914 to 1923
- USS Haddock (SS-231), a submarine in commission from 1942 to 1947
- USS Haddock (SSN-621), a submarine in commission from 1967 to 1993
