= Albert Robinson (footballer, born 1948) =

English footballer

Personal information
- Full name: Albert Robinson
- Date of birth: 1 June 1948
- Place of birth: Chester, England
- Date of death: 1995 (aged 46–47)
- Place of death: Chester, England
- Position: Inside forward

Senior career*
Years	Team	Apps	(Gls)
1967–1969	Chester	5	(0)
- * Club domestic league appearances and goals

Albert Robinson (1 June 1948 – June 1995) was an English footballer, who played as an inside forward in the Football League for Chester.
