= 1968–69 Football League =

70th season of the Football League

The Football League
- Season: 1968–69
- Champions: Leeds United

The 1968–69 season was the 70th completed season of The Football League.

Leeds United won the League for the first time in their history, finishing six points ahead of Liverpool. Newly promoted Queens Park Rangers were relegated after finishing bottom along with Leicester City.

Jim Hunter scored 22 goals including his 100th career goal in February 1969 against Coventry City

Derby County were runaway winners of the Second Division and they were joined in promotion by runners-up Crystal Palace. Despite still boasting the talents of Johnny Haynes and George Cohen, Fulham finished bottom and were relegated. They were joined in the Third Division by perennial strugglers Bury

Watford won the Third Division title on goal average from Swindon Town and both teams were duly promoted. At the bottom end Northampton Town, Hartlepool, Crewe Alexandra and Oldham Athletic were all relegated.

The Fourth Division was won by Doncaster Rovers, who were promoted along with Halifax Town, Rochdale and Bradford City. No team failed re-election so no new members were admitted to the Football League.

== Final league tables and results ==
Beginning with the season 1894–95, clubs finishing level on points were separated according to goal average (goals scored divided by goals conceded), or more properly put, goal ratio. In case one or more teams had the same goal difference, this system favoured those teams who had scored fewer goals. The goal average system was eventually scrapped beginning with the 1976–77 season.

Since the Fourth Division was established in the 1958–59 season, the bottom four teams of that division have been required to apply for re-election.

== First Division ==
First Division
- Season: 1968–69
- Champions: Leeds United; 1st title
- Relegated: Leicester City; Queens Park Rangers
- European Cup: Leeds United
- European Cup Winners' Cup: Manchester City
- Inter-Cities Fairs Cup: Liverpool; Arsenal; Southampton; Newcastle United
- Matches: 462
- Goals: 1,213 (2.63 per match)
- Top goalscorer: Jimmy Greaves (27 goals)

Pos	Team	Pld	W	D	L	GF	GA	GAv	Pts	Qualification or relegation
1	Leeds United (C)	42	27	13	2	66	26	2.538	67	Qualification for the European Cup first round
2	Liverpool	42	25	11	6	63	24	2.625	61	Qualification for the Inter-Cities Fairs Cup first round
3	Everton	42	21	15	6	77	36	2.139	57	
4	Arsenal	42	22	12	8	56	27	2.074	56	Qualification for the Inter-Cities Fairs Cup first round (Note: Everton were ineligible to participate in the Inter-Cities Fairs Cup as Liverpool had already qualified. Under the rules of the cup, only one team per city could participate. Arsenal took their place as the highest-ranked team that had not already qualified for a European competition.)
5	Chelsea	42	20	10	12	73	53	1.377	50	
6	Tottenham Hotspur	42	14	17	11	61	51	1.196	45	
7	Southampton	42	16	13	13	57	48	1.188	45	Qualification for the Inter-Cities Fairs Cup first round (Note: Chelsea and Tottenham Hotspur were ineligible to participate in the Inter-Cities Fairs Cup as Arsenal had already qualified. Under the rules of the cup, only one team per city could participate. Southampton took their place as the highest-ranked team that had not already qualified for a European competition.)
8	West Ham United	42	13	18	11	66	50	1.320	44	
9	Newcastle United	42	15	14	13	61	55	1.109	44	Qualification for the Inter-Cities Fairs Cup first round (Note: Newcastle United qualified for the Inter-Cities Fairs Cup as the 1968-69 Inter-Cities Fairs Cup winners)
10	West Bromwich Albion	42	16	11	15	64	67	0.955	43	
11	Manchester United	42	15	12	15	57	53	1.075	42	
12	Ipswich Town	42	15	11	16	59	60	0.983	41	
13	Manchester City	42	15	10	17	64	55	1.164	40	Qualification for the European Cup Winners' Cup first round (Note: Manchester City qualified for the European Cup Winners' Cup as the 1968-69 FA Cup winners.)
14	Burnley	42	15	9	18	55	82	0.671	39	
15	Sheffield Wednesday	42	10	16	16	41	54	0.759	36	
16	Wolverhampton Wanderers	42	10	15	17	41	58	0.707	35	
17	Sunderland	42	11	12	19	43	67	0.642	34	
18	Nottingham Forest	42	10	13	19	45	57	0.789	33	
19	Stoke City	42	9	15	18	40	63	0.635	33	
20	Coventry City	42	10	11	21	46	64	0.719	31	
21	Leicester City (R)	42	9	12	21	39	68	0.574	30	Relegation to the Second Division
22	Queens Park Rangers (R)	42	4	10	28	39	95	0.411	18	Relegation to the Second Division

Source: World Football
Rules for classification: 1) Points; 2) Goal average; 3) Goals scored
(C) Champions; (R) Relegated

=== Results ===
Home \ Away	ARS	BUR	CHE	COV	EVE	IPS	LEE	LEI	LIV	MCI	MUN	NEW	NOT	QPR	SHW	SOU	STK	SUN	TOT	WBA	WHU	WOL
Arsenal		2–0	0–1	2–1	3–1	0–2	1–2	3–0	1–1	4–1	3–0	0–0	1–1	2–1	2–0	0–0	1–0	0–0	1–0	2–0	0–0	3–1
Burnley	0–1		2–1	1–1	1–2	1–0	5–1	2–1	0–4	2–1	1–0	1–0	3–1	2–2	2–0	3–1	1–1	1–2	2–2	2–2	3–1	1–1
Chelsea	2–1	2–3		2–1	1–1	3–1	1–1	3–0	1–2	2–0	3–2	1–1	1–1	2–1	1–0	2–3	1–0	5–1	2–2	3–1	1–1	1–1
Coventry City	0–1	4–1	0–1		2–2	0–2	0–1	1–0	0–0	1–1	2–1	2–1	1–1	5–0	3–0	1–1	1–1	3–1	1–2	4–2	1–2	0–1
Everton	1–0	3–0	1–2	3–0		2–2	0–0	7–1	0–0	2–0	0–0	1–1	2–1	4–0	3–0	1–0	2–1	2–0	0–2	4–0	1–0	4–0
Ipswich Town	1–2	2–0	1–3	0–0	2–2		2–3	2–1	0–2	2–1	1–0	1–4	2–3	3–0	2–0	0–0	3–1	1–0	0–1	4–1	2–2	1–0
Leeds United	2–0	6–1	1–0	3–0	2–1	2–0		2–0	1–0	1–0	2–1	2–1	1–0	4–1	2–0	3–2	2–0	1–1	0–0	0–0	2–0	2–1
Leicester City	0–0	0–2	1–4	1–1	1–1	1–3	1–1		1–2	3–0	2–1	2–1	2–2	2–0	1–1	3–1	0–0	2–1	1–0	0–2	1–1	2–0
Liverpool	1–1	1–1	2–1	2–0	1–1	4–0	0–0	4–0		2–1	2–0	2–1	0–2	2–0	1–0	1–0	2–1	4–1	1–0	1–0	2–0	1–0
Manchester City	1–1	7–0	4–1	4–2	1–3	1–1	3–1	2–0	1–0		0–0	1–0	3–3	3–1	0–1	1–1	3–1	1–0	4–0	5–1	1–1	3–2
Manchester United	0–0	2–0	0–4	1–0	2–1	0–0	0–0	3–2	1–0	0–1		3–1	3–1	8–1	1–0	1–2	1–1	4–1	3–1	2–1	1–1	2–0
Newcastle United	2–1	1–0	3–2	2–0	0–0	2–1	0–1	0–0	1–1	1–0	2–0		1–1	3–2	3–2	4–1	5–0	1–1	2–2	2–3	1–1	4–1
Nottingham Forest	0–2	2–2	1–2	0–0	1–0	1–2	0–2	0–0	0–1	1–0	0–1	2–4		1–0	0–0	1–0	3–3	1–0	0–2	3–0	0–1	0–0
Queens Park Rangers	0–1	0–2	0–4	0–1	0–1	2–1	0–1	1–1	1–2	1–1	2–3	1–1	2–1		3–2	1–1	2–1	2–2	1–1	0–4	1–1	0–1
Sheffield Wednesday	0–5	1–0	1–1	3–0	2–2	2–1	0–0	1–3	1–2	1–1	5–4	1–1	0–1	4–0		0–0	2–1	1–1	0–0	1–0	1–1	0–2
Southampton	1–2	5–1	5–0	1–0	2–5	2–2	1–3	1–0	2–0	3–0	2–0	0–0	1–1	3–2	1–1		2–0	1–0	2–1	2–0	2–2	2–1
Stoke City	1–3	1–3	2–0	0–3	0–0	2–1	1–5	1–0	0–0	1–0	0–0	1–0	3–1	1–1	1–1	1–0		2–1	1–1	1–1	0–2	4–1
Sunderland	0–0	2–0	3–2	3–0	1–3	3–0	0–1	2–0	0–2	0–4	1–1	1–1	3–1	0–0	0–0	1–0	4–1		0–0	0–1	2–1	2–0
Tottenham Hotspur	1–2	7–0	1–0	2–0	1–1	2–2	0–0	3–2	2–1	1–1	2–2	0–1	2–1	3–2	1–2	2–1	1–1	5–1		1–1	1–0	1–1
West Bromwich Albion	1–0	3–2	0–3	6–1	1–1	2–2	1–1	1–1	0–0	2–0	3–1	5–1	2–5	3–1	0–0	1–2	2–1	3–0	4–3		3–1	0–0
West Ham United	1–2	5–0	0–0	5–2	1–4	1–3	1–1	4–0	1–1	2–1	0–0	3–1	1–0	4–3	1–1	0–0	0–0	8–0	2–2	4–0		3–1
Wolverhampton Wanderers	0–0	1–1	1–1	1–1	1–2	1–1	0–0	1–0	0–6	3–1	2–2	5–0	1–0	3–1	0–3	0–0	1–1	1–1	2–0	0–1	2–0	

Updated to match(es) played on unknown. Source: Ian Laschke: Rothmans Book of Football League Records 1888–89 to 1978–79. Macdonald and Jane’s, London & Sydney, 1980.
Legend: Blue = home team win; Yellow = draw; Red = away team win.

=== Maps ===
Locations of the Football League First Division 1968–1969 teams
Locations of the Football League First Division London teams 1968–1969

== Second Division ==
Second Division
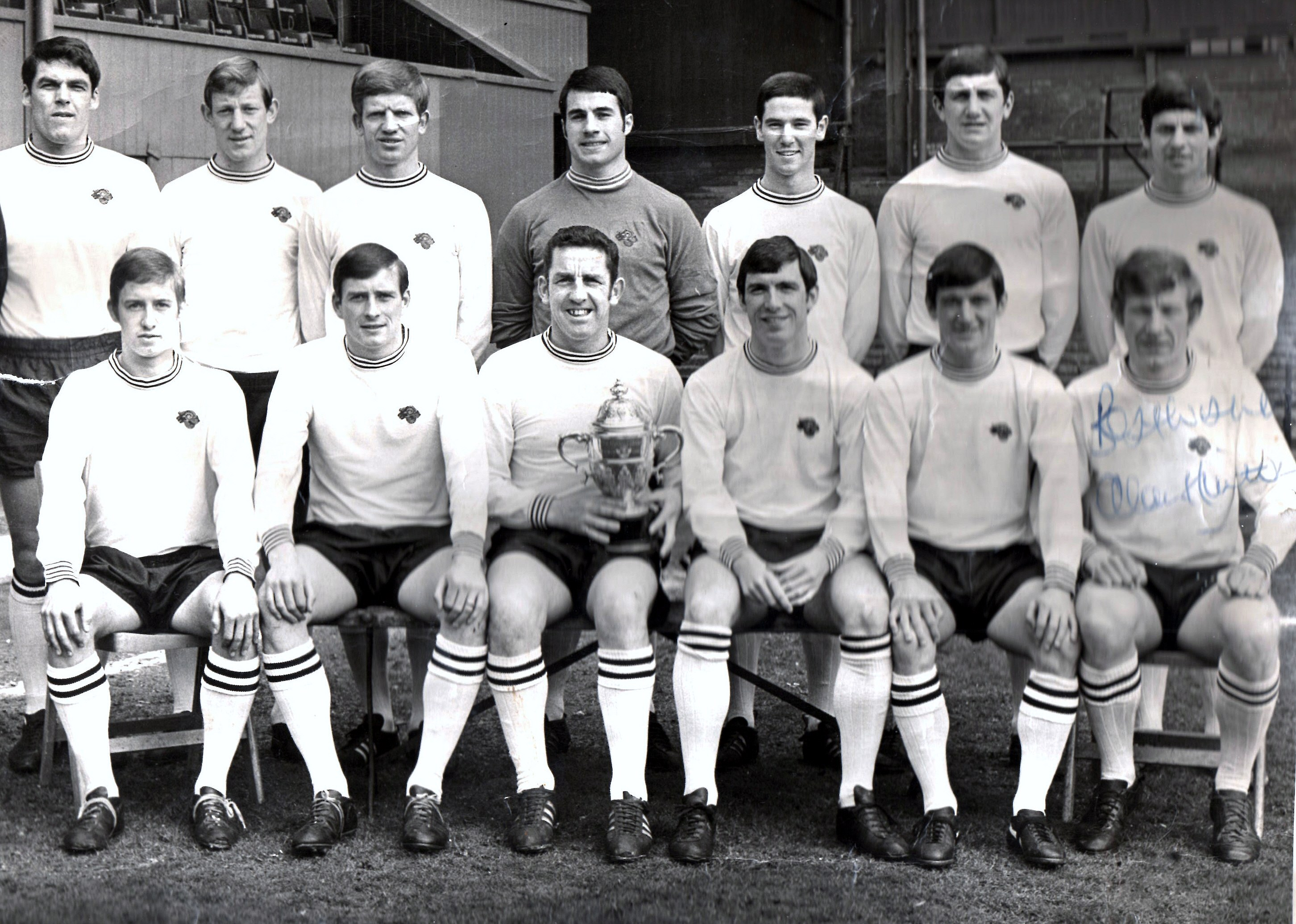
- The winning Derby County team with trophy
- Season: 1968–69
- Champions: Derby County
- Promoted: Derby County; Crystal Palace
- Relegated: Bury; Fulham
- Cup Winners' Cup: Cardiff City
- Matches: 462
- Goals: 1,185 (2.56 per match)
- Top goalscorer: John Toshack (22 goals)

Pos	Team	Pld	W	D	L	GF	GA	GAv	Pts	Qualification or relegation
1	Derby County (C, P)	42	26	11	5	65	32	2.031	63	Promotion to the First Division
2	Crystal Palace (P)	42	22	12	8	70	47	1.489	56	Promotion to the First Division
3	Charlton Athletic	42	18	14	10	61	52	1.173	50	
4	Middlesbrough	42	19	11	12	58	49	1.184	49	
5	Cardiff City	42	20	7	15	67	54	1.241	47	Qualification for the Cup Winners' Cup first round (Note: Cardiff City qualified for the European Cup Winners' Cup as the 1968–69 Welsh Cup winners.)
6	Huddersfield Town	42	17	12	13	53	46	1.152	46	
7	Birmingham City	42	18	8	16	73	59	1.237	44	
8	Blackpool	42	14	15	13	51	41	1.244	43	
9	Sheffield United	42	16	11	15	61	50	1.220	43	
10	Millwall	42	17	9	16	57	49	1.163	43	
11	Hull City	42	13	16	13	59	52	1.135	42	
12	Carlisle United	42	16	10	16	46	49	0.939	42	
13	Norwich City	42	15	10	17	53	56	0.946	40	
14	Preston North End	42	12	15	15	38	44	0.864	39	
15	Portsmouth	42	12	14	16	58	58	1.000	38	
16	Bristol City	42	11	16	15	46	53	0.868	38	
17	Bolton Wanderers	42	12	14	16	55	67	0.821	38	
18	Aston Villa	42	12	14	16	37	48	0.771	38	
19	Blackburn Rovers	42	13	11	18	52	63	0.825	37	
20	Oxford United	42	12	9	21	34	55	0.618	33	
21	Bury (R)	42	11	8	23	51	80	0.638	30	Relegation to the Third Division
22	Fulham (R)	42	7	11	24	40	81	0.494	25	Relegation to the Third Division

Rules for classification: 1) Points; 2) Goal average; 3) Goals scored
(C) Champions; (P) Promoted; (R) Relegated

=== Results ===
Home \ Away	AST	BIR	BLB	BLP	BOL	BRI	BRY	CAR	CRL	CHA	CRY	DER	FUL	HUD	HUL	MID	MIL	NWC	OXF	POR	PNE	SHU
Aston Villa		1–0	1–1	0–1	1–1	1–0	1–0	2–0	0–0	0–0	1–1	0–1	1–1	1–0	1–1	1–0	1–1	2–1	2–0	2–0	0–1	3–1
Birmingham	4–0		3–1	1–0	5–0	2–0	1–3	2–0	3–0	0–0	0–1	1–1	5–4	5–1	5–2	3–1	1–2	1–2	0–1	5–2	3–1	2–2
Blackburn Rovers	2–0	3–2		1–1	2–3	1–3	3–0	1–0	0–2	0–1	1–2	1–1	2–2	0–0	1–1	1–1	2–4	3–0	1–0	3–1	1–0	1–0
Blackpool	1–1	2–1	0–1		1–0	2–2	6–0	1–2	1–0	2–3	3–0	2–3	2–2	0–0	2–0	1–1	1–0	2–1	1–0	1–1	1–1	1–1
Bolton Wanderers	4–1	0–0	1–1	1–4		1–0	2–0	1–2	0–1	3–0	2–2	1–2	3–2	2–3	1–0	0–0	0–4	1–1	1–1	1–0	0–0	4–2
Bristol City	1–0	0–0	1–0	1–1	2–2		2–1	0–3	3–0	2–0	1–1	0–0	6–0	0–1	1–1	3–0	0–0	0–1	2–0	2–2	2–1	1–1
Bury	3–2	1–2	1–3	2–0	2–1	1–2		3–3	3–2	2–3	2–1	0–1	5–1	1–1	0–0	2–3	0–0	1–2	3–1	3–2	0–1	0–2
Cardiff City	1–1	4–0	2–1	1–0	0–2	3–0	2–0		2–1	0–1	0–4	1–1	0–2	0–2	3–0	2–0	2–0	3–1	5–0	2–2	1–0	4–1
Carlisle United	0–1	2–3	4–1	1–0	1–1	3–0	2–0	1–0		1–1	1–2	1–1	2–0	0–0	1–0	3–0	1–0	0–4	0–2	0–0	1–0	0–1
Charlton Athletic	1–1	3–1	4–0	0–0	2–2	0–0	2–2	4–1	1–1		1–1	2–0	5–3	1–0	1–1	2–0	3–4	2–1	1–0	2–1	0–1	2–1
Crystal Palace	4–2	3–2	1–0	1–2	2–1	2–1	1–0	3–1	5–0	3–3		1–2	3–2	2–1	2–0	0–0	4–2	2–0	1–1	3–1	1–2	1–1
Derby County	3–1	1–0	4–2	1–1	5–1	5–0	2–0	2–0	3–3	2–1	0–1		1–0	1–0	2–2	3–2	1–0	1–1	2–0	2–1	1–0	1–0
Fulham	1–1	2–0	1–1	0–0	0–2	1–0	0–0	1–5	0–2	0–1	1–0	0–1		4–3	0–0	0–3	2–0	1–3	0–1	2–2	2–1	2–2
Huddersfield Town	3–1	0–0	2–1	2–1	3–0	4–1	4–1	3–0	2–0	0–0	0–0	2–0	3–0		0–3	3–0	0–2	2–2	2–1	0–0	1–1	1–0
Hull City	1–0	1–2	1–3	2–2	1–0	1–1	3–0	3–3	1–2	5–2	2–0	1–0	4–0	3–0		3–0	2–0	0–1	0–0	2–2	1–1	1–1
Middlesbrough	0–0	3–1	2–0	2–1	0–0	4–1	2–3	0–0	1–0	1–0	4–0	0–0	2–0	1–1	5–3		1–1	0–0	2–0	1–0	2–1	3–1
Millwall	0–1	1–3	2–2	1–2	3–1	2–2	1–0	2–0	1–1	3–2	0–2	0–1	2–0	5–1	2–3	2–0		3–1	2–1	0–0	0–0	1–0
Norwich City	1–1	1–1	3–1	0–1	2–0	1–1	2–2	3–1	2–1	0–1	0–1	1–4	2–0	1–0	1–2	0–2	0–3		1–1	0–1	1–1	2–0
Oxford United	1–0	1–2	2–1	0–0	1–1	0–0	2–2	0–2	0–1	0–1	0–2	0–2	1–0	3–0	1–1	2–4	1–0	0–2		3–1	2–1	1–0
Portsmouth	2–0	0–0	0–1	1–0	2–2	1–1	1–2	1–3	2–1	4–1	3–3	0–1	3–1	1–2	1–0	3–0	3–0	5–2	3–0		1–1	2–1
Preston North End	1–0	4–1	1–1	1–0	1–4	1–0	3–0	0–1	2–2	1–1	0–0	0–0	0–0	1–0	1–0	1–2	0–1	1–3	2–1	0–0		2–2
Sheffield United	3–1	2–0	3–0	2–1	5–2	2–1	5–0	2–2	0–1	2–0	1–1	2–0	1–0	0–0	1–1	1–3	1–0	1–0	1–2	2–0	4–0	

Updated to match(es) played on unknown. Source: Ian Laschke: Rothmans Book of Football League Records 1888–89 to 1978–79. Macdonald and Jane's, London & Sydney, 1980.
Legend: Blue = home team win; Yellow = draw; Red = away team win.

=== Maps ===
Locations of the Football League Second Division 1968–1969 teams
Locations of the Football League Second Division London teams 1968–1969

== Third Division ==
Football League Third Division
- Season: 1968–69
- Champions: Watford (1st title)
- Promoted: Swindon Town
- Relegated: Crewe Alexandra; Hartlepool; Northampton Town; Oldham Athletic
- Matches: 552
- Goals: 1,426 (2.58 per match)
- Top goalscorer: Don Rogers (Swindon Town), 22

Pos	Team	Pld	W	D	L	GF	GA	GAv	Pts	Promotion or relegation
1	Watford (C, P)	46	27	10	9	74	34	2.176	64	Promotion to the Second Division
2	Swindon Town (P)	46	27	10	9	71	35	2.029	64	Promotion to the Second Division
3	Luton Town	46	25	11	10	74	38	1.947	61	
4	Bournemouth & Boscombe Athletic	46	21	9	16	60	45	1.333	51	
5	Plymouth Argyle	46	17	15	14	53	49	1.082	49	
6	Torquay United	46	18	12	16	54	46	1.174	48	
7	Tranmere Rovers	46	19	10	17	70	68	1.029	48	
8	Southport	46	17	13	16	71	64	1.109	47	
9	Stockport County	46	16	14	16	67	68	0.985	46	
10	Barnsley	46	16	14	16	58	63	0.921	46	
11	Rotherham United	46	16	13	17	56	50	1.120	45	
12	Brighton & Hove Albion	46	16	13	17	72	65	1.108	45	
13	Walsall	46	14	16	16	50	49	1.020	44	
14	Reading	46	15	13	18	67	66	1.015	43	
15	Mansfield Town	46	16	11	19	58	62	0.935	43	
16	Bristol Rovers	46	16	11	19	63	71	0.887	43	
17	Shrewsbury Town	46	16	11	19	51	67	0.761	43	
18	Orient	46	14	14	18	51	58	0.879	42	
19	Barrow	46	17	8	21	56	75	0.747	42	
20	Gillingham	46	13	15	18	54	63	0.857	41	
21	Northampton Town (R)	46	14	12	20	54	61	0.885	40	Relegation to the Fourth Division
22	Hartlepool (R)	46	10	19	17	40	70	0.571	39	Relegation to the Fourth Division
23	Crewe Alexandra (R)	46	13	9	24	52	76	0.684	35	Relegation to the Fourth Division
24	Oldham Athletic (R)	46	13	9	24	50	83	0.602	35	Relegation to the Fourth Division

Source: rsssf.com
Rules for classification: 1) points; 2) goal average; 3) number of goals scored.
(C) Champions; (P) Promoted; (R) Relegated

=== Results ===
Home \ Away	BAR	BRW	B&BA	B&HA	BRR	CRE	GIL	HAR	LUT	MAN	NOR	OLD	ORI	PLY	REA	ROT	SHR	SOU	STP	SWI	TOR	TRA	WAL	WAT
Barnsley		2–3	1–0	4–0	4–2	2–2	0–1	2–1	3–1	2–0	2–1	0–1	2–2	0–0	1–0	0–1	1–0	2–1	2–0	1–1	1–0	2–2	0–0	3–2
Barrow	0–1		0–2	1–1	3–0	2–0	2–1	1–2	0–0	3–0	0–2	2–1	3–1	1–0	0–0	2–0	2–1	0–0	3–3	0–3	2–0	1–0	1–1	1–4
Bournemouth & Boscombe Athletic	3–0	1–0		2–0	0–0	4–0	2–0	4–0	0–2	2–1	3–2	3–1	0–1	0–1	1–1	1–0	2–0	2–1	1–0	2–0	3–0	3–4	1–0	1–3
Brighton & Hove Albion	4–1	4–1	4–1		3–1	3–1	0–2	1–1	1–0	1–2	1–1	6–0	2–0	0–0	2–0	2–2	3–0	4–0	1–1	1–3	1–1	2–2	3–0	0–1
Bristol Rovers	4–2	4–2	3–2	1–1		1–0	5–1	2–1	0–0	6–2	2–1	1–0	0–1	1–1	1–3	1–1	1–2	2–1	2–0	2–1	1–1	0–2	0–1	1–1
Crewe Alexandra	1–4	1–1	0–2	1–0	6–1		4–2	1–0	2–0	2–1	2–2	3–0	2–0	2–1	1–2	1–0	0–1	3–3	1–1	1–2	2–1	2–3	0–1	2–3
Gillingham	1–1	2–0	0–0	5–0	0–2	1–0		2–2	1–3	1–1	2–0	2–0	2–2	1–0	2–2	2–0	4–1	0–0	0–0	2–0	0–0	1–1	4–0	0–5
Hartlepool	2–1	1–4	1–1	2–5	1–0	0–0	1–1		1–0	1–1	3–0	0–2	0–0	1–1	2–0	0–3	0–0	2–2	0–0	0–0	2–2	2–4	1–1	2–1
Luton Town	5–1	5–1	1–1	3–0	3–0	2–0	1–1	3–0		4–2	2–1	4–0	2–1	2–0	2–1	3–1	2–1	0–0	4–1	2–0	1–0	3–1	1–0	2–1
Mansfield Town	0–0	4–2	3–1	3–2	0–0	2–1	2–0	2–0	1–0		0–2	4–0	0–2	1–0	1–1	0–1	1–2	3–1	0–0	2–0	2–1	1–1	2–1	3–0
Northampton Town	3–1	4–0	1–3	1–1	2–2	0–1	0–1	0–0	0–2	0–0		1–1	4–1	1–1	4–2	1–0	3–4	1–0	1–1	2–6	1–1	2–1	2–1	2–0
Oldham Athletic	1–1	0–1	2–0	2–0	2–1	3–0	1–0	1–2	0–1	2–2	1–1		3–1	0–2	1–1	0–0	2–2	0–1	5–2	2–3	3–1	1–2	1–0	0–3
Orient	1–1	1–2	1–0	3–2	2–1	2–0	1–1	0–1	0–0	1–0	0–0	3–0		1–2	4–2	3–3	4–0	0–2	2–0	1–0	0–1	0–0	0–0	1–1
Plymouth Argyle	0–0	4–1	1–1	1–1	3–1	2–2	1–1	3–0	2–0	1–0	0–1	1–1	2–1		3–1	1–2	1–1	0–4	2–2	2–1	1–2	1–0	1–0	1–2
Reading	3–2	0–1	0–1	1–0	2–1	3–1	3–2	7–0	1–1	2–1	1–0	4–1	0–1	1–2		1–0	2–4	1–0	4–2	0–1	1–1	2–0	2–2	0–1
Rotherham United	0–0	3–1	1–1	1–1	3–2	3–0	1–0	1–1	2–2	3–0	0–1	1–2	3–1	0–1	4–1		1–0	3–1	4–1	1–1	1–0	4–1	0–1	0–2
Shrewsbury Town	0–0	1–0	1–0	1–2	1–0	1–1	1–1	1–1	3–1	1–1	1–0	0–1	1–0	1–0	3–3	1–0		5–1	2–1	1–1	1–0	0–1	0–1	1–1
Southport	1–0	1–0	2–1	2–3	3–0	4–0	4–2	3–0	1–1	3–2	2–0	3–1	2–2	2–0	1–1	0–0	5–0		5–0	1–1	2–2	2–2	2–1	1–1
Stockport County	1–1	4–1	0–1	3–1	0–1	2–1	5–0	1–0	2–0	1–1	1–0	0–0	5–2	2–3	2–2	3–1	4–3	3–0		2–1	1–2	1–0	2–2	4–2
Swindon Town	2–0	2–0	3–0	1–0	2–2	1–0	1–0	1–1	0–0	1–0	1–0	5–1	1–0	3–0	0–0	1–0	3–0	5–1	1–0		2–1	1–0	1–0	0–1
Torquay United	3–1	3–1	0–0	1–1	0–1	2–0	2–0	3–0	1–1	0–1	2–0	3–1	0–0	0–1	1–0	1–0	2–0	3–0	0–1	0–1		2–5	4–2	2–1
Tranmere Rovers	3–1	0–3	2–1	0–2	1–2	0–1	2–0	1–0	0–2	2–1	2–1	6–2	3–0	2–2	2–1	0–0	3–1	1–0	1–1	3–5	0–1		2–1	0–3
Walsall	3–0	1–1	0–0	4–0	2–2	1–1	2–1	1–2	2–0	3–1	0–1	2–1	2–1	1–1	2–2	0–0	2–0	3–0	2–0	0–2	0–1	1–1		0–0
Watford	1–2	4–0	1–0	1–0	1–0	4–0	2–1	0–0	1–0	2–1	3–0	2–0	0–0	1–0	1–0	5–1	2–0	1–0	0–1	0–0	0–0	3–1	0–0	

Updated to match(es) played on unknown. Source: Ian Laschke: Rothmans Book of Football League Records 1888–89 to 1978–79. Macdonald and Jane's, London & Sydney, 1980.
Legend: Blue = home team win; Yellow = draw; Red = away team win.
- With thirteen minutes remaining in the Barrow v Plymouth Argyle match on the 9th of November 1968, the score was 0-0. After Barrow took a corner-kick, the ball was cleared towards Barrow player George Mclean. His shot from outside the penalty area was going wide, but hit referee Ivan Robinson and went into the net. Robinson had no choice but to award the goal. Barrow held on to win 1-0.

=== Maps ===
Locations of the Football League Third Division teams 1968–1969
Locations of the Football League Third Division London teams 1968–1969

== Fourth Division ==
Football League Fourth Division
- Season: 1968–69
- Champions: Doncaster Rovers (2nd title)
- Promoted: Bradford City; Halifax Town; Rochdale
- Failed re-election: none
- Matches: 552
- Goals: 1,372 (2.49 per match)
- Top goalscorer: Gary Talbot (Chester), 22

Pos	Team	Pld	W	D	L	GF	GA	GAv	Pts	Promotion or relegation
1	Doncaster Rovers (C, P)	46	21	17	8	65	38	1.711	59	Promotion to the Third Division
2	Halifax Town (P)	46	20	17	9	53	37	1.432	57	Promotion to the Third Division
3	Rochdale (P)	46	18	20	8	68	35	1.943	56	Promotion to the Third Division
4	Bradford City (P)	46	18	20	8	65	46	1.413	56	Promotion to the Third Division
5	Darlington	46	17	18	11	62	45	1.378	52	
6	Colchester United	46	20	12	14	57	53	1.075	52	
7	Southend United	46	19	13	14	78	61	1.279	51	
8	Lincoln City	46	17	17	12	54	52	1.038	51	
9	Wrexham	46	18	14	14	61	52	1.173	50	
10	Swansea Town	46	19	11	16	58	54	1.074	49	
11	Brentford	46	18	12	16	64	65	0.985	48	
12	Workington	46	15	17	14	40	43	0.930	47	
13	Port Vale	46	16	14	16	46	46	1.000	46	
14	Chester	46	16	13	17	76	66	1.152	45	
15	Aldershot	46	19	7	20	66	66	1.000	45	
16	Scunthorpe United	46	18	8	20	61	60	1.017	44	
17	Exeter City	46	16	11	19	66	65	1.015	43	
18	Peterborough United	46	13	16	17	60	57	1.053	42	
19	Notts County	46	12	18	16	48	57	0.842	42	
20	Chesterfield	46	13	15	18	43	50	0.860	41	
21	York City	46	14	11	21	53	75	0.707	39	Re-elected
22	Newport County	46	11	14	21	49	74	0.662	36	Re-elected
23	Grimsby Town	46	9	15	22	47	69	0.681	33	Re-elected
24	Bradford (Park Avenue)	46	5	10	31	32	106	0.302	20	Re-elected

Source: rsssf.com
Rules for classification: 1) points; 2) goal average; 3) number of goals scored.
(C) Champions; (P) Promoted

=== Results ===
Home \ Away	ALD	BRA	BPA	BRE	CHE	CHF	COL	DAR	DON	EXE	GRI	HAL	LIN	NPC	NTC	PET	PTV	ROC	SCU	STD	SWA	WRK	WRE	YOR
Aldershot		2–1	4–1	1–2	4–0	2–0	1–2	0–0	1–2	2–0	3–1	0–2	0–1	4–0	0–0	1–4	3–0	0–0	3–2	2–1	5–2	0–1	2–1	2–0
Bradford City	1–1		1–0	3–0	2–0	2–1	1–1	0–0	1–1	1–0	1–1	1–1	2–0	1–1	1–1	2–1	2–2	1–1	3–0	3–2	1–0	0–1	1–3	5–0
Bradford Park Avenue	0–1	0–0		0–2	1–1	0–1	2–1	1–3	2–1	2–1	1–1	0–0	1–1	1–5	1–1	0–2	0–1	1–4	2–2	0–3	1–1	1–0	1–2	1–0
Brentford	2–4	2–1	3–0		2–1	1–0	4–0	0–1	1–0	0–1	4–2	1–1	2–2	1–1	0–0	2–0	3–1	1–1	2–1	1–1	2–1	0–3	1–1	5–1
Chester	3–1	0–0	4–1	2–2		2–0	5–1	1–2	2–1	0–1	0–1	2–2	2–0	4–0	3–1	2–3	2–0	2–1	0–2	1–2	3–0	0–2	1–1	2–0
Chesterfield	1–2	0–1	1–1	1–2	2–0		0–2	2–2	0–1	2–0	0–0	2–0	1–1	2–1	0–2	2–0	3–1	1–1	1–2	0–0	2–0	0–1	0–1	1–1
Colchester United	2–0	1–1	3–0	2–1	1–1	1–0		0–0	1–2	1–0	2–1	0–0	1–1	2–1	1–1	2–2	1–0	0–0	0–4	4–0	0–1	3–0	2–1	1–0
Darlington	1–0	1–3	2–0	3–1	2–2	1–3	1–1		0–0	1–2	0–0	0–1	5–0	1–0	3–2	3–3	1–0	0–0	0–1	2–3	3–0	6–2	1–0	3–2
Doncaster Rovers	7–0	1–1	4–1	5–0	4–3	0–0	1–0	0–1		3–1	2–1	0–0	0–2	2–2	0–0	1–0	2–0	2–0	4–3	2–0	0–0	0–0	0–0	2–1
Exeter City	0–0	2–3	4–2	2–2	2–2	3–0	1–1	2–0	0–0		2–2	2–1	3–0	2–0	0–0	0–1	3–1	2–2	3–1	1–2	0–1	1–0	5–3	5–0
Grimsby Town	0–2	1–5	2–0	0–2	0–0	1–2	2–4	1–1	1–3	1–2		0–1	1–1	3–0	2–0	2–2	1–1	2–0	0–1	0–0	1–2	0–1	1–1	3–0
Halifax Town	1–0	1–1	3–0	2–0	0–0	0–0	2–1	0–4	4–1	2–1	0–0		0–1	3–0	3–1	2–1	2–1	1–0	2–0	1–1	2–1	3–0	2–0	0–4
Lincoln City	2–1	2–0	3–2	1–0	2–0	2–2	0–3	2–1	1–1	3–2	3–0	0–0		1–0	5–0	1–1	0–1	0–0	1–2	2–1	0–1	4–1	0–0	3–0
Newport County	3–4	1–3	1–0	1–1	2–5	1–2	1–0	0–0	0–0	2–1	2–0	2–0	2–1		0–0	4–2	0–0	1–1	1–1	4–1	2–1	0–0	0–2	1–1
Notts County	0–2	0–2	5–0	0–2	3–2	2–1	2–0	0–0	1–1	3–1	2–1	1–2	0–0	3–1		2–1	0–0	1–1	1–0	2–2	0–3	0–0	5–0	0–0
Peterborough United	2–0	2–2	6–1	2–1	1–2	3–0	0–1	1–1	0–1	1–1	1–1	0–0	0–0	1–1	1–0		0–1	0–1	3–2	1–0	2–2	1–1	2–3	2–1
Port Vale	0–0	1–1	1–1	4–1	2–1	0–1	0–0	1–0	0–2	1–0	1–0	1–1	1–1	5–0	0–2	1–0		1–1	4–1	1–1	1–0	3–1	1–0	3–0
Rochdale	3–0	6–0	6–0	0–0	4–1	0–0	4–0	2–0	0–0	1–1	6–1	1–0	2–1	0–1	0–0	1–1	1–0		3–2	3–0	0–1	0–0	2–1	2–1
Scunthorpe United	4–1	1–0	1–0	1–1	2–2	0–1	2–3	0–0	0–2	2–1	1–2	0–1	0–0	1–0	2–1	1–2	0–1	0–0		4–1	3–1	0–1	1–0	2–1
Southend United	4–2	2–0	5–0	4–0	1–2	2–2	3–1	1–1	2–0	6–1	0–1	2–1	3–0	1–0	4–0	2–1	1–1	1–3	0–3		4–0	1–0	1–0	1–2
Swansea Town	2–2	0–2	3–0	2–3	0–5	0–0	2–0	1–1	0–1	2–0	1–1	1–0	5–0	3–2	3–0	0–0	1–0	3–0	2–0	2–2		0–0	0–0	2–1
Workington	1–0	0–0	3–1	1–0	0–0	1–1	0–1	1–2	1–1	3–0	2–0	1–1	1–1	3–2	1–1	1–0	0–0	1–2	1–1	0–0	0–3		0–0	2–0
Wrexham	2–0	1–1	3–0	2–0	1–1	1–1	0–3	2–1	3–1	2–2	2–0	2–2	0–1	4–0	3–2	0–0	2–0	3–2	0–1	3–3	2–0	1–0		2–1
York City	2–1	1–1	4–2	2–1	4–2	3–1	2–0	1–1	1–1	0–2	2–5	0–0	1–1	0–0	2–0	2–1	3–1	0–0	2–1	1–1	0–2	2–1	1–0	

Updated to match(es) played on unknown. Source: Ian Laschke: Rothmans Book of Football League Records 1888–89 to 1978–79. Macdonald and Jane's, London & Sydney, 1980.
Legend: Blue = home team win; Yellow = draw; Red = away team win.

=== Maps ===
Locations of the Football League Fourth Division teams 1968–1969
Locations of the Football League Fourth Division London teams 1968–1969

== Attendances ==
=== Division One ===
No.	Club	Average	±	Highest	Lowest
1	Manchester United	51,169	-11.1%	63,274	36,638
2	Liverpool FC	47,340	1.3%	54,496	40,449
3	Everton FC	45,958	-2.2%	63,938	36,035
4	Arsenal FC	38,423	20.5%	62,300	23,891
5	Chelsea FC	37,613	4.5%	60,436	17,639
6	Tottenham Hotspur FC	37,455	-12.1%	56,280	21,608
7	Leeds United FC	36,998	0.8%	48,145	24,494
8	Newcastle United FC	34,016	-8.7%	48,588	20,374
9	Manchester City FC	33,750	-9.3%	63,052	20,108
10	Coventry City FC	33,223	-4.3%	45,402	24,126
11	West Ham United FC	31,125	4.3%	41,546	24,903
12	Wolverhampton Wanderers FC	30,714	-12.3%	44,023	24,330
13	Leicester City FC	28,446	16.0%	41,130	21,086
14	Sheffield Wednesday FC	26,866	-14.6%	50,490	18,055
15	West Bromwich Albion FC	25,096	-2.8%	38,299	16,483
16	Sunderland AFC	24,949	-19.2%	49,428	15,575
17	Nottingham Forest FC	24,920	-23.8%	41,892	17,651
18	Ipswich Town FC	23,593	26.7%	30,837	17,780
19	Southampton FC	22,492	-8.8%	28,147	17,957
20	Queens Park Rangers FC	21,579	16.9%	31,138	12,489
21	Stoke City FC	18,984	-13.5%	30,562	8,833
22	Burnley FC	16,073	-7.8%	32,935	9,597

=== Division Two ===
No.	Club	Average	±	Highest	Lowest
1	Derby County FC	27,659	32.3%	34,976	21,737
2	Birmingham City FC	26,095	-7.3%	40,527	18,958
3	Aston Villa FC	24,656	24.6%	53,647	12,758
4	Middlesbrough FC	21,063	11.4%	29,824	10,417
5	Crystal Palace FC	19,874	15.9%	43,781	11,071
6	Portsmouth FC	19,163	-16.6%	28,642	13,960
7	Charlton Athletic FC	17,973	28.9%	32,768	9,270
8	Cardiff City FC	16,870	26.8%	26,210	10,809
9	Sheffield United FC	15,480	-31.2%	23,609	9,645
10	Bristol City FC	15,463	-3.0%	20,632	9,664
11	Millwall FC	15,388	13.9%	27,913	10,227
12	Blackpool FC	15,123	-12.0%	27,975	9,524
13	Fulham FC	14,221	-36.0%	23,132	7,154
14	Hull City AFC	14,216	-9.1%	24,307	8,702
15	Norwich City FC	13,750	-15.6%	19,431	7,861
16	Preston North End FC	13,215	-12.2%	20,711	8,224
17	Oxford United FC	11,636	39.8%	18,020	7,085
18	Blackburn Rovers FC	10,617	-21.5%	21,224	4,777
19	Bolton Wanderers FC	10,536	-8.3%	16,627	5,106
20	Huddersfield Town AFC	10,167	-12.0%	18,614	5,702
21	Carlisle United FC	9,212	-11.5%	13,920	5,546
22	Bury FC	7,765	-6.2%	15,361	3,063

=== Division Three ===
No.	Club	Average	±	Highest	Lowest
1	Swindon Town FC	18,055	32.4%	29,106	10,787
2	Luton Town FC	14,896	20.1%	25,523	10,971
3	Watford FC	13,576	52.3%	22,515	6,950
4	Brighton & Hove Albion FC	10,840	3.3%	16,229	6,395
5	Plymouth Argyle FC	10,599	-0.6%	20,810	6,603
6	Barnsley FC	9,459	-12.6%	14,160	5,631
7	Rotherham United FC	9,077	-12.4%	15,058	6,831
8	Torquay United FC	8,285	-8.9%	15,660	5,802
9	AFC Bournemouth	7,564	26.4%	12,113	3,621
10	Stockport County FC	7,173	-12.9%	13,246	2,569
11	Bristol Rovers FC	7,118	-12.2%	10,614	4,768
12	Mansfield Town FC	7,049	18.5%	13,291	4,635
13	Northampton Town FC	6,790	-24.0%	15,161	4,406
14	Reading FC	6,552	-19.4%	17,629	3,467
15	Tranmere Rovers	6,040	-18.4%	8,353	2,861
16	Walsall FC	5,867	-35.7%	10,654	4,412
17	Leyton Orient FC	5,658	20.0%	13,719	3,240
18	Shrewsbury Town FC	5,516	-17.4%	7,968	2,211
19	Gillingham FC	5,387	-6.6%	8,227	3,860
20	Crewe Alexandra FC	4,804	-18.8%	9,053	2,331
21	Barrow AFC	4,676	-22.9%	7,407	2,919
22	Hartlepool United FC	4,200	-32.1%	6,791	2,035
23	Southport FC	4,188	-29.1%	6,578	2,461
24	Oldham Athletic FC	3,862	-32.8%	6,967	2,073

=== Division Four ===
No.	Club	Average	±	Highest	Lowest
1	Southend United FC	10,559	-0.6%	13,052	7,684
2	Doncaster Rovers FC	10,211	30.0%	22,268	5,497
3	Lincoln City FC	7,912	18.2%	12,208	6,033
4	Bradford City AFC	7,214	-1.7%	12,441	3,568
5	Brentford FC	6,419	3.4%	9,806	3,361
6	Colchester United FC	6,273	57.2%	10,604	3,199
7	Darlington FC	6,164	53.1%	11,851	4,095
8	Aldershot Town FC	5,882	4.7%	9,280	4,001
9	Chester City FC	5,875	33.1%	13,943	2,468
10	Halifax Town AFC	5,670	26.0%	17,186	2,674
11	Swansea City AFC	5,660	-3.3%	11,879	1,984
12	Peterborough United FC	5,618	-18.5%	8,532	3,758
13	Wrexham AFC	5,604	-16.7%	13,935	3,048
14	Rochdale AFC	5,399	135.6%	12,806	2,038
15	Exeter City FC	5,371	39.3%	12,714	3,264
16	Chesterfield FC	5,063	-50.4%	9,756	2,404
17	Notts County FC	4,778	-15.3%	9,801	3,089
18	Port Vale FC	4,361	-10.7%	6,152	2,679
19	Grimsby Town FC	3,984	-7.4%	7,844	1,833
20	York City FC	3,883	-15.2%	5,559	2,462
21	Scunthorpe United FC	3,644	-5.2%	6,650	2,080
22	Bradford Park Avenue AFC	3,273	-9.3%	10,784	1,572
23	Newport County AFC	2,457	-26.1%	5,083	1,192
24	Workington AFC	2,370	13.6%	4,292	1,225

== See also ==
- 1968–69 in English football
