= 1967–68 Welsh Cup =

Tournament details
- Country: Wales

Final positions
- Champions: (Wales) Cardiff City
- Runners-up: (England) Hereford United

The 1967–68 FAW Welsh Cup is the 81st season of the annual knockout tournament for competitive football teams in Wales.

== Key ==
League name pointed after clubs name.

- CCL - Cheshire County League
- FL D2 - Football League Second Division
- FL D3 - Football League Third Division
- FL D4 - Football League Fourth Division
- SFL - Southern Football League
- WLN - Welsh League North
- W&DL - Wrexham & District Amateur League

== Fifth round ==
Ten winners from the Fourth round and six new clubs.

Tie no	Home	Score	Away
1	Chester (FL D4)	2–1	Bangor City (CCL)

== Sixth round ==
Tie no	Home	Score	Away
1	Brymbo Steelworks (W&DL)	0–8	Chester (FL D4)

== Semifinal ==
Tie no	Home	Score	Away
1	Chester (FL D4)	0–3	Cardiff City (FL D2)
2	Newport County (FL D4)	0–1	Hereford United (SFL)

== Final ==
Tie no	Home	Score	Away
1	Hereford United (SFL)	0–2	Cardiff City (FL D2)
1	Cardiff City (FL D2)	4–1	Hereford United (SFL)
