= Andy Haddock =

Scottish footballer

Personal information
- Full name: Andrew Edward Robinson Haddock
- Date of birth: 5 May 1946 (age 80)
- Place of birth: Edinburgh, Scotland
- Position: Winger

Senior career*
Years	Team	Apps	(Gls)
1963–1964	Chester	12	(0)
1964–1965	Crewe Alexandra	4	(0)
1965–1966	Falkirk	9	(0)
1966–1967	Rotherham United	4	(0)
1967	Chelmsford City		
1967–1968	Bradford Park Avenue	5	(0)
1968	Chester	10	(1)
1968-1969	Fleetwood	65	(12)
1969-????	Altrincham		
1974-1975	Fleetwood	65	(4)
- * Club domestic league appearances and goals

Andrew Edward Robinson Haddock (born 5 May 1946) is a Scottish former professional footballer who played as a winger in the Football League for Chester, Crewe Alexandra, Rotherham United and Bradford Park Avenue.
