= Eddie Rampling =

English footballer

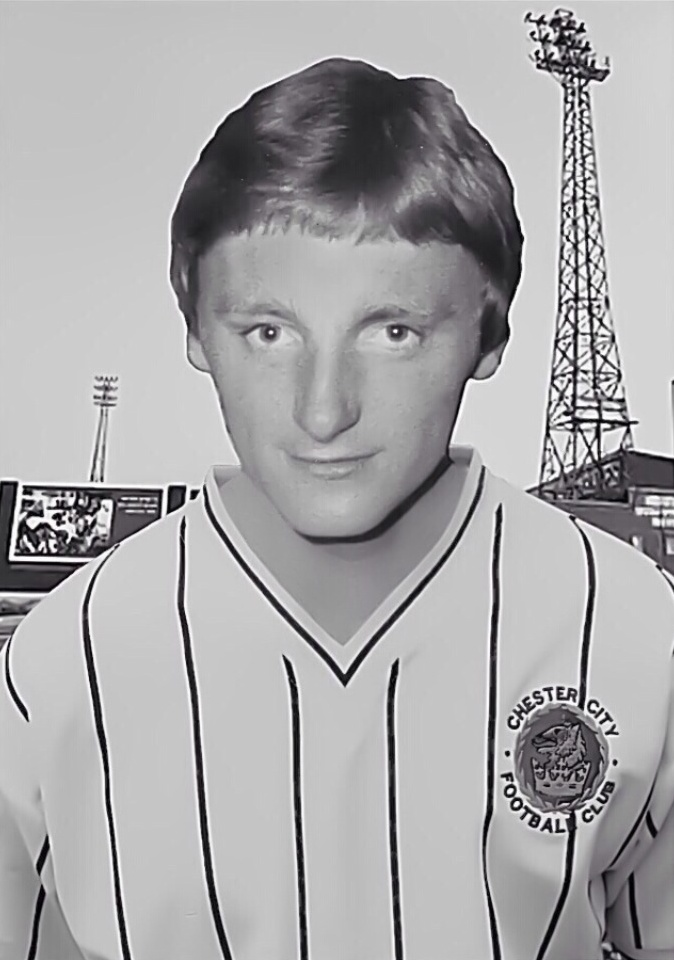
- Eddie Rampling, while with Chester

Personal information
- Date of birth: 17 February 1948 (age 78)
- Place of birth: Wigan, England
- Position: Winger

Senior career*
Years	Team	Apps	(Gls)
1967–1968	Chester	3	(0)
- Stalybridge Celtic
- * Club domestic league appearances and goals

Eddie Rampling (born 17 February 1948) is an English footballer, who played as a winger in the Football League for Chester.
