= David Hancox =

English footballer

Dave Hancox
Personal information
- Date of birth: 2 October 1947 (age 79)
- Place of birth: Conisbrough, England
- Position: Centre forward

Senior career*
Years	Team	Apps	(Gls)
1967–1968	Chester	19	(4)
- * Club domestic league appearances and goals

Dave Hancox (born 2 October 1947) was an English footballer, who played as a centre forward in the Football League for Chester.

== Professional career ==
Hancox was part of a 1967-68 Welsh Cup semi-finalist Chester team that fell to the 3rd to last position of the Football League, ahead of Workington and Bradford Park Avenue. The first season of play for Hancox resulted in four goals in nineteen appearances as his team won 9, drew 14, and lost 23, including Chester going the final nine games of the season without a win. It would also be the only season of play for Hancox for Chester.
