= 1967–68 Football League Cup =

1967–68 League Cup
Tournament details
- Country: England; Wales
- Teams: 90

Final positions
- Champions: Leeds United
- Runners-up: Arsenal

Tournament statistics
- Top goal scorer(s): Allan Clarke; Geoff Hurst (5 goals)

The 1967–68 Football League Cup was the eighth season of the Football League Cup, a knockout competition for England's top 92 football clubs; all League clubs competed except for Manchester United and Tottenham Hotspur. The competition ended with the final on 2 March 1968.

The final was contested by First Division teams Leeds United and Arsenal at Wembley Stadium in London. Leeds United's Terry Cooper scored the only goal of the game, giving Leeds a 1–0 victory.

== Calendar ==
Of the 90 teams, 38 received a bye to the second round (teams ranked 1st–39th in the 1966–67 Football League, excluding 2 teams that did not compete; and League Cup holders Queens Park Rangers) and the other 52 played in the first round. Semi-finals were two-legged.

| Round | Main date | Fixtures | | Clubs | New entries this round |
| Round | Main date | Original | Replays | Clubs | New entries this round |
|---|---|---|---|---|---|
| First round | 23 August 1967 | 26 | 8 | 90 → 64 | 52 (teams ranked 18th–22nd in Second Division; all Third and Fourth Division except for holders Queens Park Rangers) |
| Second round | 13 September 1967 | 32 | 4 | 64 → 32 | 38 (all First Division, except those teams that did not enter; teams ranked 1st–17th in Second Division; Queens Park Rangers as holders) |
| Third round | 11 October 1967 | 16 | 3 | 32 → 16 | none |
| Fourth round | 1 November 1967 | 8 | 2 | 16 → 8 | none |
| Fifth round | 29 November 1967 | 4 | 2 | 8 → 4 | none |
| Semi-finals | 17 January & 6/7 February 1968 | 4 | 0 | 4 → 2 | none |
| Final | 2 March 1968 | 1 | 0 | 2 → 1 | none |

== First round ==
=== Ties ===
| Home team | Score | Away team | Date |
|---|---|---|---|
| Aldershot | 2–3 | Cardiff City | 23 August 1967 |
| Barrow | 1–0 | Southport | 23 August 1967 |
| Bournemouth & Boscombe Athletic | 1–1 | Watford | 22 August 1967 |
| Brighton & Hove Albion | 4–0 | Colchester United | 23 August 1967 |
| Crewe Alexandra | 1–1 | Stockport County | 23 August 1967 |
| Darlington | 1–0 | York City | 23 August 1967 |
| Doncaster Rovers | 1–2 | Scunthorpe United | 23 August 1967 |
| Grimsby Town | 1–0 | Chesterfield | 23 August 1967 |
| Halifax Town | 5–0 | Bradford Park Avenue | 23 August 1967 |
| Hartlepools United | 2–0 | Bradford City | 23 August 1967 |
| Orient | 1–3 | Gillingham | 22 August 1967 |
| Luton Town | 1–1 | Charlton Athletic | 23 August 1967 |
| Mansfield Town | 2–3 | Lincoln City | 23 August 1967 |
| Middlesbrough | 4–1 | Barnsley | 22 August 1967 |
| Northampton Town | 3–2 | Peterborough United | 23 August 1967 |
| Notts County | 0–1 | Rotherham United | 23 August 1967 |
| Oxford United | 3–1 | Swansea Town | 23 August 1967 |
| Port Vale | 3–0 | Chester | 22 August 1967 |
| Reading | 3–0 | Bristol Rovers | 23 August 1967 |
| Rochdale | 0–1 | Bury | 23 August 1967 |
| Southend United | 1–0 | Brentford | 23 August 1967 |
| Swindon Town | 1–1 | Newport County | 22 August 1967 |
| Torquay United | 0–0 | Exeter City | 22 August 1967 |
| Tranmere Rovers | 2–1 | Wrexham | 23 August 1967 |
| Walsall | 4–2 | Shrewsbury Town | 22 August 1967 |
| Workington | 1–1 | Oldham Athletic | 23 August 1967 |

=== Replays ===
| Home team | Score | Away team | Date |
|---|---|---|---|
| Charlton Athletic | 1–2 | Luton Town | 30 August 1967 |
| Exeter City | 0–3 | Torquay United | 28 August 1967 |
| Newport County | 2–0 | Swindon Town | 29 August 1967 |
| Oldham Athletic | 1–1 | Workington | 29 August 1967 |
| Stockport County | 3–0 | Crewe Alexandra | 28 August 1967 |
| Watford | 0–0 | Bournemouth & Boscombe Athletic | 29 August 1967 |

=== 2nd replays ===
| Home team | Score | Away team | Date |
|---|---|---|---|
| Bournemouth & Boscombe Athletic | 1–2 | Watford | 6 September 1967 |
| Workington | 2–1 | Oldham Athletic | 31 August 1967 |

== Second round ==
=== Ties ===
| Home team | Score | Away team | Date |
|---|---|---|---|
| Barrow | 1–0 | Crystal Palace | 13 September 1967 |
| Blackburn Rovers | 3–1 | Brighton & Hove Albion | 13 September 1967 |
| Bristol City | 0–5 | Everton | 13 September 1967 |
| Burnley | 2–1 | Cardiff City | 12 September 1967 |
| Carlisle United | 0–2 | Workington | 13 September 1967 |
| Coventry City | 1–2 | Arsenal | 12 September 1967 |
| Derby County | 4–0 | Hartlepools United | 13 September 1967 |
| Fulham | 1–0 | Tranmere Rovers | 13 September 1967 |
| Gillingham | 2–2 | Torquay United | 13 September 1967 |
| Grimsby Town | 2–2 | Bury | 12 September 1967 |
| Huddersfield Town | 1–0 | Wolverhampton Wanderers | 12 September 1967 |
| Ipswich Town | 5–2 | Southampton | 12 September 1967 |
| Leeds United | 3–1 | Luton Town | 13 September 1967 |
| Lincoln City | 2–1 | Newcastle United | 13 September 1967 |
| Liverpool | 1–1 | Bolton Wanderers | 13 September 1967 |
| Manchester City | 4–0 | Leicester City | 13 September 1967 |
| Middlesbrough | 2–1 | Chelsea | 13 September 1967 |
| Millwall | 3–2 | Sheffield United | 13 September 1967 |
| Newport County | 0–1 | Blackpool | 12 September 1967 |
| Northampton Town | 3–1 | Aston Villa | 13 September 1967 |
| Norwich City | 1–1 | Rotherham United | 13 September 1967 |
| Oxford United | 2–1 | Preston North End | 13 September 1967 |
| Plymouth Argyle | 0–2 | Birmingham City | 13 September 1967 |
| Portsmouth | 3–1 | Port Vale | 13 September 1967 |
| Queens Park Rangers | 2–1 | Hull City | 12 September 1967 |
| Reading | 3–1 | West Bromwich Albion | 13 September 1967 |
| Scunthorpe United | 0–1 | Nottingham Forest | 13 September 1967 |
| Southend United | 1–2 | Darlington | 13 September 1967 |
| Stockport County | 3–5 | Sheffield Wednesday | 13 September 1967 |
| Stoke City | 2–0 | Watford | 13 September 1967 |
| Sunderland | 3–2 | Halifax Town | 13 September 1967 |
| Walsall | 1–5 | West Ham United | 13 September 1967 |

=== Replays ===
| Home team | Score | Away team | Date |
|---|---|---|---|
| Bolton Wanderers | 3–2 | Liverpool | 27 September 1967 |
| Bury | 2–0 | Grimsby Town | 19 September 1967 |
| Rotherham United | 0–2 | Norwich City | 19 September 1967 |
| Torquay United | 2–0 | Gillingham | 20 September 1967 |

== Third round ==
=== Ties ===
| Home team | Score | Away team | Date |
|---|---|---|---|
| Arsenal | 1–0 | Reading | 11 October 1967 |
| Blackburn Rovers | 3–2 | Middlesbrough | 11 October 1967 |
| Burnley | 3–0 | Nottingham Forest | 10 October 1967 |
| Darlington | 4–1 | Portsmouth | 11 October 1967 |
| Derby County | 3–1 | Birmingham City | 11 October 1967 |
| Everton | 2–3 | Sunderland | 11 October 1967 |
| Leeds United | 3–0 | Bury | 11 October 1967 |
| Lincoln City | 4–2 | Torquay United | 11 October 1967 |
| Manchester City | 1–1 | Blackpool | 11 October 1967 |
| Northampton Town | 0–0 | Millwall | 11 October 1967 |
| Norwich City | 0–1 | Huddersfield Town | 11 October 1967 |
| Queens Park Rangers | 5–1 | Oxford United | 10 October 1967 |
| Sheffield Wednesday | 3–1 | Barrow | 11 October 1967 |
| Stoke City | 2–1 | Ipswich Town | 11 October 1967 |
| West Ham United | 4–1 | Bolton Wanderers | 11 October 1967 |
| Workington | 2–2 | Fulham | 11 October 1967 |

=== Replays ===
| Home team | Score | Away team | Date |
|---|---|---|---|
| Blackpool | 0–2 | Manchester City | 18 October 1967 |
| Fulham | 6–2 | Workington | 16 October 1967 |
| Millwall | 5–1 | Northampton Town | 16 October 1967 |

== Fourth round ==
=== Ties ===
| Home team | Score | Away team | Date |
|---|---|---|---|
| Arsenal | 2–1 | Blackburn Rovers | 1 November 1967 |
| Darlington | 2–0 | Millwall | 31 October 1967 |
| Derby County | 1–1 | Lincoln City | 1 November 1967 |
| Fulham | 3–2 | Manchester City | 1 November 1967 |
| Huddersfield Town | 2–0 | West Ham United | 1 November 1967 |
| Queens Park Rangers | 1–2 | Burnley | 31 October 1967 |
| Sheffield Wednesday | 0–0 | Stoke City | 1 November 1967 |
| Sunderland | 0–2 | Leeds United | 15 November 1967 |

=== Replays ===
| Home team | Score | Away team | Date |
|---|---|---|---|
| Lincoln City | 0–3 | Derby County | 15 November 1967 |
| Stoke City | 2–1 | Sheffield Wednesday | 15 November 1967 |

== Fifth round ==
=== Ties ===
| Home team | Score | Away team | Date |
|---|---|---|---|
| Burnley | 3–3 | Arsenal | 29 November 1967 |
| Derby County | 5–4 | Darlington | 29 November 1967 |
| Fulham | 1–1 | Huddersfield Town | 29 November 1967 |
| Leeds United | 2–0 | Stoke City | 13 December 1967 |

=== Replays ===
| Home team | Score | Away team | Date |
|---|---|---|---|
| Arsenal | 2–1 | Burnley | 5 December 1967 |
| Huddersfield Town | 2–1 | Fulham | 12 December 1967 |

== Semi-finals ==
=== First leg ===
| Home team | Score | Away team | Date |
|---|---|---|---|
| Arsenal | 3–2 | Huddersfield Town | 17 January 1968 |
| Derby County | 0–1 | Leeds United | 17 January 1968 |

=== Second leg ===
| Home team | Score | Away team | Date | Agg |
|---|---|---|---|---|
| Huddersfield Town | 1–3 | Arsenal | 6 February 1968 | 3–6 |
| Leeds United | 3–2 | Derby County | 7 February 1968 | 4–2 |

== Final ==
The final was held at Wembley Stadium, London on 2 March 1968.

2 March 1968
15:00 BST

| Leeds United | 1–0 | Arsenal |
|---|---|---|
| Cooper 20' | Summary |

Wembley Stadium, London
Attendance: 97,877
