= 1966–67 Hartlepools United F.C. season =

Hartlepools United
1966–67 season
- Chairman: Ernest Ord
- Manager: Brian Clough
- Stadium: Victoria Ground
- Division Four: 8th
- FA Cup: First round
- League Cup: First round
Home colours	Away colours

During the 1966–67 English football season, Hartlepools United competed in the Division Three, the FA Cup and the League Cup.

== Season summary ==
In his second season as manager, Brian Clough and his assistant Peter Taylor transferred in several players to reinforce the squad including Notts County midfielders Somers and Sheridan, also arrived Full back Tony Bircumshaw bringing a solid defensive line through the campaign. However, on 15 November, chairman Ernie Ord prompted turmoil when he sacked Peter Taylor as he claimed he couldn't afford to pay him anymore. Clough refused to accept the dismissal so in turn, Ord sacked him as well. Finally, the club Board removed Ord as chairman and both Clough and Taylor kept their jobs.

In spite of the turmoil the squad had a good League season challenging the promotion spots almost the entire campaign until Spring and finished in a decent 8th place, only 7 points below the promotion. Meanwhile, in FA Cup the team was early eliminated by Shrewsbury Town in first round. In the League Cup it was Bradford Park Avenue which won the first series against Hartlepools in two legs.

== Squad ==
Note: Flags indicate national team as defined under FIFA eligibility rules; some limited exceptions apply. Players may hold more than one non-FIFA nationality.

Pos.	Nation	Player
GK	WAL	Kenny Simpkins
GK	ENG	Les Green
DF	ENG	Tony Bircumshaw
DF	ENG	Tony Parry
DF	ENG	Johnny Gill
DF	ENG	Brian Drysdale
DF	ENG	Stan Aston
DF	SCO	Bobby McLeod
DF	SCO	Brian Grant
MF	ENG	John Sheridan
MF	SCO	John McGovern

Pos.	Nation	Player
MF	ENG	Albert Broadbent
MF	ENG	Mick Somers
MF	ENG	Cliff Wright
MF	ENG	John Beresford
MF	ENG	John Joyce
FW	IRL	Amby Fogarty
FW	ENG	Terry Bell
FW	ENG	Joe Livingstone
FW	ENG	Jimmy Mulvaney
FW	ENG	Ernie Phythian

=== Transfers ===
In
Pos.	Name	from	Type
FW	Terry Bell	Nuneaton Borough	
DF	Tony Bircumshaw	Notts County	
MF	John Sheridan	Notts County	
MF	Mick Somers	Torquay United	

Out
Pos.	Name	To	Type
MF	Barry Ashworth	Tranmere Rovers	
MF	John Bates	Horden Colliery Welfare	
MF	Willie Bradley		
MF	Bobby Brass	Stockton F.C.	
MF	Hughie Hamilton	Scarborough F.C.	
DF	Eric Harrison	Barrow F.C.	
FW	Willie McPheat	Airdrieonians	
DF	Stan Storton	Tranmere Rovers	
FW	Peter Thompson	Boston United F.C.	

==== Winter ====
In
Pos.	Name	from	Type
DF	Stanley Aston	Burton Albion	
MF	Albert Broadbent	Bradford Park Avenue	

Out
Pos.	Name	To	Type

== Results ==
=== Division Four ===
==== League table ====
Pos	Team	Pld	W	D	L	GF	GA	GAv	Pts
6	Southend United	46	22	9	15	70	49	1.429	53
7	Wrexham	46	16	20	10	76	62	1.226	52
8	Hartlepools United	46	22	7	17	66	64	1.031	51
9	Brentford	46	18	13	15	58	56	1.036	49
10	Aldershot	46	18	12	16	72	57	1.263	48

Source: rsssf.com

==== Results by round ====
Round	1	2	3	4	5	6	7	8	9	10	11	12	13	14	15	16	17	18	19	20	21	22	23	24	25	26	27	28	29	30	31	32	33	34	35	36	37	38	39	40	41	42	43	44	45	46
Ground	A	H	A	A	H	H	A	H	A	A	H	H	H	A	H	A	A	H	H	A	A	H	H	A	A	H	A	A	H	A	H	H	A	H	A	H	H	A	A	H	H	A	A	H	H	A
Result	D	W	L	W	L	W	L	W	W	L	D	W	W	L	W	L	D	D	W	W	W	D	W	L	L	L	W	W	W	W	D	W	L	W	W	W	W	W	W	L	L	W	L	L	W	D
Position	12	9	9	10	15	17	17	14	10	14	13	10	8	11	11	12	12	13	10	8	6	7	4	6	8	8	8	7	8	7	7	7	7	7	6	6	7	6	6	7	8	7	7	7	7	7

Source: https://www.11v11.com/teams/hartlepool-united/tab/matches/season/1966/
A = Away; H = Home; W = Win; D = Draw; L = Loss; = Champions, Promoted to Division Three; = Promoted to Division Three; = Re-elected

==== Matches ====
- .- Source: https://www.11v11.com/teams/hartlepool-united/tab/matches/season/1967/

20 August 1966 1	Aldershot	1–1	Hartlepools Utd	Aldershot
	Jack Howarth 84'		25' Joe Livingstone	Stadium: Recreation Ground; Attendance: 3,590; Referee: P Rhodes

27 August 1966 2	Hartlepools United	2–1	Wrexham	Hartlepool
	Joe Livingstone 26'; Ernie Phythian 50'		54'Tony McLoughlin	Stadium: Victoria Park; Attendance: 5,664; Referee: H Williams

2 September 1966 3	Southend United	2–0	Hartlepools United	Southend-on-Sea
	Eddie Firmani 32'; Derek Woodley 79'			Stadium: Roots Hall; Attendance: 6,689; Referee: RF Prichard

5 September 1966 4	Hartlepools United	2–1	Barrow	Hartlepool
	Joe Livingstone; Amby Fogarty (pen.)		Billy McAdams	Stadium: Victoria Park; Attendance: 5,463; Referee: V James

10 September 1966 5	Hartlepools United	0–2	Tranmere Rovers	Hartlepool
			John Manning 86'; Steve 'Mandy' Hill 89'	Stadium: Victoria Park; Attendance: 5,903; Referee: GW Hill

17 September 1966 6	Bradford City	3–0	Hartlepools United	Bradford
	Ken Leek 25'; Derek Stokes 28'; Wilf Shergold 70'			Stadium: Valley Parade; Attendance: 3,727; Referee: TJ Hill

19 September 1966 7	Hartlepools Utd	0–1	Newport County	Hartlepool
			Dai Jones	Stadium: Victoria Park; Attendance: 4,096; Referee: JE Thacker

24 September 1966 8	Hartlepools United	3–1	Exeter City	Hartlepool
	Ernie Phythian 1', 76'; Jimmy Mulvaney 81'		70' Roger Smith	Stadium: Victoria Park; Attendance: 4,227; Referee: K Styles

26 September 1966 9	Barrow	2–3	Hartlepools United	Barrow-in-Furness
	George Smith; Billy McAdams		Jimmy Mulvaney, Ernie Phythian	Stadium: Holker Street; Attendance: 5,662; Referee: AWS Jones

1 October 1966 10	Hartlepools Utd	1–2	Crewe Alexandra	Hartlepool
	Ernie Phythian 47'		42' Alan Bradshaw; 67' Albert Harley	Stadium: Victoria Park; Attendance: 4,394; Referee: JE Carr

7 October 1966 11	York City	1–1	Hartlepools United	York
	Rowland Horrey		Jimmy Mulvaney	Stadium: Bootham Crescent; Attendance: 5,203; Referee: CI Robinson

15 October 1966 12	Hartlepools Utd	5–0	Lincoln City	Hartlepool
	Ernie Phythian 21'; Jimmy Mulvaney 27', 60'; Amby Fogarty 32' (pen.); Cliff Wright 75' (pen.)			Stadium: Victoria Park; Attendance: 3,987; Referee: DNH Payne

17 October 1966 13	Newport County	0–2	Hartlepools United	Newport
			John Sheridan; Ernie Phythian	Stadium: Somerton Park; Attendance: 5,463; Referee: ED Wallace

22 October 1966 14	Chesterfield	1–0	Hartlepools United	Chesterfield
	Ivan Hollett 27'			Stadium: Recreation Ground; Attendance: 5,275; Referee: LJ Hamer

29 October 1966 15	Hartlepools United	1–0	Stockport County	Hartlepool
	Ernie Phythian 82'			Stadium: Victoria Park; Attendance: 5,976; Referee: R Harper

5 November 1966 16	Rochdale	3–2	Hartlepools United	Rochdale
	Billy Russell 11', 18'; Bill Calder 23'		40' Jimmy Mulvaney; 80' Ernie Phythian 80'	Stadium: Spotland; Attendance: 2,005; Referee: VJ Batty

12 November 1966 17	Hartlepools United	1–1	Southport	Hartlepool
	Jimmy Mulvaney 79'		Jim Fryatt 72'	Stadium: Victoria Park; Attendance: 5,516; Referee: GC Kew

19 November 1966 18	Notts County	0–0	Hartlepools United	Nottingham
				Stadium: Meadow Lane; Attendance: 3,922; Referee: HP Hackney

3 December 1966 19	Bradford Park Avenue	1–2	Hartlepools United	Bradford
	Bobby Waddell 75'		52' Cliff Wright; 69' (o.g.) Ken Taylor	Stadium: Park Avenue; Attendance: 4,309; Referee: J Mitchell

10 December 1966 20	Hartlepools United	2–1	Port Vale	Hartlepool
	Cliff Wright 1'; Ernie Phythian 30'		65' Jimmy Hill	Stadium: Victoria Park; Attendance: 5,342; Referee: Dr DW Brady

17 December 1966 21	Hartlepools United	3–2	Aldershot	Hartlepool
	Jimmy Mulvaney 1', 82'Cliff Wright 17'		Peter Kearns 23'Jack Howarth 86'	Stadium: Victoria Park; Attendance: 5,159; Referee: WM Holian

26 December 1966 22	Hartlepools United	2–2	Brentford	Hartlepool
	Ernie Phythian (pen.); Joe Livingstone		John Docherty; Mel Scott	Stadium: Victoria Park; Attendance: 8,420; Referee: H Williams

27 December 1966 23	Brentford	1–2	Hartlepools United	Brentford
	John Docherty 52'		75', 85' Ernie Phythian	Stadium: Griffin Park; Attendance: 5,775; Referee: DW Smith

31 December 1966 24	Wrexham	4–1	Hartlepools United	Wrexham
	Dave Carrick 18'; Mickey Evans 50'; Don Weston 60' (pen.), 63'		6' Jimmy Mulvaney	Stadium: Racecourse Ground; Attendance: 12,005; Referee: CI Robinson

6 January 1967 25	Hartlepools Utd	1–2	Southend United	Hartlepool
	Ernie Phythian 89'		45+1' Tony Bentley; 70' John Baber	Stadium: Victoria Park; Attendance: 9,586; Referee: P Rhodes

13 January 1967 26	Tranmere Rovers	2–0	Hartlepools Utd	Birkenhead
	Barry Ashworth; Graham Williams			Stadium: Prenton Park; Attendance: 6,149; Referee: JE Carr

21 January 1967 27	Hartlepools Utd	1–0	Bradford City	Hartlepool
	Ernie Phythian 70'			Stadium: Victoria Park; Attendance: 6,109; Referee: RH Windle

30 January 1967 28	Hartlepools Utd	3–2	Chester	Hartlepool
	Cliff Wright; Ernie Phythian; Jimmy Mulvaney		Hugh Ryden; Les Jones	Stadium: Victoria Park; Attendance: 7,988; Referee: V James

4 February 1967 29	Exeter City	1–0	Hartlepools Utd	Exeter
	Jimmy Ryan 35'			Stadium: St James' Park; Attendance: 3,702; Referee: HG New

11 February 1967 30	Crewe Alexandra	1–2	Hartlepools Utd	Crewe
	Peter Gowans 85' (pen.)		49' Jimmy Mulvaney; 72'Cliff Wright	Stadium: Gresty Road; Attendance: 6,331; Referee: WJ Gow

18 February 1967 31	Hartlepools Utd	1–1	Barnsley	Hartlepool
	Terry Bell 33'		30' Johnny Evans	Stadium: Victoria Park; Attendance: 6,715; Referee: SJ Kayley

25 February 1967 32	Hartlepools Utd	4–2	York City	Hartlepool
	Jimmy Mulvaney 3', 61', 84'; Cliff Wright 52'		39' Graham Caulfield; 57' (pen.) Andy Provan	Stadium: Victoria Park; Attendance: 6,638; Referee: F Cowen

4 March 1967 33	Lincoln City	3–0	Hartlepools Utd	Lincoln
	Geoff Anderson 40', 86'; Clive Ford 45'			Stadium: Sincil Bank; Attendance: 4,667; Referee: NCH Burtenshaw

11 March 1967 34	Barnsley	1–2	Hartlepools Utd	Barnsley
	Bob Earnshaw 32'		22', 56' Ernie Phythian	Stadium: Oakwell; Attendance: 6,479; Referee: R Darlington

18 March 1967 35	Hartlepools Utd	3–2	Chesterfield	Hartlepool
	Jimmy Mulvaney 9'; Ernie Phythian 14', 35'		84' Peter Neale; 85' Peter Bishop	Stadium: Victoria Park; Attendance: 5,604; Referee: JE Thacker

24 March 1967 36	Hartlepools United	2–1	Luton Town	Hartlepool
	Jimmy Mulvaney; Ernie Phythian (pen.)		Graham French	Stadium: Victoria Park; Attendance: 8,442; Referee: DNH Payne

25 March 1967 37	Chester	1–0	Hartlepools Utd	Chester
	Mickey Metcalf 20'			Stadium: Sealand Road; Attendance: 3,126; Referee: J Finney

27 March 1967 38	Luton Town	0–2	Hartlepools Utd	Luton
			Tony Parry; John McGovern	Stadium: Kenilworth Road; Attendance: 7,370; Referee: WG Handley

1 April 1967 39	Hartlepools Utd	2–1	Rochdale	Hartlepool
	Micky Somers 71'; Albert Broadbent 83'		3' Reg Jenkins	Stadium: Victoria Park; Attendance: 5,952; Referee: H Williams

8 April 1967 40	Southport	3–1	Hartlepools Utd	Southport
	Eric Redrobe 1', 3'; Arthur Peat 45'		60' Albert Broadbent; 65' George Andrews	Stadium: Haig Avenue; Attendance: 4,277; Referee: RH Windle

11 April 1967 41	Halifax Town	2–1	Hartlepools United	Halifax
	Phil McCarthy 76'; Barry Hutchinson 80'		Albert Broadbent	Stadium: Shay Stadium; Attendance: 3,252; Referee: JA Warburton

15 April 1967 42	Hartlepools Utd	2–1	Notts County	Hartlepool
	Jimmy Mulvaney 48', 67'		31' Brian Bates	Stadium: Victoria Park; Attendance: 4,674; Referee: N Callender

21 April 1967 43	Stockport County	2–0	Hartlepools United	Stockport
	Johnny Price (pen.); Freddie Goodwin			Stadium: Edgeley Park; Attendance: 8,865; Referee: DNH Payne

24 April 1967 44	Hartlepools United	1–3	Halifax Town	Hartlepool
	Tony Parry 51'		60', 72', 86' John Parks	Stadium: Victoria Park; Attendance: 3,479; Referee: CM Cooke

29 April 1967 45	Hartlepools United	2–0	Bradford Park Avenue	Hartlepool
	Somers 15'; Phythian 60'			Stadium: Victoria Park; Attendance: 3,567; Referee: MA Fussey

6 May 1967 46	Port Vale	0–0	Hartlepools United	Burslem
				Stadium: Vale Park; Attendance: 3,178; Referee: WM Holian

=== League Cup ===
23 August 1966 League Cup Round 1	Bradford Park Avenue	2–2	Hartlepools United	Bradford
	Kevin Hector; Bobby Ham (pen.)		Ernie Phythian; Joe Livingstone	Stadium: Park Avenue; Attendance: 5,128; Referee: D Pritchard

31 August 1966 replay	Hartlepools United	1–2	Bradford Park Avenue	Hartlepool
	Ernie Phythian		Alec Gordon; Kevin Hector	Stadium: Victoria Park; Attendance: 4,835; Referee: LJ Hamer

=== FA Cup ===
26 November 1966 1	Shrewsbury Town	5–2	Hartlepools United	Shrewsbury
	Alan Turner 18', 58'; Frank Clarke 38'; John Manning 45', 47'		53' Ernie Phythian; 73' (pen.) Amby Fogarty	Stadium: Gay Meadow; Attendance: 6,515; Referee: R Darlington

== Statistics ==
=== Squad statistics ===
No.	Pos	Nat	Player	Total		Division Four		FA Cup		League Cup	
No.	Pos	Nat	Player	Apps	Goals	Apps	Goals	Apps	Goals	Apps	Goals
	GK	(Wales) WAL	Kenny Simpkins	34	-50	31	-41	1	-5	2	-4
	DF	(England) ENG	Tony Bircumshaw	35	0	34	0	1	0	0	0
	DF	(England) ENG	Tony Parry	26	2	23+1	2	0	0	2	0
	DF	(England) ENG	Johnny Gill	30	0	27	0	1	0	2	0
	DF	(England) ENG	Brian Drysdale	48	0	45	0	1	0	2	0
	MF	(England) ENG	John Sheridan	39	1	36	1	1	0	2	0
	MF	(Scotland) SCO	John McGovern	34	1	31+2	1	1	0	0	0
	MF	(England) ENG	Mick Somers	33	2	30+1	2	0	0	2	0
	MF	(England) ENG	Cliff Wright	41	7	37+1	7	1	0	2	0
	FW	(England) ENG	Jimmy Mulvaney	38	19	37	19	1	0	0	0
	FW	(England) ENG	Ernie Phythian	49	26	46	23	1	1	2	2
	GK	(England) ENG	Les Green	15	-23	15	-23	0	0	0	0
	FW	(Republic of Ireland) IRL	Amby Fogarty	24	3	21	2	1	1	2	0
	DF	(England) ENG	Stan Aston	19	0	19	0	0	0	0	0
	MF	(England) ENG	Albert Broadbent	15	3	15	3	0	0	0	0
	FW	(England) ENG	Terry Bell	19	1	14+4	1	1	0	0	0
	FW	(England) ENG	Joe Livingstone	16	5	14	4	0	0	2	1
	DF	(Scotland) SCO	Bobby McLeod	14	0	14	0	0	0	0	0
	DF	(Scotland) SCO	Brian Grant	15	0	13	0	0	0	2	0
	MF	(England) ENG	John Beresford	3	0	3	0	0	0	0	0
	MF	(England) ENG	John Joyce	1	0	1	0	0	0	0	0

- Source: https://www.11v11.com/teams/hartlepool-united/tab/players/season/1967/
