= 1965–66 Hartlepools United F.C. season =

Hartlepools United
1965–66 season
- Chairman: Ernest Ord
- Manager: Geoff Twentyman (until 27 October 1965); Brian Clough
- Stadium: Victoria Ground
- Division Four: 18th
- FA Cup: Fourth round
- League Cup: Second round
Home colours	Away colours

During the 1965–66 English football season, Hartlepools United competed in the Division Four, the FA Cup and the League Cup.

== Season summary ==
The club was a perennial struggler and had repeatedly had to apply for re-election to the Football League, having finished in the bottom two of the Fourth Division five times in the past six seasons. After sacking Geoff Twentyman (two years later he joined The Boot Room in Liverpool F.C.), the Board appointed the 30-year-old Brian Clough in October 1965 to his first managerial role. He accepted the job and immediately asked former Middlesbrough goalkeeper Peter Taylor (then managing non-League Burton Albion) to join him as his assistant. Also, Clough offered the trainer spot to Jimmy Gordon a former Middlesbrough assistant during his player stage in that team, however, Gordon rejected the offer and continued to work with Blackburn Rovers as its club trainer. Teenage midfielder John McGovern joined the club after Taylor scouted him at Central Park.

== Squad ==
Note: Flags indicate national team as defined under FIFA eligibility rules; some limited exceptions apply. Players may hold more than one non-FIFA nationality.

Pos.	Nation	Player
GK	WAL	Kenny Simpkins
GK	ENG	Les Green
GK	ENG	John Small
DF	ENG	Brian Drysdale
DF	ENG	Eric Harrison
DF	ENG	Stan Storton
DF	SCO	Brian Grant
DF	ENG	Johnny Gill
DF	NIR	Billy Marshall
DF	WAL	Alan Fox
DF	ENG	Tony Parry
DF	SCO	Bobby McLeod
MF	ENG	Barry Ashworth

Pos.	Nation	Player
MF	ENG	Cliff Wright
MF	IRL	Amby Fogarty
MF	SCO	Jimmy Cooper
MF	SCO	Willie Bradley
MF	ENG	John Bates
MF	ENG	Bobby Brass
MF	SCO	Hughie Hamilton
MF	SCO	John McGovern
FW	ENG	Jimmy Mulvaney
FW	ENG	Ernie Phythian
FW	ENG	Peter Thompson
FW	SCO	Willie McPheat
FW	ENG	Ally Murray
FW	ENG	Joe Livingstone

=== Transfers ===
In
Pos.	Name	from	Type
FW	Jimmy Mulvaney	Whitby Town	
DF	Bobby McLeod	Sunderland	
DF	Brian Drysdale	Lincoln City	
GK	Les Green	Burton Albion	
DF	Tony Parry	Burton Albion	
FW	Ernie Phythian	Wrexham A.F.C.	

Out
Pos.	Name	To	Type
MF	Neville Bannister	Rochdale F.C.	
FW	Bobby Entwistle		
FW	Terry Francis	Consett F.C.	
MF	Bobby Morrell	Thornley Colliery Welfare	

==== Winter ====
In
Pos.	Name	from	Type
DF	Johnny Gill	Mansfield Town	
DF	Brian Grant	Nottingham Forest	
FW	Joe Livingstone	Carlisle United	

Out
Pos.	Name	To	Type
MF	Jimmy Cooper	Addington F.C.	
DF	Alan Fox	Bradford City	
MF	Billy Marshall	Horden Colliery Welfare	

== Results ==
=== Division Four ===
==== League table ====
Pos	Team	Pld	W	D	L	GF	GA	GAv	Pts
16	Barnsley	46	15	10	21	74	78	0.949	40
17	Aldershot	46	15	10	21	75	84	0.893	40
18	Hartlepools United	46	16	8	22	63	75	0.840	40
19	Port Vale	46	15	9	22	48	59	0.814	39
20	Chesterfield	46	13	13	20	62	78	0.795	39

Source: rsssf.com

==== Results by round ====
Round	1	2	3	4	5	6	7	8	9	10	11	12	13	14	15	16	17	18	19	20	21	22	23	24	25	26	27	28	29	30	31	32	33	34	35	36	37	38	39	40	41	42	43	44	45	46
Ground	A	H	A	A	H	H	A	H	A	A	H	H	H	A	H	A	A	H	H	A	A	H	H	A	A	H	A	A	H	A	H	H	A	H	A	H	H	A	A	H	H	A	A	H	H	A
Result	W	L	D	L	L	W	W	L	L	L	D	L	L	W	W	L	L	L	L	D	D	L	W	D	L	W	L	W	W	L	L	D	W	L	W	W	W	L	L	W	L	L	W	W	D	D
Position	7	14	15	17	23	16	14	17	20	21	23	23	23	22	19	21	23	23	23	22	22	23	22	22	22	21	21	22	21	21	23	22	20	22	21	20	18	20	21	18	19	22	20	18	18	18

Source: https://www.11v11.com/teams/hartlepool-united/tab/matches/season/1966/
A = Away; H = Home; W = Win; D = Draw; L = Loss; = Champions, Promoted to Division Three; = Promoted to Division Three; = Re-elected

==== Matches ====
- .- Source: https://www.11v11.com/teams/hartlepool-united/tab/matches/season/1966/

21 August 1965 1	Hartlepools United	3–1	Southport

24 August 1965 2	Doncaster Rovers	4–0	Hartlepools United

28 August 1965 3	Wrexham	1–1	Hartlepools United

4 September 1965 4	Hartlepools United	2–3	Bradford Park Avenue

11September 1965 5	Aldershot	5–0	Hartlepools United

13 September 1965 6	Hartlepools United	2–0	Doncaster Rovers

18 September 1965 7	Hartlepools United	5–2	Newport County

25 September 1965 8	Torquay United	0–2	Hartlepools United

2 October 1965 9	Hartlepools United	1–2	Chesterfield

4 October 1965 10	Barrow	0–2	Hartlepools United

9 October 1965 11	Hartlepools United	0–0	Tranmere Rovers

16 October 1965 12	Colchester United	0–2	Hartlepools United

23 October 1965 13	Hartlepools United	1–2	Barnsley

30 October 1965 14	Bradford City	1–3	Hartlepools United	Bradford
	Cliff Wright 20'		35' Roy Ellam; 34', 84' Jimmy Mulvaney	Stadium: Valley Parade; Attendance: 2,373; Referee: LW Faulkner

6 November 1965 15	Hartlepools United	4–1	Crewe Alexandra	Hartlepool
	Ernie Phythian 15', 67'; Cliff Wright 33', 89'		63' Peter Kane	Stadium: Victoria Park; Attendance: 4,302; Referee: DNH Payne

20 November 1965 16	Hartlepools United	1–2	Halifax Town	Hartlepool
	Cliff Wright 42'		19' Dennis Fidler; 69' Bill Atkins	Stadium: Victoria Park; Attendance: 4,282; Referee: D Pritchard

27 November 1965 17	Chester	2–0	Hartlepools United	Chester
	Les Jones 41'; Elfed Morris 77'			Stadium: Sealand Road; Attendance: 6,547; Referee: L Callaghan

11 December 1965 18	Lincoln City	2–1	Hartlepools United	Lincoln
	Barry Hutchinson 58'; Roger Holmes 83'		39' Willie McPheat	Stadium: Sincil Bank; Attendance: 3,332; Referee: RL Johnson

18 December 1965 19	Hartlepools United	0–1	Colchester United	Hartlepool
			78' Ted Phillips	Stadium: Victoria Park; Attendance: 4,067; Referee: JE Carr

27 December 1965 20	Hartlepools United	1–1	Darlington	Hartlepool
	Peter Thompson		Kenny Allison	Stadium: Victoria Park; Attendance: 9,290; Referee: K Howley

28 December 1965 21	Darlington	1–1	Hartlepools United	Darlington
				Stadium: Feethams

1 January 1966 22	Tranmere Rovers	6–1	Hartlepools United	Birkenhead
	Bruce Crawford 1'; Alan A'Court 5', 37'; John Manning 62', 65'; Barry Dyson 74'		78' Cliff Wright	Stadium: Prenton Park; Attendance: 5,479; Referee: G McCabe

8 January 1966 23	Hartlepools United	2–0	Port Vale	Hartlepool
	Peter Thompson 60'; Ernie Phythian 89'			Stadium: Victoria Park; Attendance: 4,284; Referee: H Davey

15 January 1966 24	Barnsley	2–2	Hartlepools United	Barnsley
	George Kerr 58'; John Bettany 67'		9', 72' Peter Thompson	Stadium: Oakwell; Attendance: 3,471

29 January 1965 25	Southport	4–1	Hartlepools United	Southport
	Ron Smith 25'; Alan Spence 34', 57'; Stan Storton 52' (o.g.)		89' Cliff Wright	Stadium: Haig Avenue; Attendance: 4,983; Referee: Dr DW Brady

5 February 1965 26	Hartlepools United	4–2	Wrexham	Hartlepool
	Ernie Phythian 3', 58'; Amby Fogarty 65'; Peter Thompson 89'		8' Keith Webber; 15' Ian Hughes	Stadium: Victoria Park; Attendance: 3,959; Referee: H Richards

12 February 1965 27	Luton Town	2–1	Hartlepools United	Luton
	John O'Rourke 49', 56'		73' Peter Thompson	Stadium: Kenilworth Road; Attendance: 6,131; Referee: RV Spittle

26 February 1965 28	Hartlepools United	3–0	Aldershot	Hartlepool
	Ernie Phythian 40'; Amby Fogarty 69' (pen.); Peter Thompson 73'			Stadium: Victoria Park; Attendance: 4,410; Referee: V James

5 March 1965 29	Hartlepools United	2–0	Luton Town	Hartlepool
	Ernie Phythian 14'; Cliff Wright 58'			Stadium: Victoria Park; Attendance: 4,896; Referee: CM Cooke

12 March 1965 30	Newport County	3–0	Hartlepools United	Newport
	David Pugh 70'; Kenny Morgans 85'; Alfie Hale 89'			Stadium: Somerton Park; Attendance: 2,285; Referee: PG Brandwood

19 March 1965 31	Hartlepools United	0–2	Torquay United	Hartlepool
			13'Tommy Spratt; 82' Robin Stubbs	Stadium: Victoria Park; Attendance: 4,789; Referee: JW Bullough

21 March 1965 32	Port Vale	0–0	Hartlepools United	Burslem
				Stadium: Vale Park; Attendance: 4,908; Referee: SJ Kayley

25 March 1965 33	Chesterfield	1–3	Hartlepools United	Chesterfield
	Barry Whitehead 54' (pen.)		23' Jimmy Mulvaney; 60' Tony Parry; 77' Ernie Phythian	Stadium: Recreation Ground; Attendance: 2,653; Referee: J Parkinson

1 April 1965 34	Crewe Alexandra	3–1	Hartlepools United	Crewe
	Peter Gowans; Peter Kane,		Cliff Wright	Stadium: Gresty Road; Attendance: 3,148; Referee: ET Jennings

8 April 1965 35	Hartlepools United	2–1	Stockport County	Hartlepool
	Jimmy Mulvaney; Ernie Phythian		Peter Clark	Stadium: Victoria Park; Attendance: 4,393; Referee: E Crawford

9 April 1965 36	Hartlepools United	2–0	Notts County	Hartlepool
	Amby Fogarty 35'; Peter Thompson 56'			Stadium: Victoria Park; Attendance: 4,001; Referee: DNH Payne

11 April 1965 37	Stockport County	1–2	Hartlepools United	Stockport
	David Shawcross; Peter Thompson		Jimmy Mulvaney	Stadium: Edgeley Park; Attendance: 5,453; Referee: MA Fussey

15 April 1965 38	Halifax Town	1–0	Hartlepools United	Halifax
	Bill Atkins 8'			Stadium: Shay Stadium; Attendance: 1,533; Referee: LW Faulkner

19 April 1965 39	Bradford Park Avenue	4–1	Hartlepools United	Bradford
	Kevin Hector, Bobby Ham,		Johnny Gill	Stadium: Park Avenue; Attendance: 3,755; Referee: LJ Hamer

23 April 1965 40	Hartlepools United	2–0	Chester	Hartlepool
	Ernie Phythian 36'; Amby Fogarty 69'			Stadium: Victoria Park; Attendance: 4,138; Referee: R Harper

26 April 1965 41	Rochdale	3–1	Hartlepools United	Rochdale
	Bert Lister; Bob Stephenson,		Willie McPheat	Stadium: Spotland; Attendance: 1,964; Referee: V James

30 April 1965 42	Notts County	1–0	Hartlepools United	Nottingham
	Frank Kirkup 45'			Stadium: Meadow Lane; Attendance: 4,448; Referee: GD Roper

7 May 1965 43	Hartlepools United	3–1	Lincoln City	Hartlepool
	Jimmy Mulvaney 27', 82'; Amby Fogarty 34'		60' Joe Bonson	Stadium: Victoria Park; Attendance: 4,904; Referee: P Rhodes

9 May 1965 44	Hartlepools United	3–0	Barrow F.C.	Hartlepool
	Barry Ashworth; Cliff Wright; Jimmy Mulvaney			Stadium: Victoria Park; Attendance: 5,236; Referee: Dr DW Brady

16 May 1965 45	Hartlepools United	0–0	Rochdale	Hartlepool
				Stadium: Victoria Park; Attendance: 5,779; Referee: JE Thacker

21 May 1965 46	Hartlepools United	1–1	Bradford City	Hartlepool
	Joe Livingstone 36'		82' Derek Stokes	Stadium: Victoria Park; Attendance: 4,776; Referee: D Pritchard

=== FA Cup ===
==== Round one ====
13 November 1965 FA Cup (R1)	Hartlepools United	3–1	Workington	Hartlepool
	Willie McPheat 16', 63'; Bobby Brass 57'		9' Barry Lowes	Stadium: Victoria Park; Attendance: 7,466; Referee: SJ Kayley
Note: Workington is playing on Division Three.

==== Round Two ====
4 December 1965 FA Cup (R2)	Hartlepool United	2–0	Wrexham	Hartlepool
	Cliff Wright 56'; Jimmy Mulvaney 79'			Stadium: Victoria Park; Attendance: 6,897; Referee: LW Faulkner
Note: Wrexham is playing on Division Four.

==== Round Three ====
24 January 1966 FA Cup (R3)	Huddersfield Town	3–1	Hartlepools United	Huddersfield
	Johnny Quigley 60', 88'; Tony Leighton 85'		59' Peter Thompson '	Stadium: Leeds Road; Attendance: 24,505; Referee: W Crossley
Note: Huddersfield Town is playing on Division Two.

=== League Cup ===
==== Round one ====
1 September 1965 League Cup (R1)	Hartlepools United	1–0	Bradford City (Div 4)

==== Round Two ====
22 September 1965 League Cup	Leeds United	4–2	Hartlepools United	Leeds
	Cooper 30'; Johnson 59'; Belfitt 75'; Storrie 80'		55'Cooper; 79' Wright	Stadium: Elland Road; Attendance: 11,081; Referee: FM Nicholson

== Statistics ==
=== Squad statistics ===
No.	Pos	Nat	Player	Total		Football League Division Four		FA Cup		Football League Cup	
No.	Pos	Nat	Player	Apps	Goals	Apps	Goals	Apps	Goals	Apps	Goals
	GK	(Wales) WAL	Kenny Simpkins	30	-52	25	-44	3	-4	2	-4
	DF	(England) ENG	Eric Harrison	43	1	38	1	3	0	2	0
	DF	(England) ENG	Stan Storton	31	0	26	0	3	0	2	0
	DF	(Scotland) SCO	Brian Grant	23	0	22	0	1	0	0	0
	DF	(England) ENG	Brian Drysdale	38	0	34+1	0	3	0	0	0
	MF	(England) ENG	Barry Ashworth	38	3	34	3	2	0	2	0
	MF	(England) ENG	Cliff Wright	43	13	38+1	11	3	1	1	1
	MF	(Republic of Ireland) IRL	Amby Fogarty	44	5	39	5	3	0	2	0
	FW	(England) ENG	Jimmy Mulvaney	26	12	22+1	10	2	1	1	1
	FW	(England) ENG	Ernie Phythian	51	17	46	17	3	0	2	0
	FW	(England) ENG	Peter Thompson	33	11	31	10	1	1	1	0
	GK	(England) ENG	Les Green	19	-29	19	-29	0	0	0	0
	DF	(England) ENG	Johnny Gill	20	1	20	1	0	0	0	0
	MF	(Scotland) SCO	Jimmy Cooper	22	2	19	1	1	0	2	1
	MF	(England) ENG	Willie Bradley	19	0	17	0	1	0	1	0
	DF	(Northern Ireland) NIR	Billy Marshall	16	0	14	0	0	0	2	0
	FW	(Scotland) SCO	Willie McPheat	17	4	13+2	2	2	2	0	0
	DF	(Wales) WAL	Alan Fox	15	0	13	0	0	0	2	0
	MF	(England) ENG	John Bates	11	0	11	0	0	0	0	0
	MF	(England) ENG	Bobby Brass	13	1	10+1	0	2	1	0	0
	DF	(England) ENG	Tony Parry	8	1	7+1	1	0	0	0	0
	MF	(England) ENG	Hughie Hamilton	4	0	3+1	0	0	0	0	0
	GK	(England) ENG	John Small	2	-2	2	-2	0	0	0	0
	FW	(England) ENG	Joe Livingstone	1	1	1	1	0	0	0	0
	MF	(Scotland) SCO	John McGovern	1	0	1	0	0	0	0	0
	DF	(England) ENG	Bobby McLeod	1	0	1	0	0	0	0	0
	FW	(England) ENG	Ally Murray	0	0	0	0	0	0	0	0

- Source: https://www.11v11.com/teams/hartlepool-united/tab/players/season/1966/
