= 1966–67 in English football =

Football in England
- Season: 1966–67

Men's football
- First Division: Manchester United
- Second Division: Coventry City
- Third Division: Queens Park Rangers
- Fourth Division: Stockport County
- FA Cup: Tottenham Hotspur
- League Cup: Queens Park Rangers
- Charity Shield: Liverpool

The 1966–67 season was the 87th season of competitive football in England.

== Events ==
Queens Park Rangers won the Football League Cup on the first occasion it was played at Wembley, coming from 2-0 down at half-time to beat West Bromwich Albion 3-2.

Peter Osgood broke his leg playing for Chelsea at Blackpool in a Football League Cup Tie on 5 October. It kept him out of football for the rest of the season.

Northampton Town became the first team to be relegated in successive seasons from the top tier (in which they have spent only one season) to the third tier since Bradford Park Avenue in 1921 and 1922. This was however to happen eight further times in the next eighteen seasons, including two cases (Bristol City and Wolverhampton Wanderers) who were relegated in three successive seasons.

== Deaths ==
- 3 September – John Nicholson, 29, Doncaster Rovers midfielder (car crash).

== Debuts ==
10 September 1966: Colin Todd, 17-year-old midfielder, makes his debut for Sunderland against Chelsea in the First Division.

== Retirements ==
- Kenny Morgans, 28-year-old Newport County winger, who began his career with Manchester United and was one of the nine players who survived the Munich air disaster in 1958.
- Dennis Viollet, 34-year-old Stoke City forward, previously with Manchester United (scoring 179 goals between 1952 and 1962 and winning two league title medals) and another survivor of the Munich air disaster.
- Noel Cantwell, 35-year-old Manchester United and Ireland international full-back, joined the club in 1960 from West Ham United and was captain of the 1963 FA Cup winning side.

== Honours ==
Competition	Winner	Runner-up
First Division	Manchester United (7*)	Nottingham Forest
Second Division	Coventry City	Wolverhampton Wanderers
Third Division	Queens Park Rangers	Middlesbrough
Fourth Division	Stockport County	Southport
FA Cup	Tottenham Hotspur (5)	Chelsea
League Cup	Queens Park Rangers (1)	West Bromwich Albion
Charity Shield	Liverpool	Everton
Home Championship	Scotland	England

== Football League ==
=== First Division ===
Manchester United clinched their second league title in three seasons, finishing four points ahead of Nottingham Forest and FA Cup winners Tottenham. Leeds United and Liverpool completed the top five. A 6-1 signature victory at West Ham United on the penultimate weekend of the season, with the fabled triumvirate of Best, Law and Charlton all on the scoresheet, confirmed what was Matt Busby’s (the Manchester United Manager) fifth and final top flight league title. Manchester United were formally presented with the league title trophy a week later, after their final match of the season (a 0-0 draw at home to Stoke City). It was to be a further 26 years before Manchester United returned to the top of English football, winning the inaugural Premier League title in 1993.

Blackpool and Aston Villa dropped into the Second Division.

Pos	Team	Pld	W	D	L	GF	GA	GAv	Pts	Qualification or relegation
1	Manchester United (C)	42	24	12	6	84	45	1.867	60	Qualification for the European Cup first round
2	Nottingham Forest	42	23	10	9	64	41	1.561	56	Qualification for the Inter-Cities Fairs Cup first round
3	Tottenham Hotspur	42	24	8	10	71	48	1.479	56	Qualification for the European Cup Winners' Cup first round (Note: Tottenham Hotspur qualified for the European Cup Winners' Cup as the 1966–67 FA Cup winners.)
4	Leeds United	42	22	11	9	62	42	1.476	55	Qualification for the Inter-Cities Fairs Cup first round
5	Liverpool	42	19	13	10	64	47	1.362	51	Qualification for the Inter-Cities Fairs Cup first round
6	Everton	42	19	10	13	65	46	1.413	48	
7	Arsenal	42	16	14	12	58	47	1.234	46	
8	Leicester City	42	18	8	16	78	71	1.099	44	
9	Chelsea	42	15	14	13	67	62	1.081	44	
10	Sheffield United	42	16	10	16	52	59	0.881	42	
11	Sheffield Wednesday	42	14	13	15	56	47	1.191	41	
12	Stoke City	42	17	7	18	63	58	1.086	41	
13	West Bromwich Albion	42	16	7	19	77	73	1.055	39	
14	Burnley	42	15	9	18	66	76	0.868	39	
15	Manchester City	42	12	15	15	43	52	0.827	39	
16	West Ham United	42	14	8	20	80	84	0.952	36	
17	Sunderland	42	14	8	20	58	72	0.806	36	
18	Fulham	42	11	12	19	71	83	0.855	34	
19	Southampton	42	14	6	22	74	92	0.804	34	
20	Newcastle United	42	12	9	21	39	81	0.481	33	
21	Aston Villa (R)	42	11	7	24	54	85	0.635	29	Relegation to the Second Division
22	Blackpool (R)	42	6	9	27	41	76	0.539	21	Relegation to the Second Division

Source: World Football
Rules for classification: 1) Points; 2) Goal average; 3) Goals scored
(C) Champions; (R) Relegated

=== Second Division ===
Coventry City, under the management of Jimmy Hill, reached the First Division for the first time in their history as Second Division champions. They would wait 51 years to be promoted from any league again until 2018. Wolves ended their two-year exile from the top flight by securing promotion as runners-up.

Carlisle United missed out on First Division football by six points - which would have given them a third promotion in four seasons, the quickest rise from the Fourth Division to the First.

Bury went down to the Third Division, as did Northampton Town in a second successive relegation.

Pos	Team	Pld	W	D	L	GF	GA	GAv	Pts	Qualification or relegation
1	Coventry City (C, P)	42	23	13	6	74	43	1.721	59	Promotion to the First Division
2	Wolverhampton Wanderers (P)	42	25	8	9	88	48	1.833	58	Promotion to the First Division
3	Carlisle United	42	23	6	13	71	54	1.315	52	
4	Blackburn Rovers	42	19	13	10	56	46	1.217	51	
5	Ipswich Town	42	17	16	9	70	54	1.296	50	
6	Huddersfield Town	42	20	9	13	58	46	1.261	49	
7	Crystal Palace	42	19	10	13	61	55	1.109	48	
8	Millwall	42	18	9	15	49	58	0.845	45	
9	Bolton Wanderers	42	14	14	14	64	58	1.103	42	
10	Birmingham City	42	16	8	18	70	66	1.061	40	
11	Norwich City	42	13	14	15	49	55	0.891	40	
12	Hull City	42	16	7	19	77	72	1.069	39	
13	Preston North End	42	16	7	19	65	67	0.970	39	
14	Portsmouth	42	13	13	16	59	70	0.843	39	
15	Bristol City	42	12	14	16	56	62	0.903	38	
16	Plymouth Argyle	42	14	9	19	59	58	1.017	37	
17	Derby County	42	12	12	18	68	72	0.944	36	
18	Rotherham United	42	13	10	19	61	70	0.871	36	
19	Charlton Athletic	42	13	9	20	49	53	0.925	35	
20	Cardiff City	42	12	9	21	61	87	0.701	33	Qualification for the European Cup Winners' Cup first round (Note: Cardiff City qualified for the European Cup Winners' Cup as the 1966–67 Welsh Cup winners.)
21	Northampton Town (R)	42	12	6	24	47	84	0.560	30	Relegation to the Third Division
22	Bury (R)	42	11	6	25	49	83	0.590	28	Relegation to the Third Division

Rules for classification: 1) Points; 2) Goal average; 3) Goals scored
(C) Champions; (P) Promoted; (R) Relegated

=== Third Division ===
Queens Park Rangers sealed promotion as runaway champions of the Third Division, and also won the League Cup to become the first team at this level to win a major trophy. They were joined in promotion by runners-up Middlesbrough, while Watford missed out on Second Division football by a single point.

Workington, Doncaster Rovers, Darlington and Swansea Town were relegated to the Fourth Division.

Pos	Team	Pld	W	D	L	GF	GA	GAv	Pts	Promotion or relegation
1	Queens Park Rangers (C, P)	46	26	15	5	103	38	2.711	67	Promotion to the Second Division
2	Middlesbrough (P)	46	23	9	14	87	64	1.359	55	Promotion to the Second Division
3	Watford	46	20	14	12	61	46	1.326	54	
4	Reading	46	22	9	15	76	57	1.333	53	
5	Bristol Rovers	46	20	13	13	76	67	1.134	53	
6	Shrewsbury Town	46	20	12	14	77	62	1.242	52	
7	Torquay United	46	21	9	16	73	54	1.352	51	
8	Swindon Town	46	20	10	16	81	59	1.373	50	
9	Mansfield Town	46	20	9	17	84	79	1.063	49	
10	Oldham Athletic	46	19	10	17	80	63	1.270	48	
11	Gillingham	46	15	16	15	58	62	0.935	46	
12	Walsall	46	18	10	18	65	72	0.903	46	
13	Colchester United	46	17	10	19	76	73	1.041	44	
14	Orient	46	13	18	15	58	68	0.853	44	
15	Peterborough United	46	14	15	17	66	71	0.930	43	
16	Oxford United	46	15	13	18	61	66	0.924	43	
17	Grimsby Town	46	17	9	20	61	68	0.897	43	
18	Scunthorpe United	46	17	8	21	58	73	0.795	42	
19	Brighton & Hove Albion	46	13	15	18	61	71	0.859	41	
20	Bournemouth & Boscombe Athletic	46	12	17	17	39	57	0.684	41	
21	Swansea Town (R)	46	12	15	19	85	89	0.955	39	Relegation to the Fourth Division
22	Darlington (R)	46	13	11	22	47	81	0.580	37	Relegation to the Fourth Division
23	Doncaster Rovers (R)	46	12	8	26	58	117	0.496	32	Relegation to the Fourth Division
24	Workington (R)	46	12	7	27	55	89	0.618	31	Relegation to the Fourth Division

(C) Champions; (P) Promoted; (R) Relegated

=== Fourth Division ===
Stockport County clinched promotion to the Third Division as Fourth Division champions, and went upwards along with Southport, Barrow and Tranmere Rovers.

Luton Town recorded the lowest finish to date by finishing 17th, less than a decade after being First Division members and FA Cup finalists.

Pos	Team	Pld	W	D	L	GF	GA	GAv	Pts	Promotion or relegation
1	Stockport County (C, P)	46	26	12	8	69	42	1.643	64	Promotion to the Third Division
2	Southport (P)	46	23	13	10	69	42	1.643	59	Promotion to the Third Division
3	Barrow (P)	46	24	11	11	76	54	1.407	59	Promotion to the Third Division
4	Tranmere Rovers (P)	46	22	14	10	66	43	1.535	58	Promotion to the Third Division
5	Crewe Alexandra	46	21	12	13	70	55	1.273	54	
6	Southend United	46	22	9	15	70	49	1.429	53	
7	Wrexham	46	16	20	10	76	62	1.226	52	
8	Hartlepools United	46	22	7	17	66	64	1.031	51	
9	Brentford	46	18	13	15	58	56	1.036	49	
10	Aldershot	46	18	12	16	72	57	1.263	48	
11	Bradford City	46	19	10	17	74	62	1.194	48	
12	Halifax Town	46	15	14	17	59	68	0.868	44	
13	Port Vale	46	14	15	17	55	58	0.948	43	
14	Exeter City	46	14	15	17	50	60	0.833	43	
15	Chesterfield	46	17	8	21	60	63	0.952	42	
16	Barnsley	46	13	15	18	60	64	0.938	41	
17	Luton Town	46	16	9	21	59	73	0.808	41	
18	Newport County	46	12	16	18	56	63	0.889	40	
19	Chester	46	15	10	21	54	78	0.692	40	
20	Notts County	46	13	11	22	53	72	0.736	37	
21	Rochdale	46	13	11	22	53	75	0.707	37	Re-elected
22	York City	46	12	11	23	65	79	0.823	35	Re-elected
23	Bradford (Park Avenue)	46	11	13	22	52	79	0.658	35	Re-elected
24	Lincoln City	46	9	13	24	58	82	0.707	31	Re-elected

Source: rsssf.com
(C) Champions; (P) Promoted

=== Top goalscorers ===
First Division

- Ron Davies (Southampton) – 37 goals

Second Division

- Bobby Gould (Coventry City) – 24 goals

Third Division

- Rodney Marsh (Queens Park Rangers) – 30 goals

Fourth Division

- Ernie Phythian (Hartlepools United) – 23 goals
