= Bircumshaw =

Bircumshaw is an English surname. Notable people with the surname include:

- Peter Bircumshaw (1938–2017), English footballer
- Tony Bircumshaw (born 1945), English footballer, brother of Peter
