= Brian Drysdale =

English footballer (born 1943)

Personal information
- Date of birth: 24 February 1943
- Place of birth: Wingate, Durham, England
- Position: Left back

Senior career*
Years	Team	Apps	(Gls)
1960–1965	Lincoln City	21	(0)
1965–1969	Hartlepool United	170	(2)
1969–1977	Bristol City	282	(3)
1977	→ Reading (loan)	16	(0)
1977–1978	Oxford United	15	(0)
197?–19??	Frome Town		
- Shepton Mallet
- Clevedon Town

Managerial career
- Frome Town (player manager)
- Shepton Mallet (player manager)
- * Club domestic league appearances and goals

Brian Drysdale (born 24 February 1943) is an English former professional footballer who played as a left back. He made over 500 appearances in the Football League in the 1960s and 70s.

== Career ==
Brian Drysdale played junior football for Lincoln City. Drysdale made his League debut for Lincoln City before signing as a professional. Drysdale joined Hartlepool United on a free transfer in July 1965. Drysdale played under the Brian Clough and Peter Taylor management partnership during the seasons 1965-66 and 1966-67, also starred in the 1967-68 promotion from the Fourth Division when Hartlepool United finished in 3rd place. Hartlepool were relegated the following season finishing in 22nd place in the Third Division. Alan Dicks signed Drysdale in May 1969 for £10,000 from Hartlepool United for Bristol City. Drysdale had a loan spell at Reading in 1977. Drysdale left Bristol City to join Oxford United in July 1977.

Brian Drysdale then joined Western League side Frome Town as player manager. Drysdale was also player manager at Shepton Mallet before playing for Clevedon Town. Brian Drysdale finished his footballing career in the Bristol area with spells as player manager of Clandown F.C. and Hengrove F.C.

After retiring from playing Brian Drysdale became a self-employed carpenter in Stockwood, Bristol. His son Jason Drysdale was born in Bristol in 1970, also a left back, he played for England Youth and in Football League for Watford, Swindon Town and Northampton Town.

== Honours ==
with Hartlepool United

- Football League Fourth Division promotion: 1967–68

with Bristol City

- Football League Second Division runners up: 1975–76
