= Tony Parry =

English footballer (1945–2009)

Personal information
- Full name: Antony John Parry
- Date of birth: 8 September 1945
- Place of birth: Burton upon Trent, England
- Date of death: 23 November 2009 (aged 64)
- Position: Central defender

Senior career*
Years	Team	Apps	(Gls)
- Burton Albion
1965–1972	Hartlepool United	189	(5)
1972–1974	Derby County	6	(0)
1973–1974	→ Mansfield Town (loan)	1	(0)
1976–1985	Gresley Rovers		
- * Club domestic league appearances and goals

Anthony John Parry (8 September 1945 – 23 November 2009) was an English footballer who made nearly 200 appearances in the Football League playing as a central defender for Hartlepool United, Derby County and Mansfield Town.

Parry was born in Burton upon Trent. He was Brian Clough's first signing as manager of Hartlepool in the 1965–66 playing as regular in the 1966-67 season. He was a mainstay of the side which won promotion from the Fourth Division in the 1967–68 season and won the club's inaugural Player of the Year award.

In 1972 the club was on the brink of going out of business, needing to sell a player to survive, when Clough, by then manager of Derby County, bid £2,500 for the player. It is usually regarded as a philanthropic gesture by Clough (albeit using Derby's money) as Parry made few appearances for Derby before moving on to Mansfield Town.

He later played non-league football for Gresley Rovers, where he was Player of the Year in the 1982–83 season.

In February 2009, Parry made a triumphant return to the North East as guest of honour at Hartlepool United's centenary dinner. Barry Butlin, Secretary & Treasurer of Derby County Former Players' Association, said: "It is fitting that Tony's fans at Hartlepool and in the North East had the opportunity to honour him at the 'Centenary' celebrations, and Tony was delighted to be greeted by his telly idol Jeff Stelling."

Parry died suddenly on 23 November 2009, with pneumonia.
