= Kenny Simpkins =

Welsh footballer (1943–2023)

Personal information
- Date of birth: 21 December 1943
- Place of birth: Wrexham, Wales
- Date of death: 15 February 2023 (aged 79)
- Place of death: Hartlepool, England
- Position: Goalkeeper

Youth career
- 1959–1962: Wrexham

Senior career*
Years	Team	Apps	(Gls)
1962–1964	Wrexham	4	(0)
1964–1968	Hartlepools United	121	(1)
1968–1969	Boston United	11	(3)
Total		136	(4)

International career
1966	Wales U23	1	(0)
- * Club domestic league appearances and goals

Kenny Simpkins (21 December 1943 – 16 February 2023) was a Welsh goalkeeper who played professionally in the 1960s.

== Playing career ==
After five unproductive years at Wrexham he joined Hartlepools United, during which time he played for the Welsh Under 23 side. On 18 November 1967, due to numerous injuries in the Hartlepool team, Simpkins started a game for the club as a striker and scored in a 3–2 win against Port Vale. He made a total of 134 appearances in all competitions for Pools, during his time with club he was managed by Brian Clough during seasons 1965-66 and 1966-67 and was also a part of the first ever Hartlepool side to win promotion.

In 1968, Simpkins signed for Boston United as the club's backup goalkeeper. Like at Hartlepool, Simpkins was forced to play one game as a striker due to an injury crisis. As a result, he became a cult hero as he scored a hat-trick in 15 minutes in a 4–2 win against Goole Town.

== Personal life and death ==
After divorcing his first wife Hazel, he married a girl from Hartlepool called Marion. The couple had one daughter, named Julie. After his playing career finished, he lived in the town for many years with his wife before he moved to a care home in Blackhall Colliery later in life.

Simpkins died in Hartlepool on 16 February 2023, at the age of 79. His former Hartlepool teammate John McGovern paid tribute to him saying "He was a huge character in the dressing room during his four years at the club. He was always encouraging me in my early days at Pools and I am so grateful that through the years I thanked him for that guidance and help. Ken was a real winner and always gave everything for the team and he was loved by the promotion winning squad."
