= Jimmy Cooper (footballer) =

Scottish footballer

Personal information
- Full name: James Thomson Cooper
- Date of birth: 28 December 1939 (age 86)
- Place of birth: Glasgow, Scotland
- Height: 5 ft 9 in (1.75 m)
- Position: Winger

Senior career*
Years	Team	Apps	(Gls)
19??–1960	Ardeer Thistle		
1960–196?	Raith Rovers	8	(0)
196?–1962	Airdrieonians	9	(2)
1962–1965	Brighton & Hove Albion	41	(6)
1965–1966	Hartlepools United	19	(1)
1966	Addington		
1967–19??	Cape Town City		
- * Club domestic league appearances and goals

James Thomson Cooper (born 28 December 1939), commonly known as Jim or Jimmy Cooper, is a Scottish former professional footballer who played as a winger in the Scottish League for Raith Rovers and Airdrieonians and in the English Football League for Brighton & Hove Albion and Hartlepools United.

== Life and career ==
Cooper was born in Glasgow in 1939. A right-footed winger with considerable pace, he joined Raith Rovers from junior club Ardeer Thistle in December 1965. He made nine appearances in the 1960–61 Scottish Division One season as his team finished just above the relegation places, and the following season he scored twice from eight appearances for Airdrieonians as they avoided the drop by an even narrower margin. After a trial, Cooper signed for English club Brighton & Hove Albion, newly relegated to the Football League Third Division. He played in around half the matches as the team suffered a second consecutive relegation, and a similar number in 1963–64. After his third season was spent entirely in the reserves, in the 1965–66 season he signed for Hartlepools United, where he made 22 appearances under manager Brian Clough in all competitions, and then moved into South African football with Addington and Cape Town City.
