= Les Green =

English footballer & manager (1941–2012)

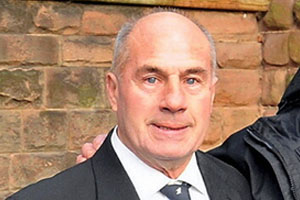

Personal information
- Full name: Leslie Green
- Date of birth: 17 October 1941
- Place of birth: Atherstone, England
- Date of death: 30 July 2012 (aged 70)
- Place of death: Leicester, England
- Position: Goalkeeper

Youth career
- Atherstone Boys Club
- Mancetter
- Baddesley Colliery

Senior career*
Years	Team	Apps	(Gls)
1958–1960	Atherstone Town		(0)
1960–1962	Hull City	4	(0)
1962–1965	Nuneaton Borough		(0)
1965	Burton Albion		(0)
1965–1967	Hartlepools United	34	(0)
1967–1968	Rochdale	44	(0)
1968–1971	Derby County	107	(0)
1971–1974	Durban City		(0)
Total		189	(0)

Managerial career
- Durban City (assistant)
- 1990–1992: Nuneaton Borough
- Hinckley Town
- 1994–1995: Tamworth
- Bedworth
- * Club domestic league appearances and goals

Leslie Green (17 October 1941 – 30 July 2012) was an English footballer and manager.

== Playing career ==
=== Atherstone Town ===
Les Green started out at a young age playing for youth teams around his hometown of Atherstone. He played for Atherstone Boys Club, Mancetter and Baddesley Colliery before being snapped up by local team Atherstone Town.

Green then decided to try to make it with a professional team, so he managed to get a trial with Arsenal. Unfortunately for Green, he never made the grade because manager George Swindin said he was too short at 5 ft 8 in (1.73 m).

=== Hull City ===
Following this Hull City came calling for Green's services and he signed for The Tigers in 1960. Following 4 appearances Green returned to Non-League football with Nuneaton Borough.

=== Burton Albion ===
After three years with Boro, Green joined Burton Albion under the management of Peter Taylor.

=== Hartlepools United ===
After just three months with the Brewers, in the 1965–66 season Green followed Taylor to Hartlepools United, where he made 34 appearances until the 1966-67 season.

=== Rochdale ===
1967 saw Green on the move again, this time playing for Rochdale under Bob Stokoe

=== Derby County ===
Green was at The Dale for just over one season and made 44 appearances before for the third time in his career he was reunited with Peter Taylor but this time at Derby County in 1968.

The season Green joined a team that was changing for the better under Clough and Taylor's management. He was part of Second Division-winning team and the side that was in constant dispute with Leeds United due to the Clough/Revie rivalry.

=== Durban City ===
In 1971 Green decided to leave top flight English football for National Football League side Durban City in South Africa. During his time with the Golden Boys, Green played with the likes of Alan Skirton, Bernd Patzke and Johnny Byrne. Green also had the pleasure of playing alongside Stanley Matthews in a rare guest appearance – when the man himself was into his fifties.

Green's leg was badly broken in a clash with Bobby Viljoen in a crunch derby game against arch-rivals Durban United which ended his playing career.

Green's last game was a testimonial match for former Derby County goalkeeper Martin Taylor in a game against Everton on 14 May 1997. The game ended 4–1 to The Rams.

== Management career ==
Following Green's retirement from football, he stayed in South Africa at Durban City as assistant manager until returning to England to take on the role of Commercial Manager at former side Nuneaton Borough.

Green went on to become manager of Nuneaton Borough. He then went on to manage a string of non-League clubs, including Hinckley Town, Tamworth and Bedworth Utd.

== Personal life ==
Green was married to Heidi, the daughter of a Natal farmer, whom he met whilst residing in South Africa. Green had a son called Simon.

== Death ==
On 30 June 2012, Green died of cancer at Loros Hospice near Leicester, aged 70. After the news of his death, former teammates from the world of football paid tribute to him. John McGovern, who played with Green at both Hartlepools and Derby County said, "I went to see him a few days ago and he was in a poor way but I'm glad I went, because we managed to have a last couple of laughs together. He was an incredible character."

== Career honours ==
=== Honours as player ===
==== Derby County ====
- Football League Second Division: 1968-69
- Watney Cup: 1970

==== Durban City ====
- Champion of Champions: 1971
- National Football League: 1972
- Coca-Cola Shield: 1972

== Managerial stats ==
Team	From	To	Record						
Team	From	To	P	W	D	L	GF	GA	Win %
Nuneaton Borough			0	0	0	0	0	0	—
Hinckley Town			0	0	0	0	0	0	—
Tamworth	12 March 1994	14 January 1995	50	25	11	14	100	83	50.00
Bedford			0	0	0	0	0	0	—
Total			50	25	11	14	100	83	50.00
