= Billy Marshall =

Northern Irish footballer

Personal information
- Full name: William Marshall
- Date of birth: 11 July 1936
- Place of birth: Belfast, Northern Ireland
- Date of death: 20 April 2007 (aged 70)
- Place of death: Hartlepool, England
- Height: 5 ft 8 in (1.73 m)
- Position: Full back

Senior career*
Years	Team	Apps	(Gls)
1953–1962	Burnley	6	(0)
1962–1964	Oldham Athletic	57	(0)
1964–1966	Hartlepools United	57	(0)

International career
1958–1960	Northern Ireland B	2	(0)
- * Club domestic league appearances and goals

William Marshall (11 July 1936 – 20 April 2007) was a Northern Irish professional footballer who played as a full back. He played in the Football League for Burnley, Oldham Athletic and Hartlepools United during the 1965-66 season.

He won two caps for the Northern Ireland B national football team between 1958 and 1960. He died on 20 April 2007, following a short illness.
