= Barry Ashworth (footballer) =

English footballer (1942–2024)

Personal information
- Date of birth: 18 August 1942
- Place of birth: Stockport, England
- Date of death: 10 December 2024 (aged 82)
- Place of death: Bangor, Wales
- Position: Wing half

Senior career*
Years	Team	Apps	(Gls)
c 1962–1963	Bangor City		
1963–1965	Southend United	31	(5)
1965–1966	Hartlepools United	45	(4)
1966–1967	Tranmere Rovers	21	(3)
1967–1970	Chester	119	(12)
1970–?	Altrincham		
- Ellesmere Port Town
?–1974	Altrincham		
1974–?	Bangor City		

Managerial career
- 1975: Bangor City (caretaker)
- * Club domestic league appearances and goals

Barry Ashworth (18 August 1942 – 10 December 2024) was an English footballer.

== Playing career ==
Ashworth was playing Non-League football for Bangor City before he joined Southend United in 1963. Spells with Hartlepools United (1965-66 season) and Tranmere Rovers followed, before moving to Chester in time for 1967–68.

At Chester, Ashworth had a reputation as a popular but volatile player. In his final season at the club (1969–70) he was twice hit with six-week suspensions for disciplinary reasons. The second suspension led to him being placed on the transfer list and he ended his career in The Football League, joining Altrincham. He went on to play for Ellesmere Port Town before a second spell with Altrincham.

Ashworth later returned to Bangor and enjoyed a spell as caretaker player-manager of the club.

== Death ==
Ashworth died on 10 December 2024, at the age of 82.
