= Johnny Gill (footballer) =

English footballer

Personal information
- Full name: John Barry Anthony Gill
- Date of birth: 3 February 1941 (age 85)
- Place of birth: Wednesbury, England
- Position: Central defender

Senior career*
Years	Team	Apps	(Gls)
1958–1961	Nottingham Forest	0	(0)
1961–1966	Mansfield Town	139	(0)
1966–1971	Hartlepools United	204	(1)
1971–1973	Nuneaton Borough		
1973	Atherstone Town		
Total		343	(1)
- * Club domestic league appearances and goals

John Barry Anthony Gill (born 3 February 1941) is an English former professional footballer who played in the Football League for Hartlepools United since the 1966-67 season and Mansfield Town.
