= 1966–67 Welsh Cup =

Tournament details
- Country: Wales

Final positions
- Champions: (Wales) Cardiff City
- Runners-up: (Wales) Wrexham

The 1966–67 FAW Welsh Cup is the 80th season of the annual knockout tournament for competitive football teams in Wales.

== Key ==
League name pointed after clubs name.

- CCL - Cheshire County League
- FL D2 - Football League Second Division
- FL D3 - Football League Third Division
- FL D4 - Football League Fourth Division
- SFL - Southern Football League
- WLN - Welsh League North

== Fifth round ==
Ten winners from the Fourth round and six new clubs.

Tie no	Home	Score	Away
1	Wrexham (FL D4)	5–0	Rhyl (CCL)
2	Borough United (WLN)	2–5	Chester (FL D4)

== Sixth round ==
Tie no	Home	Score	Away
1	Newport County (FL D4)	0–0	Bangor City (CCL)
replay	Bangor City (CCL)	0–1	Newport County (FL D4)
2	Cardiff City (FL D2)	6–3	Hereford United (SFL)
3	Merthyr Tydfil (SFL)	1–7	Wrexham (FL D4)
4	Pwllheli & District (WLN)	2–3	Chester (FL D4)

== Semifinal ==
Tie no	Home	Score	Away
1	Chester (FL D4)	0–0	Wrexham (FL D4)
replay	Wrexham (FL D4)	4–2	Chester (FL D4)
2	Newport County (FL D4)	1–2	Cardiff City (FL D2)

== Final ==
Tie no	Home	Score	Away
1	Wrexham (FL D4)	2–2	Cardiff City (FL D2)
1	Cardiff City (FL D2)	2–1	Wrexham (FL D4)
