= Terry Bell (footballer) =

English footballer

Personal information
- Date of birth: 1 August 1944
- Place of birth: Nottingham, England
- Date of death: 15 May 2014 (aged 69)
- Positions: Midfielder; forward

Senior career*
Years	Team	Apps	(Gls)
- Burton Albion
1964	Nottingham Forest	0	(0)
1964–1965	Manchester City	0	(0)
1965	Portsmouth	0	(0)
1965–1966	Nuneaton Borough		
1966–1969	Hartlepool United	117	(34)
1969–1973	Reading	87	(20)
1973–1978	Aldershot	124	(49)
- Wokingham Town
- Hillingdon Borough
Total		328	(103)
- * Club domestic league appearances and goals

Terry Bell (1 August 1944 – 15 May 2014) was an English professional footballer who played as a midfielder and forward.

== Career ==
Born in Nottingham, Bell played for Burton Albion, Nottingham Forest, Manchester City, Portsmouth, Nuneaton Borough, Hartlepool United, Reading, Aldershot, Wokingham Town and Hillingdon Borough.

== Later life and death ==
Bell died 15 May 2014, at the age of 69.
