= Peter Bircumshaw =

English footballer (1938–2017)

Personal information
- Date of birth: 29 August 1938 (age 88)
- Place of birth: Mansfield, England
- Position: Left winger

Youth career
- Notts County

Senior career*
| Years | Team | Apps | (Gls) |
| 1956–1962 | Notts County | 72 | (40) |
| 1962–1963 | Bradford City | 27 | (7) |
| 1963–1964 | Stockport County | 17 | (4) |
| 1964–1965 | Cambridge City | 32 | (7) |
- * Club domestic league appearances and goals

Peter Bircumshaw (29 August 1938 – June 2017) was a footballer who played as a left winger in the Football League for Notts County, Bradford City and Stockport County.

Bircumshaw started his professional career with Notts County, where he scored 40 goals in 72 league games before he moved to Bradford City in 1962. He spent just one season at Valley Parade, but he finished as the club's joint top goal-scorer with seven league goals and four in the FA Cup, including a hat-trick in a 5–2 win over Oldham Athletic. He joined Stockport County before he moved into non-league football with Cambridge City. He was with Cambridge City from February 1964 to January 1965.

Bircumshaw's brother Tony also played professional football.
