= 1966–67 Football League =

68th season of the Football League

The Football League
- Season: 1966–67
- Champions: Manchester United

The 1966–67 season was the 68th completed season of The Football League.

== Final league tables ==
The tables and results below are reproduced here in the exact form that they can be found at the RSSSF website and in Rothmans Book of Football League Records 1888–89 to 1978–79, with home and away statistics separated.

Beginning with the 1894–95 season, clubs finishing level on points were separated according to goal average (goals scored divided by goals conceded), or more properly put, goal ratio. In case one or more teams had the same goal difference, this system favoured those teams who had scored fewer goals. The goal average system was eventually scrapped since the 1976–77 season.

Since the Fourth Division was established in the 1958–59 season, the bottom four teams of that division were required to apply for re-election.

== First Division ==
First Division
- Season: 1966–67
- Champions: Manchester United; 7th English title
- Relegated: Aston Villa; Blackpool
- European Cup: Manchester United
- Cup Winners' Cup: Tottenham Hotspur
- Inter-Cities Fairs Cup: Nottingham Forest; Leeds United; Liverpool
- Matches: 462
- Goals: 1,387 (3 per match)
- Top goalscorer: Ron Davies (37 goals)

Pos	Team	Pld	W	D	L	GF	GA	GAv	Pts	Qualification or relegation
1	Manchester United (C)	42	24	12	6	84	45	1.867	60	Qualification for the European Cup first round
2	Nottingham Forest	42	23	10	9	64	41	1.561	56	Qualification for the Inter-Cities Fairs Cup first round
3	Tottenham Hotspur	42	24	8	10	71	48	1.479	56	Qualification for the European Cup Winners' Cup first round (Note: Tottenham Hotspur qualified for the European Cup Winners' Cup as the 1966–67 FA Cup winners.)
4	Leeds United	42	22	11	9	62	42	1.476	55	Qualification for the Inter-Cities Fairs Cup first round
5	Liverpool	42	19	13	10	64	47	1.362	51	Qualification for the Inter-Cities Fairs Cup first round
6	Everton	42	19	10	13	65	46	1.413	48	
7	Arsenal	42	16	14	12	58	47	1.234	46	
8	Leicester City	42	18	8	16	78	71	1.099	44	
9	Chelsea	42	15	14	13	67	62	1.081	44	
10	Sheffield United	42	16	10	16	52	59	0.881	42	
11	Sheffield Wednesday	42	14	13	15	56	47	1.191	41	
12	Stoke City	42	17	7	18	63	58	1.086	41	
13	West Bromwich Albion	42	16	7	19	77	73	1.055	39	
14	Burnley	42	15	9	18	66	76	0.868	39	
15	Manchester City	42	12	15	15	43	52	0.827	39	
16	West Ham United	42	14	8	20	80	84	0.952	36	
17	Sunderland	42	14	8	20	58	72	0.806	36	
18	Fulham	42	11	12	19	71	83	0.855	34	
19	Southampton	42	14	6	22	74	92	0.804	34	
20	Newcastle United	42	12	9	21	39	81	0.481	33	
21	Aston Villa (R)	42	11	7	24	54	85	0.635	29	Relegation to the Second Division
22	Blackpool (R)	42	6	9	27	41	76	0.539	21	Relegation to the Second Division

Source: World Football
Rules for classification: 1) Points; 2) Goal average; 3) Goals scored
(C) Champions; (R) Relegated

=== Results ===
Home \ Away	ARS	AST	BLP	BUR	CHE	EVE	FUL	LEE	LEI	LIV	MCI	MUN	NEW	NOT	SHU	SHW	SOU	STK	SUN	TOT	WBA	WHU
Arsenal		1–0	1–1	0–0	2–1	3–1	1–0	0–1	2–4	1–1	1–0	1–1	2–0	1–1	2–0	1–1	4–1	3–1	2–0	0–2	2–3	2–1
Aston Villa	0–1		3–2	0–1	2–6	2–4	1–1	3–0	0–1	2–3	3–0	2–1	1–1	1–1	0–0	0–1	0–1	2–1	2–1	3–3	3–2	0–2
Blackpool	0–3	0–2		0–2	0–2	0–1	0–1	0–2	1–1	1–2	0–1	1–2	6–0	1–1	0–1	1–1	2–3	0–1	1–1	2–2	1–3	1–4
Burnley	1–4	4–2	1–0		1–2	1–1	3–0	1–1	5–2	1–0	2–3	1–1	0–2	0–2	4–0	2–0	4–1	0–2	1–0	2–2	5–1	4–2
Chelsea	3–1	3–1	0–2	1–3		1–1	0–0	2–2	2–2	1–2	0–0	1–3	2–1	2–1	1–1	0–0	4–1	1–0	1–1	3–0	0–2	5–5
Everton	0–0	3–1	0–1	1–1	3–1		3–2	2–0	2–0	3–1	1–1	1–2	1–1	0–1	4–1	2–1	0–1	0–1	4–1	0–1	5–4	4–0
Fulham	0–0	5–1	2–2	0–0	1–3	0–1		2–2	4–2	2–2	4–1	2–2	5–1	2–3	0–1	1–2	3–1	4–1	3–1	3–4	2–2	4–2
Leeds United	3–1	0–2	1–1	3–1	1–0	1–1	3–1		3–1	2–1	0–0	3–1	5–0	1–1	2–0	1–0	0–1	3–0	2–1	3–2	2–1	2–1
Leicester City	2–1	5–0	3–0	5–1	3–2	2–2	0–2	0–0		2–1	2–1	1–2	4–2	3–0	2–2	0–1	1–1	4–2	1–2	0–1	2–1	5–4
Liverpool	0–0	1–0	1–3	2–0	2–1	0–0	2–2	5–0	3–2		3–2	0–0	3–1	4–0	1–0	1–1	2–1	2–1	2–2	0–0	0–1	2–0
Manchester City	1–1	1–1	1–0	1–0	1–4	1–0	3–0	2–1	1–3	2–1		1–1	1–1	1–1	1–1	0–0	1–1	3–1	1–0	1–2	2–2	1–4
Manchester United	1–0	3–1	4–0	4–1	1–1	3–0	2–1	0–0	5–2	2–2	1–0		3–2	1–0	2–0	2–0	3–0	0–0	5–0	1–0	5–3	3–0
Newcastle United	2–1	0–3	2–1	1–1	2–2	0–3	1–1	1–2	1–0	0–2	2–0	0–0		0–0	1–0	3–1	3–1	3–1	0–3	0–2	1–3	1–0
Nottingham Forest	2–1	3–0	2–0	4–1	0–0	1–0	2–1	1–0	1–0	1–1	2–0	4–1	3–0		3–1	1–1	3–1	1–2	3–1	1–1	2–1	1–0
Sheffield United	1–1	3–3	1–1	1–1	3–0	0–0	4–0	1–4	0–1	0–1	1–0	2–1	0–1	1–2		1–0	2–0	2–1	2–0	2–1	4–3	3–1
Sheffield Wednesday	1–1	2–0	3–0	7–0	6–1	1–2	1–1	0–0	1–1	0–1	1–0	2–2	0–0	0–2	2–2		4–1	1–3	5–0	1–0	1–0	0–2
Southampton	2–1	6–2	1–5	4–0	0–3	1–3	4–2	0–2	4–4	1–2	1–1	1–2	2–0	2–1	2–3	4–2		3–2	3–1	0–1	2–2	6–2
Stoke City	2–2	6–1	2–0	4–3	1–1	2–1	1–2	0–0	3–1	2–0	0–1	3–0	0–1	1–2	3–0	0–2	3–2		3–0	2–0	1–1	1–1
Sunderland	1–3	2–1	4–0	4–3	2–0	0–2	3–1	0–2	2–3	2–2	1–0	0–0	3–0	1–0	4–1	2–0	2–0	2–1		0–1	2–2	2–4
Tottenham Hotspur	3–1	0–1	1–3	2–0	1–1	2–0	4–2	3–1	2–0	2–1	1–1	2–1	4–0	2–1	2–0	2–1	5–3	2–0	1–0		0–0	3–4
West Bromwich Albion	0–1	2–1	3–1	1–2	0–1	1–0	5–1	2–0	1–0	2–1	0–3	3–4	6–1	1–2	1–2	1–2	3–2	0–1	2–2	3–0		3–1
West Ham United	2–2	2–1	4–0	3–2	1–2	2–3	6–1	0–1	0–1	1–1	1–1	1–6	3–0	3–1	0–2	3–0	2–2	1–1	2–2	0–2	3–0	

Updated to match(es) played on unknown. Source: Ian Laschke: Rothmans Book of Football League Records 1888–89 to 1978–79. Macdonald and Jane’s, London & Sydney, 1980.
Legend: Blue = home team win; Yellow = draw; Red = away team win.

=== Maps ===
Locations of the Football League First Division London teams 1966–1967
Locations of the Football League First Division 1966–1967 teams

== Second Division ==
Second Division
- Season: 1966–67
- Champions: Coventry City
- Promoted: Coventry City; Wolverhampton Wanderers
- Relegated: Northampton Town; Bury
- Cup Winners' Cup: Cardiff City
- Matches: 462
- Goals: 1,361 (2.95 per match)
- Top goalscorer: Bobby Gould (24 goals)

Pos	Team	Pld	W	D	L	GF	GA	GAv	Pts	Qualification or relegation
1	Coventry City (C, P)	42	23	13	6	74	43	1.721	59	Promotion to the First Division
2	Wolverhampton Wanderers (P)	42	25	8	9	88	48	1.833	58	Promotion to the First Division
3	Carlisle United	42	23	6	13	71	54	1.315	52	
4	Blackburn Rovers	42	19	13	10	56	46	1.217	51	
5	Ipswich Town	42	17	16	9	70	54	1.296	50	
6	Huddersfield Town	42	20	9	13	58	46	1.261	49	
7	Crystal Palace	42	19	10	13	61	55	1.109	48	
8	Millwall	42	18	9	15	49	58	0.845	45	
9	Bolton Wanderers	42	14	14	14	64	58	1.103	42	
10	Birmingham City	42	16	8	18	70	66	1.061	40	
11	Norwich City	42	13	14	15	49	55	0.891	40	
12	Hull City	42	16	7	19	77	72	1.069	39	
13	Preston North End	42	16	7	19	65	67	0.970	39	
14	Portsmouth	42	13	13	16	59	70	0.843	39	
15	Bristol City	42	12	14	16	56	62	0.903	38	
16	Plymouth Argyle	42	14	9	19	59	58	1.017	37	
17	Derby County	42	12	12	18	68	72	0.944	36	
18	Rotherham United	42	13	10	19	61	70	0.871	36	
19	Charlton Athletic	42	13	9	20	49	53	0.925	35	
20	Cardiff City	42	12	9	21	61	87	0.701	33	Qualification for the European Cup Winners' Cup first round (Note: Cardiff City qualified for the European Cup Winners' Cup as the 1966–67 Welsh Cup winners.)
21	Northampton Town (R)	42	12	6	24	47	84	0.560	30	Relegation to the Third Division
22	Bury (R)	42	11	6	25	49	83	0.590	28	Relegation to the Third Division

Rules for classification: 1) Points; 2) Goal average; 3) Goals scored
(C) Champions; (P) Promoted; (R) Relegated

=== Results ===
Home \ Away	BIR	BLB	BOL	BRI	BRY	CAR	CRL	CHA	COV	CRY	DER	HUD	HUL	IPS	MIL	NOR	NWC	PLY	POR	PNE	ROT	WOL
Birmingham		1–1	2–2	4–0	1–3	1–2	1–2	4–0	1–1	3–1	2–0	0–1	2–1	2–2	2–0	3–0	2–1	0–0	3–0	3–1	2–3	3–2
Blackburn Rovers	1–0		0–0	1–0	2–1	4–1	2–0	2–1	0–1	2–1	0–0	2–0	4–1	1–2	1–0	3–0	0–0	3–0	2–2	2–0	1–1	0–0
Bolton Wanderers	3–1	0–1		0–0	3–1	3–1	3–0	2–1	1–1	0–0	3–1	1–0	2–1	1–1	5–0	1–2	1–1	1–2	0–1	4–2	2–2	0–0
Bristol City	3–1	2–2	1–1		3–3	1–2	3–0	4–0	2–2	0–1	4–1	1–1	2–1	1–1	1–1	1–0	1–0	1–0	3–3	2–0	1–2	1–0
Bury	0–2	1–2	2–1	2–1		2–0	0–2	2–1	0–1	1–1	2–2	0–0	3–2	1–2	0–1	1–2	2–0	1–0	1–3	3–4	5–2	2–1
Cardiff City	3–0	1–1	2–5	5–1	3–0		4–2	4–1	1–1	1–2	1–1	1–1	2–4	0–2	1–1	4–2	2–0	4–1	0–0	4–0	0–0	0–3
Carlisle United	2–0	1–2	6–1	2–1	2–0	3–0		1–0	2–1	3–0	0–0	2–1	2–0	2–1	2–1	2–0	1–0	0–0	5–1	1–1	2–3	1–3
Charlton Athletic	1–0	0–0	0–1	5–0	4–0	5–0	1–0		1–2	1–1	3–1	1–2	1–3	2–1	0–0	3–0	0–0	1–0	0–2	2–0	2–0	1–3
Coventry City	1–1	2–0	1–1	1–0	3–0	3–2	2–1	1–0		1–2	2–2	1–0	1–0	5–0	3–1	2–0	2–1	1–0	5–1	2–1	4–2	3–1
Crystal Palace	2–1	2–1	3–2	2–1	3–1	3–1	4–2	1–0	1–1		2–1	1–1	4–1	0–2	1–2	5–1	0–0	2–1	0–2	1–0	1–1	4–1
Derby County	1–2	2–3	2–2	2–0	3–1	1–1	0–1	0–2	1–2	2–0		4–3	2–3	2–2	5–1	4–3	1–1	1–1	0–0	5–1	2–0	0–3
Huddersfield Town	3–1	3–1	2–1	2–0	4–2	3–1	1–1	4–1	3–1	0–2	1–0		1–0	1–0	2–0	0–2	0–1	1–1	1–1	1–0	3–0	0–1
Hull City	0–2	2–3	1–1	0–2	2–0	1–0	1–2	2–2	2–2	6–1	1–3	2–0		1–1	2–0	6–1	5–0	4–2	2–0	2–2	1–0	3–1
Ipswich Town	3–2	1–1	2–2	0–0	2–0	0–0	1–2	0–0	1–1	2–0	4–3	3–0	5–4		4–1	6–1	0–2	1–1	4–2	0–0	3–2	3–1
Millwall	3–1	1–1	2–0	3–2	2–0	1–0	2–1	0–0	1–0	1–1	3–2	1–3	2–1	1–0		1–0	2–1	1–2	1–1	2–0	2–0	1–1
Northampton Town	2–1	2–1	2–1	2–1	0–0	2–0	3–3	1–1	0–0	1–0	0–2	0–1	2–2	1–1	1–2		1–2	2–1	2–4	1–5	3–1	0–4
Norwich City	3–3	0–1	1–0	1–0	2–0	3–2	2–0	1–1	1–1	4–3	4–1	0–0	0–2	1–2	1–1	1–0		3–1	0–0	1–1	1–0	1–2
Plymouth Argyle	1–1	4–0	2–0	1–2	4–1	7–1	1–2	2–1	4–2	1–0	1–2	2–3	3–1	1–1	3–1	1–0	2–2		0–0	1–0	1–0	0–1
Portsmouth	4–5	1–1	2–1	1–1	1–2	1–2	2–1	1–2	0–2	1–1	0–3	1–1	0–1	4–2	0–1	3–2	3–3	2–1		2–0	3–2	2–3
Preston North End	3–0	3–0	1–3	2–2	2–2	4–0	2–3	2–1	3–2	1–0	2–0	1–2	4–2	2–0	2–1	2–1	3–1	2–0	1–0		1–1	1–2
Rotherham United	3–2	2–1	0–1	3–3	3–0	4–1	2–3	2–0	1–1	0–1	0–0	4–2	1–1	0–2	3–1	1–2	2–1	4–2	0–1	2–1		2–2
Wolverhampton Wanderers	1–2	4–0	5–2	1–1	4–1	7–1	1–1	1–0	1–3	1–1	5–3	1–0	4–0	0–0	2–0	1–0	4–1	2–1	3–1	3–2	2–0	

Updated to match(es) played on unknown. Source: Ian Laschke: Rothmans Book of Football League Records 1888–89 to 1978–79. Macdonald and Jane’s, London & Sydney, 1980.
Legend: Blue = home team win; Yellow = draw; Red = away team win.

=== Maps ===
Locations of the Football League Second Division London teams 1966–1967
Locations of the Football League Second Division 1966–1967 teams

== Third Division ==
Football League Third Division
- Season: 1966–67
- Champions: Queens Park Rangers (1st title)
- Promoted: Middlesbrough
- Relegated: Darlington, Doncaster Rovers, Swansea Town, Workington
- Matches: 552
- Goals: 1,646 (2.98 per match)
- Top goalscorer: Rodney Marsh (Queens Park Rangers), 30

Pos	Team	Pld	W	D	L	GF	GA	GAv	Pts	Promotion or relegation
1	Queens Park Rangers (C, P)	46	26	15	5	103	38	2.711	67	Promotion to the Second Division
2	Middlesbrough (P)	46	23	9	14	87	64	1.359	55	Promotion to the Second Division
3	Watford	46	20	14	12	61	46	1.326	54	
4	Reading	46	22	9	15	76	57	1.333	53	
5	Bristol Rovers	46	20	13	13	76	67	1.134	53	
6	Shrewsbury Town	46	20	12	14	77	62	1.242	52	
7	Torquay United	46	21	9	16	73	54	1.352	51	
8	Swindon Town	46	20	10	16	81	59	1.373	50	
9	Mansfield Town	46	20	9	17	84	79	1.063	49	
10	Oldham Athletic	46	19	10	17	80	63	1.270	48	
11	Gillingham	46	15	16	15	58	62	0.935	46	
12	Walsall	46	18	10	18	65	72	0.903	46	
13	Colchester United	46	17	10	19	76	73	1.041	44	
14	Orient	46	13	18	15	58	68	0.853	44	
15	Peterborough United	46	14	15	17	66	71	0.930	43	
16	Oxford United	46	15	13	18	61	66	0.924	43	
17	Grimsby Town	46	17	9	20	61	68	0.897	43	
18	Scunthorpe United	46	17	8	21	58	73	0.795	42	
19	Brighton & Hove Albion	46	13	15	18	61	71	0.859	41	
20	Bournemouth & Boscombe Athletic	46	12	17	17	39	57	0.684	41	
21	Swansea Town (R)	46	12	15	19	85	89	0.955	39	Relegation to the Fourth Division
22	Darlington (R)	46	13	11	22	47	81	0.580	37	Relegation to the Fourth Division
23	Doncaster Rovers (R)	46	12	8	26	58	117	0.496	32	Relegation to the Fourth Division
24	Workington (R)	46	12	7	27	55	89	0.618	31	Relegation to the Fourth Division

(C) Champions; (P) Promoted; (R) Relegated

=== Results ===
Home \ Away	B&BA	B&HA	BRR	COL	DAR	DON	GIL	GRI	MAN	MID	OLD	ORI	OXF	PET	QPR	REA	SCU	SHR	SWA	SWI	TOR	WAL	WAT	WRK
Bournemouth & Boscombe Athletic		2–1	0–0	1–1	1–1	4–1	1–0	0–0	1–3	1–1	2–1	1–0	0–0	1–1	1–3	2–2	0–0	0–3	1–0	1–4	1–0	3–0	0–0	0–2
Brighton & Hove Albion	0–3		3–2	1–1	5–0	0–0	2–2	0–2	1–0	1–1	2–0	1–0	2–0	5–2	2–2	0–1	2–2	2–1	3–2	2–2	0–1	2–3	1–0	0–0
Bristol Rovers	1–1	2–2		4–1	3–0	4–2	4–1	0–0	4–4	2–2	2–1	1–0	2–1	1–1	2–1	2–1	1–1	1–0	3–3	3–0	1–0	4–2	0–3	0–1
Colchester United	2–0	3–2	3–1		2–3	5–0	0–0	4–0	3–0	2–3	3–2	2–2	1–2	1–4	1–3	2–0	0–1	3–1	3–1	2–1	1–0	5–1	2–1	2–2
Darlington	1–2	3–1	0–3	0–4		3–2	1–1	1–0	1–1	0–3	2–3	0–0	1–2	5–0	0–0	0–1	2–1	1–1	1–0	2–1	0–0	0–1	1–0	1–1
Doncaster Rovers	1–1	1–1	3–2	1–4	0–4		2–3	3–2	4–6	0–4	1–1	2–2	2–1	3–1	1–1	0–2	3–0	2–1	4–1	1–0	2–1	2–1	0–0	2–1
Gillingham	0–0	2–0	1–0	2–1	1–2	3–1		2–0	5–2	5–1	1–0	0–0	3–1	2–2	2–2	0–2	0–1	1–1	0–0	1–0	0–0	0–0	4–1	1–1
Grimsby Town	1–0	2–3	0–0	0–0	4–1	4–1	4–0		1–2	2–1	1–0	1–2	1–0	1–1	1–1	2–0	7–1	1–1	2–1	3–4	1–0	3–1	0–2	4–1
Mansfield Town	1–0	2–1	2–0	2–0	2–2	3–1	4–1	4–0		4–5	2–4	1–1	1–1	0–0	1–7	4–2	3–1	0–1	1–2	1–3	4–2	4–1	2–1	0–1
Middlesbrough	3–1	1–0	1–2	4–0	4–0	2–0	1–1	0–1	1–0		0–2	3–1	4–1	2–1	2–2	2–2	2–1	1–0	4–1	4–0	4–0	0–2	3–0	3–2
Oldham Athletic	1–1	4–1	3–0	4–0	4–0	1–0	2–1	0–1	0–0	0–1		3–1	1–1	1–0	0–1	1–3	2–0	4–1	4–1	1–0	5–0	6–2	1–1	3–0
Orient	1–0	3–2	0–2	3–3	1–2	4–1	0–1	1–1	4–2	2–0	2–2		2–1	1–1	0–0	3–2	3–1	2–2	1–0	0–0	0–0	0–2	1–1	2–1
Oxford United	1–1	1–2	4–1	1–1	3–2	6–1	1–1	3–1	2–1	1–1	3–1	0–0		0–3	2–1	1–3	2–1	2–1	2–3	0–0	2–2	1–2	0–0	3–0
Peterborough United	2–0	2–1	1–1	2–1	2–0	3–3	2–0	2–1	3–1	1–2	3–1	0–2	2–3		0–2	2–1	1–0	0–2	4–4	1–2	0–1	2–1	2–2	3–0
Queens Park Rangers	4–0	3–0	3–0	2–1	4–0	6–0	2–0	5–1	0–0	4–0	0–1	4–1	3–1	0–0		2–1	5–1	2–2	4–2	3–1	2–1	0–0	4–1	4–1
Reading	0–0	1–1	1–2	2–3	1–0	4–0	2–1	6–0	2–2	0–0	2–1	1–0	1–2	2–2	2–2		4–0	2–0	2–0	2–1	2–1	3–1	1–1	2–0
Scunthorpe United	0–1	0–1	3–1	3–1	2–0	2–1	1–2	0–0	2–1	3–2	1–1	2–2	2–2	1–0	0–2	0–2		2–0	4–3	1–2	3–1	2–0	1–0	4–1
Shrewsbury Town	4–1	0–0	3–4	2–1	3–0	2–1	3–1	0–1	1–0	1–0	3–1	6–1	1–0	1–1	0–0	1–0	4–3		2–2	3–1	3–2	1–2	1–1	3–1
Swansea Town	0–1	1–1	2–2	1–0	1–1	6–0	1–1	2–0	0–1	4–4	3–0	2–0	0–1	3–3	1–3	5–2	0–1	5–2		2–2	0–0	4–1	2–2	5–2
Swindon Town	1–0	1–1	0–1	1–1	4–0	0–1	2–0	3–1	3–1	4–1	6–3	5–1	3–0	4–1	1–1	0–1	2–1	2–2	4–0		0–0	3–2	1–2	3–0
Torquay United	3–2	5–0	2–1	5–0	2–0	4–0	4–1	3–1	1–2	2–1	4–0	1–1	1–0	1–0	1–1	3–0	1–1	0–2	2–4	1–0		5–2	1–0	5–1
Walsall	3–0	2–1	1–1	1–0	1–1	4–0	3–0	1–0	1–2	2–1	1–1	1–1	2–0	1–1	2–0	3–1	2–0	2–2	1–1	1–1	0–1		0–1	2–0
Watford	3–0	1–1	3–1	0–0	2–0	4–1	1–1	3–1	0–1	2–0	2–2	1–3	2–0	3–1	1–0	1–0	0–1	1–0	1–1	2–0	2–1	2–1		2–1
Workington	0–0	2–1	0–2	1–0	1–2	3–1	1–3	2–1	2–4	1–2	1–1	3–1	0–0	1–0	0–2	1–2	1–0	2–3	6–3	1–3	1–2	4–0	1–2	

Updated to match(es) played on unknown. Source: Ian Laschke: Rothmans Book of Football League Records 1888–89 to 1978–79. Macdonald and Jane’s, London & Sydney, 1980.
Legend: Blue = home team win; Yellow = draw; Red = away team win.

=== Maps ===
Locations of the Football League Third Division London teams 1966–1967
Locations of the Football League Third Division teams 1966–1967

== Fourth Division ==
Football League Fourth Division
- Season: 1966–67
- Champions: Stockport County (1st title)
- Promoted: Barrow, Southport, Tranmere Rovers
- Failed re-election: none
- Matches: 552
- Goals: 1,500 (2.72 per match)
- Top goalscorer: Ernie Phythian (Hartlepools United), 23

Pos	Team	Pld	W	D	L	GF	GA	GAv	Pts	Promotion or relegation
1	Stockport County (C, P)	46	26	12	8	69	42	1.643	64	Promotion to the Third Division
2	Southport (P)	46	23	13	10	69	42	1.643	59	Promotion to the Third Division
3	Barrow (P)	46	24	11	11	76	54	1.407	59	Promotion to the Third Division
4	Tranmere Rovers (P)	46	22	14	10	66	43	1.535	58	Promotion to the Third Division
5	Crewe Alexandra	46	21	12	13	70	55	1.273	54	
6	Southend United	46	22	9	15	70	49	1.429	53	
7	Wrexham	46	16	20	10	76	62	1.226	52	
8	Hartlepools United	46	22	7	17	66	64	1.031	51	
9	Brentford	46	18	13	15	58	56	1.036	49	
10	Aldershot	46	18	12	16	72	57	1.263	48	
11	Bradford City	46	19	10	17	74	62	1.194	48	
12	Halifax Town	46	15	14	17	59	68	0.868	44	
13	Port Vale	46	14	15	17	55	58	0.948	43	
14	Exeter City	46	14	15	17	50	60	0.833	43	
15	Chesterfield	46	17	8	21	60	63	0.952	42	
16	Barnsley	46	13	15	18	60	64	0.938	41	
17	Luton Town	46	16	9	21	59	73	0.808	41	
18	Newport County	46	12	16	18	56	63	0.889	40	
19	Chester	46	15	10	21	54	78	0.692	40	
20	Notts County	46	13	11	22	53	72	0.736	37	
21	Rochdale	46	13	11	22	53	75	0.707	37	Re-elected
22	York City	46	12	11	23	65	79	0.823	35	Re-elected
23	Bradford (Park Avenue)	46	11	13	22	52	79	0.658	35	Re-elected
24	Lincoln City	46	9	13	24	58	82	0.707	31	Re-elected

Source: rsssf.com
(C) Champions; (P) Promoted

=== Results ===
Home \ Away	ALD	BAR	BRW	BRA	BPA	BRE	CHE	CHF	CRE	EXE	HAL	HAR	LIN	LUT	NPC	NTC	PTV	ROC	STD	SOU	STP	TRA	WRE	YOR
Aldershot		3–2	0–1	0–3	1–2	3–1	3–0	4–0	1–0	1–0	0–1	1–1	1–0	4–1	5–0	4–1	0–1	4–0	5–2	4–1	1–1	1–1	2–0	0–0
Barnsley	1–1		2–3	1–1	2–0	0–1	1–2	0–3	1–0	2–1	4–1	1–2	2–1	2–1	1–1	0–0	1–0	3–1	1–2	0–0	1–2	2–2	2–2	0–1
Barrow	1–1	2–0		0–1	1–0	1–0	1–1	2–1	3–2	5–0	1–0	2–3	2–1	3–0	1–0	0–1	2–2	2–0	1–0	2–2	1–1	0–0	1–1	1–1
Bradford City	4–1	1–1	5–2		2–3	2–0	2–3	3–1	0–3	1–1	1–2	3–0	2–1	2–1	1–2	3–1	2–0	4–1	2–1	3–3	0–1	1–0	3–3	1–0
Bradford Park Avenue	1–1	1–3	0–1	2–0		2–2	2–3	2–0	1–4	2–2	1–0	1–2	2–1	0–0	3–1	4–1	1–1	0–3	1–2	0–0	0–1	2–3	1–3	1–0
Brentford	1–0	3–1	0–3	2–0	1–1		4–0	1–0	0–2	3–1	1–0	1–2	2–2	1–0	1–1	1–0	2–0	4–0	1–1	2–1	2–1	1–1	1–1	1–1
Chester	0–0	1–0	1–1	1–0	0–3	1–2		2–1	0–3	0–2	0–2	1–0	0–1	0–0	4–2	1–2	1–3	3–2	1–1	2–1	1–1	0–1	1–3	3–1
Chesterfield	1–1	1–0	1–2	0–1	4–1	3–0	0–2		0–0	1–0	1–1	1–0	3–1	0–0	0–1	1–1	2–1	0–0	2–1	2–1	2–1	3–1	4–0	1–0
Crewe Alexandra	2–1	2–2	3–2	1–0	1–3	1–0	3–1	2–1		2–2	1–1	1–2	3–0	3–1	3–2	4–1	1–0	2–1	1–0	1–1	1–1	1–2	1–2	2–0
Exeter City	1–1	0–3	1–2	2–2	4–1	1–0	2–0	1–1	2–0		3–2	1–0	1–0	2–1	0–0	1–0	0–1	0–0	0–1	0–0	0–3	1–4	4–1	3–1
Halifax Town	2–2	1–1	1–4	2–2	0–0	3–2	2–1	1–0	1–0	0–0		2–1	0–0	1–1	2–2	5–2	2–2	1–1	2–2	2–0	0–1	2–1	3–1	2–1
Hartlepools United	3–2	1–1	2–1	1–0	2–0	2–2	3–2	3–2	1–2	3–1	1–3		5–0	2–1	0–1	2–1	2–1	2–1	1–2	1–1	1–0	0–2	2–1	4–2
Lincoln City	0–4	0–1	2–1	1–4	2–2	3–1	2–3	2–1	1–1	1–1	3–3	3–0		8–1	2–2	2–1	0–1	0–2	2–2	0–4	0–1	2–0	1–1	2–2
Luton Town	4–0	1–1	3–1	0–0	2–2	3–0	1–0	3–2	2–1	4–0	2–0	0–2	2–1		3–1	2–5	1–1	3–1	1–0	0–0	0–3	2–0	3–1	5–1
Newport County	1–2	2–0	0–1	1–1	0–0	1–1	2–3	4–1	2–1	3–2	3–0	0–2	0–0	2–0		1–0	1–1	2–2	3–0	0–0	1–1	1–2	1–1	4–2
Notts County	3–0	0–3	2–2	1–3	2–1	3–2	3–0	0–2	1–1	0–1	2–1	0–0	2–1	1–2	2–1		0–0	2–0	1–0	0–1	2–2	0–0	2–2	2–0
Port Vale	0–2	3–1	2–1	3–2	0–0	1–3	1–1	2–3	1–1	2–0	0–1	0–0	2–2	1–0	2–0	0–0		5–0	1–3	2–1	0–2	1–1	0–2	4–1
Rochdale	2–1	1–1	1–3	0–1	1–0	1–3	0–1	2–1	0–1	1–0	3–0	3–2	1–0	3–0	2–0	1–1	1–2		1–2	1–1	1–0	1–2	1–3	2–2
Southend United	4–0	3–0	1–3	2–1	4–0	3–0	5–1	4–1	1–1	0–0	1–0	2–0	3–0	2–0	1–0	1–0	4–1	0–0		0–1	0–1	0–0	1–1	2–1
Southport	1–0	3–0	4–1	2–1	1–0	2–0	4–3	1–2	4–1	1–1	2–0	3–1	2–1	4–1	1–0	2–1	0–0	1–2	1–0		4–0	1–0	1–0	2–0
Stockport County	1–0	2–1	2–1	1–0	4–0	1–2	1–1	3–1	1–1	1–0	2–1	2–0	4–5	1–0	0–0	2–0	1–1	2–2	4–1	1–0		1–0	1–0	3–1
Tranmere Rovers	2–2	3–3	1–2	3–1	2–2	0–0	0–0	1–0	5–0	1–1	1–0	2–0	1–0	1–0	2–1	3–0	2–1	3–1	1–2	1–2	3–0		2–1	2–1
Wrexham	2–0	2–2	1–1	1–1	6–0	0–0	3–1	3–2	1–1	0–0	4–0	4–1	0–0	2–0	2–2	3–2	2–1	4–2	2–0	1–1	2–2	0–0		1–1
York City	1–2	0–3	1–2	4–1	3–1	0–0	1–1	1–1	0–2	2–4	4–3	1–1	3–1	5–1	2–1	4–1	3–1	1–1	2–1	2–0	1–2	0–1	4–0	

Updated to match(es) played on unknown. Source: Ian Laschke: Rothmans Book of Football League Records 1888–89 to 1978–79. Macdonald and Jane’s, London & Sydney, 1980.
Legend: Blue = home team win; Yellow = draw; Red = away team win.

=== Maps ===
Locations of the Football League Fourth Division teams 1966–1967

== Attendances ==
=== First Division ===
#	Football club	Home games	Average attendance
1	Manchester United	21	53,854
2	Liverpool FC	21	46,388
3	Everton FC	21	42,606
4	Tottenham Hotspur	21	41,988
5	Chelsea FC	21	35,591
6	Leeds United	21	35,221
7	Newcastle United	21	32,081
8	Arsenal FC	21	31,773
9	Sunderland AFC	21	31,731
10	Nottingham Forest	21	31,282
11	Manchester City	21	31,208
12	Sheffield Wednesday	21	30,219
13	West Ham United	21	29,271
14	Stoke City	21	25,933
15	Southampton FC	21	25,527
16	Leicester City	21	24,463
17	Fulham FC	21	24,430
18	West Bromwich Albion	21	23,342
19	Aston Villa	21	21,628
20	Sheffield United	21	20,600
21	Burnley FC	21	20,508
22	Blackpool FC	21	17,283

=== Second Division ===
#	Football club	Home games	Average attendance
1	Coventry City FC	21	28,245
2	Wolverhampton Wanderers FC	21	24,787
3	Hull City AFC	21	24,730
4	Birmingham City FC	21	19,798
5	Crystal Palace FC	21	18,100
6	Bristol City FC	21	16,183
7	Millwall FC	21	16,166
8	Derby County FC	21	15,867
9	Ipswich Town FC	21	15,835
10	Norwich City FC	21	14,945
11	Huddersfield Town AFC	21	14,904
12	Portsmouth FC	21	14,805
13	Blackburn Rovers FC	21	14,721
14	Preston North End FC	21	14,350
15	Plymouth Argyle FC	21	14,281
16	Bolton Wanderers FC	21	13,235
17	Charlton Athletic FC	21	12,611
18	Northampton Town FC	21	12,310
19	Carlisle United FC	21	11,201
20	Rotherham United FC	21	10,344
21	Cardiff City FC	21	10,259
22	Bury FC	21	8,076

=== Third Division ===
#	Football club	Home games	Average attendance
1	Middlesbrough FC	21	17,586
2	Queens Park Rangers FC	21	13,157
3	Swindon Town FC	21	12,467
4	Brighton & Hove Albion FC	21	11,785
5	Bristol Rovers FC	21	10,253
6	Oldham Athletic FC	21	9,940
7	Watford FC	21	9,385
8	Walsall FC	21	8,594
9	Doncaster Rovers FC	21	7,906
10	Mansfield Town FC	21	7,800
11	Oxford United FC	21	7,405
12	Reading FC	21	7,119
13	Torquay United FC	21	7,040
14	Darlington FC	21	6,591
15	Gillingham FC	21	6,548
16	Peterborough United FC	21	6,466
17	Swansea City AFC	21	6,347
18	Leyton Orient FC	21	5,981
19	Grimsby Town FC	21	5,937
20	Colchester United FC	21	5,567
21	AFC Bournemouth	21	5,332
22	Scunthorpe United FC	21	5,239
23	Shrewsbury Town FC	21	4,936
24	Workington AFC	21	2,664

=== Fourth Division ===
#	Football club	Home games	Average attendance
1	Stockport County FC	21	9,820
2	Wrexham AFC	21	8,523
3	Southend United FC	21	8,012
4	Tranmere Rovers	21	7,839
5	Brentford FC	21	6,663
6	Luton Town FC	21	6,035
7	Hartlepool United FC	21	5,778
8	Barrow AFC	21	5,770
9	Barnsley FC	21	5,508
10	Crewe Alexandra FC	21	5,396
11	Southport FC	21	5,362
12	Chester City FC	21	5,156
13	Chesterfield FC	21	5,115
14	Port Vale FC	21	5,074
15	Bradford City AFC	21	4,826
16	Bradford Park Avenue AFC	21	4,802
17	Aldershot Town FC	21	4,483
18	Notts County FC	21	4,354
19	Lincoln City FC	21	4,088
20	Exeter City FC	21	3,990
21	Halifax Town AFC	21	3,886
22	York City FC	21	3,776
23	Newport County AFC	21	2,869
24	Rochdale AFC	21	2,442

== See also ==
- 1966-67 in English football
