= Joe Livingstone =

English footballer

Joseph Livingstone
Personal information
- Date of birth: 18 June 1942
- Place of birth: Middlesbrough, England
- Date of death: 2 August 2009 (aged 67)
- Place of death: New Marske, England
- Position: Striker

Senior career*
Years	Team	Apps	(Gls)
1960–1962	Middlesbrough	20	(7)
1962–1966	Carlisle United	82	(42)
1966–1967	Hartlepool United	15	(5)
Total		117	(54)
- * Club domestic league appearances and goals

Joseph Livingstone (18 June 1942 – 2 August 2009) was an English footballer who played as a forward from 1960 to 1967 for Middlesbrough, Carlisle United and Hartlepool United. A tall and stocky player, he was known for his physical strength.

== Career ==
He began his professional career in 1960 at his hometown club Middlesbrough, where he was understudy to star striker Brian Clough. In total, Livingstone scored seven goals in 22 appearances for Boro, before moving on to Carlisle United in November 1962.

At Carlisle, Livingstone scored an impressive 42 goals in 82 league appearances for the club, during a four-year spell. He finished his career at Hartlepool United where his old Middlesbrough teammate Brian Clough was now manager.

== Death ==
Livingstone retired from professional football in 1967, and ran a pub in Middlesbrough with his wife following his retirement from the game. He died in August 2009, following a long illness

== Personal life ==
His son, Steve Livingstone, was also a professional footballer, and spent the majority of his career at Grimsby Town. His grandson Ged also had a trial with Grimsby in 2009.
