= Stan Storton =

English footballer and manager

Personal information
- Full name: Stanley Eugene Storton
- Date of birth: 5 January 1939 (age 87)
- Place of birth: Keighley, England
- Position: Full back

Youth career
- –1959: Huddersfield Town

Senior career*
Years	Team	Apps	(Gls)
1959–1963	Bradford City	111	(5)
1963–1964	Darlington	15	(0)
1964–1966	Hartlepool United	72	(0)
1966–1970	Tranmere Rovers	123	(2)
1970–1973	Ellesmere Port Town		
Total		321	(7)

Managerial career
- 1972–1973: Ellesmere Port Town
- 1973–1979: Runcorn
- 1979–1980: Bangor City
- 1980–1981: Northwich Victoria
- 1981–1989: Telford United
- * Club domestic league appearances and goals

Stanley Eugene Storton (born 5 January 1939) is an English former football player and manager.

== Personal life ==
Born in Keighley, Storton is the older brother of fellow professional player Trevor Storton. Following his management career, Storton ran an office cleaning firm in Ellesmere Port.

== Career ==
=== Playing career ===
Storton, who played as a full back, began his career at Huddersfield Town as an amateur. He turned professional in 1959, appearing in the Football League for Bradford City, Darlington, Hartlepool United and Tranmere Rovers, before dropping into non-league football with Ellesmere Port Town.

=== Coaching career ===
After retiring as a player, Storton managed a number teams including Ellesmere Port Town, Runcorn, Bangor City, Northwich Victoria and Telford United.

== Honours ==
Individual

Football Conference Manager of the Month: October 1986
