= Cliff Wright (footballer) =

English footballer (1944–2022)

Personal information
- Full name: George Clifford Wright
- Date of birth: 18 October 1944
- Place of birth: Lingdale, Yorkshire, England
- Date of death: 8 October 2022 (aged 77)
- Place of death: Italy
- Position: Midfielder

Youth career
- Middlesbrough

Senior career*
Years	Team	Apps	(Gls)
1962–1964	Middlesbrough	0	(0)
1964–1970	Hartlepools United	184	(31)
1970–1971	Darlington	16	(4)
1971–1975	Boston United	130	(14)
- * Club domestic league appearances and goals

George Clifford Wright (18 October 1944 – 8 October 2022) is an English former footballer who played as a midfielder in the Football League for Hartlepools United and Darlington. He began his career as an apprentice with Middlesbrough, but never played for them in the league, and after leaving Darlington spent four-and-a-half seasons with Northern Premier League club Boston United.

He was a member of the Hartlepool team promoted to the Third Division for the first time in 1967–68.

Wright died aged 77 while on holiday in Italy.
