= Jimmy Mulvaney (footballer, born 1941) =

English footballer

Personal information
- Full name: James Mulvaney
- Date of birth: 13 May 1941
- Place of birth: Sunderland, England
- Date of death: 15 September 1982 (aged 41)
- Position: Forward

Senior career*
Years	Team	Apps	(Gls)
1964–1965	Whitby Town		
1965–1967	Hartlepools United	67	(31)
1967–1970	Barrow	79	(33)
1970–1972	Stockport County	40	(8)
Total		188	(72)
- * Club domestic league appearances and goals

James Mulvaney (13 May 1941 – 15 August 1982) was an English professional footballer who played in the Football League for Barrow, Hartlepools United and Stockport County.
