= Peter Thompson (footballer, born 1936) =

English footballer (1936–2025)

Personal information
- Full name: Peter Thompson
- Date of birth: 16 February 1936
- Place of birth: Blackhall Colliery, England
- Date of death: 18 February 2025 (aged 89)
- Place of death: Sunderland, England
- Position: Centre forward

Senior career*
Years	Team	Apps	(Gls)
- Blackhall Colliery Welfare
1955–1957	Wrexham	42	(21)
1957–1958	Hartlepool United	47	(22)
1958–1962	Derby County	52	(19)
1962–1963	Bournemouth	39	(14)
1963–1966	Hartlepool United	91	(34)
- Boston United

International career
	England Amateur	4	(?)
- * Club domestic league appearances and goals

Peter Thompson (16 February 1936 – 18 February 2025) was an English footballer who played as a centre forward. He played most of his career as a full professional in the English Football League, however did make appearances for England Amateur during his amateur playing days.

== Career ==
Starting out at hometown club Blackhall Colliery Welfare, Thompson was signed by Wrexham as an amateur.

Thompson spent two years at the Welsh club, with an impressive record of a goal every two games.

In 1957, he moved to Hartlepool United, where in his first season he was their top scorer with 16 goals.

His form earned him a move to Derby County in 1958, where he spent 4 years.

In 1962, he moved to Bournemouth, where he spent a season before returning to Hartlepool.

His second spell at Hartlepool was a success, being their top scorer again for the 1963–64 and 1964–65 seasons. In 1966 he left Hartlepool to join non-league side Boston United.

== Death ==
Thompson died on 18 February 2025, two days after his 89th birthday.
