= Tony Bircumshaw =

English footballer

Personal information
- Date of birth: 8 February 1945 (age 81)
- Place of birth: Mansfield, England
- Position: Full back

Senior career*
Years	Team	Apps	(Gls)
1962–1966	Notts County	148	(1)
1966–1971	Hartlepools United	183	(11)
- * Club domestic league appearances and goals

Tony Bircumshaw (born 8 February 1945 in Mansfield, England) is a former footballer who played in the full back position.

Bircumshaw was a product of the youth system at Notts County where his older brother Peter Bircumshaw was already a first team regular. Tony Bircumshaw made his Football League debut on 3 April 1961 for Notts County at Brentford and at 16 years and 54 days he set a record as the club's youngest player. The record remains in place to date, although he was outstripped for the all competitions record when Jermaine Pennant featured for the club in an FA Cup tie as a 15-year-old.

Bircumshaw left Notts in July 1966, to move to Hartlepools United, remaining at the club until 1971. Whilst there, he was a member of the side that won promotion in the 1967–68 season.
