= Ernie Phythian =

English footballer (1942–2020)

Personal information
- Full name: Ernest Rixon Phythian
- Date of birth: 16 July 1942
- Place of birth: Farnworth, England
- Date of death: 3 August 2020 (aged 78)
- Place of death: Johannesburg, South Africa
- Position: Striker

Youth career
- Bolton Wanderers

Senior career*
Years	Team	Apps	(Gls)
1960–1961	Bolton Wanderers	10	(3)
1962–1965	Wrexham	134	(44)
1965–1968	Hartlepools United	124	(51)
- Southern Suburbs
Total		268	(98)

International career
- England Youth
- * Club domestic league appearances and goals

Ernest Rixon Phythian (16 July 1942 – 3 August 2020) was an English professional footballer who played as a striker. Active between 1960 and 1968, Phythian made over 250 appearances in the Football League, scoring nearly 100 goals.

== Early and personal life ==
Born in Farnworth, Phythian was related to footballer Jimmy Seddon and referee Ken Seddon.

== Career ==
As a child he captained Farnworth Schoolboys and played for Lancashire Schoolboys. He also played cricket for North of England Schools and for various clubs around Bolton.

He began his career with Bolton Wanderers as an amateur at the age of 15, initially combining his football career with work as an apprentice toolmaker. He made his first-team debut in 1960, aged 17.

He later played for Wrexham and Hartlepools United before moving to South Africa to play with Southern Suburbs.

He was also an England Youth international.

== Later life and death ==
He died on 3 August 2020, aged 78, in Johannesburg, South Africa.
