= 1955–56 Chester F.C. season =

Chester
1955–56 season
- Manager: Louis Page
- Stadium: Sealand Road
- Football League Third Division North: 17th
- FA Cup: First round
- Welsh Cup: Quarterfinal
- Top goalscorer: League: George Allman (12); All: George Allman (12)
- Highest home attendance: 15,202 vs Wrexham (1 October)
- Lowest home attendance: 3,221 vs Barrow (4 February)
- Average home league attendance: 6,640; 14th in division
Home colours

The 1955–56 season was the 18th season of competitive association football in the Football League played by Chester, an English club based in Chester, Cheshire.

It was the club's 18th consecutive season in the Third Division North since the election to the Football League. Alongside competing in the league, the club also participated in the FA Cup and the Welsh Cup.

== Football League ==
Pos	Team	Pld	W	D	L	GF	GA	GAv	Pts
15	Darlington	46	16	9	21	60	73	0.822	41
16	Tranmere Rovers	46	16	9	21	59	84	0.702	41
17	Chester	46	13	14	19	52	82	0.634	40
18	Mansfield Town	46	14	11	21	84	81	1.037	39
19	Halifax Town	46	14	11	21	66	76	0.868	39

Source: rsssf.com

=== Results summary ===
Overall								Home						Away					
Pld	W	D	L	GF	GA	GAv	Pts	W	D	L	GF	GA	Pts	W	D	L	GF	GA	Pts
46	13	14	19	52	82	0.634	40	10	8	5	35	33	28	3	6	14	17	49	12

Source: rsssf.com

=== Results by matchday ===
Round	1	2	3	4	5	6	7	8	9	10	11	12	13	14	15	16	17	18	19	20	21	22	23	24	25	26	27	28	29	30	31	32	33	34	35	36	37	38	39	40	41	42	43	44	45	46
Result	D	L	L	W	W	D	W	D	D	L	W	D	W	D	W	W	W	L	L	L	L	L	L	L	W	D	W	L	W	D	D	L	W	D	D	L	W	D	W	L	D	L	L	L	D	L
Position	8	20	24	21	14	14	9	7	10	14	11	12	8	8	7	8	6	11	12	13	14	18	19	20	18	18	18	18	18	18	18	18	18	17	17	18	17	17	16	17	16	16	18	18	17	17

Source: statto.com
W = Win; D = Draw; L = Loss

=== Matches ===
Date	Opponents	Venue	Result	Score	Scorers	Attendance
20 August	Tranmere Rovers	H	D	0–0		9,784
23 August	Grimsby Town	A	L	1–6	Lee (pen.)	10,873
27 August	Southport	A	L	0–1		4,109
31 August	Grimsby Town	H	W	2–0	Bullock, Haines	6,193
3 September	Gateshead	H	W	3–0	Allman (2), Collins	7,900
7 September	Bradford Park Avenue	H	D	0–0		8,801
10 September	Darlington	A	W	1–0	Wayman	8,714
12 September	Bradford Park Avenue	A	D	1–1	Allman	4,081
17 September	Accrington Stanley	H	D	1–1	Collins	10,994
21 September	Rochdale	A	L	2–4	Jolley, Lee	2,936
24 September	Barrow	A	W	2–1	Collins (2)	6,313
28 September	Carlisle United	H	D	3–3	Collins (2), Allman	7,916
1 October	Wrexham	H	W	2–1	Haines (2)	15,202
8 October	Bradford City	A	D	1–1	Allman	12,122
15 October	Mansfield Town	H	W	4–3	Collins (2), Allman, Haines	7,709
22 October	Oldham Athletic	A	L	1–4	Allman	8,240
29 October	Workington	H	L	1–0	Collins	7,167
5 November	York City	A	L	0–3		8,176
12 November	Derby County	H	L	2–5	Collins, Allman	10,182
26 November	Hartlepools United	H	L	0–1		5,876
3 December	Stockport County	A	L	1–2	Brandon	5,737
17 December	Tranmere Rovers	A	L	0–4		4,889
24 December	Southport	H	L	1–3	Haines	3,531
26 December	Chesterfield	A	L	1–2	Hackett	5,815
27 December	Chesterfield	H	W	2–1	Hackett, Bullock	4,331
31 December	Gateshead	A	D	1–1	Wayman	3,007
14 January	Darlington	H	W	2–1	Bullock, Pye	4,509
21 January	Accrington Stanley	A	L	0–4		6,862
4 February	Barrow	H	W	1–0	Allman	3,221
11 February	Wrexham	A	D	0–0		6,673
18 February	Bradford City	H	D	1–1	Hackett	3,829
25 February	Mansfield Town	A	L	0–3		7,693
3 March	Oldham Athletic	H	W	3–2	Hackett, Haines, Whitlock	4,935
10 March	Workington	A	D	0–0		5,926
17 March	Crewe Alexandra	H	D	0–0		6,863
24 March	Derby County	A	L	1–3	Bullock	16,378
30 March	Halifax Town	H	W	1–0	Haines	5,881
31 March	York City	H	D	2–2	Brandon, Collins	6,016
2 April	Halifax Town	A	W	1–0	Brandon	4,445
7 April	Hartlepools United	A	L	1–3	Lee	6,646
11 April	Crewe Alexandra	A	D	0–0		3,076
14 April	Stockport County	H	L	1–4	Allman	4,425
21 April	Scunthorpe & Lindsey United	A	L	1–2	Allman	4,452
24 April	Carlisle United	A	L	1–4	Haines	3,872
28 April	Rochdale	H	D	0–0		4,213
2 May	Scunthorpe & Lindsey United	H	L	3–5	Jolley (2), Allman	3,253

== FA Cup ==
Round	Date	Opponents	Venue	Result	Score	Scorers	Attendance
First round	19 November	Chesterfield (3N)	A	L	0–1		9,801

== Welsh Cup ==
Round	Date	Opponents	Venue	Result	Score	Scorers	Attendance
Fifth round	26 January	Rhyl (CCL)	A	W	2–0	Hackett (2)	
Quarterfinal	1 March	Swansea Town (2)	H	L	0–1		

== Season statistics ==
Nat	Player	Total		League		FA Cup		Welsh Cup	
Nat	Player	A	G	A	G	A	G	A	G
Goalkeepers
(England)	Keith Griffiths	6	–	6	–	–	–	–	–
(England)	Bobby Jones	43	–	40	–	1	–	2	–
Field players
(England)	George Allman	42	12	39	12	1	–	2	–
	Brian Blears	1	–	1	–	–	–	–	–
	Ken Brandon	15	3	14	3	1	–	–	–
	Norman Bullock	36	4	34	4	–	–	2	–
	Jim Collins	45	11	43	11	1	–	1	–
(England)	John Devine	1	–	1	–	–	–	–	–
	Mike Fields	4	–	4	–	–	–	–	–
(England)	Ray Gill	48	–	45	–	1	–	2	–
	Ken Fletcher	11	–	10	–	1	–	–	–
	Ray Griffiths	6	–	6	–	–	–	–	–
	Bernard Hackett	19	6	17	4	–	–	2	2
(England)	Jack Haines	44	8	41	8	1	–	2	–
(Wales)	Ron Hughes	45	–	43	–	–	–	2	–
(England)	Charlie Jolley	7	3	7	3	–	–	–	–
(England)	Eric Lee	47	3	44	3	1	–	2	–
(England)	Alan Mayers	1	–	1	–	–	–	–	–
	Sam Morris	8	–	6	–	1	–	1	–
	Billy Pye	5	1	5	1	–	–	–	–
	Tommy Roberts	5	–	5	–	–	–	–	–
(England)	Harry Smith	25	–	25	–	–	–	–	–
	Fred Tomley	1	–	1	–	–	–	–	–
	Frank Wayman	33	2	30	2	1	–	2	–
	Phil Whitlock	41	1	38	1	1	–	2	–
	Own goals	–	–	–	–	–	–	–	–
	Total	49	54	46	52	1	–	2	2
