= 1954–55 Chester F.C. season =

Chester
1954–55 season
- Manager: Louis Page
- Stadium: Sealand Road
- Football League Third Division North: 24th (re-elected)
- FA Cup: First round
- Welsh Cup: Final
- Top goalscorer: League: Ron Hughes (9); All: Billy Pye (12)
- Highest home attendance: 12,044 vs Wrexham (25 August)
- Lowest home attendance: 1,723 vs Hartlepools United (29 April)
- Average home league attendance: 5,390; 19th in division
Home colours

The 1954–55 season was the 17th season of competitive association football in the Football League played by Chester, an English club based in Chester, Cheshire.

It was the club's 17th consecutive season in the Third Division North since the election to the Football League. Alongside competing in the league, the club also participated in the FA Cup and the Welsh Cup.

== Football League ==
Pos	Team	Pld	W	D	L	GF	GA	GAv	Pts	Promotion or relegation
20	Carlisle United	46	15	6	25	78	89	0.876	36	
21	Bradford City	46	13	10	23	47	55	0.855	36	
22	Crewe Alexandra	46	10	14	22	68	91	0.747	34	
23	Grimsby Town	46	13	8	25	47	78	0.603	34	Re-elected
24	Chester	46	12	9	25	44	77	0.571	33	Re-elected

Source: rsssf.com

=== Results summary ===
Overall								Home						Away					
Pld	W	D	L	GF	GA	GAv	Pts	W	D	L	GF	GA	Pts	W	D	L	GF	GA	Pts
46	12	9	25	44	77	0.571	33	10	3	10	23	25	23	2	6	15	21	52	10

Source: rsssf.com

=== Results by matchday ===
Round	1	2	3	4	5	6	7	8	9	10	11	12	13	14	15	16	17	18	19	20	21	22	23	24	25	26	27	28	29	30	31	32	33	34	35	36	37	38	39	40	41	42	43	44	45	46
Result	D	W	W	L	L	L	L	W	L	W	W	L	W	D	L	L	L	L	L	W	L	L	W	L	L	L	W	D	L	L	W	L	W	D	W	D	D	L	L	L	L	D	D	D	L	L
Position	8	5	2	5	14	16	20	16	19	15	13	15	13	13	15	16	18	20	22	21	21	22	21	22	23	23	21	20	21	24	22	23	20	20	19	18	17	18	21	23	23	23	22	21	24	24

Source: statto.com
W = Win; D = Draw; L = Loss

=== Matches ===
Date	Opponents	Venue	Result	Score	Scorers	Attendance
21 August	Tranmere Rovers	A	D	1–1	Hughes	10,244
25 August	Wrexham	H	W	1–0	Capper (o.g.)	12,044
28 August	Stockport County	H	W	1–0	M. Wright	7,431
1 September	Wrexham	A	L	1–2	Halstead	15,495
4 September	Hartlepools United	A	L	1–3	Windle	7,909
8 September	Grimsby Town	A	L	1–3	Halstead	10,128
11 September	Gateshead	H	L	1–2	Gill	5,801
15 September	Grimsby Town	H	W	1–0	Hughes	5,133
18 September	Darlington	A	L	1–4	M. Wright	10,446
21 September	Carlisle United	A	W	2–1	Hughes (2)	5,607
25 September	Chesterfield	H	W	1–0	Halstead	6,735
29 September	Carlisle United	H	L	1–2	Hughes	5,354
2 October	Crewe Alexandra	A	W	3–1	Hughes (3)	7,159
9 October	Accrington Stanley	H	D	1–1	Brandon	8,670
16 October	Mansfield Town	A	L	1–2	M. Wright	9,464
23 October	Workington	H	L	0–2		6,170
30 October	Barrow	A	L	0–2		4,620
13 November	York City	A	L	0–5		6,824
27 November	Oldham Athletic	A	L	1–2	Halstead	7,593
4 December	Bradford City	H	W	1–0	Windle	3,285
11 December	Halifax Town	H	L	1–3	M. Wright	3,712
18 December	Tranmere Rovers	H	L	0–1		3,532
25 December	Bradford Park Avenue	H	W	2–0	Bullock (2)	3,203
27 December	Bradford Park Avenue	A	L	0–3		8,454
1 January	Stockport County	A	L	0–3		8,497
8 January	Scunthorpe & Lindsey United	H	L	2–4	Pye, Rolfe	4,083
15 January	Hartlepools United	H	W	1–0	Pye	1,723
29 January	Scunthorpe & Lindsey United	A	D	1–1	Smith	8,328
5 February	Darlington	H	L	0–2		4,419
12 February	Chesterfield	A	L	3–5	Pye, Coffin (2)	4,674
19 February	Crewe Alexandra	H	W	3–1	Pye, Coffin, Hughes	3,526
26 February	Accrington Stanley	A	L	0–3		7,999
5 March	Mansfield Town	H	W	1–0	Pye	4,864
12 March	Workington	A	D	1–1	Brandon	6,753
19 March	Barrow	H	W	3–1	Pye, Coffin, Brandon	4,371
26 March	Southport	A	D	1–1	Pye	1,317
30 March	Gateshead	A	D	0–0		887
2 April	York City	H	L	1–2	Pye	6,456
8 April	Rochdale	H	L	1–2	Smith	7,293
9 April	Halifax Town	A	L	1–3	Gill	6,980
11 April	Rochdale	A	L	0–2		6,466
16 April	Oldham Athletic	H	D	0–0		5,057
20 April	Southport	H	D	0–0		4,544
23 April	Bradford City	A	D	0–0		6,798
30 April	Barnsley	H	L	0–2		6,566
4 May	Barnsley	A	L	2–4	Brandon, Morrey	10,044

== FA Cup ==
Round	Date	Opponents	Venue	Result	Score	Scorers	Attendance
First round	20 November	Gateshead (3N)	A	L	0–6		8,643

== Welsh Cup ==
Round	Date	Opponents	Venue	Result	Score	Scorers	Attendance
Fifth round	13 January	Caernarfon Town (WLN)	A	D	1–1	Gill	
Fifth round replay	26 January	Caernarfon Town (WLN)	H	W	9–1	Rolfe (2), Pye (2), Hughes, Coffin, Smith, Brandon (2)	1,356
Quarterfinal	23 February	Flint Town United (WLN)	H	W	3–0	Pye, Smith (2)	3,900
Semifinal	13 April	Cardiff City (1)	N	W	2–0	Coffin (2, 1pen.)	7,951
Final	11 May	Barry Town (SFL)	N	D	1–1	Brandon	6,766
Final replay	14 May	Barry Town (SFL)	N	L	3–4	Pye, Molyneux, Brandon	8,450

== Season statistics ==
Nat	Player	Total		League		FA Cup		Welsh Cup	
Nat	Player	A	G	A	G	A	G	A	G
Goalkeepers
	Jack Hillier	8	–	6	–	–	–	2	–
(England)	Bobby Jones	34	–	31	–	–	–	3	–
(England)	Dick Wright	11	–	9	–	1	–	1	–
Field players
(Wales)	Tommy Astbury	16	–	16	–	–	–	–	–
	Brian Blears	1	–	1	–	–	–	–	–
	Ken Brandon	31	8	24	4	1	–	6	4
	Norman Bullock	23	2	22	2	1	–	–	–
	Geoff Coffin	33	7	29	4	–	–	4	3
	Ken Fletcher	10	–	8	–	–	–	2	–
(England)	Ray Gill	52	3	45	2	1	–	6	1
(England)	Roy Halstead	21	4	21	4	–	–	–	–
(Wales)	Ron Hughes	48	10	42	9	1	–	5	1
(England)	Eric Lee	41	–	37	–	1	–	3	–
(England)	Alan Mayers	1	–	-	–	–	–	1	–
	John Molyneux	53	1	46	–	1	–	6	1
	Bernard Morrey	16	1	13	1	–	–	3	–
	Sam Morris	27	–	22	–	1	–	4	–
	Billy Pye	24	12	18	8	–	–	6	4
	Jimmy Rolfe	38	3	33	1	1	–	4	2
(England)	Harry Smith	24	5	20	2	–	–	4	3
(England)	Fred Sutcliffe	2	–	1	–	1	–	–	–
	Phil Whitlock	28	–	21	–	1	–	6	–
	Billy Windle	20	2	20	2	–	–	–	–
	Monty Wright	21	4	21	4	–	–	–	–
	Own goals	–	1	–	1	–	–	–	–
	Total	53	63	46	44	1	–	6	19
