= 1953–54 Chester F.C. season =

Chester
1953–54 season
- Manager: Louis Page
- Stadium: Sealand Road
- Football League Third Division North: 24th (re-elected)
- FA Cup: First round
- Welsh Cup: Final
- Top goalscorer: League: Don Travis (12); All: Don Travis (16)
- Highest home attendance: 14,627 vs Wrexham (3 October)
- Lowest home attendance: 1,667 vs Mansfield Town (24 March)
- Average home league attendance: 5,503; 22nd in division
Home colours

The 1953–54 season was the 16th season of competitive association football in the Football League played by Chester, an English club based in Chester, Cheshire.

It was the club's 16th consecutive season in the Third Division North since the election to the Football League. Alongside competing in the league, the club also participated in the FA Cup and the Welsh Cup.

== Football League ==
Pos	Team	Pld	W	D	L	GF	GA	GAv	Pts	Promotion or relegation
20	Workington	46	13	14	19	59	80	0.738	40	
21	Darlington	46	12	14	20	50	71	0.704	38	
22	York City	46	12	13	21	64	86	0.744	37	
23	Halifax Town	46	12	10	24	44	73	0.603	34	Re-elected
24	Chester	46	11	10	25	48	67	0.716	32	Re-elected

Source: rsssf.com

=== Results summary ===
Overall								Home						Away					
Pld	W	D	L	GF	GA	GAv	Pts	W	D	L	GF	GA	Pts	W	D	L	GF	GA	Pts
46	11	10	25	48	67	0.716	32	10	7	6	39	22	27	1	3	19	9	45	5

Source: rsssf.com

=== Results by matchday ===
Round	1	2	3	4	5	6	7	8	9	10	11	12	13	14	15	16	17	18	19	20	21	22	23	24	25	26	27	28	29	30	31	32	33	34	35	36	37	38	39	40	41	42	43	44	45	46
Result	D	D	L	L	W	L	L	D	W	L	W	L	W	L	W	L	L	D	L	D	L	W	L	L	L	L	W	L	L	D	L	W	L	D	L	D	L	L	W	D	W	L	D	W	L	L
Position	14	14	18	21	18	17	21	21	19	20	16	19	18	18	17	18	21	19	20	19	20	19	19	20	20	20	20	21	24	22	24	23	24	24	24	24	24	24	24	24	24	24	24	24	24	24

Source: statto.com
W = Win; D = Draw; L = Loss

=== Matches ===
Date	Opponents	Venue	Result	Score	Scorers	Attendance
22 August	Hartlepools United	H	D	1–1	Windle	6,695
26 August	Barnsley	H	D	1–1	Windle	7,117
29 August	Gateshead	A	L	1–2	Travis	8,013
2 September	Barnsley	A	L	0–3		9,969
5 September	Workington	H	W	3–0	Coffin (2pens.), Pye	5,790
9 September	Darlington	A	L	0–1		4,875
12 September	Scunthorpe & Lindsey United	A	L	0–1		10,234
16 September	Darlington	H	D	2–2	Thomas, Travis	3,999
19 September	York City	H	W	3–1	Travis, Smith, Windle	5,571
23 September	Bradford Park Avenue	H	L	2–3	Coffin (2, 1pen.)	4,906
26 September	Southport	A	W	1–0	Pye	5,770
30 September	Bradford Park Avenue	A	L	0–5		5,333
3 October	Wrexham	H	W	2–1	Thomas, Travis	14,627
10 October	Barrow	A	L	1–2	Thomas	6,258
17 October	Bradford City	H	W	3–0	Thomas, Coffin (pen.), Travis	6,150
24 October	Chesterfield	A	L	0–4		8,229
31 October	Tranmere Rovers	H	L	1–2	Hilton	6,824
7 November	Halifax Town	A	L	1–1	Windle	3,297
14 November	Carlisle United	H	L	0–1		5,104
28 November	Grimsby Town	H	D	1–1	Molyneux	5,327
5 December	Stockport County	A	L	0–5		8,252
12 December	Rochdale	H	W	2–0	Thomas, Travis	3,578
19 December	Hartlepools United	A	L	0–2		5,481
25 December	Port Vale	A	L	0–1		15,322
26 December	Port Vale	H	L	0–1		10,979
28 December	Rochdale	A	L	0–4		7,226
2 January	Gateshead	H	W	5–0	Travis (3), Rolfe, Morrey	4,197
9 January	Mansfield Town	A	L	1–2	Morrey	6,572
16 January	Workington	A	L	0–2		7,212
23 January	Scunthorpe & Lindsey United	H	D	0–0		5,180
6 February	York City	A	L	1–2	Morrey (pen.)	3,960
13 February	Southport	H	W	1–0	Morrey	4,802
20 February	Wrexham	A	L	1–2	Basford	10,225
27 February	Barrow	H	D	1–1	Hilton	3,023
6 March	Bradford City	A	L	0–1		10,971
13 March	Chesterfield	H	D	2–2	Hilton, Lee	4,404
20 March	Tranmere Rovers	A	L	1–2	Coffin	6,773
24 March	Mansfield Town	H	L	0–2		1,667
27 March	Halifax Town	H	W	3–1	Morrey, Travis, Windle	3,207
3 April	Carlisle United	A	D	1–1	Travis	2,329
10 April	Accrington Stanley	H	W	3–0	Rolfe (2), Windle	4,031
16 April	Crewe Alexandra	A	L	0–1		6,287
17 April	Grimsby Town	A	D	0–0		7,330
19 April	Crewe Alexandra	H	W	2–0	Betteridge, Travis	5,846
24 April	Stockport County	H	L	1–2	Coffin	3,545
28 April	Accrington Stanley	A	L	0–1		4,687

== FA Cup ==
Round	Date	Opponents	Venue	Result	Score	Scorers	Attendance
First round	21 November	Stockport County (3N)	A	L	2–4	Molyneux, Windle	12,363

== Welsh Cup ==
Round	Date	Opponents	Venue	Result	Score	Scorers	Attendance
Fifth round	13 January	Brymbo Steelworks	H	W	6–1	Rolfe, Morrey (pen.), Morris, Smith, Travis	766
Quarterfinal	3 March	Wrexham (3N)	H	W	1–0	Travis	2,133
Semifinal	17 March	Newport County (3S)	N	D	2–2	Travis (2)	7,920
Semifinal replay	5 April	Newport County (3S)	N	W	2–0	Basford, Hilton	3,000
Final	21 April	Flint Town United (WLN)	N	L	0–2		15,584

== Season statistics ==
Nat	Player	Total		League		FA Cup		Welsh Cup	
Nat	Player	A	G	A	G	A	G	A	G
Goalkeepers
(England)	Bobby Jones	52	–	46	–	1	–	5	–
Field players
(Wales)	Tommy Astbury	19	–	16	–	1	–	2	–
	Jack Basford	13	2	10	1	–	–	3	1
	Mick Betteridge	9	1	8	1	–	–	1	–
	Ken Brandon	1	–	1	–	–	–	–	–
	Norman Bullock	1	–	1	–	–	–	–	–
	Geoff Coffin	22	7	21	7	–	–	1	–
	Ken Fletcher	19	1	16	–	–	–	3	1
(England)	Ray Gill	52	–	46	–	1	–	5	–
	Joe Hilton	24	4	20	3	1	–	3	1
(Wales)	Ron Hughes	45	–	39	–	1	–	5	–
(England)	Eric Lee	51	1	46	1	1	–	4	–
	John Molyneux	18	2	15	1	1	1	2	–
	Bernard Morrey	20	6	17	5	–	–	3	1
	Sam Morris	12	1	11	–	–	–	1	1
	Billy Pye	5	2	5	2	–	–	–	–
	Jimmy Rolfe	20	4	17	3	–	–	3	1
(England)	Harry Smith	11	2	10	1	–	–	1	1
(England)	Fred Sutcliffe	32	–	28	–	–	–	4	–
	Johnny Thomas	32	5	29	5	1	–	2	–
	Don Travis	48	16	43	12	1	–	4	4
	Phil Whitlock	24	–	23	–	1	–	–	–
(England)	Bobby Williams	3	–	3	–	–	–	–	–
	Billy Windle	39	7	35	6	1	1	3	–
	Own goals	–	–	–	–	–	–	–	–
	Total	52	61	46	48	1	2	5	11
