= Bernard Hackett (footballer) =

English footballer

Personal information
- Full name: Bernard Edward Keith Hackett
- Date of birth: 7 September 1933
- Place of birth: Ramsbottom, Lancashire, England
- Date of death: 21 May 2022 (aged 88)
- Position: Forward

Youth career
- Birmingham City
- Aston Villa

Senior career*
Years	Team	Apps	(Gls)
1953–1955	Aston Villa	0	(0)
1955–1957	Chester	21	(4)
1957	Altrincham		
1957–1958	Witton Albion		
1958	Macclesfield Town	4	(0)
1958–1959	Lockheed Leamington		
1959–1960	Halesowen Town		
1960	Cradley Town		
- * Club domestic league appearances and goals

Bernard Hackett (7 September 1933 - 21 May 2022) was an English professional footballer, builder and Black Country poet. He played in The Football League for Chester in the 1950s.

== Playing career ==
Although born in Ramsbottom, Hackett grew up in the West Midlands. As a youngster he represented Worcestershire at county level and Birmingham City's junior side before joining Aston Villa. He turned professional in 1953 but left two years later without making a league appearance.

Hackett was one of several forwards to sign for Chester in the summer of 1955, as manager Louis Page also purchased Charlie Jolley, George Allman, Jack Haines, Jim Collins and Frank Wayman. The competition for places and a knee injury meant Hackett was not a regular in the side and he was released in the summer of 1957.

After leaving Chester, Hackett dropped into non-league football and played for Altrincham, Witton Albion, Macclesfield Town, Lockheed Leamington, Halesowen Town and Cradley Town while working in the building trade.
