= Jack Hillier =

Jack Hillier may refer to

- Jack Hillier (art historian) (1912–1995)
- Jack Hillier (footballer)
