= Kenneth Fletcher =

Ken or Kenneth Fletcher may refer to:

- Ken Fletcher (1940–2006), Australian tennis player
- Ken Fletcher (Australian footballer) (born 1948), Australian rules football player (Essendon)
- Ken Fletcher (footballer, born 1931) (1931–2011), English football player (Chester City)
