= 2007–08 in English football =

Football in England
- Season: 2007–08

Men's football
- Premier League: Manchester United
- Championship: West Bromwich Albion
- League One: Swansea City
- League Two: Milton Keynes Dons
- Conference National: Aldershot Town
- FA Cup: Portsmouth
- League Cup: Tottenham Hotspur
- Community Shield: Manchester United

Women's football
- Premier League National Division: Arsenal
- Premier League Northern Division: Nottingham Forest
- Premier League Southern Division: Fulham
- FA Women's Cup: Arsenal
- Premier League Cup: Everton

The 2007–08 season was the 128th season of competitive football in England.

== Club football ==
=== European competitions ===
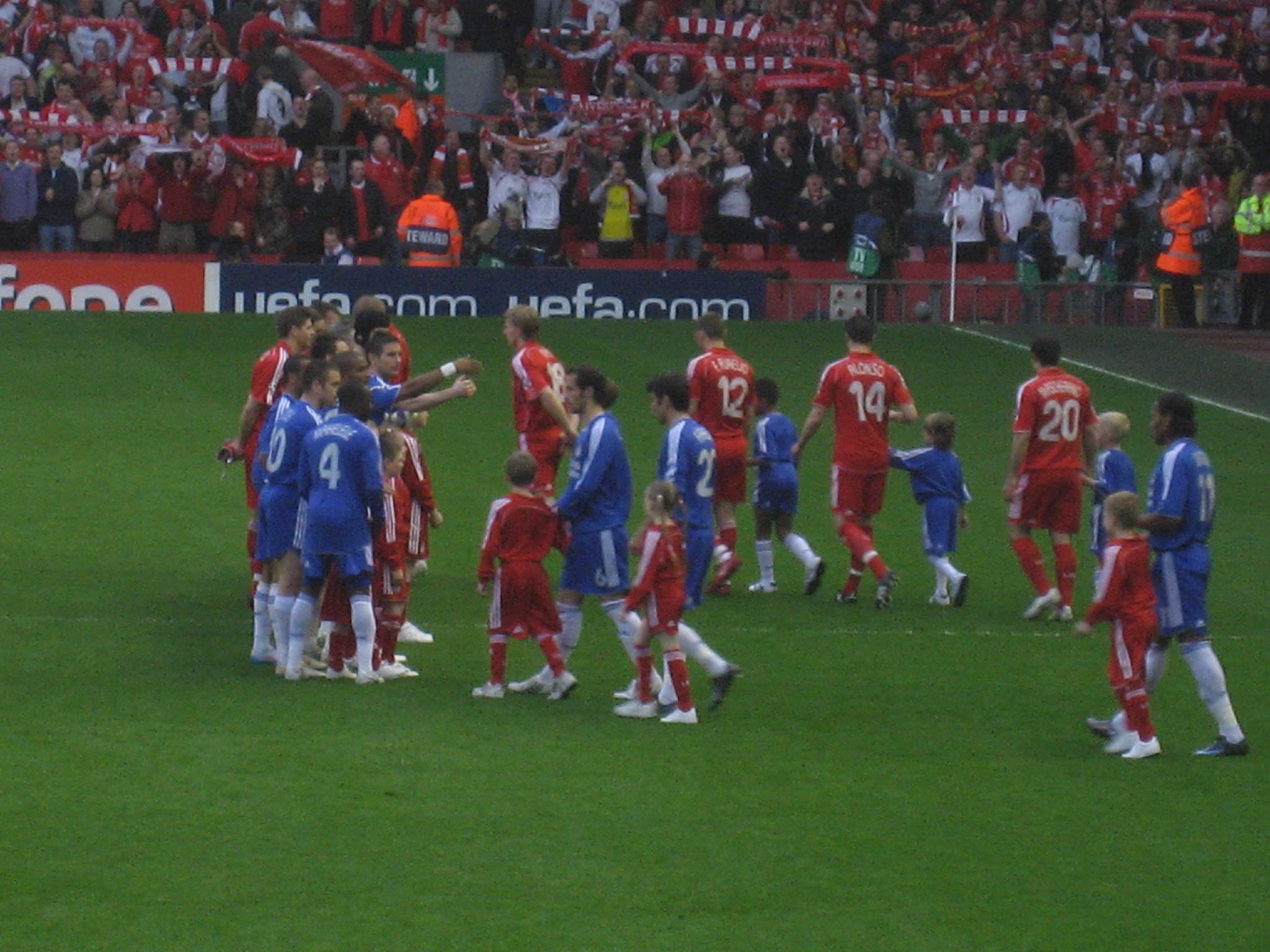
Chelsea and Liverpool faced each other in the UEFA Champions League for the fourth season in succession.

In October 2007, Arsenal equalled the UEFA Champions League record victory with a 7–0 win over Slavia Prague at the Emirates Stadium. The record was broken the following month when Liverpool defeated Beşiktaş 8–0 at Anfield. All four English clubs competing in the Champions League reached the quarter-finals, resulting in three all-English ties during the competition's latter stages. Liverpool eliminated Arsenal in the quarter-finals, but lost the semi-final to Chelsea, who went on to meet Manchester United in the final in Moscow. United completed the European Double, winning the Premier League two points ahead of Chelsea and winning the UEFA Champions League, again against Chelsea 6–5 on penalties (1–1 after extra time) to lift the European Cup for the third time. This was a unique occurrence – the first time two English clubs had met in the final of the European Cup/Champions League. It was also a repeat of the opening game of the season, the FA Community Shield, which also finished in a 1–1 draw and saw a United win 3–0 on penalties.

In the UEFA Cup, none of the English teams taking part reached the quarter-final stage. Blackburn Rovers, who had qualified for the competition via the Intertoto Cup, were beaten in the first round by AEL. The three other English clubs progressed through the group stages, with Bolton Wanderers losing to Sporting CP, while Tottenham Hotspur and Everton were both eliminated on penalty shootouts in the round of 16, by PSV Eindhoven and Fiorentina respectively. The 2008 UEFA Cup final was held at the City of Manchester Stadium, the first time that the UEFA Cup Final had been held in England since being reduced to a single match. The event was marred by riots in Manchester city centre prior to the game. In the match itself, Zenit Saint Petersburg beat Rangers 2–0 to lift the trophy.

=== Premier League ===
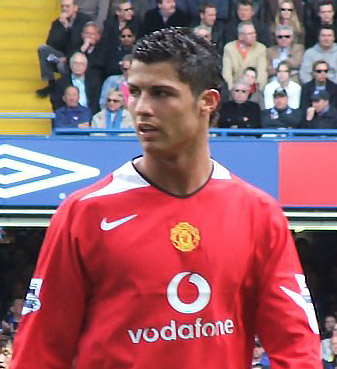
Cristiano Ronaldo was the Premier League's top scorer and won numerous awards.

Manchester United retained the Premier League title, winning the competition for the tenth time and becoming champions of England for the seventeenth time. The title was decided on the final day of the season as United's 2–0 win at Wigan Athletic saw them crowned champions and consigned Chelsea to the runners-up spot regardless of their result at home to Bolton Wanderers. Arsenal and Liverpool qualified for the UEFA Champions League 2008–09 third qualifying round by finishing third and fourth respectively, while Everton's fifth position gave them a place in the 2008–09 UEFA Cup first round. Reading, Birmingham City and Derby County were relegated. Derby became the first team in Premier League history to be relegated before the end of March. They eventually finished on the lowest Premier League points tally ever, amassing only eleven points and winning just one game all season.

The Premier League underwent a major rebranding; changing its sponsored name from the Barclays Premiership to the Barclays Premier League, introducing a revamped logo and new typeface for players' jerseys.

=== Football League ===
==== Championship ====
After the disappointment of a play-off final defeat the previous year, West Bromwich Albion won the Football League Championship title and returned to the Premier League. Stoke City secured the other automatic promotion spot, ending a 23-year absence from the top flight. Hull City followed them by winning the play-off final, beating Bristol City 1–0 at Wembley Stadium in the final to reach the top division of English football for the first time in their 104-year history. It was the first time that Hull had played at either the original or rebuilt Wembley Stadium. Despite impressing on their Championship debut in 2006–07, Colchester United finished bottom this season and were relegated back to League One. Scunthorpe United's first journey into the Championship since the 1960s proved short-lived, and they also went back down. The biggest story however was Leicester City's relegation, as a lack of stability at the club (with no fewer than eight men, including caretakers, occupying the manager's seat over the season) proved their undoing and sent them down to the third tier for the first time in their history.

==== League One ====
In a season mired by controversy and points deductions at both ends of the table, Swansea City were the clear champions in League One. In terms of results, Leeds United were actually the best team behind Swansea, but had started the season on –15 points following their failure to reach an agreement with HM Revenue & Customs on their Creditors Voluntary Arrangement. This was the first time in the league's history that such a penalty had been imposed. Nottingham Forest therefore took the second automatic promotion spot on the final day of the season after a late surge of form, culminating in Forest defeating Yeovil 3–2 (Who ironically defeated them in the play-off semi-final the previous season). Doncaster Rovers won promotion to the Championship by beating Leeds 1–0 at Wembley Stadium in the League One play-off final, thus returning to the top two tiers for the first time since 1958. At the opposite end of the table, Port Vale were in fact the worst team going by results, but Luton Town went into administration and were deducted ten points causing them to finish bottom, though they would have been relegated even without this penalty. Bournemouth also received a ten-point deduction for going into administration, and in their case it did prove fatal, sending the club down to League Two. If the points deduction did not occur, then Crewe would have gone down. Gillingham were the other team to suffer relegation.

==== League Two ====
Milton Keynes Dons won their first honours as a club, winning the League Two title and the Football League Trophy. The other clubs automatically promoted were runners-up Peterborough United, who had pushed the Dons close for most of the season, and Hereford United, who returned to the third level of English football for the first time in thirty years. Stockport County won promotion to League One by beating Rochdale 3–2 at Wembley Stadium in the League Two play-off final. There was to be no repeat of Wrexham's last day heroics of the 2006–07 season, and this time they finished bottom and went out of the League. Despite a good run late in the season, Mansfield Town joined them. Both Dagenham & Redbridge and Morecambe played in the Football League for the first time, after securing promotion to League Two from the Conference.

=== Cup competitions and Community Shield ===
Portsmouth won the FA Cup with a 1–0 victory over Cardiff City. Tottenham Hotspur won the League Cup, beating the holders Chelsea 2–1 after extra time. It was the first League Cup final to be played at the new Wembley Stadium. MK Dons won the Football League Trophy after beating Grimsby Town 2–0 in the final. Manchester United took the first silverware of the season when they beat Chelsea 3–0 on penalties in the FA Community Shield.

=== Non-League football ===
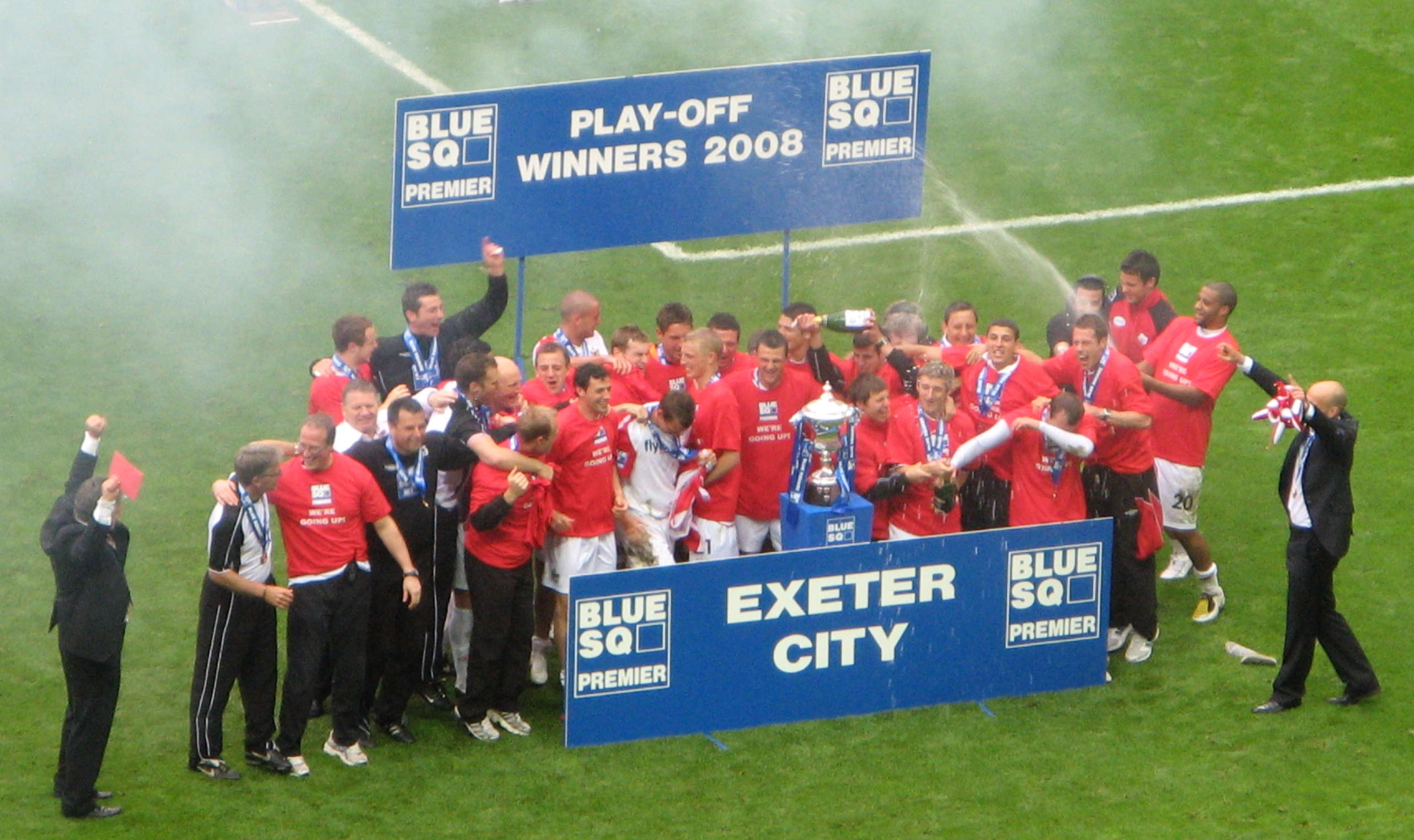
Exeter City celebrate their 2008 Conference National play-off final win.

The Conference National became known as the Blue Square Premier upon the announcement of a three-year sponsorship deal. The two regional feeder leagues became known as the Blue Square North and South respectively. The deal signalled the end of a nine-year association between the Conference and the Nationwide Building Society. Aldershot Town won the Conference National to gain automatic promotion to the Football League, while Exeter City beat Cambridge United 1–0 in the play-off final at Wembley Stadium to secure the other promotion place. Aldershot also won the Conference League Cup, beating Rushden & Diamonds in a penalty shootout after a 3–3 draw. The FA Trophy was won by Ebbsfleet United, who beat Torquay United 1–0 at Wembley.

== Events off the field ==
Deloitte reported in September 2007 that transfer spending by all Premier League and Football League clubs had exceeded £500 million, compared to £300 million spent the season before. Deloitte attributed the rise in spending to the huge increase in broadcasting revenue and new owners buying into Premier League clubs.

Two league clubs moved to new grounds for 2007–08. Shrewsbury Town moved to the New Meadow for the start of this season, after leaving their old stadium, Gay Meadow. Milton Keynes Dons moved to their new 22,000 all seater stadium at Denbigh, Milton Keynes, known as Stadium:mk. The stadium was officially opened on 29 November 2007 by Queen Elizabeth.

Sheffield, the world's oldest football club, celebrated their 150th anniversary; events included a friendly match against Inter Milan.

=== Clubs removed ===
- Halifax Town (Conference National)

== Managerial changes ==
Name	Club	Date of departure	Replacement	Date of appointment
Neil McDonald	Carlisle United	13 August 2007	John Ward	2 October 2007
Martin Allen	Leicester City	29 August 2007	Gary Megson	13 September 2007
Ronnie Jepson	Gillingham	9 September 2007	Mark Stimson	1 November 2007
José Mourinho	Chelsea	20 September 2007	Avram Grant	20 September 2007
Martin Foyle	Port Vale	26 September 2007	Lee Sinnott	5 November 2007
John Gregory	Queens Park Rangers	1 October 2007	Luigi De Canio	29 October 2007
John Ward	Cheltenham Town	2 October 2007	Keith Downing^{1}	2 November 2007
Willie Donachie	Millwall	8 October 2007	Kenny Jackett	6 November 2007
Peter Taylor	Crystal Palace	8 October 2007	Neil Warnock	11 October 2007
Peter Grant	Norwich City	9 October 2007	Glenn Roeder	30 October 2007
John Schofield	Lincoln City	15 October 2007	Peter Jackson	30 October 2007
Steve Thompson	Notts County	16 October 2007	Ian McParland	18 October 2007
Sammy Lee	Bolton Wanderers	17 October 2007	Gary Megson	25 October 2007
Gary Megson	Leicester City	24 October 2007	Ian Holloway	22 November 2007
Martin Jol	Tottenham Hotspur	25 October 2007	Juande Ramos	27 October 2007
Chris Hutchings	Wigan Athletic	5 November 2007	Steve Bruce	26 November 2007
Steve Cotterill	Burnley	8 November 2007	Owen Coyle	22 November 2007
Paul Simpson	Preston North End	13 November 2007	Alan Irvine	20 November 2007
Brian Carey	Wrexham	15 November 2007	Brian Little	15 November 2007
Steve Bruce	Birmingham City	19 November 2007	Alex McLeish	28 November 2007
Ian Holloway	Plymouth Argyle	21 November 2007	Paul Sturrock	27 November 2007
Billy Davies	Derby County	26 November 2007	Paul Jewell	28 November 2007
Paul Sturrock	Swindon Town	27 November 2007	Maurice Malpas	15 January 2008
Terry Butcher	Brentford	11 December 2007	Andy Scott^{2}	4 January 2008
Lawrie Sanchez	Fulham	21 December 2007	Roy Hodgson	30 December 2007
Sam Allardyce	Newcastle United	9 January 2008	Kevin Keegan	16 January 2008
Chris Casper	Bury	14 January 2008	Alan Knill	4 February 2008
Kevin Blackwell	Luton Town	16 January 2008	Mick Harford^{3}	16 January 2008
George Burley	Southampton	24 January 2008	Nigel Pearson	18 February 2008
Dennis Wise	Leeds United	29 January 2008	Gary McAllister	29 January 2008
Iain Dowie	Coventry City	11 February 2008	Chris Coleman	19 February 2008
Bryan Robson	Sheffield United	14 February 2008	Kevin Blackwell^{4}	14 February 2008
Ian Brightwell	Macclesfield Town	27 February 2008	Keith Alexander	27 February 2008
Bobby Williamson	Chester City	2 March 2008	Simon Davies^{5}	11 March 2008
Gary Peters	Shrewsbury Town	3 March 2008	Paul Simpson	12 March 2008
Billy Dearden	Mansfield Town	8 March 2008	Paul Holland^{6}	25 March 2008
Andy Ritchie	Huddersfield Town	1 April 2008	Stan Ternent	24 April 2008
Richard Money	Walsall	22 April 2008	Jimmy Mullen^{7}	22 May 2008
Dean Wilkins	Brighton & Hove Albion	8 May 2008	Micky Adams	8 May 2008
Luigi De Canio	Queens Park Rangers	8 May 2008	Iain Dowie	14 May 2008
Paul Lambert	Wycombe Wanderers	20 May 2008	Peter Taylor	29 May 2008
Ian Holloway	Leicester City	23 May 2008	Nigel Pearson	20 June 2008
Avram Grant	Chelsea	24 May 2008	Luiz Felipe Scolari	1 July 2008
Nigel Pearson	Southampton	30 May 2008	Jan Poortvliet	30 May 2008
Sven-Göran Eriksson	Manchester City	2 June 2008	Mark Hughes	5 June 2008
Mark Hughes	Blackburn Rovers	5 June 2008	Paul Ince	22 June 2008
Paul Ince	Milton Keynes Dons	22 June 2008	Roberto Di Matteo	2 July 2008

=== Notes ===
- ^{1} Downing was previously caretaker manager after Ward's departure.
- ^{2} Scott was previously caretaker manager after Butcher's departure.
- ^{3} Harford was named caretaker manager for the remainder of the season.
- ^{4} Blackwell was named caretaker manager for the remainder of the season.
- ^{5} Davies' caretaker role was extended until the end of the season.
- ^{6} Holland's caretaker role was extended until the end of the season.
- ^{7} Mullen was previously caretaker manager after Money's departure.

== Promotion and relegation ==
Playoff winners in bold.

=== Premier League ===
- Champions: Manchester United
- Champions League 2008–09 Qualifiers : Manchester United, Chelsea, Arsenal and Liverpool
- UEFA Cup 2008–09 Qualifiers : Tottenham Hotspur, Everton, Manchester City and Portsmouth
- Relegated to The Championship : Derby County, Birmingham City and Reading

=== Championship ===
- Champions: West Bromwich Albion
- Promoted: Stoke City
- Playoffs : **Hull City**, Bristol City, Watford and Crystal Palace
- Relegated: Leicester City, Scunthorpe United and Colchester United

=== League One ===
- Champions: Swansea City
- Promoted: Nottingham Forest
- Playoffs : **Doncaster Rovers**, Leeds United, Southend United and Carlisle United
- Relegated: AFC Bournemouth, Gillingham, Port Vale and Luton Town

=== League Two ===
- Champions: Milton Keynes Dons
- Promoted: Peterborough United, Hereford United
- Playoffs : **Stockport County**, Rochdale, Darlington and Wycombe Wanderers
- Relegated: Mansfield Town and Wrexham

=== Conference National ===
- Champions: Aldershot Town
- Play-offs: Cambridge United, Torquay United, **Exeter City** and Burton Albion
- Relegated: Altrincham*, Farsley Celtic, Stafford Rangers and Droylsden
- Promoted to: Kettering Town, Lewes, Eastbourne Borough and Barrow

*Altrincham avoided relegation after Halifax Town went into liquidation

== National team ==
England played their first international match on a synthetic pitch against Russia and lost the game 2–1, leaving qualification for UEFA Euro 2008 out of their hands. On 21 November 2007, they lost 3–2 to Croatia, and consequently failed to qualify for Euro 2008 following Russia's 1–0 win over Andorra. As a result, England manager Steve McClaren was sacked the following day. Fabio Capello was confirmed as the new England manager on 14 December 2007. Capello was unveiled by the FA on 17 December 2007, and took up his new role on 7 January 2008.

=== Friendly matches ===
The home team is listed on the left; the visiting one on the right.

22 August 2007

England	1–2	Germany
Lampard 9'; J. Cole (yellow card) 34'	(Report)	Kurányi 26'; Pander 40'

Wembley Stadium, London
Attendance: 86,133
Referee: (Switzerland) Massimo Busacca

16 November 2007

Austria	0–1	England
	(Report)	Crouch 44'

Ernst Happel Stadion, Vienna
Attendance: 39,432
Referee: (Denmark) Nicolai Vollquartz

6 February 2008

England	2–1	Switzerland
Jenas 40'; Wright-Phillips 62'	(Report)	Derdiyok 58'

Wembley Stadium, London
Attendance: 86,857
Referee: (Germany) Felix Brych

26 March 2008

France	1–0	England
Ribéry 32' (pen.)	(Report)

Stade de France, Paris
Attendance: 78,500
Referee: (Germany) Florian Meyer

28 May 2008

England	2–0	United States
Terry 38'; Gerrard 59'	(Report)

Wembley Stadium, London
Attendance: 71,233
Referee: (Greece) Kyros Vassaras

1 June 2008

Trinidad and Tobago	0–3	England
	(Report)	Barry 12'; Defoe 16', 49'; Gerrard (yellow card) 30'

Hasely Crawford Stadium, Port of Spain
Attendance: 25,001
Referee: (Suriname) Enrico Wijngaarde

=== Euro 2008 qualifiers ===
8 September 2007

England	3 – 0	Israel
Wright-Phillips 20'; Owen 49'; Richards 66'; Terry (yellow card) 67'	(Report)	Gershon (yellow card) 15'; Benado (yellow card) 45'; Ziv (yellow card) 55'; Aouate (yellow card) 66'

Wembley Stadium, London
Attendance: 85,372
Referee: (Netherlands) Pieter Vink

12 September 2007

England	3–0	Russia
Owen 7', 31'; J. Cole (yellow card) 79'; Ferdinand 84'	(Report)

Wembley Stadium, London
Attendance: 86,106
Referee: (Sweden) Martin Hansson

13 October 2007

England	3–0	Estonia
Wright-Phillips 11'; Rooney 32'; Rähn 33' (o.g.)	(Report)	Rähn (yellow card) 12'; Lindpere (yellow card) 73'

Wembley Stadium, London
Attendance: 86,655
Referee: (Denmark) Nicolai Vollquartz

17 October 2007

Russia	2–1	England
V. Berezutski (yellow card) 12'; Pavlyuchenko 69' (pen.), 73', (yellow card) 74'	(Report)	Rooney 29'; Ferdinand (yellow card) 59'

Luzhniki Stadium, Moscow
Attendance: 84,700
Referee: (Spain) Luis Medina Cantalejo

21 November 2007

England	2–3	Croatia
Lampard 56' (pen.); Crouch 65'	(Report)	Kranjčar 8'; Olić 14'; Petrić 77'

Wembley Stadium, London
Attendance: 88,091
Referee: (Sweden) Peter Fröjdfeldt

== League tables ==
=== Premier League ===
Manchester United were crowned league champions for the second year in succession, the tenth time in the history of the Premier League and the 17th time overall. They also won the European Cup/UEFA Champions League for the third time, and Cristiano Ronaldo finished as the league's top scorer with 31 goals. While all three of their main rivals kept the battle for the title close, Chelsea had the more dramatic season; influential manager José Mourinho departed in mid-September and was replaced by Avram Grant, who became the first Chelsea manager in four years to go without a trophy. Arsenal, meanwhile, after two seasons of disappointment, finished third, just missing out on the title by four points. Completing the top four was Liverpool, which ensured that the same four teams qualified for Europe's elite competition once again.

Everton and Aston Villa occupied the two qualification places for the UEFA Cup as managers David Moyes and Martin O'Neill continued to impress for their respective sides (Villa qualified for the Intertoto Cup), whilst Portsmouth collected their first piece of silverware in 58 years by winning the FA Cup in their most successful season ever. Tottenham shook off the shock sacking of Martin Jol with newly installed Juande Ramos winning them their first trophy in nine years in the League Cup and ensuring a third consecutive year of UEFA Cup qualification, even if their league form was far from stellar.

Manchester City went into the season with high expectations, with a new owner in Thaksin Shinawatra and a new manager in Sven-Göran Eriksson, alongside an influx of new talent, but finished 9th after suffering from inconsistent form at the turn of the year. Eriksson then lost his job at the end of the season, which included an 8–1 loss to Middlesbrough on the final day. Newcastle welcomed the returning Kevin Keegan as manager after sacking Sam Allardyce, and while a winless run from Boxing Day left them four points off the relegation places in mid-March, the Magpies secured safety by winning four of their next seven games.

Newly promoted Derby County, twice champions of the old First Division, were relegated straight back to the Championship after just one season in the Premier League, winning just one game and collecting a mere eleven points all season; the team's season broke records for all the wrong reasons as they had the worst goal difference, the lowest number of goals scored in the top flight and the earliest post-war relegation. Their relegation was effectively confirmed when manager Billy Davies stood down in November. The departure of long-serving manager Steve Bruce and subsequent appointment of Alex McLeish meant that Birmingham were relegated after a single season back in the top flight. Taking the final relegation spot were Reading, who seemed safe until the last few weeks of the season, and only a year after narrowly missing out on a European spot. Fulham narrowly survived on goal difference, seemingly dead and buried until the final few games, the appointment of Roy Hodgson, who returned to English football after nine years managing in Europe, saw significant improvement enabling them to escape the drop.

Pos	Team	Pld	W	D	L	GF	GA	GD	Pts	Qualification or relegation
1	Manchester United (C)	38	27	6	5	80	22	+58	87	Qualification for the Champions League group stage
2	Chelsea	38	25	10	3	65	26	+39	85	Qualification for the Champions League group stage
3	Arsenal	38	24	11	3	74	31	+43	83	Qualification for the Champions League third qualifying round
4	Liverpool	38	21	13	4	67	28	+39	76	Qualification for the Champions League third qualifying round
5	Everton	38	19	8	11	55	33	+22	65	Qualification for the UEFA Cup first round
6	Aston Villa	38	16	12	10	71	51	+20	60	Qualification for the Intertoto Cup third round
7	Blackburn Rovers	38	15	13	10	50	48	+2	58	
8	Portsmouth	38	16	9	13	48	40	+8	57	Qualification for the UEFA Cup first round (Note: As FA Cup winners)
9	Manchester City	38	15	10	13	45	53	−8	55	Qualification for the UEFA Cup first qualifying round (Note: Manchester City qualified as the highest-ranked team not already qualified for European competitions of Premier League Fair Play Ranking by The Football Association, the top association among UEFA Fair Play ranking winners.)
10	West Ham United	38	13	10	15	42	50	−8	49	
11	Tottenham Hotspur	38	11	13	14	66	61	+5	46	Qualification for the UEFA Cup first round (Note: As League Cup winners)
12	Newcastle United	38	11	10	17	45	65	−20	43	
13	Middlesbrough	38	10	12	16	43	53	−10	42	
14	Wigan Athletic	38	10	10	18	34	51	−17	40	
15	Sunderland	38	11	6	21	36	59	−23	39	
16	Bolton Wanderers	38	9	10	19	36	54	−18	37	
17	Fulham	38	8	12	18	38	60	−22	36	
18	Reading (R)	38	10	6	22	41	66	−25	36	Relegation to Football League Championship
19	Birmingham City (R)	38	8	11	19	46	62	−16	35	Relegation to Football League Championship
20	Derby County (R)	38	1	8	29	20	89	−69	11	Relegation to Football League Championship

Source: Barclays Premier League
Rules for classification: 1) points; 2) goal difference; 3) number of goals scored.
For further information on European qualification see Premier League – Competition
(C) Champions; (R) Relegated
Notes:

Leading goalscorer: Cristiano Ronaldo (Manchester United) – 31

=== Football League Championship ===
West Bromwich Albion won the Championship title and sealed promotion to the Premier League after a two-year absence. Stoke City joined them, clinching promotion on the last day of the season and returning to the top flight of English football after an absence of 23 years. Hull City reached the top flight for the first time in their history after beating Bristol City 1–0 in the playoff final, marking their third promotion in five seasons having battled relegation last season. Bristol City had actually led the table at several points of the season but nonetheless their fourth-place finish proved a far cry from being the relegation favourites many had tipped them for.

Wolverhampton Wanderers narrowly missed out on the play-offs on goal difference to a Watford side who actually led the league for most of the first half of the campaign but won just one of their last sixteen to sneak into the playoffs, with not even the arrival of top scorer Sylvan Ebanks-Blake helping Wolves' cause. Ipswich Town lost just once at home but missed out despite a final day win over Hull. Crystal Palace initially looked in danger of relegation until the appointment of Neil Warnock in October saw them climb the table and clinch a play-off spot at the expense of his old club Sheffield United.

Colchester United could not build on last season's tenth-place finish and were relegated back to League One in bottom place after two years in this league. Scunthorpe United's return to the second tier was short lived as they made an immediate return to League One. Leicester City went down on the final day despite drawing at Stoke, after Southampton beat Sheffield United to move above them. It meant that the Foxes would spend next season playing in the third tier of English football for the first time in their history, the employment of four permanent managers throughout the season saw them finally hit rock-bottom after several years of struggle and managerial changes. Sheffield Wednesday, Coventry City and Blackpool also all survived on the last day, in Coventry's case despite losing 4–1 at Charlton.

Pos	Team	Pld	W	D	L	GF	GA	GD	Pts	Promotion, qualification or relegation
1	West Bromwich Albion (C, P)	46	23	12	11	88	55	+33	81	Promotion to the Premier League
2	Stoke City (P)	46	21	16	9	69	55	+14	79	Promotion to the Premier League
3	Hull City (O, P)	46	21	12	13	65	47	+18	75	Qualification for Championship play-offs
4	Bristol City	46	20	14	12	54	53	+1	74	Qualification for Championship play-offs
5	Crystal Palace	46	18	17	11	58	42	+16	71	Qualification for Championship play-offs
6	Watford	46	18	16	12	62	56	+6	70	Qualification for Championship play-offs
7	Wolverhampton Wanderers	46	18	16	12	53	48	+5	70	
8	Ipswich Town	46	18	15	13	65	56	+9	69	
9	Sheffield United	46	17	15	14	56	51	+5	66	
10	Plymouth Argyle	46	17	13	16	60	50	+10	64	
11	Charlton Athletic	46	17	13	16	63	58	+5	64	
12	Cardiff City	46	16	16	14	59	55	+4	64	
13	Burnley	46	16	14	16	60	67	−7	62	
14	Queens Park Rangers	46	14	16	16	60	66	−6	58	
15	Preston North End	46	15	11	20	50	56	−6	56	
16	Sheffield Wednesday	46	14	13	19	54	55	−1	55	
17	Norwich City	46	15	10	21	49	59	−10	55	
18	Barnsley	46	14	13	19	52	65	−13	55	
19	Blackpool	46	12	18	16	59	64	−5	54	
20	Southampton	46	13	15	18	56	72	−16	54	
21	Coventry City	46	14	11	21	52	64	−12	53	
22	Leicester City (R)	46	12	16	18	42	45	−3	52	Relegation to Football League One
23	Scunthorpe United (R)	46	11	13	22	46	69	−23	46	Relegation to Football League One
24	Colchester United (R)	46	7	17	22	62	86	−24	38	Relegation to Football League One

Updated to match(es) played on 4 May 2008. Source: The Football League
Rules for classification: 1) points; 2) goal difference; 3) number of goals scored.
(C) Champions; (O) Play-off winners; (P) Promoted; (R) Relegated

Leading goalscorer: Sylvan Ebanks-Blake (Wolverhampton Wanderers) – 23

=== Football League One ===
Swansea City won the League One title after amassing 92 points, the highest by a Welsh club in the Football League. Nottingham Forest moved back up to the Championship after a three-season absence, winning six of their last seven and snatching promotion from Doncaster Rovers on the final day. Doncaster made amends for missing out on automatic promotion by winning the playoffs to enter the Championship after a half century absence from the second tier.

Leeds United's record would have seen them promoted at the expense of Forest, but they were cost dear by a 15-point deduction that was imposed pre-season after their failure to agree a deal with their creditors almost resulted in the club being ejected from the Football League entirely. The deduction led to many experts predicting they would suffer a second successive relegation, but those fears were quickly dismissed, as they wiped the deduction out by winning their first five games, and ultimately started the campaign with a 13-match unbeaten run. However, they lost to Doncaster in the playoff final, ending their hopes of an immediate return to the Championship. Carlisle proved to be the surprise package however and remained in contention for 2nd place until the final day, narrowly losing to Leeds in the play-offs.

Luton Town suffered their second consecutive relegation as they finished bottom and sat in administration for the entire season, resulting in a ten-point deduction. Port Vale, who were statistically the worst team in the division, joined them. Gillingham were relegated on the last day of the season, as were Bournemouth, the latter of whom also entered administration and suffered a ten-point deduction which proved fatal. Crewe narrowly escaped relegation courtesy of Bournemouth's points deduction and despite losing 4–1 on the final day. Cheltenham avoided the drop in part to their final day win that also cost Doncaster automatic promotion.

Pos	Team	Pld	W	D	L	GF	GA	GD	Pts	Promotion, qualification or relegation
1	Swansea City (C, P)	46	27	11	8	82	42	+40	92	Promotion to Football League Championship
2	Nottingham Forest (P)	46	22	16	8	64	32	+32	82	Promotion to Football League Championship
3	Doncaster Rovers (O, P)	46	23	11	12	65	41	+24	80	Qualification for League One play-offs
4	Carlisle United	46	23	11	12	64	46	+18	80	Qualification for League One play-offs
5	Leeds United	46	27	10	9	72	38	+34	76 (Note: Leeds deducted 15 points for failure to comply with rules on insolvency.)	Qualification for League One play-offs
6	Southend United	46	22	10	14	70	55	+15	76	Qualification for League One play-offs
7	Brighton & Hove Albion	46	19	12	15	58	50	+8	69	
8	Oldham Athletic	46	18	13	15	58	46	+12	67	
9	Northampton Town	46	17	15	14	60	55	+5	66	
10	Huddersfield Town	46	20	6	20	50	62	−12	66	
11	Tranmere Rovers	46	18	11	17	52	47	+5	65	
12	Walsall	46	16	16	14	52	46	+6	64	
13	Swindon Town	46	16	13	17	63	56	+7	61	
14	Leyton Orient	46	16	12	18	49	63	−14	60	
15	Hartlepool United	46	15	9	22	63	66	−3	54	
16	Bristol Rovers	46	12	17	17	45	53	−8	53	
17	Millwall	46	14	10	22	45	60	−15	52	
18	Yeovil Town	46	14	10	22	38	59	−21	52	
19	Cheltenham Town	46	13	12	21	42	64	−22	51	
20	Crewe Alexandra	46	12	14	20	47	65	−18	50	
21	AFC Bournemouth (R)	46	17	7	22	62	72	−10	48 (Note: Bournemouth deducted 10 points for entering administration.)	Relegation to Football League Two
22	Gillingham (R)	46	11	13	22	44	73	−29	46	Relegation to Football League Two
23	Port Vale (R)	46	9	11	26	47	81	−34	38	Relegation to Football League Two
24	Luton Town (R)	46	11	10	25	43	63	−20	33 (Note: Luton deducted 10 points each for entering administration.)	Relegation to Football League Two

Updated to match(es) played on unknown. Source: The Football League
Rules for classification: 1) points; 2) goal difference; 3) number of goals scored.
(C) Champions; (O) Play-off winners; (P) Promoted; (R) Relegated
Notes:

Leading goalscorer: Jason Scotland (Swansea City) – 24

=== Football League Two ===
MK Dons won the League Two title, returning to the third tier after a two-season absence and earning their first major achievement in their four-year history. New boss Darren Ferguson led Peterborough United to promotion as runners-up. Hereford United also climbed out of the bottom division meaning they would be playing third-tier football for first time in thirty years next season. The final promotion place went to Stockport County, who won the playoffs.

At the bottom, Wrexham lost their 87-year League status. Mansfield Town had a good FA Cup run but could not cope in the league and were also relegated out of the league after 77 years.

Entering the Football League for the following season were Aldershot Town (the successor of the original Aldershot that folded during the 1991–92 season) and Exeter City, who returned after five years away.

Pos	Team	Pld	W	D	L	GF	GA	GD	Pts	Promotion or relegation
1	Milton Keynes Dons (C, P)	46	29	10	7	82	37	+45	97	Promotion to 2008–09 League One
2	Peterborough United (P)	46	28	8	10	84	43	+41	92	Promotion to 2008–09 League One
3	Hereford United (P)	46	26	10	10	72	41	+31	88	Promotion to 2008–09 League One
4	Stockport County (O, P)	46	24	10	12	72	54	+18	82	Qualification for League Two playoffs
5	Rochdale	46	23	11	12	77	54	+23	80	Qualification for League Two playoffs
6	Darlington	46	22	12	12	67	40	+27	78	Qualification for League Two playoffs
7	Wycombe Wanderers	46	22	12	12	56	42	+14	78	Qualification for League Two playoffs
8	Chesterfield	46	19	12	15	76	56	+20	69	
9	Rotherham United	46	21	11	14	62	58	+4	64 (Note: Rotherham United deducted 10 points for administration entrance.)	
10	Bradford City	46	17	11	18	63	61	+2	62	
11	Morecambe	46	16	12	18	59	63	−4	60	
12	Barnet	46	16	12	18	56	63	−7	60	
13	Bury	46	16	11	19	58	61	−3	59	
14	Brentford	46	17	8	21	52	70	−18	59	
15	Lincoln City	46	18	4	24	61	77	−16	58	
16	Grimsby Town	46	15	10	21	55	66	−11	55	
17	Accrington Stanley	46	16	3	27	49	83	−34	51	
18	Shrewsbury Town	46	12	14	20	56	65	−9	50	
19	Macclesfield Town	46	11	17	18	47	64	−17	50	
20	Dagenham & Redbridge	46	13	10	23	49	70	−21	49	
21	Notts County	46	10	18	18	37	53	−16	48	
22	Chester City	46	12	11	23	51	68	−17	47	
23	Mansfield Town (R)	46	11	9	26	48	68	−20	42	Relegation to 2008–09 Conference National
24	Wrexham (R)	46	10	10	26	38	70	−32	40	Relegation to 2008–09 Conference National

Updated to match(es) played on 3 May 2008. Source: The Football League
Rules for classification: 1) points; 2) goal difference; 3) number of goals scored.
(C) Champions; (O) Play-off winners; (P) Promoted; (R) Relegated
Notes:

Leading goalscorer: Aaron McLean (Peterborough United) – 29

== Women's football ==
=== Women's Premier League ===
==== National Division ====
Pos	Team	Pld	W	D	L	GF	GA	GD	Pts	Qualification or relegation
1	Arsenal (C)	22	20	2	0	85	15	+70	62	Qualification for the UEFA Cup qualifying round
2	Everton	22	18	3	1	69	14	+55	57	
3	Leeds United (Note: On 9 July 2008, the team announced they were changing their name to Leeds Carnegie Ladies F.C. This came to ensure all of the professional sports teams Leeds Met University were investing in carried the name of the university's sport department, Carnegie College (including Leeds Carnegie and Yorkshire Carnegie). On 8 July 2010 it was announced by Leeds United F.C. that to stop Leeds Carnegie Ladies from going out of existence the club would step in to provide funding again, bringing the club full circle back to Leeds United Ladies once more, a day under two years since the club was renamed Leeds Carnegie L.F.C.)	22	12	4	6	45	33	+12	40	
4	Bristol Academy	22	10	4	8	45	35	+10	34	
5	Chelsea	22	9	5	8	40	35	+5	32	
6	Doncaster Rovers Belles	22	8	5	9	44	42	+2	29	
7	Watford	22	9	2	11	53	52	+1	29	
8	Blackburn Rovers	22	8	4	10	50	45	+5	28	
9	Birmingham City	22	7	4	11	34	39	−5	25	
10	Liverpool	22	6	4	12	31	51	−20	22	
11	Cardiff City (R)	22	3	3	16	19	69	−50	12	Relegation to the Southern Division; Qualification for the UEFA Cup qualifying round (Note: Qualified by winning the Welsh Women's Cup.)
12	Charlton Athletic (R)	22	0	4	18	6	91	−85	4	Relegation to the Southern Division

Source: FA WPL
(C) Champions; (R) Relegated

==== Northern Division ====
Pos	Team	Pld	W	D	L	GF	GA	GD	Pts	Promotion or relegation
1	Nottingham Forest (C, P)	22	18	4	0	80	26	+54	58	Promotion to the National Division
2	Lincoln City	22	18	1	3	66	16	+50	55	
3	Sunderland	22	16	2	4	52	30	+22	50	
4	Newcastle United	22	10	3	9	58	46	+12	33	
5	Preston North End	22	10	1	11	39	39	0	31	
6	Sheffield Wednesday	22	8	2	12	38	48	−10	26	
7	Manchester City	22	7	4	11	29	41	−12	25	
8	Tranmere Rovers	22	7	3	12	36	57	−21	24	
9	Rotherham United	22	7	1	14	41	62	−21	22	
10	Aston Villa	22	6	3	13	49	59	−10	21	
11	Stockport County (R)	22	6	1	15	21	54	−33	19	Relegation to the Northern Combination League
12	Crewe Alexandra (R)	22	5	3	14	30	61	−31	18	Relegation to the Midland Combination League

Source: FA WPL
Rules for classification: 1) Points; 2) Goal difference; 3) Number of goals scored
(C) Champions; (P) Promoted; (R) Relegated

==== Southern Division ====
Pos	Team	Pld	W	D	L	GF	GA	GD	Pts	Promotion or relegation
1	Fulham (C, P)	22	15	5	2	70	19	+51	50	Promoted to National Division
2	Millwall Lionesses	22	13	5	4	50	21	+29	44	
3	Barnet	22	13	4	5	61	21	+40	43	
4	Portsmouth	22	13	3	6	63	26	+37	42	
5	West Ham United	22	12	0	10	63	46	+17	36	
6	Crystal Palace	22	10	4	8	45	30	+15	34	
7	Colchester United	22	10	1	11	51	54	−3	31	
8	Keynsham Town	22	8	6	8	51	31	+20	30	
9	Newquay	22	9	2	11	50	45	+5	29	
10	Brighton & Hove Albion	22	6	2	14	35	57	−22	20	
11	Team Bath (R)	22	5	4	13	39	53	−14	19	Relegated to South West Combination League
12	Reading Royals (R)	22	0	0	22	8	183	−175	0	Relegated to South West Combination League

Source: FA WPL
Rules for classification: 1) Points; 2) Goal difference; 3) Number of goals scored
(C) Champions; (P) Promoted; (R) Relegated

=== FA Women's Cup ===
==== Final ====
5 May 2008
13:00 BST

Arsenal	4–1	Leeds United
K. Smith 54', 83'; Ludlow 59'; Sanderson 60'	Report	Clarke 69'

City Ground, Nottingham
Attendance: 24,582
Referee: Saša Ihringová (Shropshire)

== Retirements ==
- 5 July 2007 – Chris Sutton (Aston Villa)
- 26 July 2007 – Matt Piper (ex Sunderland)
- 3 August 2007 – Charlie Oatway (Brighton & Hove Albion)
- 15 August 2007 – Mark Delaney (Aston Villa)
- 28 August 2007 – Ole Gunnar Solskjær (Manchester United)
- 28 August 2007 – David Woozley (Crawley Town)
- 30 August 2007 – Neal Ardley (Millwall)
- 11 September 2007 – James Quinn (Northampton Town)
- 7 December 2007 – Phil Gilchrist (Oxford United)
- 2 January 2008 – Mark Goodlad (Port Vale)
- 16 January 2008 – Juan Ugarte (Wrexham)
- 7 February 2008 – John Hartson (West Bromwich Albion)
- 12 March 2008 – Tore André Flo (Leeds United)
- 25 March 2008 – Claus Lundekvam (Southampton)
- End of season – Dion Dublin (Norwich City)
- End of season – Teddy Sheringham (Colchester United)
- End of season – David Wetherall (Bradford City)
- End of season – Neil Young (AFC Bournemouth)
- End of season – Alan Thompson (Leeds United)

== Deaths ==
- 3 July 2007 – Dave Simmons, 58, former striker who played for Aston Villa, Colchester United, Brentford and Cambridge United. Perhaps best known for scoring the decisive goal in Colchester's upset win against Leeds United in the 1971 FA Cup.
- 20 July 2007 – David Preece, 44, former midfielder, most notably at Luton Town, where he played 11 seasons and won the League Cup in 1988. Began his career at Walsall, and also played for Derby County, Cambridge United and Torquay United.
- 24 July 2007 – Eric Davis, 75, former Plymouth Argyle, Scunthorpe United and Chester City striker.
- 25 July 2007 – Danny Bergara, 65, Uruguayan who was one of the first Football League managers born outside the British Isles, and the first to lead out an English side at Wembley. Managed several clubs in the lower leagues, and most notably won promotion to the old Third Division with Stockport County in 1991.
- 16 August 2007 – Jeroen Boere, 39, Dutch striker who played for West Ham United, Crystal Palace and Southend United in the late 1990s.
- 25 August 2007 – Ray Jones, 18, Queens Park Rangers striker, killed in a car accident.
- 31 August 2007 – Willie Cunningham, 77, former Leicester City defender who played for Northern Ireland in the 1958 FIFA World Cup.
- 6 September 2007 – Byron Stevenson, 50, former Leeds United, Birmingham City and Bristol Rovers defender who also won 15 caps for Wales.
- 7 September 2007 – Norman Deeley, 73, former Wolverhampton Wanderers winger who scored twice in the 1960 FA Cup Final, and won two caps for England. Also played for Leyton Orient.
- 11 September 2007 – Ian Porterfield, 61, former Sunderland midfielder who scored the winning goal in the 1973 FA Cup Final. Later became a successful manager, managing Chelsea, Reading, Sheffield United and various other clubs and national teams. Was managing Armenia at the time of his death.
- 14 September 2007 – Malcolm Musgrove, 74, former West Ham United and Leyton Orient winger. Played more than 300 games for the Hammers, and later manager Torquay United and several teams in the United States. Died from Alzheimer's disease.
- 20 September 2007 – Johnny Gavin, 79, former striker who is Norwich City's all-time top goalscorer. Also played for Tottenham Hotspur, Watford and Crystal Palace, and won seven caps for the Republic of Ireland.
- 27 September 2007 – Bill Perry, 77, former Blackpool winger who scored the winning goal in the 1953 FA Cup Final, and played three times for England despite being born in South Africa.
- 15 October 2007 – Jackie Little, 95, former Ipswich Town winger who spent 15 years at Portman Road and played in the club's first-ever league match in 1938.
- 19 October 2007 – Michael Maidens, 20, Hartlepool United midfielder, killed in a car accident.
- 13 November 2007 – John Doherty, 72, former Busby Babe who played as an inside-forward for Manchester United and later Leicester City in the 1950s.
- 18 November 2007 – Joe Shaw, 79, former Sheffield United defender; the club's all-time record appearance holder with 629 league matches for the Blades.
- 19 November 2007 – Ken Leek, 72, former Welsh international striker, who won the 1963 League Cup with Birmingham City; also played for Northampton Town, Leicester City, Newcastle United and Bradford City.
- 19 November 2007 – Graham Paddon, 57, former Norwich City and West Ham United midfielder; 1975 FA Cup winner.
- 2 December 2007 – Les Shannon, 81, played as a winger for Liverpool and Burnley in the 1950s; later managed Bury, Blackpool and several clubs in Greece, most notably Olympiakos.
- 7 December 2007 – John Hollowbread, 73, former Tottenham Hotspur and Southampton goalkeeper.
- 9 December 2007 – Jim Langley, 78, full-back who spent the bulk of his career at Fulham (1957–1965), where he won three England caps. Also played for Leeds United, Brighton & Hove Albion and Queens Park Rangers.
- 11 December 2007 – Ray Goddard, 58, goalkeeper who played for Leyton Orient, Millwall and Wimbledon between 1967 and 1981. Was a member of three promotion-winning sides during his career.
- 13 December 2007 – Harry Kirtley, 77, former Sunderland, Cardiff City and Gateshead forward.
- 15 December 2007 – Jimmy O'Neill, 76, former Republic of Ireland international goalkeeper who played club football for Everton, Stoke, Darlington and Port Vale.
- 25 December 2007 – Tommy Harmer, 79, inside-forward for Tottenham Hotspur in the 1950s. Later played for Watford and Chelsea before moving into coaching.
- 27 December 2007 – Brian Lambert, 71, former Mansfield Town full-back.
- 29 December 2007 – Phil O'Donnell, 35, Motherwell midfielder who spent four seasons at Sheffield Wednesday in the early 2000s (decade). Won one cap for Scotland during his first spell at Motherwell in the early 1990s, and had scored for Motherwell in the 1991 Scottish Cup final. Collapsed on the pitch during a Scottish league match, and died later that evening.
- 9 January 2008 – Paul Aimson, 64, former striker who spent the majority of his career at York City, scoring more than 100 goals.
- 14 January 2008 – Johnny Steele, 91, former inside-forward who spent more than half a century at Barnsley as player, coach, manager, secretary and director. He is Barnsley's longest-serving manager.
- 18 January 2008 – Wally Fielding, 88, former Everton inside-forward who played more than 400 games for the Toffees. At the time of his death he was believed to be the oldest living former Everton player.
- 21 January 2008 – Billy Elliott, 82, former Sunderland winger who won five England caps. Also played for Bradford Park Avenue and Burnley, and later became manager of Darlington. He also managed Norwegian side Brann and the Libyan national team.
- c. 1 February 2008 – Johnny Edgar, 71, former Barnsley, Gillingham, York City, Hartlepool United and Exeter City striker; scorer of York's fastest-ever hat-trick (three goals in six minutes against Accrington Stanley in 1959).
- 7 February 2008 – Frank Wayman, 76, former winger who played briefly at the professional level with Chester City and Darlington. Died after being struck by a motorcycle.
- 14 February 2008 – Len Boyd, 84, former Plymouth Argyle, Birmingham City and England B wing half. Captained Birmingham to 1954–55 promotion and the 1956 FA Cup Final.
- 17 February 2008 – Brian Harris, 72, versatile former Everton, Cardiff City and Newport County player who played at every position on the pitch except goalkeeper during his career; also managed Newport.
- 26 February 2008 – Jimmy Dugdale, 76, former West Bromwich Albion, Aston Villa and England B defender. Won the FA Cup twice; with WBA in 1954 and with Villa in 1957.
- 2 March 2008 – Carl Hoddle, 40, former Barnet and Leyton Orient midfielder; brother of Glenn Hoddle.
- 5 March 2008 – Derek Dooley, 78, legendary Sheffield Wednesday striker who scored 62 goals in 61 games for the Owls before having his leg amputated in 1953 following a serious injury. He also played for Lincoln City, and later managed Sheffield Wednesday (1971–1973) before joining city rivals Sheffield United where he held a number of jobs, including commercial manager and chairman.
- 8 March 2008 – Les Smith, 80, former Wolverhampton and Aston Villa winger; member of Aston Villa's 1957 FA Cup winning side.
- 24 March 2008 – John Cushley, 65, Scottish defender who spent three seasons at West Ham United in the late 1960s, and also played for Celtic, Dunfermline and Dumbarton north of the border. Worked as a teacher outside football.
- 24 March 2008 – Ray Drinkwater, 76, former Queens Park Rangers goalkeeper.
- 29 April 2008 – Gordon Bradley, 74, former Carlisle United wing-half who later became an American citizen, where he played for a number of teams including the New York Cosmos, and won one cap for the U.S. national team. He also served as head coach of Cosmos and later the Washington Diplomats of the NASL.
- 1 May 2008 – Mark Kendall, 49, former goalkeeper who played for Tottenham Hotspur, Newport County, Wolverhampton Wanderers and Swansea City. Capped by Wales at Under-21 level.
- 6 May 2008 – John Reames, 66, former Lincoln City chairman and manager.
- 15 May 2008 – Tommy Burns, 51, former Scottish international midfielder who served 18 months as Reading manager in the late 1990s. Spent his playing career north of the border, for Celtic and Kilmarnock.
- 19 May 2008 – Nigel Cassidy, 62, former striker who began his professional career at Norwich City, and later played for Scunthorpe, Oxford and Cambridge.
- 20 May 2008 – Lord Tom Burlison, 71, former Hartlepool United wing-half and honorary life president. Also played for Lincoln City and Darlington. After his football career, he became a trade union leader and Labour peer.
- 24 May 2008 – Reg Flewin, 87, former Portsmouth defender, who captained his hometown side to the 1948–49 and 1949–50 league titles, and also won one wartime cap for England.
- 28 May 2008 – John Hulme, 63, former Bolton Wanderers, Reading and Bury defender.
- 12 June 2008 – Derek Tapscott, 75, former Welsh international striker who played for Arsenal, Cardiff City, Newport County, and several non-league clubs.
- 19 June 2008 – Tim Carter, 40, former goalkeeper at Sunderland, Bristol Rovers, Hartlepool United, Millwall and several other clubs. Was Sunderland's goalkeeping coach at the time of his death.
- 22 June 2008 – Ron Stitfall, 82, former Cardiff City defender who played more than 400 games for the Bluebirds. He also won two caps for Wales.
- 23 June 2008 – Mick Hill, 60, former Sheffield United, Ipswich Town and Crystal Palace forward who also played twice for Wales.
