= Charlie Jolley =

Charlie Jolley may refer to:

- Charlie Jolley (footballer, born 1936) (1936–2014), English footballer
- Charlie Jolley (footballer, born 2001), English footballer
