= John Devine (footballer, born 1933) =

English footballer

Personal information
- Full name: John Henry Devine
- Date of birth: 9 July 1933
- Place of birth: Liverpool, England
- Date of death: May 2017 (aged 83)
- Place of death: Denbighshire, Wales
- Position: Winger

Senior career*
Years	Team	Apps	(Gls)
?–1955	Rhyl		
1955–1956	Chester	1	(0)
1956–?	New Brighton		
- * Club domestic league appearances and goals

John Devine (9 July 1933 - May 2017) was an English footballer who played as a winger and made a professional appearance with Chester.

Devine played for Rhyl until joining Chester in 1955, with goalkeeper John Griffiths making the same move. But whereas Griffiths was to make more than 50 league appearances for the club, Devine was to be restricted to a solitary first team outing. It came on 30 March 1956 in a 2–0 home win over Halifax Town, with Devine wearing the number seven shirt in place of regular George Allman.

He later returned to non–league football when he joined New Brighton.

== Bibliography ==
- Sumner, Chas (1997). On the Borderline: The Official History of Chester City F.C. 1885-1997. Yore Publications. ISBN 978-1-874427-52-0.
