= 1954–55 Welsh Cup =

Tournament details
- Country: Wales

Final positions
- Champions: (Wales) Barry Town
- Runners-up: (England) Chester

The 1954–55 FAW Welsh Cup is the 68th season of the annual knockout tournament for competitive football teams in Wales.

== Key ==
League name pointed after clubs name.

- FL D1 - Football League First Division
- FL D3N - Football League Third Division North
- FL D3S - Football League Third Division South
- SFL - Southern Football League
- WLN - Welsh League North

== Fifth round ==
Ten winners from the Fourth round and six new clubs.

Tie no	Home	Score	Away
1	Caernarfon Town (WLN)	1–1	Chester (FL D3N)
replay	Chester (FL D3N)	9–1	Caernarfon Town (WLN)

== Sixth round ==
Tie no	Home	Score	Away
1	Chester (FL D3N)	3–0	Flint Town United (WLN)

== Semifinal ==
Barry Town and Wrexham played at Cardiff, Cardiff City and Chester played at Wrexham.

Tie no	Home	Score	Away
1	Barry Town (SFL)	3–1	Wrexham (FL D3N)
2	Cardiff City (FL D1)	0–2	Chester (FL D3N)

== Final ==
Final were held at Wrexham, replay - at Cardiff.

Tie no	Home	Score	Away
1	Barry Town (SFL)	1–1	Chester (FL D3N)
replay	Barry Town (SFL)	4–3	Chester (FL D3N)
