= Monty Wright =

English footballer

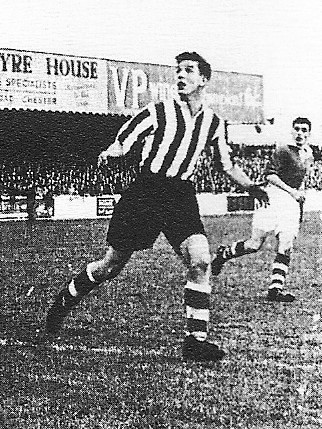
- Monty playing for Chester vs Wrexham in 1954

Personal information
- Full name: Herbert Montague Wright
- Date of birth: 29 May 1931
- Place of birth: Scarcliffe, England
- Date of death: 6 April 2012 (aged 80)
- Place of death: Sutton-in-Ashfield, England
- Position: Wing half

Youth career
- Bolsover Colliery

Senior career*
Years	Team	Apps	(Gls)
1951–1953	Leeds United		
1953–1954	Stockport County	1	(0)
1954–1955	Chester	21	(4)
Total		22	(4)
- * Club domestic league appearances and goals

Monty Wright (29 May 1931 – 6 April 2012) was an English footballer, who played as a left-footed wing half in the Football League in the 1950s for Stockport County and Chester City F.C.

Monty was in the Leeds United reserves team in 1952-53 and he played with John Charles and Jack Charlton. He retired early from football after suffering a detached retina eye injury. He later went on to run Monty's Newsagents in Farnsfield, Nottinghamshire for 15 years until 1992.

== See also ==
- 1954–55 Chester F.C. season
