= 1953–54 Welsh Cup =

Tournament details
- Country: Wales

Final positions
- Champions: (Wales) Flint Town United
- Runners-up: (England) Chester

The 1953–54 FAW Welsh Cup is the 67th season of the annual knockout tournament for competitive football teams in Wales.

== Key ==
League name pointed after clubs name.

- FL D1 - Football League First Division
- FL D3N - Football League Third Division North
- FL D3S - Football League Third Division South
- SFL - Southern Football League
- WLN - Welsh League North

== Fifth round ==
Eight winners from the Fourth round and ten new clubs. Ebbw Vale & Cwn get a bye.

Tie no	Home	Score	Away
1	Chester (FL D3N)	6–1	Brymbo Steelworks

== Sixth round ==
Three winners from the Fifth round plus Ebbw Vale & Cwn. Six clubs get a bye to the Seventh round.

== Seventh round ==
Two winners from the Sixth round, plus six clubs who get a bye in the previous round.

Tie no	Home	Score	Away
1	Chester (FL D3N)	1–0	Wrexham (FL D3N)

== Semifinal ==
Flint Town United and Cardiff City played at Wrexham, Chester and Newport County played at Cardiff, replay at Wrexham.

Tie no	Home	Score	Away
1	Flint Town United (WLN)	2–1	Cardiff City (FL D1)
2	Chester (FL D3N)	2–2	Newport County (FL D3S)
replay	Chester (FL D3N)	2–0	Newport County (FL D3S)

== Final ==
Final were held at Wrexham.

Tie no	Home	Score	Away
1	Flint Town United (WLN)	2–0	Chester (FL D3N)
