= George Allman (footballer) =

English footballer

Personal information
- Date of birth: 23 July 1930
- Place of birth: Stockport, England
- Date of death: September 2016 (aged 86)
- Place of death: Sheffield, England
- Position: Forward

Senior career*
Years	Team	Apps	(Gls)
1950–1952	Stockport County	7	(1)
1952–1955	Holywell Town		
1955–1957	Chester	49	(13)
1957–19??	Ashton United		
- Mossley
- * Club domestic league appearances and goals

George Allman (23 July 1930 – September 2016) was an English footballer who played as a forward. He made appearances in the Football League for Stockport County and Chester.

== Playing career ==
Allman began his career with his home club of Stockport County, whom he joined in 1950. After two years at Edgeley Park, he moved to Holywell Town before returning to the professional ranks with Chester in the summer of 1955.

He spent two years at Sealand Road but was one of several departures at the end of 1956–57, along with players such as Jack Haines, Bernard Hackett and Jim Collins. He moved to Ashton United and later played for Mossley.

== Bibliography ==
- Sumner, Chas (1997). On the Borderline: The Official History of Chester City F.C. 1885–1997. Yore Publications. ISBN 978-1-874427-52-0.
