= Keith Griffiths (footballer) =

English footballer

Personal information
- Full name: George Keith Griffiths
- Date of birth: 30 December 1927
- Place of birth: Chester, England
- Date of death: August 2015 (aged 87)
- Place of death: Cheshire, England
- Position: Goalkeeper

Senior career*
Years	Team	Apps	(Gls)
1952–1955	Rhyl		
1955–1959	Chester	54	(0)
- * Club domestic league appearances and goals

George Keith Griffiths (30 December 1927 – August 2015) was an English professional footballer who played as a goalkeeper in the Football League for Chester.

== Football career ==
Griffiths began his playing career with Rhyl before joining hometown club Chester in the summer of 1955 along with John Devine. His Football League debut followed on 28 September, in a 3–2 win over Carlisle United at Sealand Road.

He was to spend his first two years as second-choice goalkeeper to Bobby Jones before playing regularly in 1957–58. He remained involved in the first team squad the following season but was restricted to just seven league appearances before moving on.

== Bibliography ==
- Sumner, Chas (1997). On the Borderline: The Official History of Chester City F.C. 1885-1997. Yore Publications. ISBN 978-1-874427-52-0.
