= Ray Griffiths =

Welsh footballer

Personal information
- Full name: Raymond Griffiths
- Date of birth: 26 September 1931 (age 95)
- Place of birth: Llanelli, Wales
- Position: Wing half

Senior career*
Years	Team	Apps	(Gls)
1955–1960	Chester	18	(0)
- * Club domestic league appearances and goals

Ray Griffiths (born 26 September 1931) is a Welsh footballer, who played as a wing half in the Football League for Chester.
