= Jack Basford =

English footballer

Personal information
- Date of birth: 24 July 1925
- Place of birth: Crewe, England
- Date of death: 14 March 1998 (aged 72)
- Place of death: Leek, England
- Position: Centre forward

Youth career
- Wolverhampton Wanderers

Senior career*
| Years | Team | Apps | (Gls) |
| 1947–1953 | Crewe Alexandra | 144 | (58) |
| 1953–1954 | Chester | 10 | (1) |
- Guildford City
| Total | | 154 | (59) |

Managerial career
- 1966–1967: Exeter City
- * Club domestic league appearances and goals

Jack Basford (1925–1998) was an English footballer, who played as a centre forward in the Football League for Crewe Alexandra and Chester.
