= Jimmy Rolfe =

English footballer (1932–2025)

Personal information
- Date of birth: 8 February 1932
- Date of death: 2025 (aged 92–93)
- Position: Outside right

Senior career*
Years	Team	Apps	(Gls)
- Eastham Athletic
- Liverpool
- SC Münster 08
- Liverpool
1953–1955	Chester		
1955–1958	Crewe Alexandra		
1958–1959	Barrow		
1959–?	Buxton		
- Runcorn
- New Brighton
- Holyhead Town
- * Club domestic league appearances and goals

James Rolfe (8 February 1932 – 2025) was a former professional footballer. Predominantly an outside right, Rolfe was also known for his versatility which allowed him to play in many different positions for the likes of Liverpool, Chester and Crewe Alexandra.

== Liverpool ==
Aged 15, Rolfe was spotted playing for adult side Eastham Athletic in the West Cheshire League by Liverpool Scout Keith Peters. Rolfe attended training and manager George Kay was impressed enough to pay a visit to Rolfe's home in the City Centre Tenements and sign him up. Rolfe progressed well through the B and A teams and was picked regularly for the Liverpool County Youth Team which selected the best young players from Liverpool, Everton and other local clubs. Rolfe was part of the County team that reached the semi-finals of the FA Youth Cup in 1950.

Rolfe's progress was halted at the age of 18 due to National Service. Whilst on duty in Germany, Rolfe spent his time as a PT Instructor and played for local side Munster 08. On passing out of the Army, Rolfe returned to Anfield and was signed as a full-time professional by new manager Don Welsh. Rolfe became a regular in the Reserves but struggled to shift the likes of Billy Liddell, Albert Stubbins, Bob Paisley and Ronnie Moran from the First Team. The absence of modern-day features of the game such as substitutes, the League Cup and squad rotation hindered his chances of breaking into the side and he left to join Chester in 1953.

== Chester ==
Rolfe became a regular at the Sealand Road and his performances were not going unnoticed. Interest started to arrive from larger clubs, including Sheffield Wednesday, with manager Harry Catterick attempting to strike a deal to take both Rolfe and fellow ex-Liverpool player Johnny Molyneux to Hillsborough. However, Chester were not prepared to give up their main assets lightly and the pair stayed with The Blues. Rolfe played for Chester in the Final of the Welsh Cup in 1954 but finished up with a runners up medal after his side went down 2–0 to Flint Town in front of 15,000 people at the Racecourse Ground, Wrexham.

== Crewe Alexandra, Barrow and Non-League ==
In 1955, Rolfe left to join Crewe Alexandra and spent three seasons at Gresty Road, racking up over 100 games, including a run of 71 consecutive starts.

In 1958 Rolfe was transferred to Barrow in exchange for goalkeeper Jerry Lowery. While at Barrow, who were then an established Football League club, Tranmere Rovers manager Peter Farrell, an ex-Republic of Ireland international, allowed Rolfe to train with the Prenton Park club on a daily basis due to the long distance between Barrow and his Liverpool home. Rolfe left after just one season with the Bluebirds before enjoying spells with various Non-League teams such as Buxton, Runcorn, New Brighton and Holyhead.

Rolfe played in numerous Testimonials and Charity Games and on occasion featured in teams with the likes of Bert Trautmann and Sir Tom Finney.

== Death ==
Liverpool FC announced the death of Rolfe in October 2025.
