= Mick Betteridge =

English footballer

Personal information
- Full name: Raymond Michael Betteridge
- Date of birth: 11 August 1924
- Place of birth: Alcester, England
- Date of death: 5 April 1999 (aged 74)
- Place of death: Ashbourne, England
- Position: Inside forward

Youth career
- Warslow Celtic

Senior career*
| Years | Team | Apps | (Gls) |
| 1949–1951 | West Bromwich Albion | 5 | (0) |
| 1951–1954 | Swindon Town | 108 | (23) |
| 1954 | Chester | 8 | (1) |
| 1954– | Leek Town | | |
| Total | | 121 | (24) |
- * Club domestic league appearances and goals

Mick Betteridge (11 August 1924 – 5 April 1999) was a footballer who played as an inside forward in the Football League for West Bromwich Albion, Swindon Town and Chester.
