= Johnny Thomas (footballer) =

English footballer

Personal information
- Full name: Johnny Thomas
- Date of birth: 23 December 1926
- Place of birth: Liverpool, England
- Date of death: 5 February 2006 (aged 79)
- Place of death: Melksham, England
- Position: Winger

Youth career
- Everton

Senior career*
Years	Team	Apps	(Gls)
1950–1952	Swindon Town	17	(3)
1952–1953	Headington United		
1953–1954	Chester	29	(5)
1954–1955	Stockport County	6	(0)
1955–1956	Bath City FC	10	(0)
Total		52	(8)
- * Club domestic league appearances and goals

Johnny Thomas (23 December 1926 – 5 February 2006) was an English footballer, who played as a winger in the Football League for Swindon Town, Chester and Stockport County.
