= Joe Hilton (footballer, born 1931) =

English footballer

Personal information
- Full name: Joseph Hilton
- Date of birth: 20 July 1931
- Place of birth: Goldthorpe, England
- Date of death: 1995 (aged 63–64)
- Place of death: Sheffield, England
- Position: Inside forward

Youth career
- Yorkshire Schoolboys X1
- Armthorpe Welfare

Senior career*
Years	Team	Apps	(Gls)
1949–1950	Leeds United	1	(0)
1950–1954	Chester	61	(9)
- Goole Town
Total		62	(9)
- * Club domestic league appearances and goals

Joe Hilton (20 July 1931 – June 1995) was an English professional footballer who played as an inside forward in the Football League for Leeds United and Chester.
