= Jack Capper =

Welsh footballer

Personal information
- Date of birth: 23 July 1931
- Place of birth: Wrexham, Wales
- Date of death: 10 March 2009 (aged 77)
- Place of death: Wrexham, Wales
- Position: Defender

Senior career*
Years	Team	Apps	(Gls)
1949–1955	Wrexham	48	(0)
1955–1956	Headington United		
1956–1959	Lincoln City	21	(0)
1959–1961	Chester	37	(0)
- * Club domestic league appearances and goals

John Capper (23 July 1931 – 10 March 2009) was a Welsh footballer.

== Playing career ==
Capper turned professional with hometown club Wrexham in 1949, with his first appearance in The Football League coming against Grimsby Town in 1952–53.

When Capper left Wrexham in 1955 after 48 league outings he was awarded a benefit match. After a short spell with non-league Headington United, he returned to professional circles with Lincoln City in January 1956. After struggling to command a regular place at Sincil Bank, Capper moved to Chester in September 1959 for £1,500. He competed with the centre back position with George Spruce before retiring from the game through injury in 1961.

Capper later joined the Police and then as a security officer at a holiday camp in Prestatyn.
