= Tommy Roberts (footballer, born 1927) =

English footballer

Personal information
- Date of birth: 28 July 1927
- Place of birth: Liverpool, England
- Date of death: 2001 (aged 73–74)
- Place of death: Birkenhead, England
- Position: Full back

Youth career
- Skelmersdale United

Senior career*
Years	Team	Apps	(Gls)
1951–1954	Blackburn Rovers	6	(0)
1954–1955	Watford	1	(0)
1955–1956	Chester	5	(0)
- Skelmersdale United
Total		12	(0)
- * Club domestic league appearances and goals

Tommy Roberts (1927 – 2001) was an English footballer, who played as a full back in the Football League for Blackburn Rovers, Watford and Chester.
