= Roy Halstead =

English footballer

Personal information
- Full name: Roy Halstead
- Date of birth: 26 July 1931
- Place of birth: Whitworth, England
- Date of death: 6 August 1997 (aged 66)
- Place of death: Whitworth, England
- Position: Inside forward

Senior career*
Years	Team	Apps	(Gls)
1954–1955	Chester	21	(4)
- * Club domestic league appearances and goals

Roy Halstead (26 July 1931 – 6 August 1997) was an English footballer who played as an inside forward in the Football League for Chester.
