= Jerry Lowery =

English footballer (1924–2007)

Personal information
- Full name: Jeremiah Lowery
- Date of birth: 19 October 1924
- Place of birth: Newcastle upon Tyne, England
- Date of death: 1 October 2007 (aged 82)
- Place of death: Southwold, Suffolk
- Position: Goalkeeper

Youth career
- –: Leicester City

Senior career*
Years	Team	Apps	(Gls)
–	C.A. Parsons Athletic		
1947–1952	Newcastle United	6	(0)
1952–1954	Lincoln City	51	(0)
1954–1956	Peterborough United	75	(0)
1956–1958	Barrow	86	(0)
1958–19??	Crewe Alexandra	4	(0)
–	Wisbech Town		
- * Club domestic league appearances and goals

Jeremiah Lowery (19 October 1924 – 1 October 2007) was an English footballer who made 147 appearances in the Football League playing for Newcastle United, Lincoln City, Barrow and Crewe Alexandra. He played as a goalkeeper. He began his career as a youngster before the Second World War with Leicester City, and played for a works team after the war before joining Newcastle United, and also played in the Midland League for Peterborough United and non-league football for Wisbech Town.
