= Jack Hillier (footballer) =

English footballer

Personal information
- Full name: John Kenneth Hillier
- Date of birth: 10 September 1933
- Place of birth: Halsall, England
- Date of death: 9 May 2006 (aged 72)
- Place of death: Lancashire, England
- Position: Goalkeeper

Senior career*
Years	Team	Apps	(Gls)
1954–1955	Chester	6	(0)
- * Club domestic league appearances and goals

Jack Hillier (10 September 1933 – 9 May 2006) was an English footballer, who played as a goalkeeper in the Football League for Chester.
