= 1954–55 Southern Football League =

The 1954–55 Southern Football League season was the 52nd in the history of the league, an English football competition.

No new clubs had joined the league for this season so the league consisted of 22 clubs from previous season. Yeovil Town were champions, winning their first Southern League title. Four Southern League clubs applied to join the Football League at the end of the season, but none were successful.

== League table ==
Southern Football League
- Season: 1954–55
- Champions: Yeovil Town
- Matches: 462
- Goals: 1,735 (3.76 per match)

Pos	Team	Pld	W	D	L	GF	GA	GR	Pts
1	Yeovil Town	42	23	9	10	105	66	1.591	55
2	Weymouth	42	24	7	11	105	84	1.250	55
3	Hastings United	42	21	9	12	94	60	1.567	51
4	Cheltenham Town	42	21	8	13	85	72	1.181	50
5	Guildford City	42	20	8	14	72	59	1.220	48
6	Worcester City	42	19	10	13	80	73	1.096	48
7	Barry Town	42	16	15	11	82	87	0.943	47
8	Gloucester City	42	16	13	13	66	54	1.222	45
9	Bath City	42	18	9	15	73	80	0.913	45
10	Headington United	42	18	7	17	82	62	1.323	43
11	Kidderminster Harriers	42	18	7	17	84	86	0.977	43
12	Merthyr Tydfil	42	17	8	17	97	94	1.032	42
13	Exeter City Reserves	42	19	4	19	67	78	0.859	42
14	Lovell's Athletic	42	15	11	16	71	68	1.044	41
15	Kettering Town	42	15	11	16	70	69	1.014	41
16	Hereford United	42	17	5	20	91	72	1.264	39
17	Llanelly	42	16	7	19	78	81	0.963	39
18	Bedford Town	42	16	3	23	75	103	0.728	35
19	Tonbridge	42	11	8	23	68	91	0.747	30
20	Dartford	42	9	12	21	55	76	0.724	30
21	Chelmsford City	42	11	6	25	73	111	0.658	28
22	Gravesend & Northfleet	42	9	9	24	62	97	0.639	27

Source: rsssf.com
Rules for classification: 1) points; 2) goal ratio.

== Football League elections ==
Four Southern League clubs applied for election to the Football League. However, none were successful as all four League clubs were re-elected.

Club	League	Votes
Grimsby Town	Football League	49
Chester	Football League	47
Colchester United	Football League	44
Walsall	Football League	33
Peterborough United	Midland League	16
Worcester City	Southern League	3
Headington United	Southern League	2
Wigan Athletic	Lancashire Combination	2
Bedford Town	Southern League	0
Burton Albion	Birmingham & District League	0
Nelson	Lancashire Combination	0
North Shields	North Eastern League	0
Yeovil Town	Southern League	0
