= Brian Blears =

Welsh footballer

Personal information
- Date of birth: 18 November 1933
- Place of birth: Prestatyn, Wales
- Date of death: 10 November 2005 (aged 71)
- Place of death: Chester, England
- Position: Wing half

Youth career
- Everton

Senior career*
Years	Team	Apps	(Gls)
1954–1956	Chester	2	(0)
1956–	Northwich Victoria		
Total		2	(0)
- * Club domestic league appearances and goals

Brian Blears was a footballer who played as a wing half in the Football League for Chester.
