= 1953–54 Football League =

55th season of the Football League

The Football League
- Season: 1953–54
- Champions: Wolverhampton Wanderers

The 1953–54 season was the 55th completed season of The Football League, which ran from August 1953 until April 1954.

== Final league tables ==
The tables below are reproduced here in the exact form that they can be found at The Rec.Sport.Soccer Statistics Foundation website and in Rothmans Book of Football League Records 1888–89 to 1978–79, with home and away statistics separated.

Beginning with the season 1894–95, clubs finishing level on points were separated according to goal average (goals scored divided by goals conceded), or more properly put, goal ratio. In case one or more teams had the same goal difference, this system favoured those teams who had scored fewer goals. The goal average system was eventually scrapped beginning with the 1976–77 season.

From the 1922–23 season, the bottom two teams of both Third Division North and Third Division South were required to apply for re-election.

== First Division ==
First Division
- Season: 1953–54
- Champions: Wolverhampton Wanderers; 1st English title
- Relegated: Middlesbrough; Liverpool
- Matches: 462
- Goals: 1,626 (3.52 per match)
- Top goalscorer: Jimmy Glazzard (29 goals)
- Biggest home win: Charlton Athletic 8–1 Middlesbrough (12 September 1953); Wolverhampton Wanderers 8–1 Chelsea (26 September 1953)
- Biggest away win: Cardiff City 1–6 Manchester United (14 November 1953)
- Highest scoring: Newcastle United 3–7 West Bromwich Albion (16 September 1953)
- Longest winning run: 6 matches Charlton Athletic
- Longest unbeaten run: 18 matches Wolverhampton Wanderers
- Longest losing run: 5 matches Liverpool

Wolverhampton Wanderers won the First Division title for the first time in their history, finishing four points ahead of their local rivals West Bromwich Albion, who lifted their fourth FA Cup in the same season. Defending champions Arsenal slumped to 12th.

Middlesbrough and Liverpool were relegated to the Second Division; this is the last time Liverpool has been relegated from any division. They would compete in the Second Division until promotion in 1962, and have remained in the top flight ever since.

Pos	Team	Pld	W	D	L	GF	GA	GAv	Pts	Relegation
1	Wolverhampton Wanderers (C)	42	25	7	10	96	56	1.714	57	
2	West Bromwich Albion	42	22	9	11	86	63	1.365	53	
3	Huddersfield Town	42	20	11	11	78	61	1.279	51	
4	Manchester United	42	18	12	12	73	58	1.259	48	
5	Bolton Wanderers	42	18	12	12	75	60	1.250	48	
6	Blackpool	42	19	10	13	80	69	1.159	48	
7	Burnley	42	21	4	17	78	67	1.164	46	
8	Chelsea	42	16	12	14	74	68	1.088	44	
9	Charlton Athletic	42	19	6	17	75	77	0.974	44	
10	Cardiff City	42	18	8	16	51	71	0.718	44	
11	Preston North End	42	19	5	18	87	58	1.500	43	
12	Arsenal	42	15	13	14	75	73	1.027	43	
13	Aston Villa	42	16	9	17	70	68	1.029	41	
14	Portsmouth	42	14	11	17	81	89	0.910	39	
15	Newcastle United	42	14	10	18	72	77	0.935	38	
16	Tottenham Hotspur	42	16	5	21	65	76	0.855	37	
17	Manchester City	42	14	9	19	62	77	0.805	37	
18	Sunderland	42	14	8	20	81	89	0.910	36	
19	Sheffield Wednesday	42	15	6	21	70	91	0.769	36	
20	Sheffield United	42	11	11	20	69	90	0.767	33	
21	Middlesbrough (R)	42	10	10	22	60	91	0.659	30	Relegation to the Second Division
22	Liverpool (R)	42	9	10	23	68	97	0.701	28	Relegation to the Second Division

Source: World Football
Rules for classification: 1) Points; 2) Goal average; 3) Goals scored
(C) Champions; (R) Relegated

=== Results ===
Home \ Away	ARS	AST	BLP	BOL	BUR	CAR	CHA	CHE	HUD	LIV	MCI	MUN	MID	NEW	POR	PNE	SHU	SHW	SUN	TOT	WBA	WOL
Arsenal		1–1	1–1	4–3	2–5	1–1	3–3	1–2	0–0	3–0	2–2	3–1	3–1	2–1	3–0	3–2	1–1	4–1	1–4	0–3	2–2	2–3
Aston Villa	2–1		2–1	2–2	5–1	1–2	2–1	2–2	2–2	2–1	3–0	2–2	5–3	1–2	1–1	1–0	4–0	2–1	3–1	1–2	6–1	1–2
Blackpool	2–2	3–2		0–0	2–0	4–1	3–1	2–1	3–1	3–0	2–0	2–0	0–0	1–3	1–1	4–2	2–2	1–2	3–0	1–0	4–1	0–0
Bolton Wanderers	3–1	3–0	3–2		0–0	3–0	3–1	2–2	0–0	2–0	3–2	0–0	3–2	2–2	6–1	0–2	2–1	2–1	3–1	2–0	2–1	1–1
Burnley	2–1	3–2	2–1	1–1		3–0	2–0	1–2	2–1	1–1	3–1	2–0	5–0	1–2	1–0	2–1	2–1	4–1	5–1	4–2	1–4	4–1
Cardiff City	0–3	2–1	0–1	1–1	1–0		5–0	0–0	2–1	3–1	0–3	1–6	1–0	2–1	3–2	2–1	2–0	2–2	1–1	1–0	2–0	1–3
Charlton Athletic	1–5	1–1	4–2	1–0	3–1	3–2		1–1	2–1	6–0	2–1	1–0	8–1	0–0	3–1	2–1	3–0	4–2	5–3	0–1	1–1	0–2
Chelsea	0–2	1–2	5–1	2–0	2–1	2–0	3–1		2–2	5–2	0–1	3–1	1–1	1–2	4–3	1–0	1–2	0–1	2–2	1–0	5–0	4–2
Huddersfield Town	2–2	4–0	0–0	2–1	3–1	2–0	4–1	3–1		2–0	1–1	0–0	2–1	3–2	5–1	2–2	2–2	2–0	2–1	2–5	0–2	2–1
Liverpool	1–2	6–1	5–2	1–2	4–0	0–1	2–3	1–1	1–3		2–2	4–4	4–1	2–2	3–1	1–5	3–0	2–2	4–3	2–2	0–0	1–1
Manchester City	0–0	0–1	1–4	3–0	3–2	1–1	3–0	1–1	0–1	0–2		2–0	5–2	0–0	2–1	1–4	2–1	3–2	2–1	4–1	2–3	0–4
Manchester United	2–2	1–0	4–1	1–5	1–2	2–3	2–0	1–1	3–1	5–1	1–1		2–2	1–1	2–0	1–0	2–2	5–2	1–0	2–0	1–3	1–0
Middlesbrough	2–0	2–1	0–1	3–2	1–3	0–0	0–2	3–3	0–3	0–1	0–1	1–4		2–3	2–2	0–4	2–0	4–1	0–0	3–0	1–1	3–3
Newcastle United	5–2	0–1	2–1	2–3	3–1	4–0	0–2	1–1	0–2	4–0	4–3	1–2	2–3		1–1	0–4	4–1	3–0	2–1	1–3	3–7	1–2
Portsmouth	1–1	2–1	4–4	3–2	3–2	1–1	3–1	3–2	5–2	5–1	4–1	1–1	0–2	2–0		1–3	3–4	2–1	4–1	1–1	3–0	2–0
Preston North End	0–1	1–1	2–3	3–1	2–1	1–2	2–0	1–0	1–2	2–1	4–0	1–3	1–0	2–2	4–0		2–1	6–0	6–2	2–1	0–2	0–1
Sheffield United	1–0	2–1	3–4	3–0	2–1	0–1	1–1	1–3	3–6	3–1	2–2	1–3	2–2	3–1	3–1	1–1		2–0	1–3	5–2	1–2	3–3
Sheffield Wednesday	2–1	3–1	1–2	2–1	2–0	2–1	1–2	2–0	1–4	1–1	2–0	0–1	4–2	3–0	4–4	4–2	3–2		2–2	2–1	2–3	0–0
Sunderland	7–1	2–0	3–2	1–2	2–1	5–0	2–1	1–2	1–1	3–2	4–5	0–2	0–2	1–1	3–1	2–2	2–2	2–4		4–3	2–1	3–2
Tottenham Hotspur	1–4	1–0	2–2	3–2	2–3	0–1	3–1	2–1	1–0	2–1	3–0	1–1	4–1	3–0	1–1	2–6	2–1	3–1	0–3		0–1	2–3
West Bromwich Albion	2–0	1–1	2–1	1–1	0–0	6–1	2–3	5–2	4–0	5–2	1–0	2–0	2–1	2–2	2–3	3–2	2–2	4–2	2–0	3–0		0–1
Wolverhampton Wanderers	0–2	1–2	4–1	1–1	1–2	3–1	5–0	8–1	4–0	2–1	3–1	3–1	2–4	3–2	4–3	1–0	6–1	4–1	3–1	2–0	1–0	

Updated to match(es) played on unknown. Source: Ian Laschke: Rothmans Book of Football League Records 1888–89 to 1978–79. Macdonald and Jane’s, London & Sydney, 1980.
Legend: Blue = home team win; Yellow = draw; Red = away team win.

=== Maps ===
Locations of the Football League First Division London teams 1953–1954
Locations of the Football League First Division 1953–1954 teams

== Second Division ==
Second Division
- Season: 1953–54
- Champions: Leicester City
- Promoted: Leicester City; Everton
- Relegated: Brentford; Oldham Athletic
- Matches: 462
- Goals: 1,535 (3.32 per match)
- Top goalscorer: John Charles (42 goals)

Pos	Team	Pld	W	D	L	GF	GA	GAv	Pts	Qualification or relegation
1	Leicester City (C, P)	42	23	10	9	97	60	1.617	56	Promotion to the First Division
2	Everton (P)	42	20	16	6	92	58	1.586	56	Promotion to the First Division
3	Blackburn Rovers	42	23	9	10	86	50	1.720	55	
4	Nottingham Forest	42	20	12	10	86	59	1.458	52	
5	Rotherham United	42	21	7	14	80	67	1.194	49	
6	Luton Town	42	18	12	12	64	59	1.085	48	
7	Birmingham City	42	18	11	13	78	58	1.345	47	
8	Fulham	42	17	10	15	98	85	1.153	44	
9	Bristol Rovers	42	14	16	12	64	58	1.103	44	
10	Leeds United	42	15	13	14	89	81	1.099	43	
11	Stoke City	42	12	17	13	71	60	1.183	41	
12	Doncaster Rovers	42	16	9	17	59	63	0.937	41	
13	West Ham United	42	15	9	18	67	69	0.971	39	
14	Notts County	42	13	13	16	54	74	0.730	39	
15	Hull City	42	16	6	20	64	66	0.970	38	
16	Lincoln City	42	14	9	19	65	83	0.783	37	
17	Bury	42	11	14	17	54	72	0.750	36	
18	Derby County	42	12	11	19	64	82	0.780	35	
19	Plymouth Argyle	42	9	16	17	65	82	0.793	34	
20	Swansea Town	42	13	8	21	58	82	0.707	34	
21	Brentford (R)	42	10	11	21	40	78	0.513	31	Relegation to the Third Division South
22	Oldham Athletic (R)	42	8	9	25	40	89	0.449	25	Relegation to the Third Division North

Rules for classification: 1) Points; 2) Goal average; 3) Goals scored
(C) Champions; (P) Promoted; (R) Relegated

=== Results ===
Home \ Away	BIR	BLB	BRE	BRR	BRY	DER	DON	EVE	FUL	HUL	LEE	LEI	LIN	LUT	NOT	NTC	OLD	PLY	ROT	STK	SWA	WHU
Birmingham		0–0	5–1	1–1	0–0	3–0	0–1	5–1	2–2	2–0	3–3	1–2	1–0	5–1	2–2	3–0	2–1	3–0	2–3	1–0	6–0	2–0
Blackburn Rovers	3–0		2–2	1–1	4–2	0–3	2–0	0–0	5–1	3–1	2–2	3–0	6–0	2–0	2–0	2–0	4–0	2–3	3–0	3–0	1–0	4–1
Brentford	2–0	1–4		0–3	2–1	0–0	1–4	1–0	2–1	2–2	2–1	1–3	0–1	0–1	1–1	0–0	3–1	1–0	0–1	0–0	3–1	3–1
Bristol Rovers	1–1	1–2	0–0		2–0	3–0	0–1	0–0	2–1	4–2	1–1	3–0	0–1	3–3	1–0	1–1	1–0	3–1	1–0	3–2	0–1	2–2
Bury	1–1	0–0	1–1	3–1		4–0	2–1	2–2	1–3	3–0	4–4	2–5	1–1	0–1	2–1	3–3	1–0	3–0	3–0	0–6	1–2	2–0
Derby County	2–4	2–2	4–1	0–1	3–1		2–0	2–6	3–3	2–0	0–2	2–1	2–0	1–2	1–2	0–0	3–1	1–4	1–1	1–1	4–2	2–1
Doncaster Rovers	3–1	0–2	3–0	1–0	0–1	1–3		2–2	2–2	4–1	0–0	0–2	1–1	1–3	1–3	4–2	1–0	3–3	1–2	1–0	1–0	2–0
Everton	1–0	1–1	6–1	4–0	0–0	3–2	4–1		2–2	2–0	2–1	1–2	3–1	2–1	3–3	3–2	3–1	8–4	3–0	1–1	2–2	1–2
Fulham	5–2	2–3	4–1	4–4	3–0	5–2	1–2	0–0		5–1	1–3	1–1	4–1	5–1	3–1	4–3	3–1	3–1	2–4	0–1	4–3	3–4
Hull City	3–0	0–2	2–0	4–1	3–0	3–0	3–1	1–3	2–1		1–1	0–3	3–0	1–2	3–0	0–2	8–0	2–0	1–0	1–2	4–3	2–1
Leeds United	1–1	3–2	4–0	3–3	3–4	3–1	3–1	3–1	1–2	0–0		7–1	5–2	2–1	0–2	6–0	2–1	1–1	4–2	1–1	3–2	1–2
Leicester City	3–4	4–0	6–0	1–0	2–0	2–2	2–0	2–2	2–2	1–3	5–0		9–2	2–1	1–0	2–2	1–0	4–2	4–1	4–0	4–1	2–1
Lincoln City	0–1	8–0	2–1	1–2	0–0	2–2	0–2	1–1	4–2	3–0	2–0	3–1		1–1	2–2	3–0	3–1	2–0	4–3	1–1	3–1	1–2
Luton Town	2–0	2–1	1–1	1–1	3–2	2–1	2–0	1–1	1–2	3–1	1–1	2–2	1–0		0–1	2–1	4–4	2–1	1–1	0–1	2–0	3–1
Nottingham Forest	1–1	0–1	2–1	3–1	2–2	4–2	2–2	3–3	4–1	2–0	5–2	3–1	4–2	2–1		5–0	1–1	3–0	4–1	5–4	2–1	4–0
Notts County	2–1	0–5	2–0	1–5	0–0	0–1	1–5	0–2	0–0	1–1	2–0	1–1	1–1	1–2	1–1		2–0	2–0	1–2	2–1	3–0	3–1
Oldham Athletic	2–3	1–0	2–0	0–0	0–0	0–0	2–2	0–4	2–3	0–0	4–2	0–2	1–0	1–2	1–3	1–3		1–1	2–3	1–0	2–2	3–1
Plymouth Argyle	2–2	1–1	3–2	3–3	1–1	3–2	0–0	4–0	2–2	2–2	1–1	0–3	1–2	2–2	1–0	3–3	5–0		0–2	1–1	1–1	2–1
Rotherham United	1–0	1–4	1–1	1–1	1–0	5–2	4–0	1–2	3–2	3–2	2–4	1–1	4–1	2–1	3–0	0–1	7–0	2–1		2–2	2–1	5–0
Stoke City	3–2	3–0	1–1	3–2	4–0	2–2	2–2	2–4	1–3	0–1	4–0	2–2	4–1	1–1	1–1	0–1	0–1	3–2	1–1		5–0	1–1
Swansea Town	1–3	2–1	1–0	3–1	2–1	2–1	0–1	0–2	2–0	1–0	4–3	0–0	4–2	1–1	2–1	2–2	4–0	0–1	0–2	2–2		1–1
West Ham United	1–2	2–1	0–1	1–1	5–0	0–0	2–1	1–1	3–1	1–0	5–2	4–1	5–0	1–0	1–1	1–2	0–1	2–2	3–0	2–2	4–1	

Updated to match(es) played on unknown. Source: Ian Laschke: Rothmans Book of Football League Records 1888–89 to 1978–79. Macdonald and Jane’s, London & Sydney, 1980.
Legend: Blue = home team win; Yellow = draw; Red = away team win.

=== Maps ===
Locations of the Football League Second Division London teams 1953–1954
Locations of the Football League Second Division 1953–1954 teams

== Third Division North ==
Football League Third Division North
- Season: 1953–54
- Champions: Port Vale (2nd title)
- Failed re-election: none
- Matches: 552
- Goals: 1,587 (2.88 per match)
- Top goalscorer: Alan Ashman (Carlisle United), 30

Pos	Team	Pld	W	D	L	GF	GA	GAv	Pts	Promotion or relegation
1	Port Vale (C, P)	46	26	17	3	74	21	3.524	69	Promotion to the Second Division
2	Barnsley	46	24	10	12	77	57	1.351	58	
3	Scunthorpe & Lindsey United	46	21	15	10	77	56	1.375	57	
4	Gateshead	46	21	13	12	74	55	1.345	55	
5	Bradford City	46	22	9	15	60	55	1.091	53	
6	Chesterfield	46	19	14	13	76	64	1.188	52	
7	Mansfield Town	46	20	11	15	88	67	1.313	51	
8	Wrexham	46	21	9	16	81	68	1.191	51	
9	Bradford (Park Avenue)	46	18	14	14	77	68	1.132	50	
10	Stockport County	46	18	11	17	77	67	1.149	47	
11	Southport	46	17	12	17	63	60	1.050	46	
12	Barrow	46	16	12	18	72	71	1.014	44	
13	Carlisle United	46	14	15	17	83	71	1.169	43	
14	Tranmere Rovers	46	18	7	21	59	70	0.843	43	
15	Accrington Stanley	46	16	10	20	66	74	0.892	42	
16	Crewe Alexandra	46	14	13	19	49	67	0.731	41	
17	Grimsby Town	46	16	9	21	51	77	0.662	41	
18	Hartlepools United	46	13	14	19	59	65	0.908	40	
19	Rochdale	46	15	10	21	59	77	0.766	40	
20	Workington	46	13	14	19	59	80	0.738	40	
21	Darlington	46	12	14	20	50	71	0.704	38	
22	York City	46	12	13	21	64	86	0.744	37	
23	Halifax Town	46	12	10	24	44	73	0.603	34	Re-elected
24	Chester	46	11	10	25	48	67	0.716	32	Re-elected

Source: rsssf.com
(C) Division Champions; (P) Promoted

=== Results ===
Home \ Away	ACC	BAR	BRW	BRA	BPA	CRL	CHE	CHF	CRE	DAR	GAT	GRI	HAL	HAR	MAN	PTV	ROC	SCU	SOU	STP	TRA	WRK	WRE	YOR
Accrington Stanley		3–0	3–2	0–1	0–0	2–2	1–0	2–2	2–1	0–0	2–2	3–1	3–0	2–0	5–1	2–2	1–0	0–1	1–1	2–1	0–1	4–2	1–2	2–0
Barnsley	5–0		3–2	4–2	2–1	1–1	3–0	4–1	1–1	5–1	0–2	0–0	1–2	3–2	2–1	0–1	2–1	0–1	2–1	4–1	3–0	4–2	3–0	2–1
Barrow	4–3	0–1		3–0	4–1	1–1	2–1	2–2	3–1	2–2	0–0	4–0	1–1	1–1	4–2	0–0	4–2	1–2	2–3	1–0	2–1	0–1	1–0	4–1
Bradford City	1–0	1–0	1–0		3–0	1–0	1–0	2–0	3–0	2–0	2–2	3–0	2–0	1–1	2–2	1–1	4–0	1–3	4–1	1–1	1–0	1–1	1–2	1–0
Bradford Park Avenue	6–4	0–2	2–1	4–0		2–4	5–0	1–1	1–1	2–2	3–1	4–1	4–2	5–0	1–0	1–2	2–2	2–2	1–1	3–2	1–2	3–1	2–0	2–0
Carlisle United	2–1	2–4	2–2	2–0	0–1		1–1	2–3	5–0	1–1	1–0	3–3	5–0	2–3	5–0	0–0	7–0	5–1	3–2	2–0	0–2	2–2	0–0	1–1
Chester	3–0	1–1	1–1	3–0	2–3	0–1		2–2	2–0	2–2	5–0	1–1	3–1	1–1	0–2	0–1	2–0	0–0	1–0	1–2	1–2	3–0	2–1	3–1
Chesterfield	0–0	1–1	1–1	2–3	5–1	5–0	4–0		0–2	1–1	1–1	1–0	1–2	2–1	0–0	1–2	2–1	1–0	2–0	4–0	2–1	1–0	1–0	3–2
Crewe Alexandra	0–3	3–2	2–0	1–2	1–1	0–0	1–0	2–0		1–0	3–1	1–1	3–1	3–0	0–0	0–0	2–1	1–1	0–0	1–5	1–2	2–3	1–2	1–1
Darlington	4–1	1–1	1–3	1–0	2–1	3–2	1–0	3–2	0–1		0–2	3–0	1–1	0–1	1–2	0–3	0–0	3–0	0–1	1–0	2–1	3–0	0–2	1–3
Gateshead	4–0	0–0	1–0	1–0	0–1	2–2	2–1	3–3	2–0	1–2		7–1	4–0	1–3	1–3	1–0	2–1	0–0	1–0	4–2	2–1	4–1	3–1	3–0
Grimsby Town	2–0	0–1	1–0	1–0	0–0	3–2	0–0	1–1	3–1	1–0	2–0		2–1	3–0	0–2	2–2	3–2	0–1	1–2	1–0	1–0	1–0	0–0	3–0
Halifax Town	2–0	1–2	2–0	0–1	2–2	2–0	1–1	2–1	1–0	0–0	0–0	2–0		1–0	2–0	0–1	1–1	0–3	1–2	0–1	1–1	3–0	0–2	2–3
Hartlepool	0–1	0–1	2–2	1–1	0–2	1–1	2–0	0–1	0–0	1–0	1–0	3–0	2–0		3–1	2–1	6–0	3–2	1–1	6–0	1–2	2–2	1–1	2–2
Mansfield Town	1–1	2–0	2–3	0–0	1–1	2–1	2–1	2–2	6–0	6–0	1–1	5–1	3–1	1–0		1–2	2–0	2–1	4–2	3–1	2–0	0–2	4–0	7–2
Port Vale	1–0	0–0	4–0	3–0	2–0	1–0	1–0	2–2	1–0	1–1	0–0	2–0	2–0	3–1	1–1		6–0	0–0	0–0	7–0	2–0	2–0	2–0	5–0
Rochdale	1–0	1–1	1–0	3–2	0–1	2–1	4–0	0–1	4–1	3–0	0–1	4–1	0–1	2–2	1–0	0–0		1–1	2–0	0–0	0–1	4–2	6–2	1–2
Scunthorpe & Lindsey United	1–2	6–0	3–2	2–1	4–1	2–1	1–0	2–1	2–2	1–1	1–1	2–1	3–2	0–0	2–2	0–2	1–1		1–1	2–0	3–1	4–1	3–1	3–0
Southport	5–3	5–2	0–1	0–1	1–0	3–0	0–1	2–1	1–2	3–0	2–4	2–1	1–0	2–1	2–1	0–0	1–1	4–3		1–2	0–0	1–1	4–0	1–1
Stockport County	1–1	3–0	5–1	5–0	4–1	3–2	5–0	6–1	1–0	2–0	0–1	3–2	1–1	1–0	3–2	1–1	1–2	1–1	1–1		6–0	2–0	2–2	0–1
Tranmere	1–0	0–1	1–0	0–1	1–1	1–2	2–1	1–2	1–0	1–0	1–4	2–4	1–0	3–2	2–5	1–3	5–1	1–1	2–0	2–2		4–2	6–1	1–1
Workington	3–1	2–0	1–1	2–2	1–1	2–2	2–0	2–1	1–2	1–1	2–0	2–0	3–1	0–0	1–1	2–0	0–1	1–3	0–1	0–0	2–1		1–1	5–2
Wrexham	4–2	1–1	1–2	0–1	2–0	4–2	2–1	1–2	1–1	4–2	5–1	4–0	5–0	2–0	2–0	1–1	2–0	3–1	2–1	1–0	3–0	8–0		1–1
York City	1–2	0–2	5–2	3–2	0–0	1–3	2–1	1–3	0–3	3–3	1–1	1–2	1–1	5–0	5–1	0–1	1–2	2–0	2–1	0–0	0–0	0–0	5–2	

Updated to match(es) played on unknown. Source: Ian Laschke: Rothmans Book of Football League Records 1888–89 to 1978–79. Macdonald and Jane’s, London & Sydney, 1980.
Legend: Blue = home team win; Yellow = draw; Red = away team win.

=== Maps ===
Locations of the Football League Third Division North teams 1953–1954

== Third Division South ==
Football League Third Division South
- Season: 1953–54
- Champions: Ipswich Town (1st title)
- Failed re-election: none
- Matches: 552
- Goals: 1,695 (3.07 per match)
- Top goalscorer: Jack English (Northampton Town), 28

Pos	Team	Pld	W	D	L	GF	GA	GAv	Pts	Promotion or relegation
1	Ipswich Town (C, P)	46	27	10	9	82	51	1.608	64	Promotion to the Second Division
2	Brighton & Hove Albion	46	26	9	11	86	61	1.410	61	
3	Bristol City	46	25	6	15	88	66	1.333	56	
4	Watford	46	21	10	15	85	69	1.232	52	
5	Northampton Town	46	20	11	15	82	55	1.491	51	
6	Southampton	46	22	7	17	76	63	1.206	51	
7	Norwich City	46	20	11	15	73	66	1.106	51	
8	Reading	46	20	9	17	86	73	1.178	49	
9	Exeter City	46	20	8	18	68	58	1.172	48	
10	Gillingham	46	19	10	17	61	66	0.924	48	
11	Leyton Orient	46	18	11	17	79	73	1.082	47	
12	Millwall	46	19	9	18	74	77	0.961	47	
13	Torquay United	46	17	12	17	81	88	0.920	46	
14	Coventry City	46	18	9	19	61	56	1.089	45	
15	Newport County	46	19	6	21	61	81	0.753	44	
16	Southend United	46	18	7	21	69	71	0.972	43	
17	Aldershot	46	17	9	20	74	86	0.860	43	
18	Queens Park Rangers	46	16	10	20	60	68	0.882	42	
19	Bournemouth & Boscombe Athletic	46	16	8	22	67	70	0.957	40	
20	Swindon Town	46	15	10	21	67	70	0.957	40	
21	Shrewsbury Town	46	14	12	20	65	76	0.855	40	
22	Crystal Palace	46	14	12	20	60	86	0.698	40	
23	Colchester United	46	10	10	26	50	78	0.641	30	Re-elected
24	Walsall	46	9	8	29	40	87	0.460	26	Re-elected

Source: rsssf.com
(C) Champions; (P) Promoted

=== Results ===
Home \ Away	ALD	B&BA	B&HA	BRI	COL	COV	CRY	EXE	GIL	IPS	LEY	MIL	NPC	NOR	NWC	QPR	REA	SHR	SOU	STD	SWI	TOR	WAL	WAT
Aldershot		1–2	2–3	2–5	3–0	4–2	1–2	1–2	1–2	3–0	1–1	1–1	2–0	3–1	0–0	1–4	2–2	1–0	1–1	4–0	1–0	4–1	3–1	3–1
Bournemouth & Boscombe Athletic	1–1		1–1	5–2	4–2	1–0	2–0	4–1	4–1	2–3	1–2	4–1	1–1	2–1	2–0	0–1	1–1	2–1	3–1	0–1	4–0	1–2	1–1	1–3
Brighton & Hove Albion	3–2	3–0		2–1	1–0	3–1	3–0	2–1	3–1	1–2	2–1	4–0	4–2	3–2	0–0	3–1	3–2	2–3	2–1	3–2	1–1	1–2	5–3	3–3
Bristol City	4–0	1–1	1–1		3–0	1–0	4–0	5–1	1–1	2–3	1–0	2–1	3–0	2–1	3–1	1–2	3–1	3–1	1–0	4–1	5–1	3–0	4–1	2–1
Colchester United	3–0	1–1	1–1	0–2		0–3	4–1	0–1	0–1	1–2	1–0	3–0	2–2	1–1	0–1	5–0	2–4	3–1	0–1	0–1	2–2	3–1	1–1	2–2
Coventry City	2–1	2–0	1–2	3–0	2–1		0–0	2–0	2–1	1–3	4–0	0–0	1–2	0–0	1–0	3–1	1–1	2–1	2–1	1–0	0–0	4–0	2–0	0–1
Crystal Palace	0–0	3–1	1–1	1–2	0–1	3–1		0–0	1–2	1–1	2–2	2–3	3–0	2–2	1–0	0–3	1–0	3–2	4–3	4–2	3–2	4–1	1–0	1–1
Exeter City	1–3	1–0	0–1	0–1	1–2	4–0	7–0		1–2	1–2	2–1	4–1	1–0	1–0	0–2	0–0	2–0	0–1	4–0	1–1	3–1	1–2	2–1	2–1
Gillingham	1–3	1–0	0–0	2–2	2–0	2–0	3–2	0–1		1–1	1–2	2–0	0–1	2–1	3–1	1–0	3–0	2–0	2–0	3–1	1–0	0–4	3–0	2–3
Ipswich Town	4–0	2–1	2–3	2–1	3–0	4–1	2–0	1–1	6–1		3–1	1–1	1–2	2–1	1–1	2–1	0–1	0–0	2–1	1–1	2–0	2–1	3–0	1–0
Leyton Orient	1–2	5–0	0–2	4–1	3–1	1–0	2–0	3–1	3–1	1–2		2–2	3–0	2–0	3–1	2–2	2–1	2–0	1–4	1–1	1–1	3–2	2–1	1–1
Millwall	2–0	2–1	0–2	1–0	0–0	1–2	2–2	2–1	3–1	1–2	0–3		3–1	1–0	1–3	4–0	2–0	3–1	2–1	2–1	6–1	2–2	3–0	1–0
Newport County	2–2	4–0	1–0	3–2	1–1	2–1	1–3	0–3	1–0	1–2	1–1	0–0		2–0	4–1	2–1	4–1	2–1	0–4	3–2	2–0	2–0	4–2	0–1
Northampton Town	6–2	2–1	4–2	3–0	3–0	0–1	6–0	2–2	1–1	1–0	2–2	4–2	1–0		2–0	2–1	1–1	1–0	3–0	5–0	2–0	3–1	5–1	4–1
Norwich City	3–3	1–3	1–0	1–1	2–1	2–1	2–1	1–2	0–0	1–2	3–1	4–3	2–0	4–1		2–2	2–3	1–0	1–0	1–0	2–2	0–1	3–0	4–1
Queens Park Rangers	0–2	2–1	1–2	0–1	0–0	0–3	1–1	0–0	3–1	3–1	2–1	4–0	5–1	1–1	0–2		2–0	0–0	0–1	1–0	0–2	5–1	2–0	0–4
Reading	6–1	0–1	2–1	0–2	2–0	4–3	4–1	4–1	0–1	3–1	1–1	2–4	4–1	2–0	4–4	3–1		1–1	4–1	2–0	3–1	2–4	0–2	4–1
Shrewsbury Town	0–2	1–1	3–1	4–3	3–1	1–1	1–1	1–1	0–0	1–1	3–3	3–1	2–1	2–4	4–0	1–1	0–3		3–2	2–1	1–0	2–1	4–1	6–4
Southampton	2–0	2–1	1–0	4–2	2–1	2–1	3–1	2–0	1–0	1–1	4–1	4–2	4–0	1–0	0–0	3–1	1–1	4–2		3–5	3–1	2–2	0–0	2–0
Southend	2–1	2–1	2–0	0–1	3–0	2–2	1–2	0–1	1–1	3–1	2–1	1–2	0–1	2–0	5–2	4–1	1–2	3–0	2–1		3–1	1–0	3–1	3–0
Swindon Town	3–1	2–1	0–1	5–0	3–0	1–1	1–1	2–4	2–1	1–2	2–1	2–1	7–1	0–0	0–0	0–1	1–0	2–1	0–1	3–0		6–1	3–0	2–2
Torquay United	3–0	2–0	2–3	4–0	3–1	1–1	1–0	3–2	3–3	1–1	2–3	2–2	3–2	1–1	2–4	2–2	2–2	2–0	1–1	1–1	2–1		3–1	2–2
Walsall	0–2	1–0	3–1	0–0	2–3	1–0	1–0	1–1	1–1	0–2	4–2	0–2	0–1	0–1	1–4	2–0	1–3	0–0	1–0	2–0	0–1	1–3		0–0
Watford	6–1	2–3	1–1	2–0	3–0	1–0	4–1	0–2	6–1	1–0	3–1	2–1	1–0	1–1	1–3	0–2	3–0	3–1	2–0	2–2	2–1	3–1	3–1	

Updated to match(es) played on unknown. Source: Ian Laschke: Rothmans Book of Football League Records 1888–89 to 1978–79. Macdonald and Jane’s, London & Sydney, 1980.
Legend: Blue = home team win; Yellow = draw; Red = away team win.

=== Maps ===
Locations of the Football League Third Division South London teams 1953–1954
Locations of the Football League Third Division South teams 1953–1954

== Attendances ==
=== Division One ===
No.	Club	Average
1	Arsenal FC	50,278
2	Chelsea FC	46,944
3	Newcastle United FC	45,392
4	Sunderland AFC	42,505
5	Tottenham Hotspur FC	41,641
6	Liverpool FC	40,488
7	West Bromwich Albion FC	38,110
8	Wolverhampton Wanderers FC	36,340
9	Manchester United	35,458
10	Sheffield Wednesday FC	35,220
11	Bolton Wanderers FC	34,216
12	Cardiff City FC	32,410
13	Sheffield United FC	31,313
14	Huddersfield Town AFC	30,820
15	Manchester City FC	30,155
16	Aston Villa FC	29,985
17	Portsmouth FC	28,993
18	Charlton Athletic FC	28,803
19	Burnley FC	28,151
20	Preston North End FC	27,888
21	Middlesbrough FC	27,002
22	Blackpool FC	25,416

=== Division Two ===
No.	Club	Average
1	Everton FC	45,922
2	Leicester City FC	28,982
3	Blackburn Rovers FC	26,123
4	Bristol Rovers FC	24,662
5	Fulham FC	22,606
6	Nottingham Forest FC	22,603
7	Birmingham City FC	22,353
8	Leeds United FC	21,810
9	Hull City AFC	20,995
10	West Ham United FC	20,090
11	Plymouth Argyle FC	19,649
12	Stoke City FC	18,009
13	Oldham Athletic FC	17,859
14	Derby County FC	17,284
15	Swansea City AFC	17,197
16	Doncaster Rovers FC	16,983
17	Notts County FC	16,237
18	Luton Town FC	15,997
19	Brentford FC	15,626
20	Lincoln City FC	14,712
21	Rotherham United FC	14,009
22	Bury FC	13,532

=== Division Three ===
No.	Club	Average
1	Brighton & Hove Albion FC	18,880
2	Norwich City FC	18,580
3	Bristol City FC	17,596
4	Port Vale FC	16,653
5	Ipswich Town FC	15,917
6	Southampton FC	14,885
7	Millwall FC	13,502
8	Crystal Palace FC	12,296
9	Watford FC	11,856
10	Reading FC	11,566
11	Leyton Orient FC	11,218
12	Queens Park Rangers FC	10,983
13	Swindon Town FC	10,753
14	Bradford City AFC	10,602
15	Coventry City FC	10,505
16	Gillingham FC	10,333
17	Northampton Town FC	10,289
18	AFC Bournemouth	9,727
19	Grimsby Town FC	9,578
20	Barnsley FC	9,512
21	Exeter City FC	9,344
22	Walsall FC	9,279
23	Wrexham AFC	9,232
24	Shrewsbury Town FC	9,188
25	Bradford Park Avenue AFC	9,134
26	Newport County AFC	8,922
27	Workington AFC	8,373
28	Scunthorpe United FC	8,246
29	Chesterfield FC	7,957
30	Colchester United FC	7,712
31	Stockport County FC	7,678
32	Mansfield Town FC	7,603
33	Hartlepool United FC	7,426
34	Southend United FC	7,372
35	Accrington Stanley FC	7,321
36	Torquay United FC	7,111
37	Carlisle United FC	6,955
38	Aldershot Town FC	6,645
39	Tranmere Rovers	6,212
40	Crewe Alexandra FC	6,148
41	Rochdale AFC	6,121
42	Gateshead AFC	5,899
43	York City FC	5,636
44	Barrow AFC	5,587
45	Halifax Town AFC	5,548
46	Chester City FC	5,503
47	Darlington FC	4,975
48	Southport FC	4,629

== See also ==
- 1953-54 in English football
