= Bernard Morrey =

English footballer

Personal information
- Full name: Bernard Joseph Morrey
- Date of birth: 8 April 1927
- Place of birth: Liverpool, England
- Date of death: 23 March 2011 (aged 83)
- Place of death: Huyton, England
- Position: Winger

Senior career*
Years	Team	Apps	(Gls)
19??–1952	Llandudno		
1952–1953	Newport County	22	(2)
1953–1955	Chester	30	(6)
- Ellesmere Port
Total		52	(8)
- * Club domestic league appearances and goals

Bernard Joseph Morrey (6 April 1927 – 23 March 2011) was an English footballer who played as a winger in the Football League for Newport County and Chester in the 1950s.

Morrey was the great-uncle of England international footballer Wayne Rooney.
