= Jim Collins (footballer, born 1923) =

English footballer

Personal information
- Full name: James Kenneth Collins
- Date of birth: 7 November 1923
- Place of birth: Colne, England
- Date of death: 27 March 1996 (aged 72)
- Place of death: Nottingham, England
- Position: Inside forward

Youth career
- Derby County

Senior career*
Years	Team	Apps	(Gls)
1947–1955	Barrow	295	(53)
1955–1957	Chester	48	(11)
- Winsford United
Total		343	(64)
- * Club domestic league appearances and goals

Jim Collins (1923–1996) was a footballer who played as an inside forward in the Football League for Barrow and Chester.
