= Ron Hughes (footballer, born 1930) =

Welsh footballer (1930–2019)

Personal information
- Full name: Ronald Hughes
- Date of birth: 1 July 1930
- Place of birth: Mold, Flintshire, Wales
- Date of death: 30 July 2019 (aged 89)
- Position: Defender

Senior career*
Years	Team	Apps	(Gls)
?–1950	Mold Alexandra		
1950–1962	Chester	399	(21)
1962–1963	Holywell Town		

Managerial career
- Mold Alexandra
- * Club domestic league appearances and goals

Ronald Hughes (1 July 1930 – 30 July 2019) was a Welsh professional footballer who played as a full-back. He spent his entire professional career with Chester from 1950 to 1962, where he made the second most Football League appearances in the club's history after featuring in 399 games.

== Playing career ==
Hughes joined Chester in September 1950 after completing his army service, having previously played for hometown club Mold Alexandra. His Football League debut arrived in March 1952 in a 5–0 win at Rochdale. Hughes went on to be a regular for the next decade, predominantly in the right-back spot. He didn't miss a first-team game between September 1956 and September 1958, and most other campaigns saw him miss very few games. As a reward for his loyalty, Hughes was awarded testimonial matches against Everton in 1957 and an All-Star XI in 1961.

Despite being a regular for so long, Hughes was released at the end of the 1961–62 season, his final appearance being a 2–0 loss at Carlisle United on the final day. His long-term defensive colleague Ray Gill was also allowed to leave, having made seven more league appearances for Chester than Hughes. They remain the two highest Football League appearance makers for Chester Club Records.

Hughes dropped back into non-league football with Holywell Town and had a spell back at Mold as manager in the 1970s. He later worked for the education department of Clwyd County Council.

== Sources ==
- Sumner, Chas (1997). On the Borderline: The Official History of Chester City F.C. 1885–1997. Yore Publications. ISBN 1-874427-52-6.
