= Charlie Jolley (footballer, born 1936) =

English footballer

Personal information
- Full name: Charles Jolley
- Date of birth: 3 March 1936
- Place of birth: Bebington, England
- Date of death: 2014 (aged 77–78)
- Place of death: Denbigh, Wales
- Position: Centre forward

Youth career
- Liverpool

Senior career*
Years	Team	Apps	(Gls)
1953–1955	Tranmere Rovers	6	(2)
1955–1956	Chester	7	(3)
- Oswestry Town
Total		13	(5)
- * Club domestic league appearances and goals

Charlie Jolley (3 March 1936 – March 2014) was an English footballer, who played as a centre forward in the Football League for Tranmere Rovers and Chester.
