= Sam Morris (footballer, born 1930) =

English footballer

Personal information
- Full name: Samuel Morris
- Date of birth: 12 February 1930
- Place of birth: Warrington, England
- Date of death: 20 December 2014 (aged 84)
- Place of death: Warrington, England
- Position: Wing half

Senior career*
| Years | Team | Apps | (Gls) |
| 1951–1957 | Chester | 90 | (0) |
- * Club domestic league appearances and goals

Sam Morris (12 February 1930 – 20 December 2014) was a British footballer who played as a wing half in the Football League for Chester.
