= Harry Smith (footballer, born 1930) =

English footballer (1930–2020)

Personal information
- Full name: Henry Stuart Smith
- Date of birth: 27 August 1930
- Place of birth: Chester, England
- Date of death: 22 April 2020 (aged 89)
- Place of death: Chester, England
- Position: Inside forward

Youth career
- 1944–1946: Chester
- 1946–1949: Liverpool

Senior career*
Years	Team	Apps	(Gls)
- Connah's Quay Nomads
????–1958	Chester	73	(7)
1958–????	Flint Town United		
- Pwllheli
- * Club domestic league appearances and goals

Henry Smith (27 August 1930 – 22 April 2020) was an English footballer who played as an inside forward. He made 73 appearances in The Football League for his local club of Chester in the 1950s.

== Playing career ==
Smith spent time on the books of Chester and Liverpool after leaving school and then had a spell with Connah's Quay Nomads after serving with the Royal Air Force. In the early 1950s he rejoined Chester, initially as an amateur and then as a part-time professional from 1955 as he combined playing with working as a milkman.

Smith made his league debut on the final day of 1952–53 against Barrow and went on to score seven times in his 73 league appearances in the next five years. His final league appearance came against Hartlepools United on 28 December 1957, after which he left the club to set up his own milk business. Smith dropped into non–league football with Flint Town United and then played for Pwllheli.

== Honours ==
Chester

- Welsh Cup runners–up: 1954–55 (played in final replay).
