= Billy Pye =

English footballer (1930–2010)

Personal information
- Full name: William Pye
- Date of birth: 8 November 1930
- Place of birth: Rainford, England
- Date of death: January 2010 (aged 79)
- Position: Inside forward

Senior career*
Years	Team	Apps	(Gls)
1953–1956	Chester	28	(11)
- * Club domestic league appearances and goals

William Pye (8 November 1930 – January 2010) was an English footballer, who played as an inside forward in the Football League for Chester.
