= Ken Brandon =

English footballer

Personal information
- Full name: Kenneth Alfred Brandon
- Date of birth: 8 February 1934
- Place of birth: Birmingham, England
- Date of death: May 1994 (aged 60)
- Place of death: Birmingham, England
- Position: Winger

Youth career
- Kingstanding Boys Club

Senior career*
Years	Team	Apps	(Gls)
1952–1953	Swindon Town	5	(0)
1953–1956	Chester	39	(7)
1956–1958	Leicester City	0	(0)
1958–1959	Darlington	16	(1)
1959–	Hinckley Athletic		
Total		60	(8)
- * Club domestic league appearances and goals

Kenneth Alfred Brandon (8 February 1934 – May 1994) was a footballer who played as a winger in the Football League for Swindon Town, Chester and Darlington.
