= Ray Gill =

English footballer

Personal information
- Full name: Raymond Gill
- Date of birth: 8 December 1924
- Place of birth: Manchester, England
- Date of death: 17 September 2001 (aged 76)
- Place of death: Rochdale, England
- Position: Full back

Senior career*
Years	Team	Apps	(Gls)
1947–1951	Manchester City	8	(0)
1951–1962	Chester	406	(3)
1962–1964	Hyde United	71	(0)
- * Club domestic league appearances and goals

Ray Gill (8 December 1924 – 17 September 2001) was an English footballer. He holds the Football League appearance record for Chester.

The full-back played in 406 league games for Chester from 1951 to 1962, putting him seven ahead of Ron Hughes (whose Chester career ran almost parallel to Gill's) and 10 ahead of Trevor Storton.

Gill had earlier played for hometown club Manchester City, where he made eight appearances. However, he was to enjoy a regular place at Chester for most of his time with the club. This was despite the fact he was part-time in his later years at the club as he worked as a salesman.

Gill was awarded testimonial matches by Chester in 1956 and 1962 against representative teams. He later played for Hyde United, Altrincham and Winsford United before moving into management with Radcliffe Borough between 1969 and 1973.
