= Frank Wayman =

English footballer

Personal information
- Date of birth: 30 December 1931
- Place of birth: Bishop Auckland, England
- Date of death: 7 February 2008 (aged 76)
- Place of death: Ferryhill, England
- Position: Winger

Senior career*
| Years | Team | Apps | (Gls) |
| 1953–1955 | Preston North End | 0 | (0) |
| 1955–1956 | Chester | 30 | (2) |
| 1957 | Darlington | 1 | (0) |
- * Club domestic league appearances and goals

Frank Wayman (30 December 1931 − 7 February 2008) was an English footballer. Born in Bishop Auckland, Wayman began his career in professional football as a winger with Preston North End in 1953, but never made any appearances for Preston's first team. In 1955, he joined Chester, where he spent one season, playing 30 league games. He finished his career at the professional level at Darlington, where he made a single appearance for the first-team. He later played for several non-league clubs in the North East.

Wayman died in February 2008, after being struck by a motorcycle as he crossed the A167 near Ferryhill. He died in hospital four days after the crash, having sustained serious head injuries. He was survived by his wife, two daughters, two granddaughters, two grandsons and two great-granddaughters.
