= Jack Haines =

English footballer

Personal information
- Full name: John Thomas William Haines
- Date of birth: 24 April 1920
- Place of birth: Wickhamford, England
- Date of death: 13 March 1987 (aged 66)
- Place of death: Worcester, England
- Height: 5 ft 9 in (1.75 m)
- Position: Inside forward

Youth career
- Cheltenham Town

Senior career*
Years	Team	Apps	(Gls)
1937–1946	Liverpool	0	(0)
- → Wrexham (war guest)
- → Doncaster Rovers (war guest)
- → Notts County (war guest)
- → Bradford Park Avenue (war guest)
- → Lincoln City (war guest)
1946–1947	Swansea Town	28	(7)
1947–1948	Leicester City	12	(3)
1948–1950	West Bromwich Albion	59	(23)
1950–1954	Bradford Park Avenue	136	(34)
1954–1955	Rochdale	60	(16)
1955–1956	Chester	47	(8)
- Wellington United
- Kidderminster Harriers
- Evesham United
Total		342	(91)

International career
1948	England	1	(2)
- * Club domestic league appearances and goals

John Thomas William Haines (24 April 1920 – 13 March 1987) was an English professional footballer who played as an inside forward. During his playing career, Haines made over 300 appearances in the Football League, and earned one cap for the England national side in 1948.

== Career ==
=== Club career ===
Born in Wickhamford, Haines played his early football for Evesham Town, Badsey Rangers, Charlton Kings and Cheltenham Town, before joining Liverpool in 1937. He never made a league appearance for Liverpool, and his playing career was interrupted in 1939 by World War II. When play resumed in 1946, Haines moved to Swansea Town, and later played for Leicester City, West Bromwich Albion, Bradford Park Avenue, Rochdale and Chester, before playing non-league football with Wellington United, Kidderminster Harriers and Evesham Town.

During the war, Haines guested for clubs including Wrexham, Doncaster Rovers, Notts County, Bradford Park Avenue and Lincoln City.

=== International career ===
Haines made his international debut for England on 2 December 1948 against Switzerland. He scored twice in a 6–0 victory but was never selected again.
