= Ken Fletcher (footballer, born 1931) =

English footballer (1931–2011)

Personal information
- Full name: Kenneth Fletcher
- Date of birth: 31 December 1931
- Place of birth: Liverpool, England
- Date of death: 13 October 2011 (aged 79)
- Place of death: New South Wales, Australia
- Position: Full back

Youth career
- Everton

Senior career*
| Years | Team | Apps | (Gls) |
| 1953–1956 | Chester | 34 | (0) |
- Prescot Cables
- * Club domestic league appearances and goals

Ken Fletcher (31 December 1931 – 13 October 2011) was an English footballer, who played as a full back in the Football League for Chester.
