= Bobby Jones (footballer, born 1933) =

English footballer

Personal information
- Full name: Robert William Jones
- Date of birth: 28 March 1933
- Place of birth: Liverpool, England
- Date of death: 1998 (aged 64–65)
- Position: Goalkeeper

Youth career
- Southport Boys Brigade

Senior career*
Years	Team	Apps	(Gls)
1951–1953	Southport	22	(0)
1953–1958	Chester	166	(0)
1958–1966	Blackburn Rovers	49	(0)
1966–1977	Great Harwood Town		

Managerial career
- Great Harwood Town
- * Club domestic league appearances and goals

Robert Jones (28 March 1933 – 1998) was an English professional footballer who played as a goalkeeper. He played in The Football League for Southport, Chester and Blackburn Rovers.

== Playing career ==
Jones played football as a youngster for the Meols Cop School team, the Southport town boys side and the Boys' Brigade. He then joined Football League side Southport, where his father was club trainer. In the summer of 1953 he moved to Chester, going on to be a league ever present in his first season at the club.

He remained a part-time player throughout his stay at Chester as he earned more in his work as a structural engineer. In March 1958 Jones moved to Blackburn Rovers for £3,000, going on to play top flight football over the next eight years.

Jones was released by Blackburn Rovers in 1966 and he dropped into non–league football with Great Harwood Town, where he would have spells as player, trainer and manager until 1977. Away from football he ran his own design business Jones Wilkinson Construction Services along with lifelong Friend Ken Wilkinson until retiring in 1985 on health grounds. He died in 1998.
