= 1948–49 Chester F.C. season =

Chester
1948–49 season
- Manager: Frank Brown
- Stadium: Sealand Road
- Football League Third Division North: 18th
- FA Cup: Second round
- Welsh Cup: Fifth round
- Top goalscorer: League: Cam Burgess and Bert Foulds (14); All: Cam Burgess and Bert Foulds (14)
- Highest home attendance: 13,509 vs Hull City (6 November)
- Lowest home attendance: 1,858 vs Barrow (4 May)
- Average home league attendance: 6,959; 19th in division
Home colours

The 1948–49 season was the eleventh season of competitive association football in the Football League played by Chester, an English club based in Chester, Cheshire.

It was the club's eleventh consecutive season in the Third Division North since the election to the Football League. Alongside competing in the league, the club also participated in the FA Cup and the Welsh Cup.

== Football League ==
Pos	Team	Pld	W	D	L	GF	GA	GAv	Pts
16	Hartlepools United	42	14	10	18	45	58	0.776	38
17	New Brighton	42	14	8	20	46	58	0.793	36
18	Chester	42	11	13	18	57	56	1.018	35
19	Halifax Town	42	12	11	19	45	62	0.726	35
20	Accrington Stanley	42	12	10	20	55	64	0.859	34

Source: rsssf.com

=== Results summary ===
Overall								Home						Away					
Pld	W	D	L	GF	GA	GAv	Pts	W	D	L	GF	GA	Pts	W	D	L	GF	GA	Pts
42	11	13	18	57	56	1.018	35	10	7	4	36	19	27	1	6	14	21	37	8

Source: rsssf.com

=== Results by matchday ===
Round	1	2	3	4	5	6	7	8	9	10	11	12	13	14	15	16	17	18	19	20	21	22	23	24	25	26	27	28	29	30	31	32	33	34	35	36	37	38	39	40	41	42
Result	L	W	D	D	L	W	L	L	L	W	L	D	L	W	L	L	D	W	W	W	L	D	L	L	D	D	W	W	D	D	D	D	L	D	L	L	W	L	L	L	D	W
Position	15	7	9	7	12	7	12	14	18	16	17	16	17	17	19	19	19	17	15	15	15	13	16	16	15	16	15	13	13	13	13	13	17	16	17	17	17	17	17	19	20	18

Source: statto.com
W = Win; D = Draw; L = Loss

=== Matches ===
Date	Opponents	Venue	Result	Score	Scorers	Attendance
21 August	Carlisle United	A	L	1–2	Seed (o.g.)	11,941
25 August	Stockport County	H	W	2–0	Foulkes, Best	7,644
28 August	Gateshead	H	D	1–1	Foulds	8,734
1 September	Stockport County	A	D	1–1	Best	11,707
4 September	Hartlepools United	A	L	1–2	Best	9,181
8 September	York City	H	W	4–1	Astbury (2), Davies, Foulds	6,818
11 September	Darlington	H	L	1–2	Foulds	8,880
13 September	York City	A	L	0–2		9,511
18 September	Rochdale	A	L	1–3	Best	11,965
25 September	New Brighton	H	W	2–0	Coffin (2)	8,546
2 October	Mansfield Town	A	L	0–1		12,459
9 October	Tranmere Rovers	H	D	2–2	Astbury, Westwood	8,295
16 October	Oldham Athletic	A	L	1–2	Foulds	15,440
23 October	Accrington Stanley	H	W	3–0	Burgess (2), Harrigan	7,558
30 October	Rotherham United	A	L	1–2	Harrigan	15,080
6 November	Hull City	H	L	0–2		13,509
13 November	Doncaster Rovers	A	D	0–0		10,658
20 November	Bradford City	H	W	3–0	Burgess, Harrigan, Foulds	5,954
4 December	Wrexham	H	W	2–0	Burgess (2)	11,909
18 December	Carlisle United	H	W	2–1	Burgess (2, 1pen.)	4,628
25 December	Crewe Alexandra	A	L	0–1		8,587
27 December	Crewe Alexandra	H	D	1–1	Lee	7,380
1 January	Gateshead	A	L	1–2	Burgess	8,720
8 January	Wrexham	A	L	0–1		11,947
15 January	Hartlepools United	H	D	0–0		3,215
22 January	Darlington	A	D	3–3	Davies, Foulds, Westwood	7,505
29 January	Halifax Town	A	W	2–1	Westwood, Foulds	9,160
5 February	Rochdale	H	W	2–1	Foulds (2)	5,570
12 February	Barrow	A	D	1–1	Burgess	5,887
19 February	New Brighton	A	D	1–1	Foulds	8,672
26 February	Mansfield Town	H	D	1–1	Foulds	5,250
12 March	Oldham Athletic	H	D	2–2	Foulds, Westwood	6,642
19 March	Accrington Stanley	A	L	1–3	McNeil	4,767
26 March	Rotherham United	H	D	1–1	Burgess	6,431
2 April	Hull City	A	L	2–3	Davies, Burgess	36,167
9 April	Doncaster Rovers	H	L	1–2	Foulds	6,220
15 April	Southport	H	W	2–0	Forsyth, Burgess	7,237
16 April	Bradford City	A	L	2–3	Davies, Foulds	12,220
18 April	Southport	A	L	1–2	Davies	8,706
23 April	Halifax Town	H	L	0–1		3,858
2 May	Tranmere Rovers	A	D	1–1	Williamson	6,420
4 May	Barrow	H	W	4–1	Westwood, Burgess (2), Harrigan	1,858

== FA Cup ==
Round	Date	Opponents	Venue	Result	Score	Scorers	Attendance
First round	27 November	Hartlepools United (3N)	A	W	3–1	Williamson, Harrigan, Forsyth	8,563
Second round	11 December	Aldershot (3S)	A	L	0–1		10,000

== Welsh Cup ==
Round	Date	Opponents	Venue	Result	Score	Scorers	Attendance
Fifth round	12 January	Wrexham (3N)	A	W	0–6		3,790

== Season statistics ==
Nat	Player	Total		League		FA Cup		Welsh Cup	
Nat	Player	A	G	A	G	A	G	A	G
Goalkeepers
	Ted Elliott	17	–	14	–	2	–	1	–
	George Scales	21	–	21	–	–	–	–	–
	Jimmy MacLaren	7	–	7	–	–	–	–	–
Field players
(Wales)	Tommy Astbury	43	3	40	3	2	–	1	–
(England)	Alan Beaumont	5	–	5	–	–	–	–	–
(Wales)	Tommy Best	10	4	10	4	–	–	–	–
(England)	Grenville Booth	8	–	8	–	–	–	–	–
(Wales)	Ernie Bryan	1	–	1	–	–	–	–	–
(England)	Cam Burgess	32	14	29	14	2	–	1	–
	Reg Butcher	43	–	40	–	2	–	1	–
	Geoff Coffin	3	2	3	2	–	–	–	–
(England)	Joe Davies	24	5	23	5	–	–	1	–
(Scotland)	John Forsyth	34	2	32	1	2	1	–	–
	Bert Foulds	33	14	31	14	2	–	–	–
(Wales)	Billy Foulkes	28	1	25	1	2	–	1	–
	Peter Greenwood	2	–	2	–	–	–	–	–
	Duncan Harrigan	23	5	20	4	2	1	1	–
	Bill Hounslea	1	–	1	–	–	–	–	–
	Roger Kirkpatrick	1	–	1	–	–	–	–	–
(England)	Eric Lee	32	1	29	1	2	–	1	–
(Scotland)	Tom Mackie	7	–	5	–	2	–	–	–
	Cliff Mansley	23	–	22	–	–	–	1	–
	Dave McNeil	35	1	35	1	–	–	–	–
(England)	Tommy Tilston	1	–	–	–	–	–	1	–
	Trevor Walters	1	–	1	–	–	–	–	–
(England)	Raymond Westwood	22	5	22	5	–	–	–	–
(England)	George Williamson	38	2	35	1	2	1	1	–
	Own goals	–	1	–	1	–	–	–	–
	Total	45	60	42	57	2	3	1	–
