= 1949–50 Chester F.C. season =

Chester
1949–50 season
- Manager: Frank Brown
- Stadium: Sealand Road
- Football League Third Division North: 12th
- FA Cup: Second round
- Welsh Cup: Semifinal
- Top goalscorer: League: Cam Burgess (24); All: Cam Burgess (27)
- Highest home attendance: 14,034 vs Wrexham (8 October)
- Lowest home attendance: 2,215 vs Mansfield Town (29 April)
- Average home league attendance: 6,695; 19th in division
Home colours

The 1949–50 season was the twelfth season of competitive association football in the Football League played by Chester, an English club based in Chester, Cheshire.

It was the club's twelfth consecutive season in the Third Division North since its election to the Football League. Alongside competing in the league, the club also participated in the FA Cup and the Welsh Cup.

== Football League ==
Pos	Team	Pld	W	D	L	GF	GA	GAv	Pts
10	Stockport County	42	19	7	16	55	52	1.058	45
11	Oldham Athletic	42	16	11	15	58	63	0.921	43
12	Chester	42	17	6	19	70	79	0.886	40
13	Accrington Stanley	42	16	7	19	57	62	0.919	39
14	New Brighton	42	14	10	18	45	63	0.714	38

Source: rsssf.com

=== Results summary ===
Overall								Home						Away					
Pld	W	D	L	GF	GA	GAv	Pts	W	D	L	GF	GA	Pts	W	D	L	GF	GA	Pts
42	17	6	19	70	79	0.886	40	12	3	6	47	33	27	5	3	13	23	46	13

Source: rsssf.com

=== Results by matchday ===
Round	1	2	3	4	5	6	7	8	9	10	11	12	13	14	15	16	17	18	19	20	21	22	23	24	25	26	27	28	29	30	31	32	33	34	35	36	37	38	39	40	41	42
Result	L	D	L	W	L	W	L	L	L	L	D	W	W	W	L	L	L	L	W	L	L	W	W	L	L	W	D	W	W	L	L	W	W	D	W	W	W	D	L	D	L	W
Position	20	14	20	16	19	15	18	20	21	21	20	18	15	13	15	15	17	21	17	20	20	19	15	17	20	18	19	16	14	18	18	18	16	16	14	13	11	12	13	12	13	12

Source: statto.com
W = Win; D = Draw; L = Loss

=== Matches ===
Date	Opponents	Venue	Result	Score	Scorers	Attendance
20 August	Stockport County	H	L	0–4		10,026
22 August	Southport	A	D	1–1	Jackson (pen.)	9,133
27 August	Doncaster Rovers	A	L	0–2		16,945
31 August	Southport	H	W	4–1	Jackson (2), Jones, Burgess	5,548
3 September	Gateshead	H	L	0–3		7,695
5 September	Rochdale	A	W	1–0	Tilston	7,543
10 September	Hartlepools United	A	L	1–5	Coffin	9,341
14 September	Rochdale	H	L	0–2		5,165
17 September	Darlington	A	L	1–2	Coffin	8,577
19 September	Rotherham United	A	L	2–3	Burgess (2)	8,421
24 September	New Brighton	A	D	3–3	Jackson (2, 1pen.), Burgess	6,417
1 October	Halifax Town	H	W	5–1	Burgess (4), Davies	5,451
8 October	Wrexham	H	W	2–1	Burgess, Jackson	14,034
15 October	Oldham Athletic	A	W	2–0	Coffin, Burgess	16,467
22 October	York City	H	L	2–3	Burgess, Astbury	6,370
29 October	Tranmere Rovers	A	L	1–2	Jackson	13,020
5 November	Crewe Alexandra	H	L	0–1		10,684
12 November	Barrow	A	L	1–3	Kirkpatrick	3,482
19 November	Lincoln City	H	W	3–1	Davies, Burgess, Jackson (pen.)	5,312
3 December	Carlisle United	H	L	2–4	Pearson, Davies	4,494
17 December	Stockport County	A	L	0–3		8,413
24 December	Doncaster Rovers	H	W	3–1	Foulkes (2), Pearson	6,763
26 December	Bradford City	H	W	4–1	Foulkes, Astbury (2), Pearson	8,717
27 December	Bradford City	A	L	0–1		21,246
31 December	Gateshead	A	L	0–4		6,542
14 January	Hartlepools United	H	W	3–0	Foulkes, Astbury, Jackson (pen.)	5,138
21 January	Darlington	H	D	4–4	Davison (o.g.), Kirkpatrick, Jackson (pen.), Burgess	5,004
4 February	New Brighton	H	W	2–0	Burgess, Coffin	5,953
11 February	Mansfield Town	A	W	2–0	Kirkpatrick, Coffin	9,630
18 February	Halifax Town	A	L	1–2	Burgess	6,009
25 February	Lincoln City	A	L	0–2		8,634
4 March	Rotherham United	H	W	4–2	Kirkpatrick, Burgess (2), Coffin	6,533
11 March	York City	A	W	3–2	Astbury, Burgess (2)	5,986
18 March	Tranmere Rovers	H	D	0–0		6,528
25 March	Crewe Alexandra	A	W	2–1	Burgess (2)	8,399
1 April	Barrow	H	W	1–0	Burgess	5,004
7 April	Accrington Stanley	H	W	1–0	Coffin	8,388
8 April	Wrexham	A	D	1–1	Coffin	8,932
10 April	Accrington Stanley	A	L	0–4		4,611
15 April	Oldham Athletic	H	D	1–1	Kirkpatrick	5,578
22 April	Carlisle United	A	L	1–5	Burgess	9,559
29 April	Mansfield Town	H	W	6–3	Kirkpatrick, Coffin, Tilston (3), Burgess	2,215

== FA Cup ==
Round	Date	Opponents	Venue	Result	Score	Scorers	Attendance
First round	26 November	Goole Town (MFL)	H	W	4–1	Jackson (3), Burgess	6,774
Second round	10 December	Exeter City (3S)	A	L	0–2		11,025

== Welsh Cup ==
Round	Date	Opponents	Venue	Result	Score	Scorers	Attendance
Fifth round	11 January	South Liverpool (CCL)	A	D	0–0		1,200
Fifth round replay	25 January	South Liverpool (CCL)	H	D	2–2	Jackson, Pearson	
Fifth round replay	15 February	South Liverpool (CCL)	H	W	2–0	Greenwood, Burgess (pen.)	2,000
Quarterfinal	1 March	Barry Town (SFL)	H	W	3–2	Coffin (2), Burgess	
Semifinal	29 March	Wrexham (3N)	A	D	0–0		7,041
Semifinal replay	17 April	Wrexham (3N)	H	D	1–5	Williamson	

== Season statistics ==
Nat	Player	Total		League		FA Cup		Welsh Cup	
Nat	Player	A	G	A	G	A	G	A	G
Goalkeepers
	Ted Elliott	48	–	42	–	2	–	4	–
	Harry Threadgold	2	–	–	–	–	–	2	–
Field players
(Wales)	Tommy Astbury	48	5	40	5	2	–	6	–
(England)	Grenville Booth	1	–	–	–	1	–	–	–
(England)	Cam Burgess	42	27	34	24	2	1	6	2
	Reg Butcher	22	–	20	–	–	–	2	–
	Geoff Coffin	33	11	29	9	–	–	4	2
(Wales)	Jim Cole	1	–	1	–	–	–	–	–
(England)	Joe Davies	25	3	23	3	2	–	–	–
(Wales)	Billy Foulkes	45	4	37	4	2	–	6	–
	Peter Greenwood	25	1	19	–	–	–	6	1
	Frank Hindle	48	–	40	–	2	–	6	–
	Harry Jackson	24	14	21	10	2	3	1	1
	Ernie Jones	6	1	5	1	–	–	1	–
	Roger Kirkpatrick	38	6	36	6	1	–	1	–
	Bill Lawton	1	–	–	–	–	–	1	–
(England)	Eric Lee	40	–	33	–	1	–	6	–
	Dave McNeil	6	–	4	–	2	–	–	–
	John Molyneux	40	–	32	–	2	–	6	–
	Billy Pearson	16	4	12	3	1	–	3	1
	Harry Richardson	1	–	–	–	–	–	1	–
	Eric Sibley	7	–	7	–	–	–	–	–
(England)	Tommy Tilston	11	4	10	4	–	–	1	–
(England)	George Williamson	20	1	17	–	–	–	3	1
	Own goals	–	1	–	1	–	–	–	–
	Total	50	82	42	70	2	4	6	8
