= 1950–51 Chester F.C. season =

Chester
1950–51 season
- Manager: Frank Brown
- Stadium: Sealand Road
- Football League Third Division North: 13th
- FA Cup: First round
- Welsh Cup: Quarterfinal
- Top goalscorer: League: Cam Burgess (22); All: Cam Burgess (25)
- Highest home attendance: 11,280 vs Wrexham (6 September)
- Lowest home attendance: 2,896 vs Stockport County (4 April)
- Average home league attendance: 5,951; 19th in division
Home colours

The 1950–51 season was the 13th season of competitive association football in the Football League played by Chester, an English club based in Chester, Cheshire.

It was the club's 13th consecutive season in the Third Division North since the election to the Football League. Alongside competing in the league, the club also participated in the FA Cup and the Welsh Cup.

== Football League ==
Pos	Team	Pld	HW	HD	HL	HGF	HGA	AW	AD	AL	AGF	AGA	GAv	Pts
11	Rochdale	46	11	6	6	38	18	6	5	12	31	44	1.113	45
12	Scunthorpe & Lindsey United (Note: New club in the league; elected from Midland League)	46	10	12	1	32	9	3	6	14	26	48	1.018	44
13	Chester	46	11	6	6	42	30	6	3	14	20	34	0.969	43
14	Wrexham	46	12	6	5	37	28	3	6	14	18	43	0.775	42
15	Oldham Athletic	46	10	5	8	47	36	6	3	14	26	37	1.000	40

Source: rsssf.com

=== Results summary ===
Overall								Home						Away					
Pld	W	D	L	GF	GA	GAv	Pts	W	D	L	GF	GA	Pts	W	D	L	GF	GA	Pts
46	17	9	20	62	64	0.969	43	11	6	6	42	30	28	6	3	14	20	34	15

Source: rsssf.com

=== Results by matchday ===
Round	1	2	3	4	5	6	7	8	9	10	11	12	13	14	15	16	17	18	19	20	21	22	23	24	25	26	27	28	29	30	31	32	33	34	35	36	37	38	39	40	41	42	43	44	45	46
Result	L	W	W	L	W	D	W	L	W	D	L	D	D	L	W	W	L	L	L	L	D	W	L	L	W	W	L	L	W	D	L	W	W	D	L	L	W	L	W	L	D	L	W	W	L	D
Position	16	12	9	10	6	8	7	8	6	8	10	11	9	10	10	9	12	12	12	12	12	12	13	15	12	12	13	14	11	12	14	12	12	12	15	16	15	16	13	14	13	13	13	12	13	13

Source: statto.com
W = Win; D = Draw; L = Loss

=== Matches ===
Date	Opponents	Venue	Result	Score	Scorers	Attendance
19 August	Lincoln City	A	L	1–2	Foulkes	10,793
23 August	Oldham Athletic	H	W	3–1	Devonshire, Foulkes, Kirkpatrick (pen.)	6,720
26 August	Darlington	H	W	3–1	Morement (2), Burgess	7,510
29 August	Oldham Athletic	A	L	0–1		11,694
17 December	Stockport County	A	W	3–0	Foulkes, Burgess (2)	10,834
6 September	Wrexham	H	D	0–0		11,280
9 September	Halifax Town	H	W	2–1	Burgess, Morement	7,720
13 September	Wrexham	A	L	0–2		16,710
16 September	Hartlepools United	A	W	2–1	Kirkpatrick (2)	8,773
23 September	Gateshead	H	D	2–2	Morement, Burgess	10,363
30 September	Crewe Alexandra	A	L	0–3		10,178
7 October	Carlisle United	H	D	1–1	Burgess	7,671
14 October	York City	A	D	2–2	Devonshire, Astbury	8,852
21 October	Southport	H	L	0–2		7,114
28 October	Accrington Stanley	A	W	2–1	Burgess (2)	5,744
4 November	Bradford Park Avenue	H	W	2–0	Astbury, Coffin	7,362
11 November	Tranmere Rovers	A	L	1–3	Devonshire	14,343
18 November	Barrow	H	L	1–2	Morement	5,200
2 December	Mansfield Town	H	L	0–1		3,963
9 December	Scunthorpe & Lindsey United	A	L	0–2		7,989
23 December	Darlington	A	D	0–0		3,570
25 December	Shrewsbury Town	H	W	3–1	Foulkes, Tilston (2)	5,544
26 December	Shrewsbury Town	A	L	0–1		10,857
13 January	Halifax Town	A	L	1–3	Hankinson	5,421
16 January	Rochdale	A	W	3–2	Burgess (2), Devonshire	1,435
20 January	Hartlepools United	H	W	2–1	Tilston, Burgess	4,809
27 January	Rochdale	H	L	1–3	Astbury	4,534
3 February	Gateshead	A	L	1–2	Coffin	4,804
10 February	Bradford City	A	W	1–0	Coffin	9,444
17 February	Crewe Alexandra	H	D	1–1	Coffin	6,178
24 February	Carlisle United	A	L	1–2	Burgess	11,012
3 March	York City	H	W	3–1	Coffin (2), Burgess	4,828
10 March	Southport	A	W	1–0	Burgess	3,997
17 March	Accrington Stanley	H	D	2–2	Burgess, Foulkes	3,400
24 March	Bradford Park Avenue	A	L	0–2		11,679
31 March	Tranmere Rovers	H	L	1–3	Kirkpatrick	5,730
4 April	Stockport County	H	W	3–0	Morement (3, 1pen.)	2,896
7 April	Barrow	A	L	0–2		4,289
11 April	Lincoln City	H	W	2–1	Kirkpatrick, Morement (pen.)	4,730
14 April	Rotherham United	H	L	1–2	Burgess	7,760
16 April	Rotherham United	A	D	0–0		18,481
21 April	Mansfield Town	A	L	1–2	Burgess	10,239
25 April	New Brighton	H	W	3–1	Kirkpatrick, Burgess, Morement	3,535
28 April	Scunthorpe & Lindsey United	H	W	4–1	Burgess (3), Morement (pen.)	3,778
2 May	New Brighton	A	L	0–1		2,421
5 May	Bradford City	H	D	2–2	Burgess, Hilton	4,247

== FA Cup ==
Round	Date	Opponents	Venue	Result	Score	Scorers	Attendance
First round	25 November	Bradford Park Avenue (3N)	H	L	1–2	Coffin	8,255

== Welsh Cup ==
Round	Date	Opponents	Venue	Result	Score	Scorers	Attendance
Fifth round	6 January	Rhyl (CCL)	H	W	2–1	Burgess (2)	4,000
Quarterfinal	1 March	Merthyr Tydfil (SFL)	A	L	2–5	Devonshire, Burgess	12,000

== Season statistics ==
Nat	Player	Total		League		FA Cup		Welsh Cup	
Nat	Player	A	G	A	G	A	G	A	G
Goalkeepers
	Ted Elliott	3	–	3	–	–	–	–	–
	Harry Threadgold	46	–	43	–	1	–	2	–
Field players
(Wales)	Tommy Astbury	47	3	44	3	1	–	2	–
(England)	Cam Burgess	44	25	41	22	1	–	2	3
	Geoff Coffin	20	7	18	6	1	1	1	–
(England)	Les Devonshire	47	5	44	4	1	–	2	1
(Wales)	Billy Foulkes	46	5	43	5	1	–	2	–
	Peter Greenwood	31	–	29	–	1	–	1	–
	Jim Hankinson	16	1	15	1	1	–	–	–
	Joe Hilton	3	1	3	1	–	–	–	–
	Frank Hindle	44	–	41	–	1	–	2	–
	Ernie Jones	1	–	1	–	–	–	–	–
	Roger Kirkpatrick	36	6	35	6	–	–	1	–
(England)	Eric Lee	45	–	42	–	1	–	2	–
	Dave McNeil	6	–	6	–	–	–	–	–
	John Molyneux	47	–	44	–	1	–	2	–
	Ralph Morement	41	11	39	11	–	–	2	–
(England)	Tommy Tilston	13	3	12	3	–	–	1	–
	Phil Whitlock	3	–	3	–	–	–	–	–
	Own goals	–	–	–	–	–	–	–	–
	Total	49	67	46	62	1	1	2	4
