= 1951–52 Chester F.C. season =

Chester
1951–52 season
- Manager: Frank Brown
- Stadium: Sealand Road
- Football League Third Division North: 19th
- FA Cup: Third round
- Welsh Cup: Quarterfinal
- Top goalscorer: League: Roger Kirkpatrick (10); All: James Fletcher (12)
- Highest home attendance: 14,244 vs Wrexham (18 August)
- Lowest home attendance: 2,316 vs Southport (3 May)
- Average home league attendance: 6,146; 19th in division
Home colours

The 1951–52 season was the 14th season of competitive association football in the Football League played by Chester, an English club based in Chester, Cheshire.

It was the club's 14th consecutive season in the Third Division North since the election to the Football League. Alongside competing in the league, the club also participated in the FA Cup and the Welsh Cup.

== Football League ==
Pos	Team	Pld	W	D	L	GF	GA	GAv	Pts
17	Southport	46	15	11	20	53	71	0.746	41
18	Wrexham	46	15	9	22	63	73	0.863	39
19	Chester	46	15	9	22	72	85	0.847	39
20	Halifax Town	46	14	7	25	61	97	0.629	35
21	Rochdale	46	11	13	22	47	79	0.595	35

Source: rsssf.com

=== Results summary ===
Overall								Home						Away					
Pld	W	D	L	GF	GA	GAv	Pts	W	D	L	GF	GA	Pts	W	D	L	GF	GA	Pts
46	15	9	22	72	85	0.847	39	13	4	6	46	30	30	2	5	16	26	55	9

Source: rsssf.com

=== Results by matchday ===
Round	1	2	3	4	5	6	7	8	9	10	11	12	13	14	15	16	17	18	19	20	21	22	23	24	25	26	27	28	29	30	31	32	33	34	35	36	37	38	39	40	41	42	43	44	45	46
Result	W	W	L	D	W	W	L	L	L	D	L	L	L	W	L	W	L	W	D	L	L	L	L	W	L	D	L	L	L	L	W	W	L	L	W	W	D	W	D	W	D	W	D	D	L	L
Position	10	1	9	9	4	1	6	6	10	11	11	15	19	15	18	15	17	16	15	16	18	18	21	18	20	20	21	21	21	21	20	20	20	20	20	19	19	19	19	19	18	17	16	16	17	19

Source: statto.com
W = Win; D = Draw; L = Loss

=== Matches ===
Date	Opponents	Venue	Result	Score	Scorers	Attendance
18 August	Wrexham	H	W	2–1	Gill, Burgess	14,244
22 August	Scunthorpe & Lindsey United	H	W	3–1	Burgess (2), Hilton	7,045
25 August	York City	A	L	2–4	Hilton, Simpson (o.g.)	8,095
30 August	Scunthorpe & Lindsey United	A	D	2–2	Fletcher, Davies	6,042
1 September	Bradford City	H	W	1–0	Burgess	7,528
5 September	Tranmere Rovers	H	W	4–1	Foulkes (3), Fletcher	8,052
8 September	Hartlepools United	A	L	1–2	Foulkes	11,053
11 September	Tranmere Rovers	A	L	1–3	Hilton	11,344
15 September	Oldham Athletic	H	L	1–2	Fletcher	10,234
22 September	Darlington	A	D	1–1	Fletcher	5,306
26 September	Wrexham	A	L	2–3	Fletcher, Kirkpatrick	12,213
29 September	Gateshead	H	L	0–3		8,072
6 October	Bradford Park Avenue	A	L	0–3		11,795
13 October	Halifax Town	H	W	5–1	Kirkpatrick (2), Morement (2), Jones	4,569
20 October	Mansfield Town	A	L	1–3	Windle	9,550
27 October	Rochdale	H	W	4–0	Astbury, Fletcher, Kirkpatrick (2)	4,628
3 November	Accrington Stanley	A	L	2–4	Coffin, Jones	5,712
10 November	Carlisle United	H	W	4–2	Fletcher, Coffin, Jones, Twentyman (o.g.)	6,082
17 November	Stockport County	A	D	0–0		11,822
1 December	Barrow	A	L	0–1		6,143
8 December	Grimsby Town	H	L	0–3		4,955
22 December	York City	H	L	0–1		2,998
25 December	Chesterfield	A	L	0–2		10,032
26 December	Chesterfield	H	W	3–0	Coffin (2), Fletcher (pen.)	7,262
29 December	Bradford City	A	L	0–1		10,992
5 January	Hartlepools United	H	D	3–3	Greenwood, Fletcher (pen.), Windle	4,902
19 January	Oldham Athletic	A	L	2–11	Morement (pen.), Jones	13,458
23 January	Lincoln City	A	L	1–4	Greenwood	7,682
2 February	Lincoln City	H	L	0–1		5,537
9 February	Gateshead	A	L	0–1		5,416
16 February	Bradford Park Avenue	H	W	4–2	Kirkpatrick (2), Travis, Windle	5,691
23 February	Southport	H	W	2–1	Travis (2)	6,600
1 March	Halifax Town	A	L	1–4	Windle	6,922
8 March	Mansfield Town	H	L	1–5	Travis	5,133
15 March	Rochdale	A	W	5–0	Travis (2), Nelson Stiffle, Astbury, Kirkpatrick	4,561
22 March	Accrington Stanley	H	W	3–1	Stiffle, Windle, Travis	4,533
29 March	Carlisle United	A	D	0–0		4,351
2 April	Darlington	H	W	2–0	Greenwood, Travis	2,590
4 April	Stockport County	H	D	0–0		5,606
11 April	Crewe Alexandra	A	W	2–1	Richardson, Kirkpatrick	8,886
12 April	Workington	A	D	2–2	Coffin, Astbury	5,584
14 April	Crewe Alexandra	H	W	2–0	Spink, Kirkpatrick	7,013
19 April	Barrow	H	D	0–0		4,767
23 April	Workington	H	D	2–2	Richardson, Windle	3,317
26 April	Grimsby Town	A	L	1–2	Travis	12,434
3 May	Southport	A	L	0–1		2,316

== FA Cup ==
Round	Date	Opponents	Venue	Result	Score	Scorers	Attendance
First round	24 November	Accrington Stanley (3N)	A	W	2–1	Fletcher, Kirkpatrick	8,312
Second round	15 December	Leyton Orient (3S)	H	W	5–2	Astbury, Jones, Morement	6,453
Third round	12 January	Chelsea (1)	A	D	2–2	Coffin, Greenwood	42,954
Third round replay	16 January	Chelsea (1)	H	L	2–3 (a.e.t.)	Willense (o.g.), Coffin	20,378

== Welsh Cup ==
Round	Date	Opponents	Venue	Result	Score	Scorers	Attendance
Fifth round	2 January	Bangor City (CCL)	H	W	3–1	Fletcher (2), R. Evans (o.g.)	1,500
Quarterfinal	6 February	Wrexham (3N)	A	D	0–0		7,434
Quarterfinal replay	20 February	Wrexham (3N)	A	W	0–2		4,178

== Season statistics ==
Nat	Player	Total		League		FA Cup		Welsh Cup	
Nat	Player	A	G	A	G	A	G	A	G
Goalkeepers
	Bernard Port	6	–	6	–	–	–	–	–
	Harry Threadgold	47	–	40	–	4	–	3	–
Field players
(Wales)	Tommy Astbury	47	4	43	3	3	1	1	–
(England)	Cam Burgess	7	4	7	4	–	–	–	–
	Geoff Coffin	28	7	25	5	3	2	–	–
(England)	Joe Davies	6	1	6	1	–	–	–	–
(Scotland)	Joe Feeney	5	–	5	–	–	–	–	–
(England)	James Fletcher	28	12	23	9	4	1	1	2
(Wales)	Billy Foulkes	13	4	13	4	–	–	–	–
(England)	Ray Gill	47	1	42	1	2	–	3	–
	Peter Greenwood	19	4	12	3	4	1	3	–
	Joe Hilton	11	3	10	3	1	–	–	–
(Wales)	Ron Hughes	6	–	6	–	–	–	–	–
	Bill Jones	34	5	29	4	2	1	3	–
	Roger Kirkpatrick	28	11	27	10	1	1	–	–
(England)	Eric Lee	40	–	33	–	4	–	3	–
	John Molyneux	43	–	36	–	4	–	3	–
	Ralph Morement	51	4	44	3	4	1	3	–
	Sam Morris	18	–	13	–	2	–	3	–
	Fred Richardson	7	2	7	2	–	–	–	–
	Gerry Smyth	2	–	2	–	–	–	–	–
(England)	Tony Spink	5	1	5	1	–	–	–	–
	Nelson Stiffle	10	2	7	2	–	–	3	–
	Don Travis	15	9	15	9	–	–	–	–
	Phil Whitlock	16	–	13	–	2	–	1	–
(England)	Bobby Williams	1	–	1	–	–	–	–	–
	Billy Windle	41	6	34	6	4	–	3	–
(England)	John Yates	2	–	2	–	–	–	–	–
	Own goals	–	6	–	2	–	3	–	1
	Total	53	86	46	72	4	11	3	3
