= James Cole =

James, Jim, or Jimmy Cole may refer to:

== Politics ==
- James Cole (politician) (1808–1861), architect and politician in the colony of South Australia
- James Cole Mountflorence (died 1820), born James Cole, American businessman and diplomat
- James D. Cole (born 1937), American politician, Texas House of Representatives
- James Cole Jr., official in the United States Department of Education
- James Cole (Oregon politician), see list of members of the Oregon Territorial Legislature#1857
- James L. Cole (c. 1814–1883), justice of the Louisiana Supreme Court

== Sports ==
- Jim Cole (footballer) (1925–1997), Welsh footballer
- Jim Cole (ice hockey) (born 1951), Canadian former professional ice hockey player
- Jim Cole (American football) (born 1952), American football coach
- Jimmy Cole (American football) (1931/1932–2022), American football player and official
- James Cole (racing driver) (born 1988), British racing driver
- Chris Cole (skateboarder) (James Chris Cole), American skateboarder

== Characters ==
- James Cole, a character in the film 12 Monkeys, and the subsequent TV series
- James Cole, a character in the TV series Lie to Me, played by Jake Thomas

== Other ==
- James Kelly Cole (1885–1909), poet and Industrial Workers of the World member
- James M. Cole (born 1952), former U.S. deputy attorney general
- James W. "Catfish" Cole (1924–1967), grand dragon of the Ku Klux Klan of North Carolina and South Carolina
- James Cole, musician in Europeans and Brazil
- James Cole, namesake of Cole's Hill

== See also ==
- Cole (name)
- James Cole Elementary School
