= Francis Ramsay =

Francis Ramsay may refer to:

- Francis Dennis Ramsay (1925–2009), Scottish portrait painter
- Francis Munroe Ramsay (1835–1914), U.S. Navy officer
- Francis Ramsay (cricketer) (1860–1947), English cricketer and pastoralist in Queensland
