= James Fletcher =

James Fletcher may refer to:

== Politicians ==
- James Fletcher (English politician), MP for Cambridge
- James Fletcher (Australian politician) (1834–1891), Australian coalminer and owner, newspaper proprietor and politician
- James H. Fletcher (1835–1917), Lieutenant Governor of South Dakota

== Other ==
- James Cooley Fletcher (1823–1901), American Presbyterian minister and missionary
- James Fletcher (entomologist) (1852–1908), Canadian entomologist, botanist and writer
- J. M. J. Fletcher (1852–1934), English historian
- James Fletcher (industrialist) (1886–1974), New Zealand businessman and industrialist
- James Fletcher Jnr (1914–2007), his son, New Zealand businessman and industrialist
- James C. Fletcher (1919–1991), NASA administrator
- James Fletcher (footballer) (1926–2014), English footballer active in the 1950s

== See also ==
- Jamie "Fletch" Fletcher, character in the soap opera Hollyoaks
- Jaime Fletcher, founder of IslamInSpanish
- Jim Fletcher, a fictional character in Prisoner
- Jim Fletcher, American actor (born 1963)
- James Fletcher Epes, U.S. representative from Virginia
