= 1950–51 Welsh Cup =

Tournament details
- Country: Wales

Final positions
- Champions: (Wales) Merthyr Tydfil
- Runners-up: (Wales) Cardiff City

The 1950–51 FAW Welsh Cup is the 64th season of the annual knockout tournament for competitive football teams in Wales.

== Key ==
League name pointed after clubs name.

- CCL - Cheshire County League
- FL D2 - Football League Second Division
- FL D3N - Football League Third Division North
- FL D3S - Football League Third Division South
- SFL - Southern Football League

== Fifth round ==
Eight winners from the Fourth round and six new clubs.

Tie no	Home	Score	Away
1	Chester (FL D3N)	2–1	Rhyl (CCL)

== Sixth round ==
Seven winners from the Fifth round plus one new club.

Tie no	Home	Score	Away
1	Merthyr Tydfil (SFL)	5–2	Chester (FL D3N)

== Semifinal ==
Cardiff City and Wrexham played at Shrewsbury, both matches between Newport County and Merthyr Tydfil were held at Cardiff.

Tie no	Home	Score	Away
1	Cardiff City (FL D2)	1–0	Wrexham (FL D3N)
2	Newport County (FL D3S)	1–1	Merthyr Tydfil (SFL)
replay	Newport County (FL D3S)	1–4	Merthyr Tydfil (SFL)

== Final ==
Final and replay were held at Swansea.

Tie no	Home	Score	Away
1	Merthyr Tydfil (SFL)	1–1	Cardiff City (FL D2)
replay	Merthyr Tydfil (SFL)	3–2	Cardiff City (FL D2)
