= Patsy of Paradise Place =

2002 novel by Rosie Harris

- First edition
- Author: Rosie Harris
- Language: English
- Genre: Romantic Fiction
- Publisher: Heinemann
- Publication date: 2002
- Publication place: United Kingdom
- Media type: Print (Hardcover and Paperback)
- Pages: 375

Patsy of Paradise Place, is a romantic fiction novel written by the English author Rosie Harris. The story is mostly set in Liverpool, and talks about the struggles of a young woman named Patsy Callaghan. It was first published in 2002.

== Plot summary ==
When Patsy Callaghan's father discovers that her mother, Maeve, neglects her, he stops going to sea. John Callagan buys a horse and cart and sets up as a carrier at Liverpool Docks. Patsy loves going out on the carrier with her father and Billy Grant, the boy that helps him. When one day John Callaghan is killed in an accident, and Maeave goes out again drinking binges, Billy, who is deeply in love with Patsy, helps her continue the business. Patsy falls in love with Bruno Alvarez a handsome fairground showman, and believes he is going to marry her and will travel to Spain together. When Patsy brings him to meet Maeve, he stays for the night and the next morning, Patsy finds Bruno and Maeve in bed together. Billy comforts her and tries to calm her down, until they end up making love. But when Maeve finds out that Patsy is pregnant, she throws her out of the house. Patsy hides in the stables and Billy takes care of the baby, Liam, when he is born. While she is hiding in the stables, Billy has an accident and is crippled. Unable to find Bruno, Patsy lives with Billy's family. As Liam gets older, Patsy starts working as a nurse. When Liam develops tuberculosis, Patsy decides to find Bruno and discovers that he and her mother went off together. Eventually, Liam dies and Patsy is once more depressed. Billy comforts her again, and she realises how much she loves him. They decide to open a new business on their own and get married.
