= Ernie Bryan =

Welsh footballer (1926–2008)

Personal information
- Full name: Ernest Newton Bryan
- Date of birth: 6 June 1926
- Place of birth: Hawarden, Wales
- Date of death: March 2008 (aged 81)
- Place of death: Flintshire, Wales
- Position: Full back

Youth career
- Chester

Senior career*
Years	Team	Apps	(Gls)
1949	Chester	1	(0)
- Colwyn Bay
- * Club domestic league appearances and goals

Ernest Bryan (6 June 1926 - March 2008) was a Welsh footballer.

Bryan made one peacetime appearance in The Football League for Chester, when he replaced regular right back Reg Butcher in a 3–3 draw at Darlington in January 1949. A product of the club's youth policy, he had earlier featured in wartime league matches for the club.

After leaving Chester, Bryan moved to Colwyn Bay.

== Bibliography ==
- Sumner, Chas (1997). On the Borderline: The Official History of Chester City F.C. 1885-1997. Yore Publications. ISBN 978-1-874427-52-0.
