= 1951–52 Welsh Cup =

Tournament details
- Country: Wales

Final positions
- Champions: (Wales) Rhyl
- Runners-up: (Wales) Merthyr Tydfil

The 1951–52 FAW Welsh Cup is the 65th season of the annual knockout tournament for competitive football teams in Wales.

== Key ==
League name pointed after clubs name.

- CCL - Cheshire County League
- FL D3N - Football League Third Division North
- SFL - Southern Football League

== Fifth round ==
Ten winners from the Fourth round and six new clubs.

Tie no	Home	Score	Away
1	Chester (FL D3N)	3–1	Bangor City (CCL)

== Sixth round ==
Tie no	Home	Score	Away
1	Wrexham (FL D3N)	0–0	Chester (FL D3N)
replay	Wrexham (FL D3N)	2–0	Chester (FL D3N)

== Semifinal ==
Cardiff City and Wrexham played at Shrewsbury, both matches between.

Tie no	Home	Score	Away
1	Barry Town (SFL)	1–1	Rhyl (CCL)
replay	Barry Town (SFL)	0–1	Rhyl (CCL)
2	Wrexham (FL D3N)	0–0	Merthyr Tydfil (SFL)

== Final ==
Final were held at Cardiff.

Tie no	Home	Score	Away
1	Rhyl (CCL)	4–3	Merthyr Tydfil (SFL)
