= Harry Jackson (footballer, born 1918) =

English footballer

Personal information
- Date of birth: 30 December 1918
- Place of birth: Blackburn, England
- Date of death: 19 August 1984 (aged 65)
- Place of death: Blackburn, England
- Position: Centre forward

Youth career
- Darwen

Senior career*
Years	Team	Apps	(Gls)
1942–1946	Burnley	0	(0)
1946–1948	Manchester City	8	(2)
1948–1949	Preston North End	18	(5)
1949	Blackburn Rovers	1	(0)
1949–1950	Chester	21	(10)
- Hyde United
Total		48	(17)
- * Club domestic league appearances and goals

Harry 'Jacko' Jackson (1918 – 1984) was a footballer who played as a centre forward or inside forward in the Football League for Manchester City, Preston North End, Blackburn Rovers and Chester. He also appeared for a variety of clubs as a 'guest' player during the war including Accrington Stanley, Tottenham Hotspur and Watford whilst being stationed around London and the South Coast serving in the Royal Navy.

In the 1948–49 season he scored 4 goals in 4 appearances for Mossley.

After his time with Chester he played for Hyde United, Ashton United, Nelson and Clitheroe.
