= Alan Beaumont (footballer) =

English footballer

Personal information
- Date of birth: 9 January 1927
- Place of birth: Liverpool, England
- Date of death: 1999 (aged 71–72)
- Position: Wing half

Senior career*
Years	Team	Apps	(Gls)
?–1948	South Liverpool		
1948–1949	Chester	5	(0)
1949–?	New Brighton		
1956–1957	Mossley		
- * Club domestic league appearances and goals

Alan Beaumont (9 January 1927 – 1999) was an English footballer.

Beaumont made five appearances in The Football League during 1948–49 for Chester but did not play for the club again. He had previously played for South Liverpool and later joined New Brighton.

In the 1956–57 season he played three times for Mossley.

== Bibliography ==
- Sumner, Chas (1997). On the Borderline: The Official History of Chester City F.C. 1885–1997. Yore Publications. ISBN 978-1-874427-52-0.
