= Jim Radford =

British singer

- Born: 1 October 1928; Hull, East Riding of Yorkshire, England
- Died: 6 November 2020 (aged 92) Lewisham, London, England
- Genres: Folk, Maritime music

James Radford (1 October 1928 – 6 November 2020) was an English folk singer-songwriter, peace campaigner and community activist. He was also the youngest known participant in the Allied invasion of Normandy in June 1944, aged only 15, as a galley boy upon Empire Larch, a deep-sea rescue tug.

The first song Radford wrote, "The Shores of Normandy", is also his most successful and best known, having been performed by him at two televised concerts at the Royal Albert Hall in 2014 and released as a single in May 2019 to raise funds for the Normandy Memorial Trust. It topped the Amazon and iTunes download charts in the first week of June 2019, and reached number 72 on the UK Singles Chart.

== Life and career ==
Radford was born in Hull, East Riding of Yorkshire, England in October 1928. He became a member of the Merchant Navy at 15 and later joined the Royal Navy upon turning 18.

He later became active in various peace campaigns. He retired after a varied career which included time as an engineering worker, in the press and in various roles in community work and social action initiatives.

Radford performed his song, "The Shores of Normandy", at the Royal Albert Hall in London in the 70th anniversary year of the invasion in 2014. In October 2015, Radford was appointed a Chevalier of the Legion of Honour by the French Republic "in recognition of... steadfast involvement in the Liberation of France during the Second World War".

He died on 6 November 2020 in hospital, after spending three weeks in intensive care following a diagnosis of COVID-19. He was 92 years old.

== See also ==
- List of peace activists
