= Joseph McKeown =

English photojournalist

Joseph McKeown (10 February 1925 – 12 February 2007) was an English photojournalist whose work documented the changes in Great Britain following the Second World War as well as embracing celebrity and fashion photography.

== Early life ==
McKeown grew up as one of a large, working-class London family. He left school at the age of 14 and went to work in the darkroom of the Daily Herald. He joined the Navy in 1943 and served with the Fleet Air Arm in the Far East on board HMS Ameer as a photographer. At the end of the Second World War, he returned to London.

He was offered a job at Illustrated London News in 1946 and he stayed with the magazine until 1952. In 1950, his picture Jitterbugging on a London Dance Floor won the international "News Picture of the Year" competition. He married Doris Leslie in 1952.

== Work for Picture Post ==
McKeown's years at Picture Post (1953 – 1957) saw him mature as a photographer, producing some of his most memorable work. These included assignments to the Soviet Baltic Fleet in 1953, featured in the coronation issue (a story about this has him drinking multiple toasts in vodka with the Soviet officers, ending in one to the Queen), the funeral of Sibelius, Princess Margaret's tour of the West Indies and the wedding of Grace Kelly and Prince Rainier of Monaco. His photograph Need for Speed, which depicts the great Argentine racing driver Fangio winning the 1954 French Grand Prix remains one of his most widely reproduced.

In 1954, he photographed Leonard Cheshire for Russell Braddon's biography, Leonard Cheshire VC: a story of war and peace.

In 1956, he was dispatched to Egypt to cover the Suez Crisis, an event which his brother Michael portrayed from the Israeli side. His photographs have become some of the defining images of the war and were widely reproduced on the 50th anniversary of the conflict. He was sent back home after he was blown out the back of a Land Rover.

== Later life and work ==
After leaving Picture Post, McKeown worked as a freelance, with photographs appearing frequently in Life and Paris Match. He did a considerable amount of advertising work in this era; probably the best remembered campaign he worked on was "Go to work on an egg".

In 1967, he took a picture of Donald Campbell rowing on Coniston Water, the evening before his fatal attempt at the water speed record. The picture was unpublished until 1981.

Also in 1967, he collaborated with Aubrey Wilson on London's Industrial Heritage. The Evening News said: "Illuminated by Joseph McKeown's moody, lyrical photographs, here is a guide to a London that has hitherto eluded eyes accustomed to other aesthetics standards." As such, Wilson and McKeown were among the pioneers of industrial heritage as an idea.

He moved, with his wife and two children, to Bungay, Suffolk in the early eighties. His best known photograph from this period was the 1990 picture of John Selwyn Gummer, then Minister of Agriculture, Fisheries and Food, feeding his daughter Cordelia a hamburger at the height of the BSE crisis.

Shortly after his death in 2007, his work was featured in a Getty Images exhibition of photographs from Picture Post.
