= Bert Foulds =

English footballer

Personal information
- Full name: Albert Foulds
- Date of birth: 8 August 1919
- Place of birth: Salford, England
- Date of death: 7 April 1993 (aged 73)
- Place of death: Krugersdorp, South Africa
- Position: Inside forward

Youth career
- Altrincham

Senior career*
Years	Team	Apps	(Gls)
1948–1949	Chester	31	(14)
1949–1950	Yeovil Town		
1950–1951	Rochdale	6	(0)
1951	Scarborough		
1951–1953	Rochdale	56	(23)
1953–1954	Crystal Palace	17	(4)
1954	Crewe Alexandra	14	(2)
1954	Congleton Town		
- * Club domestic league appearances and goals

Albert Foulds (8 August 1919 – 7 April 1993) was an English footballer who played as an inside forward in the Football League for Chester, Rochdale, Crystal Palace and Crewe Alexandra.
