= John Forsyth (footballer) =

Scottish footballer

Personal information
- Full name: John Thompson Forsyth
- Date of birth: 20 December 1918
- Place of birth: Dalmuir, Scotland
- Date of death: February 1995 (aged 76)
- Place of death: Wallasey, England
- Position: Winger

Senior career*
Years	Team	Apps	(Gls)
1938–1940	Dumbarton	6	(0)
1946–1948	New Brighton	64	(4)
1948–1949	Chester	32	(1)
- * Club domestic league appearances and goals

John Forsyth (20 December 1918 – February 1995) was a footballer who played as a winger for Dumbarton, New Brighton and Chester.
