= James Kelly Cole =

American poet (1885–1909)

James Kelly Cole (1885 – 1909) was a member of the Chicago Branch of the Industrial Workers of the World until his death in the fall of 1909. Cole was an active poet and prose writer whose work is of interest to IWW historians and critics of working class literature. Cole was killed in November 1909 when he apparently fell from a train between Chicago and Minneapolis en route to the Spokane free speech fight. Upon his untimely death, the IWW published a book of his writings to raise money for his aged parents. Little else is known of this poet-rebel except that he was convicted in 1907 of producing molds for counterfeit money.

== Writings ==
- Poems and Prose of James Kelly Cole, Industrial Workers of the World (1910)
