= Milk bar (disambiguation) =

A milk bar is a local general store or café.

Milk bar may also refer to:

- Milk Bar, a former nightclub in London, England managed by Nicky Holloway
- Milk Bar cafe, in Algiers which was bombed during the Algerian War of Independence by Zohra Drif
- Bar mleczny, a type of Polish restaurant, which literally means "milk bar"
- Milk Bar (bakery), a US bakery chain
