= Rosie Harris =

British author of romantic fiction (1925–2024)

- Born: Marion Rose Young; 12 July 1925; Cardiff, Wales
- Died: 18 October 2024 (aged 99)
- Occupation: Novelist
- Writing career
- Period: 1975–2018
- Genre: Romance novel

Marion Rose Harris (née Young; 12 July 1925 – 18 October 2024), known professionally as Rosie Harris, was a British author of romantic fiction. Her work is mainly set in Liverpool and Cardiff in the 1920s and 1930s.

== Early life and career ==
Harris was born in Cardiff, but from the age of five she went to live with her grandparents and grew up in an isolated cottage in the Dorset countryside. As a result of being a very lonely only child, she had plenty of time to read and also to dream up stories which she told to her imaginary friends. (Note: Information retrieved from http://www.rosiebooks.co.uk on 21 February 2008.) After leaving Gillingham Grammar School, she went back to Cardiff and worked as a clerk in the City Hall. It was here that she met and married a Grenadier Guardsman. She moved from Cardiff to his home on Merseyside and grew to know the Wallasey and Liverpool area.

Her writing career started as a freelance writer, writing for the Liverpool Echo and national magazines on fashion, homemaking and health topics under the by-line Marion Harris. Her first novel was published in 1975, followed by eight others all under the name Marion Harris. Additionally, she has written about twenty non-fiction books all under different pseudonyms. Ten years later, and with three children, Harris and her family moved to Buckinghamshire where she has lived ever since. Her children have all made their homes in the area and she now has six grandchildren and four great-grandchild.

== Later life work ==
From 2000, Harris wrote as Rosie Harris. She focused on romance sagas. These works are all set in the 1920s and 1930s and concentrate on strong and courageous female characters. As of 2015, she was published by Heinemann and Arrow Books Ltd, an imprint of Random House. Harris died on 18 October 2024, at the age of 99.

== Bibliography ==
=== As Marion Harris ===
- Soldiers' Wives (1986)
- Officers' Ladies (1987)
- Amelda (1989)
- Heart of the Dragon (1988)
- Just a Handsome Stranger (1990)
- Nesta (1999)
- Sighing for the Moon (1999)
- Captain of Her Heart (2000)

=== As Rosie Harris ===
1. *Turn of the Tide (2002)
2. *Troubled Waters (2002)
3. *Patsy of Paradise Place (2002)
4. *One Step Forward (2003)
5. *Looking for Love (2003)
6. *Winnie of the Waterfront (2004)
7. *Pins and Needles (2004)
8. *The Cobbler's Kids (2005)
9. *Sunshine and Showers (2005)
10. *At Sixes and Sevens (2005)
11. *Megan of Merseyside (2006)
12. *The Power of Dreams (2006)
13. *Sunshine and Shadows (2006)
14. *A Mother's Love (2006)
15. *Sing for Your Supper (2007)
16. *Waiting for Love (2007)
17. *Love Against All Odds (2007)
18. *A Dream of Love (2008)
19. *A Love Like Ours (2008)
20. *Love Changes Everything (2009)
21. *The Quality of Love (2009)
22. *Whispers of Love (2010)
23. *Ambitious Love (2010)
24. *The Price of Love (2011)
25. *A Brighter Dawn (2011)
26. *Hell Hath No Fury (2013)
27. *Stolen Moments (2013)
28. *Love or Duty (2014)
29. *Guarded Passions (2014)
30. *Moving On (2015)
31. *The Mixture As Before (2015)
32. *Heartbreak and Happiness (2016)
