= Tony Conyers =

British journalist

- Born: 30 June 1928 (age 97); United Kingdom
- Died: 25 September 2011 (aged 83); United Kingdom
- Occupation: Journalist

Tony Conyers (30 June 1928 – 25 September 2011) was a British journalist working for the Daily Telegraph and Daily Mirror. He covered Moscow and Paris for a number of years for the Telegraph.
