= Alec Penstone =

British World War II veteran (1925–2026)

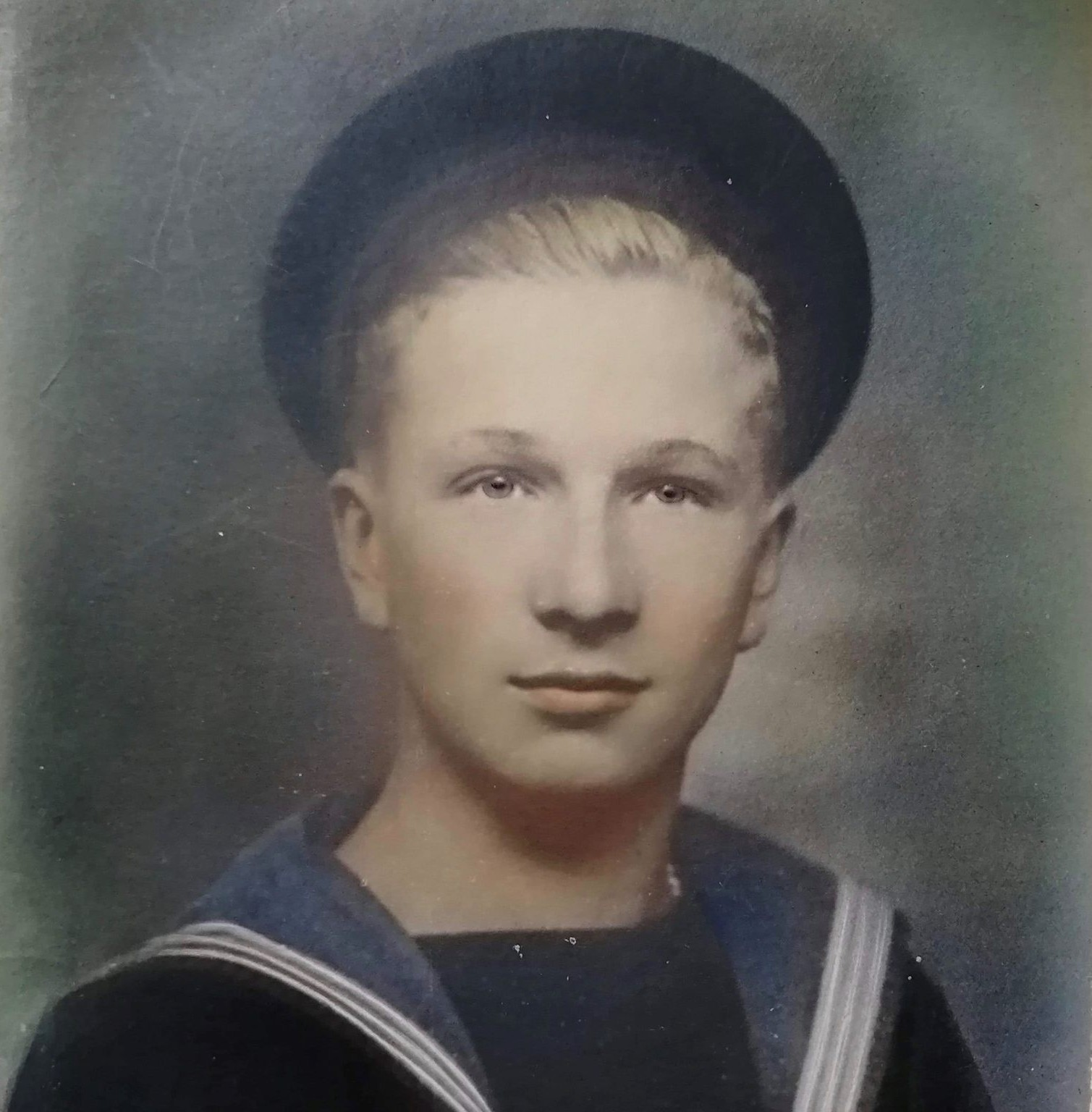
- Penstone during his time in the Navy
- Born: Alec William George Penstone; 23 April 1925; Tottenham, London, England
- Died: 28 May 2026 (aged 101); Newport, Isle of Wight, England
- Spouse: Gladys Isaac (m. 1945; died 2022)
- Children: 1
- Military career
- Allegiance: United Kingdom
- Branch: (United Kingdom) Royal Navy
- Service years: 1943–1946
- Rank: Able Seaman
- Unit: HMS Campania
- Known for: World War II veteran
- Conflicts: World War II; War in Europe; Arctic convoys; Normandy landings; Pacific War
- Awards: (United Kingdom) 1939–45 Star (United Kingdom) Atlantic Star (United Kingdom) Arctic Star (United Kingdom) Pacific Star (United Kingdom) Defence Medal (France) Legion of Honour (Russia) Medal of Ushakov

Alec William George Penstone (23 April 1925 – 28 May 2026) was a British World War II veteran who served in the Royal Navy during the war, notably aboard HMS Campania, an escort aircraft carrier. Records show that he participated in D-Day operations and Arctic convoy missions.

== Background and military career ==
Alec William George Penstone was born in Tottenham, London, on 23 April 1925. He volunteered as a teenage messenger during the London Blitz, reportedly leaving his factory job to contribute to the war effort.

During his naval career, he served on submarines before transferring to the HMS Campania, which played a key role in mine-sweeping and escort duties in the lead-up to the Normandy invasion.

Penstone began his service in the Royal Navy in 1943, after completing his training in December that year. He remained on active duty after the end of the war in Europe, serving through VE Day and then being deployed to the Far East, before he was demobilised in September 1946.

== Later years and public reflections ==
At the age of 99, he attended the 80th anniversary of D-Day in Normandy, where he laid a wreath by the statue of Field Marshal Montgomery and paid tribute to his fallen shipmates, calling their sacrifice a story "that must never ever be forgotten". His 100th birthday was celebrated by members of the Royal Naval Association's Isle of Wight branch.

On 7 November 2025, ahead of Remembrance Sunday, Penstone gave an interview on Good Morning Britain, where he voiced profound disappointment in the state of modern Britain, lamenting that freedoms he fought for had eroded and that his country was "a darn sight worse than when I fought for it". His comments prompted expressions of gratitude and a commitment to uphold the values for which he and his peers served.

== Personal life and death ==
Penstone met Gladys Isaac, an acrobatic dancer, on Christmas Eve 1943 and the couple married on 21 July 1945 after Penstone obtained a special marriage licence from Geoffrey Fisher, the Archbishop of Canterbury, two days before he returned to duty in Japan. They had a daughter, Jacqueline. The couple moved to Shanklin on the Isle of Wight in 2008. Gladys died in 2022, aged 96.

Penstone died at Mountbatten Hospice in Newport, Isle of Wight, on 28 May 2026, aged 101.
