= 1951–52 Southern Football League =

English Football league season

The 1951–52 Southern Football League season was the 49th in the history of the league, an English football competition.

At the end of the previous season Torquay United resigned their second team from the league. No new clubs had joined the league for this season so the league consisted of 22 remaining clubs. Merthyr Tydfil were champions for the third season in a row, winning their fourth Southern League title. Five Southern League clubs applied to join the Football League at the end of the season, but none were successful.

== League table ==
Southern Football League
- Season: 1951–52
- Champions: Merthyr Tydfil
- Matches: 462
- Goals: 1,601 (3.47 per match)

Pos	Team	Pld	W	D	L	GF	GA	GR	Pts
1	Merthyr Tydfil	42	27	6	9	128	60	2.133	60
2	Weymouth	42	22	13	7	81	42	1.929	57
3	Kidderminster Harriers	42	22	10	10	70	40	1.750	54
4	Guildford City	42	18	16	8	66	47	1.404	52
5	Hereford United	42	21	9	12	80	59	1.356	51
6	Worcester City	42	23	4	15	86	73	1.178	50
7	Kettering Town	42	18	10	14	83	56	1.482	46
8	Lovells Athletic	42	18	10	14	87	68	1.279	46
9	Gloucester City	42	19	8	15	68	55	1.236	46
10	Bath City	42	19	6	17	75	67	1.119	44
11	Headington United	42	16	11	15	55	53	1.038	43
12	Bedford Town	42	16	10	16	75	64	1.172	42
13	Barry Town	42	18	6	18	84	89	0.944	42
14	Chelmsford City	42	15	10	17	67	80	0.838	40
15	Dartford	42	15	9	18	63	65	0.969	39
16	Tonbridge	42	15	6	21	63	84	0.750	36
17	Yeovil Town	42	12	11	19	56	76	0.737	35
18	Cheltenham Town	42	15	4	23	59	85	0.694	34
19	Exeter City II	42	13	7	22	76	106	0.717	33
20	Llanelly	42	13	6	23	70	111	0.631	32
21	Gravesend & Northfleet	42	12	7	23	68	88	0.773	31
22	Hastings United	42	3	5	34	41	131	0.313	11

Source: rsssf.com
Rules for classification: 1) points; 2) goal ratio.

== Football League elections ==
Five Southern League clubs applied for election to the Football League. However, none were successful as all four League clubs were re-elected.

Club	League	Votes
Darlington	Football League	49
Exeter City	Football League	47
Walsall	Football League	45
Workington	Football League	40
Wigan Athletic	Lancashire Combination	9
Worcester City	Southern League	3
Bath City	Southern League	1
Merthyr Tydfil	Southern League	1
Peterborough United	Midland League	1
Nelson	Lancashire Combination	0
North Shields	North Eastern League	0
Headington United	Southern League	0
Yeovil Town	Southern League	0
New Brighton	Lancashire Combination	0
