= Joe Feeney (footballer) =

Scottish footballer

Personal information
- Full name: Joseph Feeney
- Date of birth: 21 July 1926
- Place of birth: Glasgow, Scotland
- Date of death: 1 December 1992 (aged 66)
- Place of death: Glasgow, Scotland
- Position: Forward

Senior career*
Years	Team	Apps	(Gls)
1951–1952	Chester	5	(0)
- * Club domestic league appearances and goals

Joe Feeney (21 July 1926 – 1 December 1992) was a Scottish footballer, who played as a forward in the Football League for Chester.
