= John Yates (footballer, born 1929) =

English footballer (1929–2020)

Personal information
- Date of birth: 18 November 1929
- Place of birth: Rotherham, England
- Date of death: 2 September 2020 (aged 90)
- Place of death: Burlington, Ontario, Canada
- Position: Winger

Senior career*
Years	Team	Apps	(Gls)
1951–1952	Chester	2	(0)
- * Club domestic league appearances and goals

John Yates (18 November 1929 – 2 September 2020) was an English footballer, who played as a winger in the Football League for Chester.

He moved to Canada in 1974 and became involved with the Salvation Army, often acting as a musical conductor of their bands. Yates died on 2 September 2020 at the age of 90.
