= Elaine Horseman =

British children's writer

- Born: Elaine Hall; 23 November 1925; Lichfield, Staffordshire, England, UK
- Died: April 1999 (aged 73); Bristol, England, UK
- Occupation: Writer
- Writing career
- Genre: Children's fantasy novels

Elaine Horseman née Hall (23 November 1925 – April 1999) was a British author of three children's books, which centre on five children in an old victorian house and their experiences with a book of magic spells. Horseman's first novel Hubble's Bubble was published first in England and in Germany, France, Sweden, Denmark, Finland, Spain and Portugal.

== Life ==
Elaine Hall was born in 1925 in Lichfield, Staffordshire to Harold Hall, a Vicar Choral, and Olive E. Bowey. She was the second of nine children and "grew up in a house very like the Hubbles', in the Cathedral Close at Lichfield in Staffordshire". In 1950 she married Leslie A. Horseman, a computer applications engineer, with whom she moved to Bristol and had two sons: Stephen Thomas and Christopher Michael. She became qualified as a teacher at the University of Birmingham and worked as a primary school teacher from 1944, before she gave up teaching in 1962 in order to write.

Of the second Hubbles or Boffins Club book, the American journal Kirkus Reviews complemented the easy transitions between fantasy and reality and observed that the children "keep up a steady banter often pleasantly silly, frequently affected, and always very British."

Horseman died in Bristol, April 1999.

== Works ==
- Hubble's Bubble, illustrated by John Sergeant (Chatto & Windus, 1964); US ed., 1964, LCCN 64-20786
- The Hubbles' Treasure Hunt, illus. Sergeant (Chatto & Windus, 1965); US ed., 1966, LCCN 66-11773
- The Hubbles and the Robot, illus. Sergeant (Chatto & Windus, 1968)

The Boffins' Club comprises the Hubbles—12-year-old Alaric and his 8-year-old sister, Sarah, who live with their eccentric grandfather in the town of Stoweminster—together with Charlotte, Jonathan and Peter Vaughan who arrive for a holiday. In the first novel, Hubble's Bubble, Alaric discovers a book of ancient spells and, with Sarah's help, turns himself into a cat.

In The Hubbles' Treasure Hunt, the Boffins Club goes on to experiments three and six in the book. A clue to treasure buried during the English Civil War leads them to try the third experiment, which allows travel back in time. The sixth experiment makes it possible to breathe under water, when a prehistoric mammal, found on another trip into history, becomes lost.

In The Hubbles and the Robot, Alaric Hubble brings back a robot housemaid from the 23rd Century.
