= Billy March =

English footballer

Personal information
- Full name: William March
- Date of birth: 28 February 1925
- Place of birth: Chester-le-Street, England
- Date of death: 1974 (aged 48–49)
- Position: Full-back

Senior career*
Years	Team	Apps	(Gls)
–1951	Ferryhill Athletic		
1951–1952	Barnsley	2	(0)
1952–1957	Gateshead	134	(0)
- * Club domestic league appearances and goals

William March (28 February 1925 – 1974) was an English footballer who played as a full-back.

March played in The Football League for Barnsley and Gateshead between 1951 and 1957 after playing in the Northern League with Ferryhill Athletic.

== Sources ==
- "BILLY MARCH". Post War English & Scottish Football League A–Z Player's Transfer Database.
- "Billy March". English National Football Archive.
