= Billy Pearson (footballer) =

Irish footballer

Personal information
- Full name: William George Arthur Pearson
- Date of birth: 23 October 1921
- Place of birth: Clonmel, Ireland
- Date of death: 23 May 2009 (aged 87)
- Place of death: West Yorkshire, England
- Position: Winger

Youth career
- Royal Air Force

Senior career*
Years	Team	Apps	(Gls)
1946–1949	Grimsby Town	35	(8)
1949–1950	Chester	12	(3)
Total		47	(11)
- * Club domestic league appearances and goals

Billy Pearson (1921–2009) was an Irish footballer, who played as a winger in the Football League for Grimsby Town and Chester.
