= Duncan Harrigan =

Scottish footballer (1921–2005)

Personal information
- Full name: Duncan Harrigan
- Date of birth: 26 June 1921
- Place of birth: Paisley, Renfrewshire, Scotland
- Date of death: 16 February 2005 (aged 83)
- Place of death: Paisley, Renfrewshire, Scotland
- Position: Centre forward

Youth career
- 1945–1946: St Mirren

Senior career*
Years	Team	Apps	(Gls)
1946–1948	Crewe Alexandra	57	(23)
1948	Aston Villa	0	(0)
1948–1949	Chester	20	(4)
- Colwyn Bay
Total		77	(27)
- * Club domestic league appearances and goals

Duncan Harrigan (26 June 1921 – 16 February 2005) was a Scottish footballer who played as a centre forward in the Football League for Crewe Alexandra and Chester.
