= Bill Jones (footballer, born 1924) =

English footballer

Personal information
- Full name: William John B. Jones
- Date of birth: 6 June 1924
- Place of birth: Liverpool, England
- Date of death: April 1995 (aged 70)
- Place of death: Chester, Cheshire, England
- Position: Forward

Senior career*
Years	Team	Apps	(Gls)
1948–1950	Manchester City	39	(20)
1951–1952	Chester	25	(14)
- Wellington Town
Total		64	(34)
- * Club domestic league appearances and goals

Bill Jones (1924-1995) was a footballer who played as a forward in the Football League for Manchester City and Chester.

He subsequently played non-league football, playing for Witton Albion before joining Mossley in the 1955–56 season where he made 15 appearances scoring two goals.
