= Maurice Line =

British library and information scientist (1928–2010)

- Born: 21 June 1928; Bedford, England
- Died: 21 September 2010 (aged 82)
- Education: University of Oxford
- Employer(s): Bodleian Library; University of Bath; British Library
- Spouse: Joyce Line
- Children: 2

Maurice Bernard Line (21 June 1928 – 21 September 2010) was a leading figure in library and information science in the UK. He was director general of the British Library Lending Division from 1974 until 1985 and director general for Science, Technology and Industry between 1985 and 1988.

== Life and career ==
Line was born in Bedford and educated at Bedford School. He read English at Exeter College at the University of Oxford.

His first post as a librarian was at the Bodleian Library in 1950. He became librarian of the University of Bath in 1968. In 1971 he was appointed head of the National Central Library, and was involved with the British Library from its inception, becoming a member of the organising committee when the BL was first planned in 1971 and serving as a member of its board from 1974 until his retirement in 1988.

From 1974 to 1985 he was director general of the British Library Lending Division (now the Document Supply Centre) at Boston Spa, and from 1985 to 1988 he was the British Library's director general for science, technology and industry.

Line also received an Honorary Doctorate from Heriot-Watt University in 1980

He died on 21 September 2010 and was survived by his wife Joyce and their children, Philip and Jill.

== Works ==
- A Bibliography of Russian Literature in English Translation to 1900 (excluding periodicals) (1963)
- Library Surveys (1967)
- Universal Availability of Publications (1983)
- Line on Interlending (1988)
- A Little off Line (1988)
- Academic Library Management (1990)
