= Bernard Port =

English footballer

Personal information
- Full name: Bernard Harry Port
- Date of birth: 14 December 1925
- Place of birth: Burton-on-Trent, England
- Date of death: 27 August 2007 (aged 81)
- Place of death: Liverpool, England
- Position: Goalkeeper

Senior career*
Years	Team	Apps	(Gls)
1951–1953	Chester	9	(0)
- * Club domestic league appearances and goals

Bernard Harry Port (14 December 1925 - 27 August 2007) was an English footballer, who played as a goalkeeper in the Football League for Chester.
