= Tom Mackie =

Scottish footballer

Personal information
- Full name: Thomas Forbes Mackie
- Date of birth: 30 March 1918
- Place of birth: Burntisland, Scotland
- Date of death: 2 February 1989 (aged 70)
- Place of death: Burntisland, Scotland
- Position: Left back

Senior career*
Years	Team	Apps	(Gls)
1938–1947	St Johnstone	0	(0)
1947–1948	New Brighton	2	(0)
1948–1949	Chester	5	(0)
- Runcorn
Total		7	(0)
- * Club domestic league appearances and goals

Thomas Forbes Mackie (30 March 1918 – 2 February 1989) was a Scottish professional footballer who played as a left back.

== Career ==
Born in Burntisland, Mackie began his career at St Johnstone, before playing in the English Football League for New Brighton and Chester.

He also played non-league football for Runcorn.
