= Les Devonshire =

English footballer (1926–2012)

Personal information
- Full name: Leslie Ernest Devonshire
- Date of birth: 13 June 1926
- Place of birth: Acton, England
- Date of death: 19 December 2012 (aged 86)
- Place of death: Southall, England
- Position: Winger

Senior career*
Years	Team	Apps	(Gls)
1945–1948	Queens Park Rangers	0	(0)
1948–1949	Brentford	0	(0)
1949–1950	Wealdstone		
1950–1951	Chester	44	(4)
1951–1955	Crystal Palace	83	(12)
1955–1956	Margate	23	(12)
1956–1960	Canterbury City		
- * Club domestic league appearances and goals

Leslie Ernest Devonshire (13 June 1926 – 19 December 2012) was an English professional footballer who made 127 appearances in The Football League for Chester and Crystal Palace between 1950 and 1955. His son, Alan Devonshire, was capped by England.

== Playing career ==
Devonshire played as a winger and began his career with Queens Park Rangers and then Brentford without making league appearances for either. After a spell with non-league Wealdstone, Devonshire joined Football League Third Division North side Chester in time for the 1950–51 season. Devonshire missed just two first-team games during the campaign for Chester, marking his home debut with a goal in a 3–1 win over Oldham Athletic on 23 August 1950.

He then returned south and joined Crystal Palace, where he spent four years involved in the first-team. This was followed by a spell playing for non-league sides Margate and Canterbury City until 1960.

Devonshire lived in Perivale, Middlesex in his last years. He died on 19 December 2012, leaving 11 grandchildren.
