= James Cole Mountflorence =

American diplomat

James Cole Mountflorence (born James Cole; died January 31, 1820) was an American businessman and Federalist diplomat in Paris during the French Revolution. He went to France in 1792 as an agent for the mercantile firm of William Blount, Thomas Blount, and John Gray Blount. In 1794, he became Chancellor to the American Consulate at Paris. Following Charles Cotesworth Pinckney's expulsion from France in 1796, Mountflorence was the primary contact in Paris between the French and American governments. The next year, he served as an intermediary during the XYZ Affair.

== Early life ==
Mountflorence was the son of an English father and Irish mother who immigrated to France in the middle of the eighteenth century. Although there is no known familial connection, he apparently adopted the surname Mountflorence because John Cole of Enniskillen, County Fermanagh, Ireland became Baron Mountflorence in 1760.

In 1778, Mountflorence departed France to join the American Revolution. While recovering from illness, he tutored students in New Bern, North Carolina. In 1780, Mountflorence became a brigade major under William Richardson Davie in the North Carolina militia and quartermaster of the Salisbury District. After the war, Mountflorence served as a deputy surveyor and land agent in Middle Tennessee, then known as the Cumberland region. By 1787, he was working for John Gray and Thomas Blount, Merchants—a mercantile firm established by William Blount, Thomas Blount, and John Gray Blount. Around this time, he settled in Nashville and began practicing law.

Mountflorence was a delegate to the United States Constitution ratification convention in Fayetteville, North Carolina in 1789. Later that year he unsuccessfully ran for Congress. In 1791, Mountflorence briefly advised United States Secretary of State Thomas Jefferson regarding a land dispute between Virginia and Tennessee (then a federal territory known as the Territory South of the River Ohio). In January 1792, Mountflorence sailed to Europe on business for the Blounts.

== Diplomatic career ==
In Paris, Mountflorence quickly befriended influential Americans, such as American ambassador Gouverneur Morris. He also sent an intriguing proposal to the French minister of foreign affairs, Pierre Lebrun, asking to lead a covert mission against Spanish Louisiana. Lebrun rejected Mountflorence's request, but the proposal bears striking resemblance to the plan adopted several weeks later in which Lebrun chose Edmond-Charles Genêt to launch a similar mission.

After a brief trip to the United States in 1793, Mountflorence was arrested when he returned to France, which was in the midst of the Reign of Terror. Following Gouverneur Morris's exertions, Mountflorence was released and spent the duration of the Reign of Terror in Switzerland. Upon returning to Paris, he began working on privateering cases. In October, 1794, he reached an agreement with the American Consul in Paris, Fulwar Skipwith, to help handle consular duties as Chancellor to the American Consulate. Besides his consular duties, Mountflorence frequently served as an intermediary between the American and French governments and provided intelligence to ambassador James Monroe.

When newly appointed American ambassador, Charles Cotesworth Pinckney, was expelled from France in 1796, Mountflorence became the primary contact between Pinckney and the French government. Skipwith, a Jeffersonian Republican, had fallen out of favor with the Washington and Adams administrations, thus leaving Mountflorence, a staunch Federalist, with effective control over consular and diplomatic affairs. Throughout 1797, Mountflorence negotiated with several officials of the French government, including influential member of the Council of Five Hundred Claude-Emmanuel de Pastoret. Shortly after the coup of 18 fructidor, Pinckney, John Marshall, and Elbridge Gerry arrived in Paris as envoys to negotiate a peace agreement. Again, Mountflorence served as an unofficial interlocutor. He received one of the first contacts from French foreign minister, Charles Maurice de Talleyrand-Périgord, warning the envoys that they would have to meet with Talleyrand's agents before negotiating with Talleyrand himself. In subsequent correspondence, these agents were referred to as W, X, Y, and Z, thus giving the diplomatic fiasco its famous title, the XYZ Affair.

Following the publication of the XYZ dispatches, Mountflorence was forced to flee Paris. He then became private secretary to William Vans Murray, the United States Ambassador to the Batavian Republic. When Murray was appointed as part of an American peace commission, Mountflorence returned to Paris, though he seems to have had no substantive role in the negotiations. In 1801, Mountflorence became private secretary to Robert R. Livingston, the newly appointed United States Ambassador to France.

== Later life ==
Mountflorence continued to represent aggrieved American merchants whose ships and cargoes had been captured or detained by French privateers. He also sought to recover consular fees from Fulwar Skipwith, with whom he had signed agreements in 1794 and 1799. Eventually, Mountflorence brought suit against Skipwith. The lawsuit exacerbated tensions within the increasingly partisan diplomatic corps in Paris. One of Skipwith's allies later reported Mountflorence to the French authorities. Mountflorence was tried for fraud. He was acquitted but nonetheless imprisoned for over a year.

Mountflorence's later attempts to regain a position in the diplomatic corps were unsuccessful. After several illnesses, he died in Paris on January 31, 1820, and was buried at Père Lachaise Cemetery.
