= Nelson Stiffle =

English footballer (1928–2005)

Nelson Stifle
Personal information
- Full name: Nelson Everard Stifle
- Date of birth: 30 July 1928
- Place of birth: British India
- Date of death: 8 April 2005 (aged 76)
- Place of death: Brisbane, Australia
- Position: Outside right

Senior career*
Years	Team	Apps	(Gls)
1950-1951	Chester Reserves		
1951	Ashton United	15	(1)
1951-1952	Crystal Palace		
1951–1952	Chester	7	
1952–1954	Altrincham	72	(35)
1954–1955	Chesterfield	38	(9)
1955–1958	Bournemouth	35	(7)
1958–1960	Exeter City	94	(17)
1960–1961	Coventry City	15	(2)
1961–1969	Bankstown		

Managerial career
- Bankstown
- * Club domestic league appearances and goals

Nelson Everard Stifle (1928–2005) was an English football player and coach.

== Playing career ==
Stifle played 15 times for Ashton United between March and September 1951. Before that, he played for the Chester Reserves in the Cheshire League. In September 1951 he signed for Crystal Palace for a £100 transfer fee from Ashton, but by December he had returned to Chester. After seven appearances for Chester's first team, he was signed by Altrincham in 1952. He played 72 times for Altrincham before being signed by Chesterfield in March 1954. He stayed at Chesterfield until May 1955, playing 38 times.

He signed for Bournemouth and Boscombe Athletic before the 1955–56 season. In almost three seasons at Bournemouth he played 35 matches. In 2009 The Times ranked him 24th in their Top 50 Bournemouth players list.

In March 1958 he joined Exeter City. He played 94 matches for Exeter before a move to Coventry City in July 1960. After 15 appearances for Coventry he emigrated to Australia where he played several seasons for Bankstown.

== Coaching career ==
While still a player, Stifle professionally coached Bankstown First, Second and Third Grade Divisions in the New South Wales State League.

== Personal life ==
Stifle was born in Calcutta, British India and was of Anglo-Indian descent. He was one of 13 children.

He married Mavis Amy Barraclough, and the couple had three children: Michael, Jeffrey and Diane. Barraclough reportedly died in 1972.

Nelson died in April 2005 in Brisbane, Australia, due to a heart condition.
