= James D. Cole =

American politician

James Dee Cole

Member of the Texas House of Representatives 1961 to 1975
- In office January 10, 1961 – January 14, 1975

Personal details
- Born: November 3, 1937 (age 88) Cumby, Hopkins County, Texas
- Died: September 6, 2026 Austin, Texas
- Party: Democratic
- Education: University of Texas - Austin

James Dee Cole (born November 3, 1937) was an American politician. He served as a Democratic member in the Texas House of Representatives from 1961 to 1975.
