= Jim Cole (footballer) =

Welsh footballer

Personal information
- Full name: James Edward Cole
- Date of birth: 14 August 1925
- Place of birth: Wrexham, Wales
- Date of death: May 1997
- Position: Full back

Senior career*
Years	Team	Apps	(Gls)
1947–1949	Bolton Wanderers	0	(0)
1949–1950	Chester	1	(0)
- * Club domestic league appearances and goals

Jim Cole was a Wales footballer who played as a full back in the Football League for Chester.
