= James Fletcher (footballer) =

English footballer (1926–2014)

Jim Fletcher
Personal information
- Full name: James Robert Fletcher
- Date of birth: 23 December 1926
- Place of birth: Brewood, Staffordshire, England
- Date of death: March 2014 (aged 87)
- Place of death: North Yorkshire, England
- Position: Forward

Senior career*
Years	Team	Apps	(Gls)
- Bilston
1950–1951	Birmingham City	0	(0)
1951–1952	Chester	23	(9)
–	Wellington Town		
- * Club domestic league appearances and goals

James Robert Fletcher (23 December 1926 – March 2014) was an English footballer who played as a forward in the Football League for Chester. He was on the books of Birmingham City without making a first-team appearance, and played non-league football for clubs including Bilston and Wellington Town.
