= Ernie Jones (footballer, born 1919) =

Welsh footballer

Personal information
- Full name: Ernest Jones
- Date of birth: 9 December 1919
- Place of birth: Ruabon, Wales
- Date of death: 2011 (aged 91–92)
- Place of death: Ceredigion, Wales
- Position: Forward

Senior career*
Years	Team	Apps	(Gls)
1949–1951	Chester	6	(1)
- * Club domestic league appearances and goals

Ernie Jones (9 December 1919 – May 2011) was a Welsh footballer, who played as a forward in the Football League for Chester.
