= 1950–51 Southern Football League =

Southern Football League
- Season: 1950–51
- Champions: Merthyr Tydfil
- Matches: 506
- Goals: 1,895 (3.75 per match)

The 1950–51 Southern Football League season was the 48th in the history of the league, an English football competition.

At the end of the previous season Colchester United and Gillingham were elected to the Football League. The league consisted of 24 clubs, including 22 clubs from the previous season, and two newly elected clubs - Kettering Town and Llanelly. Merthyr Tydfil were champions for the second season in a row, winning their third Southern League title. Six Southern League clubs applied to join the Football League at the end of the season, but none were successful.

== League table ==
Pos	Team	Pld	W	D	L	GF	GA	GR	Pts	Results
1	Merthyr Tydfil	44	29	8	7	156	66	2.364	66	
2	Hereford United	44	27	7	10	110	69	1.594	61	
3	Guildford City	44	23	8	13	88	60	1.467	54	
4	Chelmsford City	44	21	12	11	84	58	1.448	54	
5	Llanelly	44	19	13	12	89	73	1.219	51	
6	Cheltenham Town	44	21	8	15	91	61	1.492	50	
7	Headington United	44	18	11	15	84	83	1.012	47	
8	Torquay United II	44	20	6	18	93	79	1.177	46	Resigned from the league
9	Exeter City II	44	16	12	16	90	94	0.957	44	
10	Weymouth	44	16	12	16	82	88	0.932	44	
11	Tonbridge	44	16	12	16	79	87	0.908	44	
12	Gloucester City	44	16	11	17	81	76	1.066	43	
13	Yeovil Town	44	13	15	16	72	72	1.000	41	
14	Worcester City	44	15	11	18	69	78	0.885	41	
15	Bath City	44	15	10	19	66	73	0.904	40	
16	Dartford	44	14	11	19	61	70	0.871	39	
17	Bedford Town	44	15	9	20	64	94	0.681	39	
18	Gravesend & Northfleet	44	12	14	18	65	83	0.783	38	
19	Kettering Town	44	13	11	20	87	87	1.000	37	
20	Lovells Athletic	44	12	13	19	81	93	0.871	37	
21	Kidderminster Harriers	44	13	9	22	58	103	0.563	35	
22	Barry Town	44	13	7	24	54	104	0.519	33	
23	Hastings United	44	11	6	27	91	143	0.636	28	
24	Chingford Town	0	0	0	0	0	0	—	0	Club folded, record expunged

Source: rsssf.com
Rules for classification: 1) points; 2) goal ratio.

== Football League elections ==
Six Southern League clubs applied for election to the Football League. However, none were successful as only Workington of the North Eastern League received more votes than a League club (New Brighton).

Club	League	Votes
Watford	Football League	48
Accrington Stanley	Football League	46
Crystal Palace	Football League	45
Workington	North Eastern League	28
New Brighton	Football League	18
Wigan Athletic	Lancashire Combination	4
Nelson	Lancashire Combination	1
North Shields	North Eastern League	1
Worcester City	Southern League	1
Merthyr Tydfil	Southern League	1
Bath City	Southern League	1
Northwich Victoria	Cheshire League	0
South Liverpool	Cheshire League	0
Chelmsford City	Southern League	0
Hereford United	Southern League	0
Peterborough United	Midland League	0
Llanelly	Southern League	0
