= Francis Dennis Ramsay =

Scottish painter

Francis Dennis Ramsay (15 March 1925 – 8 February 2009), known as Dennis Ramsay, was a Scottish portrait painter, trained in London and Paris, who worked mainly in Australia in the classical tradition.

== Background and training ==
A painter in the classical tradition, Ramsay was born in London of Scottish descent. He was related to the Scottish artists Allan Ramsay (1713–1784) and James Ramsay (1759–1854). Towards the end of World War II, he served in the RAF, and in 1952 he made a model of the State Coach which was, exceptionally, accepted by HM Queen Elizabeth II. This model coach was built as part of an exhibition undertaken in collaboration with Clothilde Highton GMC (Guild of Memorial Craftsmen), an Australian painter and sculptor living in Arundel, Sussex.

His formal training included reading Architecture at University College London and three years’ study in Florence (1953–1955) as a pupil of Pietro Annigoni (1910–1988), the internationally renowned grande maestro portrait painter of the 20th century (Annigoni subsequently became a godfather to Ramsay's younger son, Justin).

== Media and technique ==
Ramsay's training included drawing, both in pencil and in china ink, as well as water colour. However, much of his time as a pupil of Annigoni involved oil tempera (or tempera grassa, i.e. egg-oil) – originally a 16th-century technique which entails meticulous time-consuming work and which was revived in Italy during the 1930s by Dr Nicholas Lokhoff (Николай Николаевич Лохов 1872–1948), an exiled Russian industrial chemist and amateur painter. With the egg acting as an emulsifier, the technique allows water to be mixed with the paint thereby enabling the production of ultra-fine subtle glazes.

== Range of work ==
Of his first one-man show in London in 1955, The art critic of The Times described Ramsay's work as "beyond reproach."

In 1965 the Church Times described his treatment of religious themes as being "painted with extraordinary technical accomplishment in terms relevant to the present age, but of deep spirituality".

The Australian art dealer, Tom Silver said he was "the best living still life artist in Australia in old master technique. In fact, there are only a few living artists worldwide who are capable to produce this class." In 2004 Martin Gallon, the British fine art expert, commented "His close attention to detail is reminiscent of the work of the Pre-Raphaelites whose principal aim was to paint from nature as closely as possible; in Ramsay's work, one can see resonances of this aim, yet its simplistic beauty and close observation challenges our senses. These are restful images and their quality demands respect: the message is one of enjoyment. To convey an enjoyment of our natural surroundings and the delicacies of nature is very much Ramsay's mantra."

He has painted three Royal portraits: HRH Princess Alexandra (1955), HM King Faisal of Iraq (1957) and HRH Prince Philip (2001), commissioned to celebrate his 80th birthday. Portraits of other notable personalities include Sir Winston Churchill, Sir Robert Menzies and Dame Flora MacLeod of MacLeod (the late 28th Chief of that clan).

His works are in many public and private collections throughout Europe, USA, Canada and Australia, including those of several churches, universities, schools and even banks.

== Exhibitions ==
- 2005 Delshan Gallery, Melbourne
- 2004 Cotham Gallery 101, Melbourne
- 2001 Adam Galleries, Melbourne: Dennis Ramsay "Classical Light"
- 1994-2000 Tom Silver Fine Art, Melbourne & Sydney - annual exhibitor
- 1999 The Hawksburn Gallery, Melbourne
- 1995 & 1996 Duke Gallery, Melbourne
- 1980-1994 Balmoral Galleries, Geelong - annual exhibitor
- 1964-1985 Old Maine Gallery, Seattle - annual exhibitor
- 1975 & 1976 Van der Straeten Galleries, New York
- 1974 Pieter Wenning Gallery, Johannesburg
- 1961 Galleries of the Federation of British Artists, London: Paintings and Drawings by Pietro Annigoni (with 3 other past pupils)
- 1956-60's Royal Academy London - frequent exhibitor
- 1956-60's Royal Portrait Society London - frequent exhibitor
- 1955 & 1956 Arthur Jeffress Gallery, London
