= Billy Foulkes =

Welsh footballer

Personal information
- Full name: William Isaiah Foulkes
- Date of birth: 29 May 1926
- Place of birth: Merthyr Tydfil, Wales
- Date of death: 7 February 1979 (aged 52)
- Place of death: Chester, England
- Height: 5 ft 10 in (1.78 m)
- Position: Inside forward

Senior career*
Years	Team	Apps	(Gls)
1945–1948	Cardiff City	0	(0)
1948–1951	Chester	118	(14)
1951–1954	Newcastle United	58	(8)
1954–1956	Southampton	23	(1)
1956	Winsford United		
1956–1961	Chester	178	(23)
1961–????	Hyde United		

International career
1951–1954	Wales	11	(1)
- * Club domestic league appearances and goals

William Isaiah Foulkes (29 May 1926 – 7 February 1979) was a Welsh international footballer, who played as an inside forward for Newcastle United, Southampton and Chester in the 1940s and 1950s, winning the FA Cup with Newcastle in 1952.

== Playing career ==
Born in Merthyr Tydfil, he signed as a professional with Cardiff City in February 1945. He failed to break into the first team and in April 1948 he moved north to join Chester in the Third Division North. He soon became a regular selection at inside right laying on the crosses for Cam Burgess to score the goals. After two full seasons at Sealand Road, he was signed by First Division Newcastle United for £12,500 in October 1951, a record sale for Chester at the time.

He made his debut for Newcastle in a 4–2 victory at Huddersfield Town on 13 October 1951. A no-nonsense, tough, shrewd and very capable player, he was soon a regular fixture on the right, providing scoring opportunities for Jackie Milburn and George Robledo. Ten days after his transfer Foulkes scored for Wales against England with his first kick in his first international. He appeared in every match in Newcastle's run to the 1952 FA Cup final and picked up a winner's medal at Wembley Stadium on 3 May 1952 after little more than six months with United.

He remained at St James' Park for two more seasons until moving to Southampton in August 1954. During his spell with Newcastle, he made a total of 67 appearances with 9 goals. He also made 11 international appearances for Wales.

In July 1954, Southampton's manager George Roughton paid £12,000 to bring Foulkes and Tommy Mulgrew to The Dell of which £5,000 was attributed to Foulkes. In his first season with the "Saints" he suffered a back injury and made only 23 league appearances. Southampton claimed that he must have been carrying the injury when he transferred and sought a reduction in the transfer fee. The claim was submitted to the Football Association for consideration and while waiting for the case to be heard Foulkes returned to Cheshire to play for Winsford United in the Cheshire County League.

Eventually the appeal found against Southampton, leaving Foulkes to resume his professional career. Chester paid Southampton less than £1,000 for his registration, with Foulkes declaring "I would not have signed for any other Football League club". He went on to make over 180 appearances for them over the next five years, with his overall club total of 296 league appearances being the joint 10th highest in Chester's history.

In July 1961 he retired from full-time football, with his final appearance for Chester having been in a 2–1 home defeat to Doncaster Rovers on 22 April 1961. Foulkes acquired a milk bar in Chester, turning out occasionally for Hyde United. He died in Chester on 7 February 1979 aged 52.

== Honours ==
Newcastle United

- FA Cup: 1951–52
