= Grenville Booth =

English footballer

Personal information
- Full name: Grenville Vincent Booth
- Date of birth: 2 April 1925
- Place of birth: Chester, England
- Date of death: May 1990 (aged 65)
- Position: Wing half

Youth career
- Chester

Senior career*
Years	Team	Apps	(Gls)
1948–1950	Chester	8	(0)
1950–?	Colwyn Bay		
- * Club domestic league appearances and goals

Grenville Booth (2 April 1925 – May 1990) was an English footballer.

Booth made eight appearances for his hometown club of Chester in 1948–49, having progressed through the club's junior ranks. The following season saw him make one further first-team appearance in an FA Cup tie against Goole Town before he moved on to Colwyn Bay.

== Bibliography ==
- Sumner, Chas (1997). On the Borderline: The Official History of Chester City F.C. 1885-1997. Yore Publications. ISBN 978-1-874427-52-0.
