= Jim Hankinson =

English footballer

Personal information
- Full name: James Hankinson
- Date of birth: 1 July 1928
- Place of birth: Preston, England
- Date of death: June 2016 (aged 87)
- Place of death: Blackpool, England
- Position: Inside forward

Senior career*
Years	Team	Apps	(Gls)
19??–1947	Lancaster City		
1947–1950	Preston North End	0	(0)
1950–1951	Chester	15	(1)
- * Club domestic league appearances and goals

James Hankinson (1 July 1928 – June 2016) was an English footballer, who played as an inside forward in the Football League for Chester. He was on the books of Preston North End without playing league football for them, and previously played for non-league club Lancaster City.
