= Ralph Moremont =

English footballer

Ralph Morement
Personal information
- Date of birth: 24 September 1924
- Place of birth: Sheffield, England
- Date of death: 1982 (aged 57–58)
- Place of death: Sheffield, England
- Position: Wing half

Senior career*
| Years | Team | Apps | (Gls) |
| 1949–1950 | Sheffield United | 1 | (0) |
| 1950–1953 | Chester | 121 | (19) |
| 1955–1956 | Rochdale | 1 | (0) |
| Total | | 123 | (19) |
- * Club domestic league appearances and goals

Ralph Morement (1924–1982) was an English footballer, who played as a wing half in the Football League for Sheffield United, Chester and Rochdale.
