= Ted Elliott (footballer) =

English footballer

Personal information
- Date of birth: 24 May 1919
- Place of birth: Carlisle, England
- Date of death: September 1984 (aged 65)
- Place of death: Carlisle, England
- Position: Goalkeeper

Youth career
- Carlisle United

Senior career*
Years	Team	Apps	(Gls)
1946–1948	Wolverhampton Wanderers	7	(0)
1948–1951	Chester	59	(0)
1951–1952	Halifax Town	33	
Total		99	(0)
- * Club domestic league appearances and goals

Ted Elliott (24 May 1919 – September 1984) was an English footballer, who played as a goalkeeper in the Football League for Wolverhampton Wanderers, Chester and Halifax Town.
