= Dave McNeil =

English footballer

Personal information
- Date of birth: 14 May 1921
- Place of birth: Chester, England
- Date of death: 21 April 1993 (aged 71)
- Place of death: Chester, England
- Position: Full back

Youth career
- Hoole Alexandra

Senior career*
Years	Team	Apps	(Gls)
1946–1951	Chester	114	(1)
- Holywell Town
- * Club domestic league appearances and goals

Dave McNeil was an English professional footballer who played as a full back in the Football League for Chester.
