= Tommy Tilston =

English footballer

Personal information
- Full name: Thomas Arthur Anthony Tilston
- Date of birth: 19 February 1926
- Place of birth: Chester, England
- Date of death: 1997 (aged 70–71)
- Place of death: Southend-on-Sea, England
- Position: Inside forward

Youth career
- Chester

Senior career*
Years	Team	Apps	(Gls)
1949–1951	Chester	22	(7)
1951–1952	Tranmere Rovers	25	(15)
1951–1954	Wrexham	78	(29)
1953–1956	Crystal Palace	58	(13)
1956–	Chelmsford City		
Total		183	(64)
- * Club domestic league appearances and goals

Tommy Tilston (19 February 1926 – April 1997) was an English footballer, who played as an inside forward in the Football League for Chester, Tranmere Rovers, Wrexham, Crystal Palace and Chelmsford City.
