= Frank Hindle =

English footballer

Personal information
- Full name: Frank Johnston Hindle
- Date of birth: 22 June 1925
- Place of birth: Blackburn, England
- Date of death: 21 September 2013 (aged 88)
- Place of death: Newton Stewart, Scotland
- Position: Defender

Youth career
- 1943–1949: Blackburn Rovers

Senior career*
Years	Team	Apps	(Gls)
1949–1951	Chester	81	(0)
1951–1957	Bradford Park Avenue	204	(0)
Total		285	(0)
- * Club domestic league appearances and goals

Frank Johnston Hindle (22 June 1925 – 21 September 2013) was an English footballer, who played as a defender in the Football League for Chester and Bradford Park Avenue. He died in Newton Stewart, Scotland in September 2013 at the age of 88.
