= Reg Butcher =

English footballer

Personal information
- Full name: Reginald Butcher
- Date of birth: 13 February 1916
- Place of birth: Prescot, England
- Date of death: 3 October 2000 (aged 84)
- Place of death: Birkenhead, England
- Position: Full back

Youth career
- Liverpool

Senior career*
Years	Team	Apps	(Gls)
1938–1950	Chester	155	(1)
- * Club domestic league appearances and goals

Reg Butcher (13 February 1916 – 3 October 2000) was a footballer who played as a full back in the Football League for Chester.
