= Joe Davies (footballer, born 1926) =

English footballer

Personal information
- Full name: Joe Davies
- Date of birth: 30 January 1926
- Place of birth: Birkenhead, England
- Date of death: 12 June 1973 (aged 47)
- Place of death: Birkenhead, England
- Position: Winger

Senior career*
Years	Team	Apps	(Gls)
1947–1952	Chester	55	(10)
- * Club domestic league appearances and goals

Joe Davies (1926 – 1973) was an English footballer who played as a winger in the Football League for Chester.
