= Peter Greenwood (footballer) =

English footballer and cricketer (1924–2021)

Personal information
- Date of birth: 11 September 1924
- Place of birth: Todmorden, England
- Date of death: 30 November 2021 (aged 97)
- Position: Wing half

Senior career*
Years	Team	Apps	(Gls)
1948–1952	Chester	62	(3)
- * Club domestic league appearances and goals

Peter Greenwood (11 September 1924 – 30 November 2021) was an English footballer and cricketer. He played as a wing half in the Football League for Chester and also played for Lancashire County Cricket Club from 1947 to 1952.

Greenwood was born in Todmorden playing cricket for the town side, before serving as professional at Kendal in 1947 before being engaged by Lancashire for the next season. He appeared in 75 first-class matches as a righthanded batsman who bowled right arm off break and medium fast pace. He scored 1,270 runs with a highest score of 113 and held 21 catches. He took 208 wickets with a best analysis of six for 35.

After retiring from professional sport, Greenwood got a job working for Cheshire County Council. His wife of 56 years, Joan, died in 2007. Greenwood was interviewed about his career in 2009, at which point he was living in Upton-by-Chester. He died on 30 November 2021, at the age of 97.
