= Geoff Coffin =

English footballer (1924–2015)

Personal information
- Date of birth: 17 August 1924
- Place of birth: Chester, England
- Date of death: 12 March 2015 (aged 90)
- Place of death: Chester, England
- Position: Centre forward

Senior career*
Years	Team	Apps	(Gls)
–1947	Heath Rangers		
1947–1955	Chester	151	(35)
1955–????	Winsford United		
Total		151	(35)
- * Club domestic league appearances and goals

Geoff Coffin (17 August 1924 – 12 March 2015) was a footballer who played as a centre forward for Heath Rangers, Chester and Winsford United. He was born in Chester.
