= Roger Kirkpatrick =

English footballer

Personal information
- Full name: Roger Whitworth Kirkpatrick
- Date of birth: 29 May 1923
- Place of birth: Sculcoates, Hull, England
- Date of death: May 2013 (aged 89)
- Place of death: Stockport, England
- Position: Inside forward

Senior career*
Years	Team	Apps	(Gls)
1947–1953	Chester	111	(26)
- Altrincham
1954–1955	Macclesfield Town	31	(13)
Total		142	(39)
- * Club domestic league appearances and goals

Roger Whitworth Kirkpatrick (1923–2013) was a footballer who played as an inside forward in the Football League for Chester.
