= Cam Burgess =

English footballer (1919–1978)

Personal information
- Full name: Albert Campbell Burgess
- Date of birth: 21 September 1919
- Place of birth: Bebington, England
- Date of death: September 1978 (aged 58–59)
- Position: Forward

Senior career*
Years	Team	Apps	(Gls)
19??–1938	Bromborough		
1938–1948	Bolton Wanderers	5	(3)
1948–1951	Chester	111	(64)
1951–1953	Crystal Palace	47	(40)
1953–1954	York City	32	(14)
1954–19??	Runcorn		
Total		195	(121)
- * Club domestic league appearances and goals

Albert Campbell "Cam" Burgess (21 September 1919 – September 1978) was an English footballer who played as a forward. He played in the Football League for four clubs.

== Playing career ==
Burgess was born in Bebington, Cheshire. He began playing with non-league club Bromborough before joining Bolton Wanderers in February 1938, with his Football League First Division debut finally arriving against Brentford in May 1947. In October 1948 he moved to Chester, where he scored 64 league goals over the next three years to currently place him as the club's sixth highest Football League goalscorer.

Burgess was top scorer in two successive seasons with Crystal Palace before finishing his league career at York City. He then returned to non-league football with Runcorn and lived in Birkenhead until he died in September 1978.
