= 1946–47 Chester F.C. season =

Chester
1946–47 season
- Manager: Frank Brown
- Stadium: Sealand Road
- Football League Third Division North: 3rd
- FA Cup: Fourth round
- Welsh Cup: Winner
- Top goalscorer: League: Dick Yates (36); All: Dick Yates (43)
- Highest home attendance: 11,866 vs Wrexham (18 September)
- Lowest home attendance: 3,287 vs Accrington Stanley (29 March)
- Average home league attendance: 6,466; 16th in division
Home colours

The 1946–47 season was the ninth season of competitive association football in the Football League played by Chester, an English club based in Chester, Cheshire.

It was the club's ninth consecutive season in the Third Division North since the election to the Football League. Alongside competing in the league, the club also participated in the FA Cup and the Welsh Cup.

== Football League ==
Pos	Team	Pld	W	D	L	GF	GA	GAv	Pts	Promotion or relegation
1	Doncaster Rovers (C, P)	42	33	6	3	123	40	3.075	72	Promotion to the Second Division
2	Rotherham United	42	29	6	7	114	53	2.151	64	
3	Chester	42	25	6	11	95	51	1.863	56	
4	Stockport County	42	24	2	16	78	53	1.472	50	
5	Bradford City	42	20	10	12	62	47	1.319	50	

Source: rsssf.com
(C) Champions; (P) Promoted

=== Results summary ===
Overall								Home						Away					
Pld	W	D	L	GF	GA	GAv	Pts	W	D	L	GF	GA	Pts	W	D	L	GF	GA	Pts
42	25	6	11	95	51	1.863	56	17	2	2	53	13	36	8	4	9	42	38	20

Source: rsssf.com

=== Results by matchday ===
Round	1	2	3	4	5	6	7	8	9	10	11	12	13	14	15	16	17	18	19	20	21	22	23	24	25	26	27	28	29	30	31	32	33	34	35	36	37	38	39	40	41	42
Result	D	L	W	W	D	W	W	W	W	W	W	W	W	D	W	W	W	W	L	D	L	W	L	D	L	L	W	L	L	W	W	L	D	W	W	W	L	W	L	W	W	W
Position	11	16	9	6	8	5	4	2	2	2	2	2	2	2	2	2	2	2	2	2	2	2	2	3	3	4	3	3	4	4	4	4	4	4	4	3	3	3	3	3	3	3

Source: statto.com
W = Win; D = Draw; L = Loss

=== Matches ===
Date	Opponents	Venue	Result	Score	Scorers	Attendance
31 August	York City	A	D	4–4	Burden (2), Gledhill (o.g.), Hamilton	7,016
4 September	Doncaster Rovers	H	L	1–3	Burden	4,637
7 September	Tranmere Rovers	H	W	4–1	Lee, Arthur, Yates (2)	8,100
10 September	Southport	A	W	4–2	Burden, Astbury, Yates (2)	4,889
14 September	Darlington	A	D	3–3	Yates, Hamilton, Astbury	8,189
18 September	Wrexham	H	W	2–0	Burden, Yates	11,866
21 September	Hull City	H	W	5–1	Arthur, Hamilton, Burden (3)	7,766
25 September	Southport	H	W	2–1	Astbury, Yates	5,800
28 September	Gateshead	A	W	4–3	Burden (2), Astbury, Yates	4,842
5 October	Hartlepools United	H	W	2–1	Astbury, Yates	8,323
12 October	Crewe Alexandra	A	W	2–0	Yates, Burden	10,923
26 October	Stockport County	A	W	3–0	Yates, Hamilton, Astbury	11,738
2 November	Oldham Athletic	H	W	2–0	Yates, Burden	10,256
9 November	Bradford City	A	D	0–0		16,775
16 November	Barrow	H	W	3–0	Yates (2), Burden	7,877
23 November	Accrington Stanley	A	W	4–1	Arthur, Hamilton, Yates, Astbury	3,583
7 December	Halifax Town	A	W	2–1	Burden, Yates	3,830
14 December	New Brighton	H	W	2–1	Yates (2)	5,942
21 December	Rochdale	A	L	1–2	Yates	7,738
25 December	Rotherham United	H	D	2–2	Lee, Hamilton	9,096
26 December	Rotherham United	A	L	1–3	Burden	18,000
28 December	York City	H	W	6–0	Yates (3), Astbury (2), Selby	7,358
4 January	Tranmere Rovers	A	L	2–3	Yates, Burden	11,787
18 January	Darlington	H	D	1–1	Astbury	8,266
1 February	Gateshead	H	L	0–1		5,454
8 February	Hartlepools United	A	L	1–5	Yates	4,462
15 February	Crewe Alexandra	H	W	2–0	Astbury, Yates	3,953
6 March	Hull City	A	L	0–1		10,367
22 March	Barrow	A	L	0–1		5,509
29 March	Accrington Stanley	H	W	3–1	Burden (2), Hamilton	3,287
4 April	Lincoln City	H	W	3–0	Lee, Burden (2)	6,921
5 April	Carlisle United	A	L	2–3	Lee, Burden	6,810
7 April	Lincoln City	A	D	2–2	Yates, Burden	8,785
12 April	Halifax Town	H	W	2–0	Burden (2)	4,627
19 April	New Brighton	A	W	3–0	Hamilton, Yates (2)	7,006
26 April	Rochdale	H	W	1–0	Yates	4,278
3 May	Doncaster Rovers	A	L	0–3		17,015
10 May	Bradford City	H	W	3–0	Burden, Yates (pen.), Astbury	3,376
17 May	Oldham Athletic	A	L	0–1		7,378
24 May	Stockport County	H	W	3–0	Brown, Burden, Yates	4,563
26 May	Wrexham	A	W	4–0	Yates (3), Burden	18,746
31 May	Carlisle United	H	W	4–0	Yates (2, 1pen.), Lee, Burden	4,037

== FA Cup ==
Chester along with Cardiff City and Crystal Palace were given a bye to the Third round.

Round	Date	Opponents	Venue	Result	Score	Scorers	Attendance
Third round	11 January	Plymouth Argyle (2)	H	W	2–0	Astbury, Burden	18,000
Fourth round	25 January	Stoke City (1)	H	D	0–0		18,706
Fourth round replay	29 January	Stoke City (1)	A	L	2–3	Hamilton, Yates	22,683

== Welsh Cup ==
Round	Date	Opponents	Venue	Result	Score	Scorers	Attendance
Fifth round	15 January	Bangor City (LC)	A	W	5–3	Yates, Isherwood, Davies	
Quarterfinal	13 February	Swansea Town (2)	A	W	3–1	Yates, Astbury (2)	10,000
Semifinal	14 May	Newport County (2)	H	W	3–2	Burden, Yates, Astbury	7,000
Final	5 June	Merthyr Tydfil (SFL)	N	D	0–0		27,000
Final replay	12 June	Merthyr Tydfil (SFL)	N	W	5–1	Burden (2), Astbury, Yates, Turner	11,190

== Season statistics ==
Nat	Player	Total		League		FA Cup		Welsh Cup	
Nat	Player	A	G	A	G	A	G	A	G
Goalkeepers
(England)	Bill Rigby	1	–	1	–	–	–	–	–
(England)	George Scales	46	–	40	–	3	–	3	–
(Scotland)	Jimmy MacLaren	3	–	1	–	–	–	2	–
Field players
(England)	Jackie Arthur	27	3	24	3	2	–	1	–
(Wales)	Tommy Astbury	48	17	41	12	3	1	4	4
(England)	Joe Brown	2	1	2	1	–	–	–	–
(England)	Tommy Burden	48	32	42	28	3	1	3	3
	Reg Butcher	37	–	30	–	3	–	4	–
(England)	Doug Cole	15	–	13	–	–	–	2	–
	Maldwyn Davies	1	1	–	–	–	–	1	1
	Reg Dutton	1	–	–	–	–	–	1	–
(Wales)	Ken Ellis	1	–	1	–	–	–	–	–
(Wales)	Ivor Griffiths	1	–	1	–	–	–	–	–
	Bobby Hamilton	43	9	37	8	3	1	3	–
(England)	Charles Higgins	13	–	11	–	–	–	2	–
(England)	Dennis Isherwood	5	1	3	–	–	–	2	1
(Republic of Ireland)	Des Lacey	2	–	1	–	–	–	1	–
(England)	Eric Lee	44	5	38	5	3	–	3	–
(Wales)	Stan Leonard	1	–	1	–	–	–	–	–
(England)	Frank Marsh	45	–	38	–	3	–	4	–
(England)	Dave McNeil	36	–	30	–	3	–	3	–
	John Mills	4	–	3	–	–	–	1	–
(England)	Dennis Selby	6	1	5	1	1	–	–	–
	David Skinner	1	–	–	–	–	–	1	–
(England)	George Summerbee	10	–	9	–	–	–	1	–
	Phil Turner	11	1	8	–	–	–	3	1
(Wales)	Trevor Walters	47	–	40	–	3	–	4	–
(England)	Derek Williams	3	–	2	–	–	–	1	–
(Wales)	Dick Yates	48	43	40	36	3	1	5	6
	Own goals	–	1	–	1	–	–	–	–
	Total	50	115	42	95	3	4	5	16
