= 1947–48 Chester F.C. season =

Chester
1947–48 season
- Manager: Frank Brown
- Stadium: Sealand Road
- Football League Third Division North: 20th
- FA Cup: Fourth round
- Welsh Cup: Fifth round
- Top goalscorer: League: Tommy Burden (12); All: Tommy Burden (15)
- Highest home attendance: 16,160 vs Wrexham (28 February)
- Lowest home attendance: 3,881 vs Stockport County (24 April)
- Average home league attendance: 7,847; 14th in division
Home colours

The 1947–48 season was the tenth season of competitive association football in the Football League played by Chester, an English club based in Chester, Cheshire.

It was the club's tenth consecutive season in the Third Division North since the election to the Football League. Alongside competing in the league, the club also participated in the FA Cup and the Welsh Cup.

== Football League ==
Pos	Team	Pld	W	D	L	GF	GA	GAv	Pts	Promotion
18	Tranmere Rovers	42	16	4	22	54	72	0.750	36	
19	Hartlepools United	42	14	8	20	51	73	0.699	36	
20	Chester	42	13	9	20	64	67	0.955	35	
21	Halifax Town	42	7	13	22	43	76	0.566	27	Re-elected
22	New Brighton	42	8	9	25	38	81	0.469	25	Re-elected

Source: rsssf.com

=== Results summary ===
Overall								Home						Away					
Pld	W	D	L	GF	GA	GAv	Pts	W	D	L	GF	GA	Pts	W	D	L	GF	GA	Pts
42	13	9	20	64	67	0.955	35	11	6	4	44	25	28	2	3	16	20	42	7

Source: rsssf.com

=== Results by matchday ===
Round	1	2	3	4	5	6	7	8	9	10	11	12	13	14	15	16	17	18	19	20	21	22	23	24	25	26	27	28	29	30	31	32	33	34	35	36	37	38	39	40	41	42
Result	W	L	W	D	D	W	L	L	W	L	W	L	D	D	W	L	D	L	L	L	L	L	W	D	L	L	L	L	W	D	W	W	W	L	D	L	L	W	L	W	D	L
Position	4	10	10	8	9	5	8	11	9	10	9	10	11	9	8	10	10	10	13	16	17	17	17	17	17	18	18	19	19	18	18	17	17	17	17	18	19	19	19	19	18	20

Source: statto.com
W = Win; D = Draw; L = Loss

=== Matches ===
Date	Opponents	Venue	Result	Score	Scorers	Attendance
23 August	Oldham Athletic	H	W	2–1	Yates, Best	8,505
28 August	Barrow	A	L	0–1		10,293
30 August	Tranmere Rovers	A	W	3–2	Colville, Burden, Astbury	11,950
3 September	Barrow	H	D	0–0		7,751
6 September	Darlington	H	D	1–1	Astbury	7,948
10 September	Crewe Alexandra	H	W	4–2	Best, Marsh (pen.), Turner, Burden	8,300
13 September	Gateshead	A	L	1–2	Burden	5,987
17 September	Crewe Alexandra	A	L	0–1		9,124
20 September	Hartlepools United	H	W	2–0	Turner, Hamilton	7,148
27 September	Rotherham United	A	L	1–2	Turner	14,262
4 October	Carlisle United	H	W	4–1	Geoff Coffin, Astbury (2), Burden	7,910
11 October	Wrexham	A	L	1–2	Marsh	21,131
18 October	Halifax Town	H	D	0–0		6,402
25 October	Rochdale	A	D	2–2	Turner, Best	9,582
1 November	New Brighton	H	W	4–2	Astbury (2), Burden (2)	7,733
8 November	Southport	A	L	0–3		8,702
15 November	Lincoln City	H	D	1–1	Best	7,849
22 November	Accrington Stanley	A	L	0–1		3,660
6 December	Stockport County	A	L	1–4	Monks (o.g.)	9,630
20 December	Oldham Athletic	A	L	1–3	Williamson (pen.)	11,807
26 December	York City	A	L	0–2		10,435
27 December	York City	H	L	2–3	Westwood, Astbury	8,754
3 January	Tranmere Rovers	H	W	4–0	Astbury, Brown, Burden (2)	8,721
17 January	Darlington	A	D	1–1	Westwood	6,816
31 January	Gateshead	H	L	2–3	Turner, Burden	6,721
7 February	Hartlepools United	A	L	1–2	Astbury	6,353
14 February	Rotherham United	H	L	2–3	Astbury, Butcher	9,994
21 February	Carlisle United	A	L	0–2		11,720
28 February	Wrexham	H	W	4–1	Best, Westwood, Williamson (2)	16,160
6 March	Halifax Town	A	D	1–1	Kirkpatrick	7,256
13 March	Rochdale	H	W	2–1	Westwood, Kirkpatrick	6,427
17 March	Hull City	H	W	4–1	Best, Burden (2), Kirkpatrick	6,087
20 March	New Brighton	A	W	1–0	Best	4,806
26 March	Mansfield Town	H	L	1–2	Best	11,209
27 March	Southport	H	D	0–0		7,366
29 March	Mansfield Town	A	L	1–2	Burden	12,770
3 April	Lincoln City	A	L	2–4	Hamilton, Westwood	13,066
10 April	Accrington Stanley	H	W	1–0	Best	5,811
17 April	Hull City	A	L	1–2	Turner	24,138
21 April	Bradford City	H	W	2–1	Westwood (2)	4,604
24 April	Stockport County	H	D	2–2	Davies, Westwood	3,881
1 May	Bradford City	A	L	2–3	Best, Astbury	3,774

== FA Cup ==
Round	Date	Opponents	Venue	Result	Score	Scorers	Attendance
First round	29 November	Bishop Auckland (NFL)	H	W	3–1	Yates (2), Burden	8,300
Second round	13 December	Tranmere Rovers (3N)	A	W	1–0	Burden	14,132
Third round	10 January	Crystal Palace (3S)	A	W	1–0	Burden	22,084
Fourth round	24 January	Blackpool (1)	A	L	0–4		26,414

== Welsh Cup ==
Round	Date	Opponents	Venue	Result	Score	Scorers	Attendance
Fifth round	14 January	South Liverpool (CCL)	A	L	1–2	Brown	

== Season statistics ==
Nat	Player	Total		League		FA Cup		Welsh Cup	
Nat	Player	A	G	A	G	A	G	A	G
Goalkeepers
	George Scales	22	–	20	–	2	–	–	–
	Jimmy MacLaren	25	–	22	–	2	–	1	–
Field players
(Wales)	Tommy Astbury	37	11	33	11	3	–	1	–
(Wales)	Tommy Best	32	10	30	10	1	–	1	–
(England)	Joe Brown	16	2	13	1	2	–	1	1
(England)	Tommy Burden	44	15	40	12	4	3	–	–
	Reg Butcher	46	1	42	1	4	–	–	–
	Doug Cole	8	–	7	–	–	–	1	–
	Geoff Coffin	5	1	3	1	1	–	1	–
(Scotland)	Harry Colville	6	1	4	1	2	–	–	–
(England)	Joe Davies	3	1	3	1	–	–	–	–
	Bobby Hamilton	36	2	31	2	4	–	1	–
	Roger Kirkpatrick	11	3	10	3	–	–	1	–
(England)	Eric Lee	19	–	15	–	4	–	–	–
(England)	Frank Marsh	32	2	31	2	–	–	1	–
	Dave McNeil	43	–	39	–	4	–	–	–
	Phil Turner	19	6	19	6	–	–	–	–
	Trevor Walters	35	–	33	–	1	–	1	–
(England)	Raymond Westwood	18	8	16	8	2	–	–	–
	Fred Wilcox	20	–	16	–	3	–	1	–
(England)	George Williamson	27	3	23	3	4	–	–	–
(Wales)	Dick Yates	13	3	12	1	1	2	–	–
	Own goals	–	1	–	1	–	–	–	–
	Total	47	70	42	64	4	5	1	1
