= 1956–57 Chester F.C. season =

Chester
1956–57 season
- Manager: John Harris
- Stadium: Sealand Road
- Football League Third Division North: 21st
- FA Cup: First round
- Welsh Cup: Semifinal
- Top goalscorer: League: Billy Foulkes (11); All: Billy Foulkes and Barry Jepson (11)
- Highest home attendance: 12,192 vs Derby County (22 August)
- Lowest home attendance: 2,691 vs Scunthorpe & Lindsey United (23 February)
- Average home league attendance: 6,472; 15th in division
Home colours

The 1956–57 season was the 19th season of competitive association football in the Football League played by Chester, an English club based in Chester, Cheshire.

It was the club's 19th consecutive season in the Third Division North since the election to the Football League. Alongside competing in the league, the club also participated in the FA Cup and the Welsh Cup.

== Football League ==
Pos	Team	Pld	W	D	L	GF	GA	GAv	Pts	Promotion or relegation
19	Oldham Athletic	46	12	15	19	66	74	0.892	39	
20	Bradford (Park Avenue)	46	16	3	27	66	93	0.710	35	
21	Chester	46	10	13	23	55	84	0.655	33	
22	Southport	46	10	12	24	52	94	0.553	32	
23	Tranmere Rovers	46	7	13	26	51	91	0.560	27	Re-elected

Source: rsssf.com

=== Results summary ===
Overall								Home						Away					
Pld	W	D	L	GF	GA	GAv	Pts	W	D	L	GF	GA	Pts	W	D	L	GF	GA	Pts
46	10	13	23	55	84	0.655	33	8	7	8	40	35	23	2	6	15	15	49	10

Source: rsssf.com

=== Results by matchday ===
Round	1	2	3	4	5	6	7	8	9	10	11	12	13	14	15	16	17	18	19	20	21	22	23	24	25	26	27	28	29	30	31	32	33	34	35	36	37	38	39	40	41	42	43	44	45	46
Result	D	D	L	L	L	L	L	L	L	W	L	L	L	W	L	W	L	W	L	L	D	D	D	D	L	D	L	L	W	L	D	D	D	L	D	W	D	L	L	W	L	D	W	W	L	W
Position	10	10	19	21	24	24	24	23	24	22	23	23	24	21	22	21	21	21	21	21	21	21	21	21	21	21	21	22	21	21	21	21	21	21	21	21	21	22	22	22	22	23	22	21	21	21

Source: statto.com
W = Win; D = Draw; L = Loss

=== Matches ===
Date	Opponents	Venue	Result	Score	Scorers	Attendance
18 August	Wrexham	A	D	2–2	Bullock, Allman	13,506
22 August	Derby County	H	D	2–2	Foulkes (2)	12,192
25 August	Hartlepools United	H	L	0–1		8,374
29 August	Derby County	A	L	0–3		20,037
1 September	Bradford City	A	L	0–1		14,244
5 September	Chesterfield	A	L	0–3		7,901
8 September	Stockport County	H	L	1–4	Whitlock	9,948
12 September	Chesterfield	H	L	3–4	Harris, Hansell, Fields	5,404
15 September	Carlisle United	A	L	0–3		6,306
17 September	York City	A	W	1–0	Foulkes (pen.)	9,234
22 September	Accrington Stanley	H	L	0–2		8,850
26 September	York City	H	L	3–4	Bullock, Williams, Hansell	4,258
29 September	Tranmere Rovers	A	L	1–3	Hansell	6,982
6 October	Crewe Alexandra	H	W	4–1	Foulkes (2), Hansell, Bullock	6,653
13 October	Scunthorpe & Lindsey United	A	L	0–3		6,377
20 October	Bradford Park Avenue	H	W	2–0	Foulkes, Hansell	5,385
27 October	Halifax Town	A	L	1–2	Mulholland	4,982
3 November	Workington	H	W	1–0	Hansell	6,654
10 November	Hull City	A	L	0–2		8,571
24 November	Darlington	A	L	1–5	Davies (pen.)	4,097
1 December	Rochdale	H	D	2–2	Davies (pen.), Hansell	5,492
15 December	Wrexham	H	D	0–0		10,066
22 December	Hartlepools United	A	D	2–2	Bullock (2)	6,515
25 December	Oldham Athletic	A	D	0–0		7,524
29 December	Bradford City	H	L	1–2	Foulkes	7,330
5 January	Mansfield Town	A	D	1–1	Hansell	5,999
12 January	Stockport County	A	L	1–2	Hansell	8,958
19 January	Carlisle United	H	L	1–2	Turner	6,533
26 January	Mansfield Town	H	W	6–2	Jepson (3), Turner (2), Foulkes	5,681
2 February	Accrington Stanley	A	L	0–4		6,661
9 February	Tranmere Rovers	H	D	1–1	Davies (pen.)	7,625
16 February	Crewe Alexandra	A	D	0–0		6,536
23 February	Scunthorpe & Lindsey United	H	D	2–2	Jepson (2)	2,691
2 March	Bradford Park Avenue	A	L	1–3	Smith	7,547
9 March	Halifax Town	H	D	1–1	Jepson	5,098
16 March	Workington	A	W	1–0	Jepson	10,414
23 March	Hull City	H	D	1–1	Jepson	6,272
30 March	Barrow	A	L	0–3		4,069
6 April	Darlington	H	L	0–3		4,786
10 April	Oldham Athletic	H	W	1–0	Smith	3,416
13 April	Rochdale	A	L	1–2	Jepson	4,501
19 April	Southport	A	D	1–1	Bullock	5,216
20 April	Gateshead	H	W	4–1	Oldham (o.g.), Foulkes (2), Davies	5,545
22 April	Southport	H	W	2–0	Jepson, Foulkes	6,749
27 April	Gateshead	A	L	1–4	Smith	2,599
29 April	Barrow	H	W	2–0	Williams, Bullock	3,849

== FA Cup ==
Round	Date	Opponents	Venue	Result	Score	Scorers	Attendance
First round	17 November	Barrow (3N)	H	D	0–0		8,311
First round replay	22 November	Barrow (3N)	A	L	1–3	Turner	4,052

== Welsh Cup ==
Round	Date	Opponents	Venue	Result	Score	Scorers	Attendance
Fifth round	31 January	Oswestry Town (B&DL)	A	W	3–0	Bullock (2), Smith	1,095
Quarterfinal	27 February	Cardiff City (1)	A	W	2–0	Davies	5,000
Semifinal	20 March	Wrexham (3N)	N	L	0–2		

== Season statistics ==
Nat	Player	Total		League		FA Cup		Welsh Cup	
Nat	Player	A	G	A	G	A	G	A	G
Goalkeepers
(England)	Bobby Jones	51	–	46	–	2	–	3	–
Field players
(England)	George Allman	11	1	10	1	1	–	–	–
	Norman Bullock	48	9	43	7	2	–	3	2
	Jim Collins	5	–	5	–	–	–	–	–
(England)	George Davies	36	5	33	4	–	–	3	1
	Mike Fields	14	1	13	1	–	–	1	–
(Wales)	Billy Foulkes	46	11	42	11	2	–	2	–
(England)	Ray Gill	47	–	42	–	2	–	4	–
	Ray Griffiths	9	–	9	–	–	–	–	–
	Bernard Hackett	4	–	4	–	–	–	–	–
(England)	Jack Haines	7	–	5	–	2	–	–	–
	Ron Hansell	40	9	36	9	1	–	3	–
(Scotland)	John Harris	29	1	27	1	2	–	–	–
(Wales)	Ron Hughes	44	–	39	–	2	–	3	–
	Barry Jepson	20	11	18	10	–	–	2	1
	Gavin Lang	3	–	3	–	–	–	–	–
(England)	Eric Lee	12	–	12	–	–	–	–	–
	Sam Morris	39	–	34	–	2	–	3	–
	John Mulholland	9	1	8	1	–	–	1	–
	Les Owen	1	–	1	–	–	–	–	–
(England)	Harry Smith	15	4	13	3	–	–	2	1
	Phil Turner	19	4	16	3	2	1	1	–
	Phil Whitlock	33	1	30	1	2	–	1	–
(England)	Bobby Williams	19	2	17	2	–	–	2	–
	Own goals	–	1	–	1	–	–	–	–
	Total	51	61	46	55	2	1	3	5
