= Charles Higgins =

Charles or Charlie Higgins may refer to:

- Charles Higgins (footballer) (1921–1997), Scottish footballer
- Charles Longuet Higgins (1806–1885), English landowner, physician and benefactor
- Charles M. Higgins (1854–1929), Irish-American ink manufacturer and anti-vaccinationist
- Charles Hayes Higgins (1811–1898), British surgeon and medical author
- Charlie Higgins (fiddler) (1878–1967), American old time fiddle player
- Charlie Higgins (comedian) (1892–1978), British comedian
- Charlie Higgins (Gaelic footballer) (fl. 1950s), Irish Gaelic footballer
- Chuck Higgins (1924–1999), American saxophonist
- Vannie Higgins (Charles Higgins, 1897–1932), New York mobster and bootlegger
