= Derek Williams =

Derek Williams may refer to:

== Sports ==
=== Association football ===
- Derek Williams (footballer, born 1922) (1922–2019), English footballer for Chester City
- Derek Williams (footballer, born 1934) (1934–2014), Welsh footballer
- Derek Williams (footballer, born 1937) (1937–2015), English footballer for Grimsby Town

=== Other sports ===
- Derek Williams (boxer) (born 1965), English heavyweight boxer of the 1980s and 1990s
- Derek Williams (sportsman) (1924–2014), former Welsh international rugby union player and first-class cricketer

== The arts ==
- Derek Williams (musician) (1952–), British composer, conductor, orchestrator
- Derek Williams (filmmaker) (1929–2021), British documentary film director and writer
- Derek Williams (art collector) (1929–1984), Welsh collector of modern art

== See also ==
- Derrick Williams (disambiguation)
