= Dick Yates =

Welsh footballer

Personal information
- Full name: Richard Yates
- Date of birth: 6 June 1921
- Place of birth: Queensferry, Flintshire, Wales
- Date of death: 1976 (aged 54–55)
- Height: 5 ft 11 in (1.80 m)
- Position: Centre-forward

Senior career*
Years	Team	Apps	(Gls)
1946–1947	Chester	52	(37)
1947–1948	Wrexham	31	(18)
1948–1949	Carlisle United	16	(9)
1949–1951	New Brighton	43	(14)
- South Liverpool
Total		142+	(76+)
- * Club domestic league appearances and goals

Richard Yates (6 June 1921 – 1976) was a Welsh footballer who spent six years immediately after World War II playing centre-forward in the Football League for Chester, Wrexham, Carlisle United, and New Brighton.

== Career ==
Yates played as a guest for Wrexham, Reading, Charlton Athletic and Port Vale during World War II. After the war he signed with Frank Brown's Chester, and with 36 goals in the 1946–47 season he set a club record that was never equalled. Despite his efforts, the "Seals" could only finish third in the Third Division North and were not promoted. He left Sealand Road in the 1947–48 season and scored 18 goals in 31 league games for Wrexham, who also finished third in the Third Division North. He scored hat-tricks against Halifax Town in the league and against Penrhyn Quarry in the Welsh Cup. He departed the Racecourse Ground, and switched to league rivals Carlisle United. He scored nine goals in 16 league games in the 1948–49 campaign for Ivor Broadis's "Cumbrians" in what was a brief stay at Brunton Park. He moved on to New Brighton for the 1949–50 season before leaving the club after they failed to gain re-election in 1950–51. Despite boasting a goal ratio of one goal for every two games, he never found another club in the Football League. Instead, he ended his career with South Liverpool.

== Career statistics ==
Appearances and goals by club, season and competition
Club	Season	League			FA Cup		Total	
Club	Season	Division	Apps	Goals	Apps	Goals	Apps	Goals
Chester	1945–46		0	0	2	0	2	0
Chester	1946–47	Third Division North	40	36	3	1	43	37
Chester	1947–48	Third Division North	12	1	1	2	13	3
Chester	Total		52	37	6	3	58	40
Wrexham	1947–48	Third Division North	21	13	0	0	21	13
Wrexham	1948–49	Third Division North	10	5	0	0	10	5
Wrexham	Total		31	18	0	0	31	18
Carlisle United	1948–49	Third Division North	16	9	1	0	17	9
New Brighton	1949–50	Third Division North	38	13	1	0	39	13
New Brighton	1950–51	Third Division North	5	1	0	0	5	1
New Brighton	Total		43	14	1	0	44	14
