= John Mulholland =

John Mulholland may refer to:

- John Mulholland, 1st Baron Dunleath (1819–1895), Irish businessman and Conservative member of parliament
- John F. Mulholland Jr. (born 1955), United States Army officer
- John Mulholland (footballer, born 1928) (1928–2015), Scottish footballer (Grimsby Town, Scunthorpe United)
- John Mulholland (footballer, born 1932) (1932–2000), Scottish footballer (Chester FC, Halifax Town)
- John Mulholland (Irish republican), president of the Irish Republican Brotherhood, 1910–1912
- John Mulholland (journalist) (born 1962), editor of The Guardian US
- John Mulholland (director) (born 1940), American writer and director
- John Mulholland (magician) (1898–1970), American magician
- John Henry Mulholland, Liberal candidate in the 1962 Stockton-on-Tees by-election and father of Greg Mulholland MP
