= Ferryhill Athletic F.C. =

English association football club

Ferryhill Athletic
- Full name: Ferryhill Athletic Football Club
- Nickname: The Athletic
- Founded: 1921; 2021
- Dissolved: 2006
- Ground: Dean Bank Recreation Park, Ferryhill, DL17 8PS
- Chairman: Chris Orton
- Manager: Kieron Richardson
- Coach: Paul Gillham, Mickey Seymour, Geoff Hugill
- League: Wearside League Division 1
Home colours	Away colours	Third colours

Ferryhill Athletic Football Club is an amateur association football club based in Ferryhill, County Durham, England. They are currently member of Wearside Football League, the eleventh tier of English football, and play at Dean Bank Recreation Ground.

The club was founded in 1921, and were the first competitive opponent of Sunderland. They joined the Palatine League and defeated Evenwood Town 5–1 in their first-ever league match and also won the Durham Amateur Cup after defeating Lambton Star in the finals. In 1923–24 they were elected to join Northern Football League and finished second in their inaugural league season and won Durham Challenge Cup.

== History ==
=== Original club (1921–2006) ===
In 1925–26, they competed in the FA Amateur Cup and reached quarter-finals, where they lost 4–1 to St Albans City In 1930–31 season, they finished they finished last in the league. After two consecutive eight place finish in 1935–36 and 1936–37 season, they won the league in 1937–38 season. During 1939–40 season, Ferryhill, along with Whitby Town, Evenwood Town, Cockfield, Brandon Social and Billingham, resigned from the league.

After World War II, when football league suspension was over, Ferryhill rejoined the Northern Football League and finished eleventh out of twelve. They won the league again in 1947–48. In 1953–54 FA Cup qualifying round, they defeated Skinnigrove Works 18–0, which is the biggest post-war victory in the FA Cup.

The original club folded in 2006 following a number of years of decline and the loss of their Darlington Road stadium.

=== New club (2021–present) ===
In 2021, a new team called Durham F.C. were formed and admitted to the Wearside Football League, the eleventh tier of English football. In January 2022, after struggling to find a home in Durham, they moved to Dean Bank Recreation Park in Ferryhill and adopted the name and colours of Ferryhill Athletic, resurrecting the old club.

The club built steadily and made good progreess, and in the 2023–2024 season Athletic won the Clem Smith Bowl, defeating Durham City 4–1 on penalties at Dean Bank Park. In 2025–2026 the club won the Wearside League Division 1 and were promoted to the Wearside Premier League for the following season. This was the club's first promotion in its 105-year history and means that they will compete at Step 7 of the National League System.

The current club retains on its crest a wild boar—a symbol of the town which was said to have been the place where one of the last wild boars in Britain, known as the Brawn of Brancepeth, was killed by Sir Roger de Ferye in c. 1208.

The club's kits and training gear is made by local company Avec Sport, with the home kit sponsored by Durham Precision Engineering and the away kit sponsored by TMC Lean Engineering.

=== Committee ===
Position	Name
Chairman	Chris Orton
Vice-chair	Alex Graham
Secretary	Jeff Spooner
Welfare officer	Alex Graham
Treasurer	Marco Linhart
Club historian	Geoff Wall
Committee members	Kevin Waite, Keith Stayman

Information correct as of 5 May 2026

=== Management ===
Position	Name
Player manager	Kieron Richardson
Assistant manager	Paul Gillham
Assistant manager	Mickey Seymour
Goalkeeping coach	Geoff Hugill

Information correct as of 5 May 2026

== Records ==
- Best FA Cup performance: First round, 1935–36, 1953–54
- Best FA Trophy performance: Second qualifying round, 1980–81, 1981–82 (replay), 1982–83, 1989–90 (replay), 1990–91
- Best FA Vase performance: First round, 1996–97
- Best FA Amateur Cup performance: Quarter-finals, 1925–26, 1963–64
- Clem Smith Bowl Winners 2023–2024
- Wearside League Division 1 Champions 2025–2026

== Honours ==
Ferryhill Athletic's honours
Competition	Position	Titles	Season
Northern League	Champions	3	1937–38, 1947–48, 1957–58
Northern League	Runners-up	1	1923–24
Durham Challenge Cup	Champions	2	1923–24, 1970–71
Clem Smith Bowl	Champions	1	2023–24
Wearside League Division 1	Champions	1	2025–2026

== See also ==
- Category:Ferryhill Athletic F.C. players
