= Harry Cassidy (Gaelic footballer) =

Northern Irish Gaelic football player and manager (1930–2023)

Personal information
- Native name: Anraí Ó Caiside (Irish)
- Born: 10 May 1930 Bellaghy, County Londonderry, Northern Ireland
- Died: 31 March 2023 (aged 92) Portglenone, County Londonderry, Northern Ireland
- Occupation: Businessman

Sport
- Sport: Gaelic Football
- Position: Centre-back
Club
- Years: Club
- Bellaghy
Club titles
- Derry titles: 5
Inter-county
- Years: County
- 1952-1959: Derry
Inter-county titles
- Ulster titles: 1
- All-Irelands: 0
- NFL: 0

Henry Cassidy (10 May 1930 – 31 March 2023) was an Irish Gaelic football player and manager. He played with, and later managed, club side Bellaghy and the Derry senior football team.

== Career ==
Cassidy first played Gaelic football at club level with Bellaghy. He was centre-back on Bellaghy's first-ever Derry SFC-winning team in 1956, and was also part of the club's four-in-a-row success from 1958 to 1961. Cassidy first appeared on the inter-county scene as a member of the Derry senior football team. He was part of the team's Ulster SFC-winning campaign in 1958 and was also an unused substitute when Derry were beaten by Dublin in the 1958 All-Ireland final.

== Post-playing career ==
Cassidy became involved in team management and coaching when his playing days had ended. He guided his home club of Bellaghy to four consecutive Derry SFC titles, as well as two Ulster Club SFC titles before beating University College Cork in the 1972 All-Ireland club final. Cassidy's success at club level resulted in two subsequent stints as Derry manager. He also served as Bellaghy club chairman for over 30 years across three different terms.

== Death ==
Cassidy died on 31 March 2023, at the age of 92.

== Honours ==
=== Player ===
Bellaghy

- Derry Senior Football Championship: 1956, 1958, 1959, 1960, 1961

Derry

- Ulster Senior Football Championship: 1958

=== Management ===
Bellaghy

- All-Ireland Senior Club Football Championship: 1972
- Ulster Senior Club Football Championship: 1968, 1971
- Derry Senior Football Championship: 1968, 1969, 1971, 1972

Sporting positions
Preceded by Paddy O'Hara	Derry senior football team manager 1971–1974	Succeeded by Frank Kearney
Preceded by Frank Kearney	Derry senior football team manager 1979–1980	Succeeded by Mickey Moran
