= 1958 All-Ireland Senior Football Championship final =

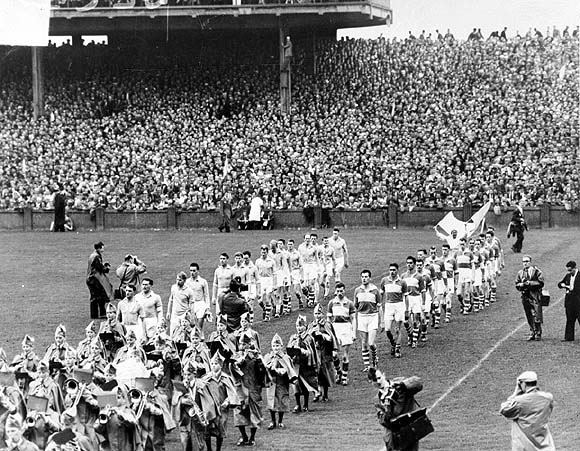
- Event: 1958 All-Ireland Senior Football Championship
Dublin	Derry
2–12 (18)	1–9 (12)
- Date: 28 September 1958
- Venue: Croke Park, Dublin
- Referee: Simon Deignan (Cavan)
- Attendance: 73,371

The 1958 All-Ireland Senior Football Championship final was the 71st All-Ireland Final and the deciding match of the 1958 All-Ireland Senior Football Championship, an inter-county Gaelic football tournament for the top teams in Ireland.

== Match ==
=== Summary ===
Dublin won comfortably over Derry, appearing in their first final, with goals by Owen Gribben and Paddy Farnan.

=== Details ===
September 28, 1958

Dublin	2-12 – 1-9	Derry
O. Freaney 0-7, K. Hefferan 0-3, P. Franan 1-1, J. Joyce 1-0 & J. Timmons 0-1.		S. O'Connell 0-5, O. Gribbin 1-1, B. Mullan, D. McKeever & J. McKeever 0-1.

Croke Park, Dublin
Attendance: 73,371
Referee: Simon Deignan (Cavan)

Dublin

- 1 P. O'Flaherty
- 2 L. Foley
- 3 M. Wilson
- 4 Joe Timmons
- 5 C. O'Leary
- 6 J. Crowley
- 7 J. Boyle
- 8 John Timmons
- 9 S. Murray
- 10 P. Haughey
- 11 O. Freaney
- 12 D. Ferguson
- 13 P. Farnan
- 14 J. Joyce
- 15 K. Heffernan (c)

Subs used
16 M. Whelan for S. Murray
18 P. Downey for John Timmons

Subs not used
17 J. Brennan
19 B. Morris
20 C. Leaney
21 T. Gillen
22 D. McCann

Trainer
P. O'Reilly

Derry

- 1 P. Gormley
- 2 P. McLarnon
- 3 H. F. Gribben
- 4 T. Doherty
- 5 P. Breen
- 6 C. Mulholland
- 7 P. Smith
- 8 J. McKeever (c)
- 9 P. Stuart
- 10 S. O'Connell
- 11 B. Murray
- 12 D. McKeever
- 13 B. Mullan
- 14 O. Gribben
- 15 C. Higgins

Subs used
18 R. Gribben (player-manager) for Higgins
19 L. O'Neill for Mullan
17 C. O'Neill for Breen

Other subs
16 H. Cassidy
20 W. Cassidy
#? T. Scullion
#? S. Young
#? L. Mulholland
#? T. J. Doherty

Player-manager
R. Gribben

== Legacy ==
Players from both teams involved in the game had a golden jubilee reunion in 2008, organised with the help of Dublin's 1970s footballers such as Alan Larkin.
