= Bill Rigby =

William, Will or Bill Rigby may refer to:

- Will Rigby (footballer) (1906–1977), English footballer for Wigan Borough, Stockport County and Rochdale, see List of Rochdale A.F.C. players (25–99 appearances)
- Bill Rigby (footballer) (1921–2010), former English footballer
- Bill Rigby (politician) (1923–2003), Australian politician
- Will Rigby (b. 1956), American musician
