= Frank Marsh (footballer) =

English footballer

Personal information
- Full name: Frank Kitchener Marsh
- Date of birth: 7 June 1916
- Place of birth: Bolton, England
- Date of death: 1978 (aged 61–62)
- Position: Half-back

Senior career*
Years	Team	Apps	(Gls)
- Stafford Rangers
1937–1938	Crewe Alexandra	0	(0)
1938–1939	Bolton Wanderers	3	(0)
1939–1949	Chester	69	(2)
1949–1951	Macclesfield Town	77	(12)
Total		149+	(14+)
- * Club domestic league appearances and goals

Frank Kitchener Marsh (7 June 1916 – 1978) was an English footballer who played at half-back for Stafford Rangers, Crewe Alexandra, Bolton Wanderers, Chester, and Macclesfield Town.

== Career ==
Marsh played for Stafford Rangers, Crewe Alexandra, Bolton Wanderers and Chester, also guesting for Lincoln City, Grimsby Town, Rochdale and Port Vale during the war. After the war he made 69 Third Division North appearances for Frank Brown's Chester between in the 1946–47 and 1947–48 seasons, before leaving Sealand Road and moving on to Cheshire County League side Macclesfield Town in January 1949. At Macclesfield he replaced James Quinn at right-half. He moved to centre-half towards the end of the 1949–50 season and only missed one match, scoring 10 goals. He was captain during the 1950–51 season.

== Career statistics ==
Appearances and goals by club, season and competition
Club	Season	League			FA Cup		Total	
Club	Season	Division	Apps	Goals	Apps	Goals	Apps	Goals
Crewe Alexandra	1937–38	Third Division North	0	0	0	0	0	0
Bolton Wanderers	1938–39	First Division	3	0	0	0	3	0
Chester	1945–46		0	0	2	0	2	0
Chester	1946–47	Third Division North	38	0	3	0	41	0
Chester	1947–48	Third Division North	31	2	0	0	31	2
Chester	Total		69	2	5	0	74	2
