= George Davies (footballer, born 1927) =

English footballer (1927–2025)

Personal information
- Date of birth: 1 March 1927
- Place of birth: Rednal, England
- Date of death: 9 February 2025 (aged 97)
- Position: Wing half

Youth career
- Llanymynech

Senior career*
Years	Team	Apps	(Gls)
1946–1950	Oswestry Town		
1950–1956	Sheffield Wednesday	98	(1)
1956–1957	Chester	35	(4)
1957–1958	Wellington Town		
- * Club domestic league appearances and goals

George Davies (1 March 1927 – 9 February 2025) was an English professional footballer who played as a wing half. He played in the Football League for Sheffield Wednesday and Chester in the 1950s.

== Career ==
Davies played for village side Llanymynech before spending four years with Oswestry Town. In June 1950 he moved to Sheffield Wednesday for £250, with his six years at Hillsborough including an appearance in the FA Cup semi–finals against Preston North End in 1953–54 at Maine Road.

After nearly 100 league appearances for Wednesday, Davies moved to Third Division North side Chester ahead of 1956–57, in a summer in which new manager John Harris also recruited Billy Foulkes, Ron Hansell and John Mulholland as a wave of enthusiasm gripped the club. Davies went on to score in a shock Welsh Cup victory over First Division side Cardiff City later in the campaign and also scored four league goals but he managed just two league appearances early the following season and joined Wellington Town, where he spent one season. After leaving football, Davies went on to work as a window cleaner in Chester.

Although he had a reputation as tough tackling player, Davies was never booked or sent off throughout his career.

== Death ==
Davies, a baker by trade who later ran a window cleaning business after retiring from play, died on 9 February 2025, at the age of 97.

== Honours ==
Sheffield Wednesday

- Football League Second Division: 1951–52

== Bibliography ==
- Sumner, Chas (1997). On the Borderline: The Official History of Chester City F.C. 1885-1997. Yore Publications. ISBN 1-874427-52-6.
