= Paddy Farnan =

Irish Gaelic footballer

Paddy Farnon
Personal information
- Native name: Pádraig Ó Farannáin (Irish)
- Born: 1936 Dublin, Ireland
- Died: 1991 (aged 54–55)
- Occupation: Clerk
- Height: 5 ft 9 in (175 cm)

Sport
- Sport: Gaelic football
- Position: Right corner-forward
Club
- Years: Club
- St. Vincent's
Inter-county
- Years: County
- 1953-1958: Dublin
Inter-county titles
- Leinster titles: 2
- All-Irelands: 1
- NFL: 1

Patrick Farnan (born 1936) is an Irish retired Gaelic footballer who played for club side St. Vincent's and at inter-county level with the Dublin senior football team.

== Career ==
Farnan was a product of St. Joseph's CBS and won All-Ireland medals as a dual player in 1954 as the Dublin minor teams completed the double after defeats of Tipperary and Kerry. His development at club level with St. Vincent's saw him drafted onto the Dublin junior team in 1958, however, he was subsequently promoted to the senior team and enjoyed a successful season by claiming National League and Leinster Championship titles. Farnan's lined out at right corner-forward for Dublin's 1958 All-Ireland final defeat of Derry. He ended his career by winning a second provincial title.

== Honours ==
Dublin

- All-Ireland Senior Football Championship: 1958
- Leinster Senior Football Championship: 1958, 1959
- National Football League: 1957-58
- All-Ireland Minor Football Championship: 1954
- Leinster Minor Football Championship: 1954
- All-Ireland Minor Hurling Championship: 1954
- Leinster Minor Hurling Championship: 1954
