= Tommy Doherty (Gaelic footballer) =

Gaelic footballer

Tommy Doherty is an Irish former Gaelic footballer who played in the 1958 All-Ireland Final. He was called Wee Tommy. He did a fatal slip in the game.

He was with his Lavey teammate Colm Mulholland for the game.
