= Bill Rigby (footballer) =

English footballer

Personal information
- Full name: William Rigby
- Date of birth: 9 June 1921
- Place of birth: Chester, England
- Date of death: 1 June 2010 (aged 88)
- Place of death: Greasby, England
- Position: Goalkeeper

Youth career
- Chester

Senior career*
Years	Team	Apps	(Gls)
1939–1947	Chester	1	(0)
- * Club domestic league appearances and goals

William Rigby (9 June 1921 – 1 June 2010) was an English footballer who played as a goalkeeper. He was born in Chester.

A product of the youth system at his hometown club of Chester, Rigby made his only peacetime first-team appearance for the club in their first post-war match in The Football League in a 4–4 draw at York City on 31 August 1946. After this he was not selected again, with goalkeeping duties being passed on to George Scales and Jimmy MacLaren.

Earlier he had made appearances for the first-team during the war years, mainly during 1940–41 and 1941–42 while understudy to Bill Shortt.

== Bibliography ==
- Sumner, Chas (1997). On the Borderline: The Official History of Chester City F.C. 1885-1997. Yore Publications. ISBN 978-1-874427-52-0.
