= 1930–31 Northern Football League =

The 1930–31 Northern Football League season was the 38th in the history of the Northern Football League, a football competition in Northern England.

== Clubs ==
Northern League
- Season: 1930–31
- Champions: Bishop Auckland
- Matches: 156
- Goals: 722 (4.63 per match)

The league featured 12 clubs which competed in the last season, along with one new club:

- Trimdon Grange Colliery

=== League table ===
Pos	Team	Pld	W	D	L	GF	GA	GR	Pts	Promotion or relegation
1	Bishop Auckland	24	17	3	4	75	36	2.083	37	
2	Stockton	24	15	5	4	90	35	2.571	35	
3	South Bank	24	13	4	7	56	42	1.333	30	
4	Tow Law Town	24	12	4	8	43	50	0.860	28	
5	Stanley United	24	13	1	10	70	48	1.458	27	
6	Cockfield	24	10	7	7	52	65	0.800	27	
7	Willington	24	10	5	9	54	47	1.149	25	
8	Whitby United	24	8	6	10	56	53	1.057	22	
9	Eden Colliery Welfare	24	8	6	10	37	53	0.698	22	Left the league
10	Trimdon Grange Colliery	24	7	6	11	60	76	0.789	20	
11	Esh Winning	24	5	5	14	44	73	0.603	15	
12	Chilton Colliery Recreation Athletic	24	5	3	16	44	78	0.564	13	
13	Ferryhill Athletic	24	4	3	17	41	66	0.621	11	

Rules for classification: 1) points; 2) goal ratio.
