= 1937–38 Northern Football League =

The 1937–38 Northern Football League season was the 45th in the history of the Northern Football League, a football competition in Northern England.

== Clubs ==
Northern League
- Season: 1937–38
- Champions: Ferryhill Athletic
- Matches: 182
- Goals: 772 (4.24 per match)

The league featured 13 clubs which competed in the last season, along with one new club:

- Billingham South

=== League table ===
Pos	Team	Pld	W	D	L	GF	GA	GR	Pts
1	Ferryhill Athletic	26	21	0	5	81	36	2.250	42
2	Bishop Auckland	26	16	4	6	70	38	1.842	36
3	Shildon	26	16	2	8	72	39	1.846	34
4	Cockfield	26	14	6	6	44	31	1.419	34
5	Stockton	26	14	5	7	69	48	1.438	33
6	Chilton Colliery Recreation Athletic	26	11	6	9	44	45	0.978	28
7	Billingham South	26	11	4	11	59	56	1.054	26
8	Evenwood Town	26	9	4	13	45	55	0.818	22
9	Whitby United	26	8	6	12	47	78	0.603	22
10	South Bank	26	8	4	14	49	56	0.875	20
11	Willington	26	9	2	15	55	66	0.833	20
12	Crook Town	26	9	2	15	41	56	0.732	20
13	West Auckland Town	26	7	3	16	52	68	0.765	17
14	Tow Law Town	26	2	6	18	44	100	0.440	10

Rules for classification: 1) points; 2) goal ratio.
