= Derrick Williams =

Derrick Williams may refer to:

- Derrick Williams (American football) (born 1986), American football wide receiver
- Derrick Williams (basketball) (born 1991), American basketball forward
- Derrick Williams (footballer) (born 1993), German-born Irish association footballer
- Derrick Williams (hurdler) (born 1982), American track and field athlete

== See also ==
- Derek Williams (disambiguation)
