= Roddy Gribben =

Irish Gaelic footballer

Roddy Gribben (1924/5-2017) was an Irish Gaelic footballer who played in the 1958 All-Ireland Final. He was a brother of Owen, Willie, Hugh Francis, Mickey and Henry, who all lined out beside him at various stages.
