= 1923–24 Northern Football League =

The 1923–24 Northern Football League season was the 31st in the history of the Northern Football League, a football competition in Northern England.

== Clubs ==
Northern League
- Season: 1923–24
- Champions: Tow Law Town
- Matches: 210
- Goals: 774 (3.69 per match)

The league featured 14 clubs which competed in the last season, along with one new club:

- Ferryhill Athletic

=== League table ===
Pos	Team	Pld	W	D	L	GF	GA	GR	Pts
1	Tow Law Town	28	17	6	5	61	34	1.794	40
2	Ferryhill Athletic	28	15	9	4	69	36	1.917	39
3	Bishop Auckland	28	17	3	8	53	33	1.606	37
4	Stockton	28	16	4	8	79	52	1.519	36
5	Crook Town	28	14	8	6	66	50	1.320	36
6	South Bank	28	13	7	8	49	31	1.581	33
7	Cockfield	28	12	5	11	50	43	1.163	29
8	Loftus Albion	28	11	4	13	42	47	0.894	26
9	Eston United	28	9	7	12	56	53	1.057	25
10	Scarborough	28	8	9	11	55	55	1.000	25
11	Stanley United	28	8	7	13	44	65	0.677	23
12	Darlington Railway Athletic	28	8	6	14	45	69	0.652	22
13	Esh Winning	28	6	6	16	36	69	0.522	18
14	Langley Park	28	6	4	18	36	69	0.522	16
15	Willington	28	5	5	18	33	68	0.485	15

Rules for classification: 1) points; 2) goal ratio.
