= 1957–58 Northern Football League =

The 1957–58 Northern Football League season was the 60th in the history of the Northern Football League, a football competition in Northern England.

== Clubs ==
Northern League
- Season: 1957–58
- Champions: Ferryhill Athletic
- Matches: 182
- Goals: 867 (4.76 per match)

The league featured 14 clubs which competed in the last season, no new clubs joined the league this season.

=== League table ===
Pos	Team	Pld	W	D	L	GF	GA	GR	Pts
1	Ferryhill Athletic	26	20	3	3	90	41	2.195	43
2	Willington	26	16	5	5	66	41	1.610	37
3	Crook Town	26	16	4	6	95	35	2.714	36
4	Bishop Auckland	26	14	6	6	75	49	1.531	34
5	Evenwood Town	26	12	5	9	62	58	1.069	29
6	Durham City	26	11	5	10	57	45	1.267	27
7	Stanley United	26	10	3	13	59	58	1.017	23
8	Tow Law Town	26	10	3	13	57	57	1.000	23
9	West Auckland Town	26	9	5	12	68	72	0.944	23
10	Billingham Synthonia	26	6	10	10	54	61	0.885	22
11	Penrith	26	9	3	14	45	79	0.570	21
12	Whitby Town	26	7	5	14	58	69	0.841	19
13	Shildon	26	7	4	15	51	73	0.699	18
14	South Bank	26	4	1	21	30	129	0.233	9

Rules for classification: 1) points; 2) goal ratio.
