= Colm Mulholland =

Irish Gaelic footballer (1928 or 1929 – 2025)

Mulholland from a team photo

Colm Mulholland (1928 or 1929 – 25 July 2025) was an Irish Gaelic footballer who played in the 1958 All-Ireland Final. He was with his Lavey teammate Tommy Doherty for the game. He was 13 years a county player. He was the brother-in-law of Sean O'Connell. He got himself a goal against Armagh in the 1955 Ulster Senior semi-final and died on 25 July 2025, at the age of 96.
