= Brian Mullan (Gaelic footballer) =

Irish Gaelic footballer (died 2021)

Brian Mullan (died 3 September 2021) was an Irish Gaelic footballer who played in the 1958 All-Ireland Final. He was also chairman of Ballerin.
