= Jake Iceton =

English footballer

Personal information
- Full name: Jacob Iceton
- Date of birth: 22 October 1903
- Place of birth: West Auckland, England
- Date of death: 1981 (aged 77–78)
- Position: Goalkeeper

Senior career*
Years	Team	Apps	(Gls)
–1925	Cockfield		
1925–1926	Hull City	0	(0)
1926–1930	Shildon		
1930–1935	Fulham	90	(0)
1935–1936	Aldershot	10	(0)
1936–1939	Clapton Orient	40	(0)
- Worcester City
- * Club domestic league appearances and goals

Jacob Iceton (22 October 1903 – 1981) was an English professional footballer who played in the Football League for Fulham, Clapton Orient and Aldershot as a goalkeeper.

== Career statistics ==
Appearances and goals by club, season and competition
Club	Season	League			FA Cup		Total	
Club	Season	Division	Apps	Goals	Apps	Goals	Apps	Goals
Fulham	1930–31	Third Division South	36	0	4	0	40	0
Fulham	1931–32	Third Division South	33	0	5	0	38	0
Fulham	1932–33	Second Division	19	0	0	0	19	0
Fulham	1933–34	Second Division	2	0	0	0	2	0
Career total			90	0	9	0	99	0

== Honours ==
Fulham

- Football League Third Division South: 1931–32
