= 1939–40 Northern Football League =

The 1939–40 Northern Football League season was the 47th in the history of the Northern Football League, a football competition in Northern England.

== Clubs ==
Northern League
- Season: 1939–40
- Champions: Shildon
- Matches: 30
- Goals: 173 (5.77 per match)

The league originally featured 12 clubs which competed in the last season, along with two new clubs:

- Heaton Stannington
- Brandon Social

The initial competition was abandoned on 16 December 1939 after Whitby United, Evenwood Town, Brandon Social, Billingham, Cockfield, and Ferryhill Athletic resigned from the league between 30 September and 16 December. The remaining eight clubs agreed to begin a new competition beginning on 1 January 1940.

=== League table ===
Pos	Team	Pld	W	D	L	GF	GA	GR	Pts
1	Shildon	10	9	0	1	47	19	2.474	18
2	Bishop Auckland	10	5	2	3	33	27	1.222	12
3	Crook Town	10	5	1	4	29	24	1.208	11
4	Heaton Stannington	10	3	1	6	26	29	0.897	7
5	South Bank	10	3	1	6	20	34	0.588	7
6	West Auckland Town	10	2	1	7	18	40	0.450	5
–	Tow Law Town	0	–	–	–	–	–	—	0 (Note: Tow Law Town & Willington resigned from the league on 20 March 1940. Their records were expunged.)
–	Willington	0	–	–	–	–	–	—	0

Rules for classification: 1) points; 2) goal ratio
