= 1946–47 Welsh Cup =

Tournament details
- Country: Wales

Final positions
- Champions: (England) Chester
- Runners-up: (Wales) Merthyr Tydfil

The 1946–47 FAW Welsh Cup is the 60th season of the annual knockout tournament for competitive football teams in Wales.

== Key ==
League name pointed after clubs name.

- FL D2 - Football League Second Division
- FL D3N - Football League Third Division North
- LC - Lancashire Combination
- SFL - Southern Football League

== Fifth round ==
Six winners from the Fourth round and six new clubs.

Tie no	Home	Score	Away
1	Bangor City (LC)	3–5	Chester (FL D3N)

== Sixth round ==
Six winners from the Fifth round plus two new clubs - winner and runner-up of the previous Welsh Cup.

Tie no	Home	Score	Away
1	Swansea Town (FL D2)	1–3	Chester (FL D3N)

== Semifinal ==
Chester and Newport County played at Wrexham, Wrexham and Merthyr Tydfil played at Cardiff.

Tie no	Home	Score	Away
1	Chester (FL D3N)	3–2	Newport County (FL D2)
2	Wrexham (FL D3N)	0–2	Merthyr Tydfil (SFL)

== Final ==
Final were held at Cardiff, replay were held at Wrexham.

Tie no	Home	Score	Away
1	Chester (FL D3N)	0–0	Merthyr Tydfil (SFL)
replay	Chester (FL D3N)	5–1	Merthyr Tydfil (SFL)
