= Dennis Isherwood (footballer, born 1924) =

English footballer

Personal information
- Full name: Dennis Isherwood
- Date of birth: 9 January 1924
- Place of birth: Northwich, England
- Date of death: February 1974 (age 50)
- Place of death: Stoke-on-Trent, England
- Position: Forward

Senior career*
Years	Team	Apps	(Gls)
- Rochdale
- Wrexham
1946–1947	Chester	3	(0)
- Northwich Victoria
- Wellington Town
- Winsford United
1950–1951	Macclesfield Town	6	(0)
- Runcorn
1953–1956	Congleton Town	114	(49)
- Stafford Rangers

Managerial career
- Sandbach Ramblers
- * Club domestic league appearances and goals

Dennis Isherwood (9 January 1924 – February 1974) was an English footballer who played as a forward in the Football League for Chester after World War II. He later played non-League football for Northwich Victoria, Wellington Town, Winsford United, Macclesfield Town, Runcorn, Congleton Town and Stafford Rangers.

== Career ==
Isherwood was signed with Rochdale during World War II and guested for Crewe Alexandra and Wolverhampton Wanderers, before signing for Wrexham. With the war still raging he guested for Port Vale on 9 May 1945 in a Potteries derby war match which was lost 4–2. After the war he made three Third Division North appearances for Frank Brown's Chester in 1946–47, before leaving Sealand Road and dropping into non-League football in 1947 with Northwich Victoria, Wellington Town, Winsford United, Macclesfield Town, Runcorn, Congleton Town and then Stafford Rangers. He later became the manager of Sandbach Ramblers.
