= Phil Stuart =

Gaelic football player

Phil Stuart is an Irish former Gaelic footballer who played in the 1958 All-Ireland Final. His midfield partner was Jim McKeever. He also trained a young Martin O'Neill.
