= Hugh Francis Gribben =

Gaelic footballer

Hugh Francis Gribben is an Irish former Gaelic footballer who played in the 1958 All-Ireland Final. He was a brother of Roddy, Willie, Owen, Mickey and Henry, who all lined out beside him at various stages.
