= 1947–48 Welsh Cup =

Tournament details
- Country: Wales

Final positions
- Champions: (Wales) Lovell's Athletic
- Runners-up: (England) Shrewsbury Town

The 1947–48 FAW Welsh Cup is the 61st season of the annual knockout tournament for competitive football teams in Wales.

== Key ==
League name pointed after clubs name.

- CCL - Cheshire County League
- FL D3N - Football League Third Division North
- ML - Midland League
- SFL - Southern Football League

== Fifth round ==
Six winners from the Fourth round, Llanelly and 13 new clubs.

Tie no	Home	Score	Away
1	South Liverpool (CCL)	2–1	Chester (FL D3N)

== Sixth round ==
Four winners from the Fifth round. Six other clubs get a bye to the Seventh round.

== Seventh round ==
Two winners from the Sixth round plus six clubs who get a bye in the previous round.

== Semifinal ==
South Liverpool and Lovell's Athletic played at Shrewsbury, Barry Town and Shrewsbury Town played at Merthyr.

Tie no	Home	Score	Away
1	South Liverpool (CCL)	0–1	Lovell's Athletic (SFL)
2	Barry Town (SFL)	1–3	Shrewsbury Town (ML)

== Final ==
Final were held at Wrexham.

Tie no	Home	Score	Away
1	Lovell's Athletic (SFL)	3–0	Shrewsbury Town (ML)
