= Owen Gribben =

Gaelic footballer

Owen Gribben was an Irish Gaelic footballer who played in the 1958 All-Ireland Final. He was a brother of Roddy, Willie, Hugh Francis, Mickey and Henry, who all lined out beside him at various stages.
