= Derek Williams (footballer, born 1937) =

English footballer

Personal information
- Full name: Derek Williams
- Date of birth: 28 January 1937
- Place of birth: Wardley, Gateshead, England
- Date of death: 2015 (aged 77–78)
- Place of death: Doncaster, England
- Height: 5 ft 9 in (1.75 m)
- Position: Inside forward

Senior career*
Years	Team	Apps	(Gls)
1954–1955	Doncaster YMCA		
1955–1956	Doncaster Rovers	0	(0)
1956	Sheffield Wednesday	0	(0)
1956–1962	Grimsby Town	44	(19)
1962–1963	Bradford Park Avenue	19	(8)
1963–196?	Skegness Town		
- * Club domestic league appearances and goals

Derek Williams (28 January 1937 – January 2015) was an English professional footballer who played as an inside forward in the Football League for Grimsby Town and Bradford Park Avenue.
