= Stan Leonard (footballer) =

Welsh footballer

Personal information
- Date of birth: 8 October 1924
- Place of birth: Hawarden, Wales
- Date of death: 1 August 1995 (aged 70)
- Place of death: Petersfield, England
- Position: Winger

Senior career*
Years	Team	Apps	(Gls)
1946–1947	Chester	1	(0)
- * Club domestic league appearances and goals

Stan Leonard (1924–1995) was a Welsh footballer, who played as a winger in the Football League for Chester.
