= Ken Ellis (footballer, born 1928) =

Welsh footballer (1928–2003)

Personal information
- Full name: Kenneth Ellis
- Date of birth: 22 January 1928
- Place of birth: Buckley, Wales
- Date of death: 25 July 2003 (aged 75) (Note: Ellis's death was registered in July 2003 in the Wrexham registration district, which covers not only Wrexham itself but also other nearby towns and villages.)
- Place of death: North Wales
- Position: Winger

Youth career
- –: Chester

Senior career*
Years	Team	Apps	(Gls)
1946–1949	Chester	1	(0)
1949–1950	Wrexham	5	(0)
–	Flint Town United		
- * Club domestic league appearances and goals

Kenneth Ellis (22 January 1928 – 25 July 2003) was a Welsh amateur footballer who played as a winger in the Football League for Chester and Wrexham. He also played for Welsh club Flint Town United.
