= John Mulholland (footballer, born 1928) =

Scottish footballer

Personal information
- Full name: John Ross Mulholland
- Date of birth: 7 December 1928
- Place of birth: Dumbarton, Scotland
- Date of death: July 2015 (aged 86)
- Place of death: Lincolnshire, England
- Position: Winger

Senior career*
Years	Team	Apps	(Gls)
1945–1946	Renton Guild		
1946–1949	Plymouth Argyle	0	(0)
1949–1950	Grimsby Town	2	(0)
1950–1952	Scunthorpe & Lindsey United	6	(1)
1952–195?	Grantham		
- * Club domestic league appearances and goals

John Ross Mulholland (7 December 1928 – July 2015) was a Scottish professional footballer who played as a winger.
