= 1971–72 All-Ireland Senior Club Football Championship =

Irish Football Championship

- Champions: Bellaghy (1st title); Larry Diamond (manager)
- Runners-up: University College Cork

Provincial Champions
- Munster: University College Cork
- Leinster: Portlaoise
- Ulster: Bellaghy
- Connacht: Claremorris

The 1971–72 All-Ireland Senior Club Football Championship was the second staging of the All-Ireland Senior Club Football Championship since its establishment by the Gaelic Athletic Association in 1970–71.

Bellaghy defeated University College Cork by 0–15 to 1–11 in the final at Croke Park on 12 May 1972 to win the competition. It remains the club's only title.

== Semi-finals ==
23 April 1972 Semi-final	University College Cork	3-12 - 1-07	Claremorris	Cork Athletic Grounds

23 April 1972 Semi-final	Bellaghy	1-13 - 1-10	Portlaoise	Rossa Park

=== Final ===
12 May 1972 Final	Bellaghy	0-15 - 1-11	University College Cork	Croke Park
	F O'Loane 0-7, B Cassidy 0-3, T Quinn 0-2, P Doherty 0-1, F Downey 0-1, T Diamond 0-1.		D Coffey 0-5, D Kavanagh 1-1, P Lynch 0-2, B Lynch 0-2, N Sullivan 0-1.	Referee: D Guerin (Dublin)

== Statistics ==
=== Miscellaneous ===
- Portlaoise won the Leinster Club SFC for the first time. They were also the first team from Laois to win the provincial title.
- Claremorris won the Connacht Club SFC title for the first time.
