= Fred Wilcox (footballer) =

English footballer (1922 – 2015)

Personal information
- Full name: Frederick Wilcox
- Date of birth: 23 October 1922
- Place of birth: St Helens, England
- Date of death: 22 January 2015 (aged 92)
- Place of death: Liverpool, England
- Position: Full back

Senior career*
| Years | Team | Apps | (Gls) |
| 1947–1948 | Chester | 16 | (0) |
- * Club domestic league appearances and goals

Fred Wilcox (23 October 1922 – 22 January 2015) was an English footballer, who played as a full back in the Football League for Chester.
