= Charles Hayes Higgins =

British surgeon and medical author

Dr Charles Hayes Higgins FRSE FRCS (1811–1898) was a British surgeon and medical author.

== Life ==
He was born off the coast of Java on board the flagship of Admiral John Hayes from whom his second name was taken. His father, Col Charles Thomas Higgins, was at the time storming Batavia on behalf of the Honourable East India Company, successfully capturing it from the French. His mother was on board in her capacity as his wife (officers being entitled to bring their wives at the time).

Charles junior was educated at Dr Radcliffe's School in Salisbury, and then studied medicine in various locations due to his father's unsettled home life. His studies took him to Bristol, Edinburgh, Paris and Guy's Hospital in London. He qualified in 1834, slightly late in comparison to others of this period, due to this lack of continuity. His doctorate (MD) was granted by St Andrews University in 1839.

After some years in Taunton, during which time he founded the Taunton and West Somerset Medical Association, he settled in Birkenhead in 1850. Here he served as Surgeon in the Birkenhead Hospital, Consulting Physician in the Wirral's Children's Hospital, Consulting Physician to the Birkenhead Eye and Ear Hospital and a Surgeon-Major in the 1st Cheshire Engineer Volunteers.

In 1871 he was elected a Fellow of the Royal Society of Edinburgh, his proposer being James Matthews Duncan.

He died at Birkenhead on 14 January 1898.

== Publications ==
- On Fractured Clavicle (1839)
- Case of Inversion of the Uterus from Polypus (1849)
