= John Mills (footballer, born 1920) =

Welsh footballer

Jack Mills
Personal information
- Full name: Jack Mills
- Date of birth: 19 December 1920
- Place of birth: Bagillt, Wales
- Date of death: 1982 (aged 61–62)
- Place of death: Louth, England
- Position: Full back

Senior career*
Years	Team	Apps	(Gls)
1946–1947	Chester	3	(0)
- * Club domestic league appearances and goals

Jack Mills (1920–1982) was a footballer who played as a full back in the Football League for Chester. He subsequently played for Altrincham F.C.
