= Bobby Williams (footballer, born 1932) =

English footballer

Personal information
- Full name: Robert Francis Williams
- Date of birth: 24 November 1932 (age 93)
- Place of birth: Chester, England
- Position: Inside forward

Senior career*
Years	Team	Apps	(Gls)
1949–1950	New Brighton	1	(0)
1950–1951	South Liverpool		
1951–1960	Chester	37	(3)
- Runcorn
Total		38	(3)
- * Club domestic league appearances and goals

Bobby Williams (born 24 November 1932) is an English footballer who played as an inside forward in the Football League for Chester.
