= Sammy Gledhill =

English footballer

Personal information
- Full name: Samuel Gledhill
- Date of birth: 7 July 1913
- Place of birth: Castleford, England
- Date of death: December 1994
- Place of death: Leeds, England
- Position: Wing half

Senior career*
Years	Team	Apps	(Gls)
	Altofts	?	(?)
1936–1948	York City	123	(6)
- * Club domestic league appearances and goals

Samuel Gledhill (7 July 1913 – December 1994) was an English footballer.
