= George Williamson (footballer, born 1925) =

English footballer

Personal information
- Date of birth: 13 September 1925
- Place of birth: Newcastle upon Tyne, England
- Date of death: 1994 (aged 68–69)
- Position: Wing half

Senior career*
Years	Team	Apps	(Gls)
1945–1947	Middlesbrough	0	(0)
1947–1950	Chester	75	(4)
1950–1957	Bradford City	223	(31)
- Colwyn Bay
Total		298	(35)
- * Club domestic league appearances and goals

George Williamson (13 September 1925 – 1994) was an English professional footballer who played as a wing half.

== Career ==
Born in Newcastle upon Tyne, Williamson played for Middlesbrough, Chester, Bradford City, and Colwyn Bay.

He signed for Bradford City in June 1950 from Chester, and left for Colwyn Bay in July 1957. During his time with Bradford City he scored 31 goals in 223 league appearances, as well as two goals in 12 games in the FA Cup.

== Sources ==
- Frost, Terry (1988). Bradford City A Complete Record 1903-1988. Breedon Books Sport. ISBN 0-907969-38-0.
