= 1989–90 FA Trophy =

1989-90 FA Trophy
FA Challenge Trophy

Tournament details
- Country: England; Wales
- Teams: 180

Final positions
- Champions: Barrow
- Runners-up: Leek Town

The 1989–90 FA Trophy was the twenty-first season of the FA Trophy.

== First qualifying round ==
=== Ties ===
Tie	Home team	Score	Away team
1	Atherstone United	1-2	Alfreton Town
2	Baldock Town	0-3	Chalfont St Peter
3	Banbury United	4-2	Barking
4	Barry Town	2-0	Bridgend Town
5	Billingham Town	0-0	Stockton
6	Bishop's Stortford	0-0	Harrow Borough
7	Boreham Wood	1-2	Kingsbury Town
8	Brandon United	2-0	Easington Colliery
9	Burnham	1-0	Chesham United
10	Canterbury City	2-1	Tooting & Mitcham United
11	Colne Dynamoes	3-2	Accrington Stanley
12	Croydon	0-1	Bognor Regis Town
13	Dorking	0-0	Kingstonian
14	Dudley Town	2-2	Moor Green
15	Dulwich Hamlet	0-1	Staines Town
16	Dunstable	2-2	Corby Town
17	Erith & Belvedere	2-0	Gosport Borough
18	Ferryhill Athletic	2-0	Morecambe
19	Fleetwood Town	0-2	Seaham Red Star
20	Frome Town	0-0	Poole Town
21	Gainsborough Trinity	2-2	Caernarfon Town
22	Gateshead	2-2	Shildon
23	Gloucester City	4-0	Dorchester Town
24	Goole Town	5-2	Colwyn Bay
25	Grays Athletic	0-3	Tamworth
26	Halesowen Town	0-3	Shepshed Charterhouse
27	Hampton	1-0	Basingstoke Town
28	Hayes	0-2	Sutton Coldfield Town
29	Leatherhead	1-1	Marlow
30	Leek Town	3-1	Hednesford Town
31	Maesteg Park	2-1	Cwmbran Town
32	Margate	3-0	Andover
33	Matlock Town	0-1	Stalybridge Celtic (tie awarded to Matlock Town)
34	Mossley	4-0	Horwich R M I
35	Newtown	3-2	Grantham
36	Nuneaton Borough w/o-scr Coventry Sporting		
37	Penrith	1-2	Whitby Town
38	Purfleet	0-2	Uxbridge
39	Redditch United	4-1	Eastwood Town
40	Salisbury	4-4	Lewes
41	Sheppey United	2-2	Ashford Town (Kent)
42	Southport	2-3	Whitley Bay
43	Stroud	3-0	Bideford
44	Ton Pentre	0-1	Taunton Town
45	Tonbridge	1-1	Folkestone
46	Walton & Hersham	2-0	Waterlooville
47	Wembley	1-0	St Albans City
48	Willenhall Town	1-2	Winsford United
49	Witney Town	1-0	Bury Town
50	Wivenhoe Town	3-0	Chelmsford City
51	Workington	0-1	North Shields
52	Worksop Town	1-1	Bedworth United

=== Replays ===
Tie	Home team	Score	Away team
5	Stockton	3-1	Billingham Town
6	Harrow Borough	2-1	Bishop's Stortford
13	Kingstonian	7-2	Dorking
14	Moor Green	3-2	Dudley Town
16	Corby Town	1-4	Dunstable
20	Poole Town	4-0	Frome Town
21	Caernarfon Town	3-1	Gainsborough Trinity
22	Shildon	0-6	Gateshead
29	Marlow	2-0	Leatherhead
40	Lewes	1-1	Salisbury
41	Ashford Town (Kent)	5-0	Sheppey United
45	Folkestone	4-0	Tonbridge
52	Bedworth United	2-0	Worksop Town

=== 2nd replay ===
Tie	Home team	Score	Away team
40	Salisbury	4-2	Lewes

== Second qualifying round ==
=== Ties ===
Tie	Home team	Score	Away team
1	Brandon United	2-2	Whitby Town
2	Canterbury City	0-3	Hampton
3	Chalfont St Peter	3-0	Banbury United
4	Congleton Town	3-2	Mossley
5	Dunstable	1-3	Burnham
6	Erith & Belvedere	4-2	Southwick
7	Folkestone	1-2	Metropolitan Police
8	Gateshead	1-2	North Shields
9	Gloucester City	2-1	Barry Town
10	Goole Town	4-4	Alfreton Town
11	Harrow Borough	4-1	Kingsbury Town
12	Hitchin Town	1-0	Wembley
13	Maesteg Park	2-2	Saltash United
14	Margate	1-1	Ashford Town (Kent)
15	Marlow	0-0	Bognor Regis Town
16	Matlock Town	1-1	Shepshed Charterhouse
17	Moor Green	1-3	Leek Town
18	Newtown	1-0	Radcliffe Borough
19	Nuneaton Borough	1-1	Alvechurch
20	Redditch United	2-3	Caernarfon Town
21	Seaham Red Star	2-2	Ferryhill Athletic
22	Staines Town	3-2	Salisbury
23	Stockton	0-5	Colne Dynamoes
24	Stroud	2-0	Taunton Town
25	Uxbridge	2-4	Sutton Coldfield Town
26	Walton & Hersham	0-1	Kingstonian
27	Weston Super Mare	2-0	Poole Town
28	Whitley Bay	1-2	Durham City
29	Whyteleafe	4-0	Worthing
30	Winsford United	1-1	Bedworth United
31	Witney Town	3-0	Stourbridge
32	Wivenhoe Town	2-2	Tamworth

=== Replays ===
Tie	Home team	Score	Away team
1	Whitby Town	0-2	Brandon United
10	Alfreton Town	3-1	Goole Town
13	Saltash United	2-0	Maesteg Park
14	Ashford Town (Kent)	3-2	Margate
15	Bognor Regis Town	1-1	Marlow
16	Shepshed Charterhouse	2-1	Matlock Town
19	Alvechurch	1-2	Nuneaton Borough
21	Ferryhill Athletic	1-3	Seaham Red Star
30	Bedworth United	2-1	Winsford United
32	Tamworth	1-4	Wivenhoe Town

=== 2nd replay ===
Tie	Home team	Score	Away team
15	Bognor Regis Town	6-1	Marlow

== Third qualifying round ==
=== Ties ===
Tie	Home team	Score	Away team
1	Bath City	2-0	Witney Town
2	Bedworth United	1-4	Nuneaton Borough
3	Bognor Regis Town	2-4	Weston Super Mare
4	Brandon United	0-2	Marine
5	Bromsgrove Rovers	4-2	Leicester United
6	Burnham	0-0	Hendon
7	Buxton	0-0	Shepshed Charterhouse
8	Caernarfon Town	1-2	Bangor City
9	Chalfont St Peter	1-3	Ashford Town (Kent)
10	Chorley	1-3	Blyth Spartans
11	Dagenham	2-1	Cambridge City
12	Dover Athletic	2-0	Crawley Town
13	Erith & Belvedere	1-1	Harrow Borough
14	Frickley Athletic	0-1	Guisborough Town
15	Gloucester City	0-1	Worcester City
16	Gravesend & Northfleet	2-0	Carshalton Athletic
17	Hampton	1-2	Staines Town
18	Hitchin Town	1-1	Kingstonian
19	Leyton Wingate	1-0	Bromley
20	Metropolitan Police	2-1	Whyteleafe
21	Newtown	0-1	Leek Town
22	North Shields	0-3	Colne Dynamoes
23	Rhyl	0-0	Stafford Rangers
24	Seaham Red Star	4-1	Durham City
25	South Liverpool	0-2	Gretna
26	Spennymoor United	4-0	South Bank
27	Stroud	1-10	Slough Town
28	Sutton Coldfield Town	2-1	Congleton Town
29	V S Rugby	1-1	Wivenhoe Town
30	Weymouth	1-0	Saltash United
31	Witton Albion	3-0	Alfreton Town
32	Woking	5-1	Fareham Town

=== Replays ===
Tie	Home team	Score	Away team
6	Hendon	3-2	Burnham
7	Shepshed Charterhouse	1-0	Buxton
13	Harrow Borough	0-0	Erith & Belvedere
18	Kingstonian	2-1	Hitchin Town
23	Stafford Rangers	2-1	Rhyl
29	Wivenhoe Town	1-0	V S Rugby

=== 2nd replay ===
Tie	Home team	Score	Away team
13	Harrow Borough	2-0	Erith & Belvedere

== 1st round ==
The teams that given byes to this round are Telford United, Darlington, Kettering Town, Wycombe Wanderers, Boston United, Kidderminster Harriers, Barnet, Runcorn, Macclesfield Town, Yeovil Town, Northwich Victoria, Welling United, Cheltenham Town, Enfield, Sutton United, Altrincham, Fisher Athletic, Merthyr Tydfil, Barrow, Farnborough Town, Aylesbury United, Wealdstone, Dartford, Burton Albion, Hyde United, Wokingham Town, Newcastle Blue Star, Bishop Auckland, Redbridge Forest, Windsor and Eton, Billingham Synthonia and Tow Law Town.

=== Ties ===
Tie	Home team	Score	Away team
1	Ashford Town (Kent)	0-4	Bath City
2	Aylesbury United	2-2	Worcester City
3	Barrow	1-0	Bangor City
4	Billingham Synthonia	1-1	Darlington
5	Boston United	0-0	Macclesfield Town
6	Cheltenham Town	5-1	Gravesend & Northfleet
7	Colne Dynamoes	5-0	Altrincham
8	Dagenham	2-5	Kingstonian
9	Dartford	1-2	Yeovil Town
10	Enfield	3-2	Merthyr Tydfil
11	Farnborough Town	1-0	Staines Town
12	Gretna	2-2	Hyde United
13	Kettering Town	0-2	Wokingham Town
14	Leyton Wingate	0-3	Kidderminster Harriers
15	Newcastle Blue Star	0-0	Runcorn
16	Northwich Victoria	1-1	Bishop Auckland
17	Seaham Red Star	2-0	Marine
18	Shepshed Charterhouse	1-1	Nuneaton Borough
19	Slough Town	1-1	Redbridge Forest
20	Spennymoor United	1-2	Leek Town
21	Stafford Rangers	2-1	Guisborough Town
22	Sutton Coldfield Town	2-2	Tow Law Town
23	Sutton United	0-1	Dover Athletic
24	Telford United	2-1	Burton Albion
25	Wealdstone	1-1	Harrow Borough
26	Welling United	2-0	Fisher Athletic
27	Weston Super Mare	2-3	Windsor & Eton
28	Weymouth	2-0	Barnet
29	Witton Albion	2-0	Blyth Spartans
30	Wivenhoe Town	2-1	Hendon
31	Woking	3-0	Bromsgrove Rovers
32	Wycombe Wanderers	1-3	Metropolitan Police

=== Replays ===
Tie	Home team	Score	Away team
2	Worcester City	0-1	Aylesbury United
4	Darlington	3-1	Billingham Synthonia
5	Macclesfield Town	3-0	Boston United
12	Hyde United	1-1	Gretna
15	Runcorn	4-1	Newcastle Blue Star
16	Bishop Auckland	2-3	Northwich Victoria
18	Nuneaton Borough	1-0	Shepshed Charterhouse
19	Redbridge Forest	3-0	Slough Town
22	Tow Law Town	3-1	Sutton Coldfield Town
25	Harrow Borough	1-0	Wealdstone

=== 2nd replay ===
Tie	Home team	Score	Away team
12	Hyde United	2-1	Gretna

== 2nd round ==
=== Ties ===
Tie	Home team	Score	Away team
1	Barrow	1-0	Metropolitan Police
2	Bath City	2-0	Tow Law Town
3	Cheltenham Town	3-1	Enfield
4	Colne Dynamoes	1-0	Northwich Victoria
5	Darlington	1-0	Macclesfield Town
6	Dover Athletic	2-1	Weymouth
7	Farnborough Town	2-1	Windsor & Eton
8	Harrow Borough	0-0	Redbridge Forest
9	Kingstonian	2-1	Hyde United
10	Leek Town	1-1	Nuneaton Borough
11	Telford United	0-0	Welling United
12	Witton Albion	0-0	Kidderminster Harriers
13	Wivenhoe Town	1-1	Runcorn
14	Woking	3-1	Seaham Red Star
15	Wokingham Town	0-0	Stafford Rangers
16	Yeovil Town	2-0	Aylesbury United

=== Replays ===
Tie	Home team	Score	Away team
8	Redbridge Forest	2-0	Harrow Borough
10	Nuneaton Borough	0-1	Leek Town
11	Welling United	0-2	Telford United
12	Kidderminster Harriers	2-1	Witton Albion
13	Runcorn	3-2	Wivenhoe Town
15	Stafford Rangers	3-1	Wokingham Town

== 3rd round ==
=== Ties ===
Tie	Home team	Score	Away team
1	Colne Dynamoes	2-1	Farnborough Town
2	Darlington	1-0	Runcorn
3	Kidderminster Harriers	3-0	Dover Athletic
4	Kingstonian	3-3	Cheltenham Town
5	Stafford Rangers	0-0	Redbridge Forest
6	Telford United	0-0	Leek Town
7	Woking	1-1	Bath City
8	Yeovil Town	1-1	Barrow

=== Replays ===
Tie	Home team	Score	Away team
4	Cheltenham Town	0-3	Kingstonian
5	Redbridge Forest	1-2	Stafford Rangers
6	Leek Town	3-0	Telford United
7	Bath City	2-1	Woking
8	Barrow	2-1	Yeovil Town

== 4th round ==
=== Ties ===
Tie	Home team	Score	Away team
1	Bath City	0-2	Stafford Rangers
2	Kidderminster Harriers	0-0	Colne Dynamoes
3	Kingstonian	2-2	Barrow
4	Leek Town	1-0	Darlington

=== Replays ===
Tie	Home team	Score	Away team
2	Colne Dynamoes	2-1	Kidderminster Harriers
3	Barrow	1-0	Kingstonian

== Semi finals ==
=== First leg ===
Tie	Home team	Score	Away team
1	Colne Dynamoes	0-1	Barrow
2	Stafford Rangers	0-0	Leek Town

=== Second leg ===
Tie	Home team	Score	Away team	Aggregate
1	Barrow	2-1	Colne Dynamoes	3-1
2	Leek Town	1-0	Stafford Rangers	1-0

== Final ==
=== Tie ===
Home team	Score	Away team
Barrow	3-0	Leek Town
