= Derek Williams (footballer, born 1934) =

Welsh footballer

Personal information
- Full name: Derek Williams
- Date of birth: 15 June 1934
- Place of birth: Mold, Wales
- Date of death: May 2014 (aged 79)
- Place of death: Chester, Wales
- Position: Goalkeeper

Senior career*
Years	Team	Apps	(Gls)
- Mold Alexandra
–1951	Pwllheli		
1951	Manchester City	1	(0)
–1953	Connah's Quay Nomads		
1953–1954	Bangor University		
1954–1955	Wrexham	12	(0)
–1956	Mold Alexandra		
1956	Oldham Athletic	28	(0)
- Middlesex Wanderers
- Marine
1963–1974	Chester Nomads		

International career
1952–1955	Wales Amateurs	11	(0)
- * Club domestic league appearances and goals

Derek Williams (15 June 1934 – May 2014) was a Welsh amateur footballer who appeared in the Football League for Oldham Athletic, Wrexham and Manchester City as a goalkeeper. He was capped by Wales at amateur level.

== Personal life ==
Williams attended Alun School.

== Career statistics ==
Appearances and goals by club, season and competition
Club	Season	League			National Cup		Total	
Club	Season	Division	Apps	Goals	Apps	Goals	Apps	Goals
Manchester City	1951–52	First Division	1	0	0	0	1	0
Wrexham	1954–55	Third Division North	12	0	0	0	12	0
Career total			13	0	0	0	13	0
