= 1954 All-Ireland Minor Football Championship =

Gaelic football competition

All-Ireland Champions
- Winning team: Dublin (3rd win)

All-Ireland Finalists
- Losing team: Kerry

Provincial Champions
- Munster: Kerry
- Leinster: Dublin
- Ulster: Armagh
- Connacht: Mayo

The 1954 All-Ireland Minor Football Championship was the 23rd staging of the All-Ireland Minor Football Championship, the Gaelic Athletic Association's premier inter-county Gaelic football tournament for boys under the age of 18.

Mayo entered the championship as defending champions, however, they were defeated by Dublin in the All-Ireland semi-final.

On 26 September 1954, Dublin won the championship following a 3-3 to 1-8 defeat of Kerry in the All-Ireland final. This was their third All-Ireland title overall and their first in nine championship seasons.

== Results ==
=== Connacht Minor Football Championship ===
Quarter-Final

Mayo 1-7 Sligo 0-2.

Semi-Finals

Sligo 2-3 Leitrim 0-8.

Galway 2-13 Mayo 3-5.

Final

Mayo beat Sligo.

=== All-Ireland Minor Football Championship ===
Semi-Finals

Dublin 3-13 Mayo 0-7.

Final

26 September 1954 Final	Dublin	3-03 - 1-08	Kerry	Croke Park, Dublin
