= 1947–48 Southern Football League =

Southern Football League
- Season: 1947–48
- Champions: Merthyr Tydfil
- Matches: 306
- Goals: 1,132 (3.7 per match)

The 1947–48 Southern Football League season was the 45th in the history of the league, an English football competition. A total of 18 clubs contested the league, including 16 clubs from previous season, and two new clubs, Lovells Athletic and Torquay United II. Merthyr Tydfil were champions, winning their first Southern League title. Eight Southern League clubs applied to join the Football League at the end of the season, but none were successful.

== League table ==
Pos	Team	Pld	W	D	L	GF	GA	GR	Pts
1	Merthyr Tydfil	34	23	7	4	84	38	2.211	53
2	Gillingham	34	21	5	8	81	43	1.884	47
3	Worcester City	34	21	3	10	74	45	1.644	45
4	Colchester United	34	17	10	7	88	41	2.146	44
5	Hereford United	34	16	10	8	77	53	1.453	42
6	Lovells Athletic	34	17	6	11	74	50	1.480	40
7	Exeter City II	34	15	7	12	65	57	1.140	37
8	Yeovil Town	34	12	11	11	56	50	1.120	35
9	Chelmsford City	34	14	7	13	62	58	1.069	35
10	Cheltenham Town	34	13	9	12	71	71	1.000	35
11	Bath City	34	12	8	14	55	62	0.887	32
12	Barry Town	34	10	9	15	60	70	0.857	29
13	Gravesend & Northfleet	34	11	6	17	52	81	0.642	28
14	Guildford City	34	11	4	19	69	74	0.932	26
15	Dartford	34	10	6	18	35	62	0.565	26
16	Gloucester City	34	8	6	20	45	78	0.577	22
17	Torquay United II	34	6	9	19	43	95	0.453	21
18	Bedford Town	34	6	3	25	41	104	0.394	15

Source: rsssf.com
Rules for classification: 1) points; 2) goal ratio.

== Football League elections ==
Eight Southern League clubs applied to join the Football League, but all four League clubs were re-elected.

Club	League	Votes
Brighton & Hove Albion	Football League	47
Norwich City	Football League	47
Halifax Town	Football League	47
New Brighton	Football League	38
Shrewsbury Town	Midland League	8
Colchester United	Southern League	2
Scunthorpe United	Midland League	2
Gillingham	Southern League	1
Worcester City	Southern League	1
South Liverpool	Cheshire League	1
Bath City	Southern League	0
Bridgend Town	Welsh National League (South)	0
Chelmsford City	Southern League	0
Lovells Athletic	Southern League	0
Merthyr Tydfil	Southern League	0
Peterborough United	Midland League	0
Yeovil Town	Southern League	0
Nelson	Lancashire Combination	0
North Shields	North Eastern League	0
Northwich Victoria	Cheshire League	0
Wigan Athletic	Lancashire Combination	0
Workington	North Eastern League	0
