= 1948–49 Carlisle United F.C. season =

Carlisle United F.C.
1948–49 season
- Manager: Ivor Broadis (to January); Bill Shankly (from January)
- Stadium: Brunton Park
- Third Division North: 15th
- FA Cup: First round
Home colours

For the 1948–49 season, Carlisle United F.C. competed in Football League Third Division North.

== Results & fixtures ==
=== Football League Third Division North ===
==== League table ====
Pos	Team	Pld	W	D	L	GF	GA	GAv	Pts
13	Barrow	42	14	12	16	41	48	0.854	40
14	York City	42	15	9	18	74	74	1.000	39
15	Carlisle United	42	14	11	17	60	77	0.779	39
16	Hartlepools United	42	14	10	18	45	58	0.776	38
17	New Brighton	42	14	8	20	46	58	0.793	36

Source: rsssf.com

==== Matches ====
Match Day	Date	Opponent	H/A	Score	Carlisle United Scorer(s)	Attendance
1	21 August	Chester	H	2–1		
2	25 August	New Brighton	A	0–2		
3	28 August	Southport	A	2–2		
4	2 September	New Brighton	H	2–2		
5	4 September	Crewe Alexandra	H	6–2		
6	7 September	Rochdale	A	0–1		
7	11 September	York City	A	0–6		
8	16 September	Rochdale	H	1–1		
9	18 September	Stockport County	H	2–1		
10	25 September	Doncaster Rovers	A	0–2		
11	2 October	Gateshead	A	0–3		
12	9 October	Bradford City	H	3–2		
13	16 October	Halifax Town	A	4–3		
14	23 October	Wrexham	H	3–2		
15	30 October	Barrow	A	0–0		
16	6 November	Mansfield Town	H	3–1		
17	13 November	Tranmere Rovers	A	1–2		
18	20 November	Oldham Athletic	H	2–0		
19	4 December	Rotherham United	H	1–8		
20	18 December	Chester	A	1–2		
21	25 December	Darlington	A	2–2		
22	27 December	Darlington	H	0–2		
23	1 January	Southport	H	4–2		
24	15 January	Crewe Alexandra	A	0–3		
25	22 January	York City	H	3–3		
26	29 January	Accrington Stanley	A	1–2		
27	5 February	Stockport County	A	0–2		
28	19 February	Doncaster Rovers	H	3–0		
29	26 February	Gateshead	H	2–1		
30	5 March	Bradford City	A	2–1		
31	12 March	Halifax Town	H	0–0		
32	19 March	Wrexham	A	0–4		
33	23 March	Hull City	A	0–3		
34	26 March	Barrow	H	2–0		
35	2 April	Mansfield Town	A	0–2		
36	9 April	Tranmere Rovers	H	2–2		
37	15 April	Hartlepools United	A	0–1		
38	16 April	Oldham Athletic	A	0–1		
39	18 April	Hartlepools United	H	0–0		
40	23 April	Accrington Stanley	H	4–1		
41	30 April	Rotherham United	A	1–1		
42	7 May	Hull City	H	1–1		

=== FA Cup ===
Round	Date	Opponent	H/A	Score	Carlisle United Scorer(s)	Attendance
R1	27 November	New Brighton	A	0–1		
