= Patsy Breen =

Derry Gaelic footballer

Personal information
- Occupation: Primary school principal (retired)

Sport
- Sport: Gaelic football
- Position: Right half back
Clubs
- Years: Club
- Desertmartin; Coleraine
Club titles
- Derry titles: 1
Inter-county
- Years: County
- 1950–1960: Derry
Inter-county titles
- Ulster titles: 1

Patsy Breen was a former Gaelic footballer who played for St Martin's GAC, Desertmartin and the Derry county team between 1950 and 1960. In 1958 Breen was part of the first Derry team to win the Ulster Senior Football Championship, which finished runners-up in that year's All-Ireland Senior Football Championship.

Breen is regarded as the Desertmartin club's best-ever player. He was on the club team that won the Derry Senior Football Championship in 1953.

He usually played as right half back, and also played in midfield on occasion early in his career. Breen went on to manage a number of teams after retiring.

== Personal life ==
Breen was from Desertmartin, County Londonderry, Northern Ireland. After leaving primary school, he attended St Patrick's Grammar School in Armagh. He later attended St Mary's University College and Queen's University, both in Belfast. He was a primary school principal in Moneymore for many years. Breen served as Chairman of the Derry County Board from 1972 until 1975.

Patsy breen died in causeway hospital coleraine on 17 April 2024 aged 91 Sadly, missed by his wife Rosemary and all the family.

== Playing career ==
=== Club ===
Breen had little success with Desertmartin at underage level. Desertmartin reached the 1951 and 1952 Derry Senior Football Championship finals, but lost both, to Dungiven and Éire Óg respectively. However, in 1953 Breen helped Desertmartin win the club's first (and so far only) Derry Senior Championship title. They defeated Ballerin in the decider. Desertmartin were also beaten in the 1959 final.

He also played for Coleraine briefly.

=== Inter-county ===
Breen played with the Derry Minor team before making his way onto the Senior panel. He made his Senior debut in a 1950 Dr. Lagan Cup game - ironically as a corner forward.

In 1955 Breen was part of the Derry team that reached the Ulster Senior Football Championship final for the first time in 34 years. They were beaten by Cavan by three points. Derry reached the decider again two years later, only to lose by two points to Tyrone.

In 1958 Breen was part of Derry's first ever Ulster Championship winning team, beating Down in the final by four points (1–11 to 2–04). On 24 August, Derry caused one of the biggest shocks in the history of Gaelic football when the first-time Ulster Champions beat Kerry in the All-Ireland semi-final 2–06 to 2–05. They met Dublin in the All-Ireland final but Derry were defeated. It has been claimed a series of poor refereeing decisions in that game cost Derry greatly. The 1950s was a decade of very high standards of football and was a very difficult era to win an All-Ireland, with the likes of Mayo, Galway, Kerry, Louth, Cavan, Meath and Dublin having very strong teams at the time Patsy's 1st anniversary Mass was celebrated on 12 April at 7.30pm in St Patrick's Church, Keenaught, Desertmartin..

He played on for Derry until 1960.

=== School and college ===
Breen attended St Pat's, Armagh.

While at St Pat's, he played Gaelic football, representing the school.

He also played football for St Mary's and QUB.

== Management career ==
Among his managerial successes are leading Ardboe O'Donovan Rossa to four Tyrone Senior Football Championship titles, including three in a row between 1971 ad 1973.

== Honours ==
=== Club ===
- Derry Senior Football Championship:
  - Winner (1): 1953
  - Runner up: 1951, 1952, 1959

=== Inter-county ===
- All-Ireland Senior Football Championship:
  - Runner up: 1958
- National Football League:
  - Runner up: 1958-1959??
- Ulster Senior Football Championship:
  - Winner (1): 1958
  - Runner up: 1955, 1957

== See also ==
- List of Derry inter-county footballers
