= Mike Fields =

English footballer

Personal information
- Full name: Maurice John Bernard Fields
- Date of birth: 12 August 1935
- Place of birth: Chester, England
- Date of death: 27 May 2014 (aged 78)
- Place of death: Chester, England
- Position: Forward

Youth career
- 1953–1956: Chester

Senior career*
Years	Team	Apps	(Gls)
1956–1959	Chester	22	(1)
1959–19??	Borough United		
- * Club domestic league appearances and goals

Maurice John Bernard Fields (12 August 1935 – 27 May 2014), known as Mike or Mickey Fields, was an English footballer who played in the Football League for Chester.

== Playing career ==
A forward, Fields was offered a trial at Nottingham Forest as a youngster but accepted an offer from his hometown club of Chester to begin playing for their junior side.

Fields broke into Chester's first–team late in 1955–56, with his first and only league goal following against Chesterfield in September 1956. A year later he helped create history by scoring Chester's winner against Burnley in the final of the Lancashire Senior Cup as they became the first club from outside Lancashire to win the competition.

Fields soon began to suffer cartilage problems, leading to his release by the club in May 1959 as he joined Borough United.

Fields remained a part-timer throughout his career at Chester, working for Shell where he continued to be employed after his playing days ended.
