= 1947–48 Northern Football League =

The 1947–48 Northern Football League season was the 50th in the history of the Northern Football League, a football competition in Northern England.

== Clubs ==
Northern League
- Season: 1947–48
- Champions: Ferryhill Athletic
- Matches: 182
- Goals: 829 (4.55 per match)

The league featured 13 clubs which competed in the last season, along with one new club:

- East Tanfield Colliery Welfare

=== League table ===
Pos	Team	Pld	W	D	L	GF	GA	GR	Pts	Promotion or relegation
1	Ferryhill Athletic	26	20	4	2	90	40	2.250	44	
2	Bishop Auckland	26	17	3	6	90	41	2.195	37	
3	South Bank	26	13	7	6	61	40	1.525	33	
4	Shildon	26	15	0	11	52	51	1.020	30	
5	Evenwood Town	26	12	5	9	53	44	1.205	29	
6	Stanley United	26	10	7	9	60	62	0.968	27	
7	Tow Law Town	26	12	3	11	58	61	0.951	27	
8	Crook Colliery Welfare	26	12	3	11	53	58	0.914	27	
9	Willington	26	11	3	12	53	54	0.981	25	
10	West Auckland Town	26	8	5	13	57	73	0.781	21	
11	East Tanfield Colliery Welfare	26	7	5	14	52	67	0.776	19	Left the league
12	Whitby Town	26	8	3	15	52	76	0.684	19	
13	Heaton Stannington	26	4	7	15	47	66	0.712	15	
14	Billingham Synthonia	26	5	1	20	51	96	0.531	11	

Source: fchd
Rules for classification: 1) points; 2) goal ratio.
