= Des Lacey =

Irish footballer

Personal information
- Full name: Desmond Lacey
- Date of birth: 3 August 1925
- Place of birth: Dublin, Ireland
- Date of death: 1974 (age 48-49)
- Position: Winger

Senior career*
Years	Team	Apps	(Gls)
	Chester	1	(0)
- Witton Albion
- Altrincham
1949	Macclesfield Town	8	(0)
- * Club domestic league appearances and goals

Desmond "Des" Lacey (3 August 1925 – 1974) was an Irish footballer.

Lacey made one appearance for Chester in the Football League, when he wore the number seven shirt during a 3–0 victory at home to Lincoln City in April 1947. Despite this success, he was not selected again and he moved to Witton Albion. Lacey excelled also in badminton.

== Bibliography ==
- Sumner, Chas (1997). On the Borderline: The Official History of Chester City F.C. 1885-1997. Yore Publications. ISBN 978-1-874427-52-0.
