= 1982–83 FA Trophy =

1982-83 FA Trophy
FA Challenge Trophy

Tournament details
- Country: England; Wales
- Teams: 214

Final positions
- Champions: Telford United
- Runners-up: Northwich Victoria

The 1982–83 FA Trophy was the fourteenth season of the FA Trophy.

== Preliminary round ==
=== Ties ===
Tie	Home team	Score	Away team
1	Alfreton Town	1-3	Accrington Stanley
2	Arnold	3-0	Long Eaton United
3	Banbury United	1-4	Dunstable
4	Canterbury City	1-0	Farnborough Town
5	Cheshunt	1-0	Boreham Wood
6	Curzon Ashton	2-1	Bridlington Trinity
7	Darlaston	1-2	Boston
8	Dudley Town	0-0	Spalding United
9	Emley	5-3	Fleetwood Town
10	Feltham	3-1	Sheppey United
11	Heanor Town	2-3	Bootle
12	Hednesford Town	2-2	Rhyl
13	Hounslow	5-2	Hampton
14	Lye Town	1-1	Redditch United
15	Maesteg Park	1-1	Bromsgrove Rovers
16	Melksham Town	2-1	Andover
17	Metropolitan Police	4-0	Ashford Town (Kent)
18	Milton Keynes City	0-5	Wembley
19	Salisbury	1-1	Barnstaple Town
20	Sittingbourne	1-4	Folkestone
21	Sudbury Town	0-2	Hillingdon Borough
22	Tilbury	6-0	Cambridge City
23	Walton & Hersham	0-5	Kingstonian
24	Welton Rovers	0-0	Ton Pentre

=== Replays ===
Tie	Home team	Score	Away team
8	Spalding United	1-2	Dudley Town
12	Rhyl	1-0	Hednesford Town
14	Redditch United	1-0	Lye Town
15	Bromsgrove Rovers	2-0	Maesteg Park
19	Barnstaple Town	2-0	Salisbury
24	Ton Pentre	1-0	Welton Rovers

== First qualifying round ==
=== Ties ===
Tie	Home team	Score	Away team
1	Ashton United	0-0	Droylsden
2	Aveley	2-1	St Albans City
3	Barnstaple Town	2-3	Keynsham Town
4	Basingstoke Town	0-2	Lewes
5	Bedworth United	7-3	Sutton Coldfield Town
6	Bideford	1-1	Ton Pentre
7	Boston	1-1	A P Leamington
8	Bridgwater Town	2-0	Dawlish Town
9	Bromley	3-2	Welling United
10	Buxton	0-2	Curzon Ashton
11	Canterbury City	2-2	Crawley Town
12	Cheshunt	1-1	Hillingdon Borough
13	Cinderford	1-2	Weston super Mare
14	Clandown	1-0	Bridport
15	Colwyn Bay	2-1	Leek Town
16	Consett	4-1	Crook Town
17	Corby Town	1-0	Oxford City
18	Dover	1-1	Epsom & Ewell
19	Durham City	5-1	Formby
20	Eastwood Town	4-1	Grantham
21	Emley	3-8	Hyde United
22	Enderby Town	4-2	Hounslow
23	Fareham Town	2-3	Kingstonian
24	Ferryhill Athletic – Bye		
25	Frome Town	4-1	Taunton Town
26	Gateshead	3-1	Whitley Bay
27	Glossop	1-1	Arnold
28	Goole Town	9-1	Evenwood Town
29	Hayes	2-1	Billericay Town
30	Hertford Town – Bye		
31	Highgate United	0-2	Bromsgrove Rovers
32	Horden Colliery Welfare	4-1	Willington
33	Hornchurch	1-0	Ware
34	Ilkeston Town	3-1	Gainsborough Trinity
35	King's Lynn	5-0	Lowestoft Town
36	Maidenhead United	3-2	Bognor Regis Town
37	Mangotsfield United	0-2	Bridgend Town
38	Matlock Town	3-2	Prescot Cables
39	Metropolitan Police	5-0	Staines Town
40	Moor Green	3-0	Macclesfield Town
41	Nantwich Town	3-1	Brereton Social
42	Netherfield	1-2	Burscough
43	Oswestry Town	0-1	Bilston
44	Penrith	5-0	Accrington Stanley
45	Poole Town	2-0	Feltham
46	Redditch United	1-1	Dudley Town
47	Rossendale United	0-0	Tow Law Town
48	Shepton Mallet Town	1-1	Melksham Town
49	Shildon	2-2	Horwich R M I
50	South Liverpool	4-0	Mexborough Town Athletic
51	Southport	2-1	Billingham Synthonia
52	Stourbridge	0-0	Rhyl
53	Sutton Town	3-2	Worksop Town
54	Tamworth	1-1	Belper Town
55	Thanet United	2-2	Folkestone
56	Tilbury	1-1	Chesham United
57	Tonbridge	1-2	Wokingham Town
58	Waterlooville	2-1	Chatham Town
59	Wellingborough Town	2-1	Dunstable
60	Wembley	2-3	Harrow Borough
61	West Auckland Town	1-3	North Shields
62	Witney Town	2-2	Chelmsford City
63	Workington	2-0	Bootle
64	Worthing	1-0	Addlestone & Weybridge Town

=== Replays ===
Tie	Home team	Score	Away team
1	Droylsden	1-1	Ashton United
6	Ton Pentre	0-2	Bideford
7	A P Leamington	6-0	Boston
11	Crawley Town	2-1	Canterbury City
12	Hillingdon Borough	2-0	Cheshunt
18	Epsom & Ewell	0-2	Dover
27	Arnold	2-3	Glossop
46	Dudley Town	2-0	Redditch United
47	Tow Law Town	3-1	Rossendale United
48	Melksham Town	2-1	Shepton Mallet Town
49	Horwich R M I	1-3	Shildon
52	Rhyl	2-0	Stourbridge
54	Belper Town	4-1	Tamworth
55	Folkestone	8-0	Thanet United
56	Chesham United	0-1	Tilbury
62	Chelmsford City	1-0	Witney Town

=== 2nd replay ===
Tie	Home team	Score	Away team
1	Droylsden	1-5	Ashton United

== Second qualifying round ==
=== Ties ===
Tie	Home team	Score	Away team
1	Bedworth United	1-2	Bromsgrove Rovers
2	Belper Town	4-1	Moor Green
3	Bideford	2-0	Frome Town
4	Bilston	3-0	A P Leamington
5	Chelmsford City	2-2	Aveley
6	Consett	2-2	South Liverpool
7	Corby Town	2-0	Curzon Ashton
8	Crawley Town	4-2	Hertford Town
9	Eastwood Town	2-2	Colwyn Bay
10	Enderby Town	2-1	Ashton United
11	Ferryhill Athletic	1-4	Tow Law Town
12	Goole Town	4-2	North Shields
13	Harrow Borough	3-2	Wellingborough Town
14	Hillingdon Borough	0-1	Bromley
15	Horden Colliery Welfare	5-0	Durham City
16	Ilkeston Town	2-0	Nantwich Town
17	Keynsham Town	0-2	Bridgwater Town
18	King's Lynn	2-0	Dover
19	Kingstonian	0-1	Lewes
20	Maidenhead United	0-3	Hayes
21	Matlock Town	5-2	Hyde United
22	Metropolitan Police	1-0	Folkestone
23	Penrith	4-1	Shildon
24	Poole Town	3-0	Melksham Town
25	Rhyl	3-1	Glossop
26	Southport	2-0	Gateshead
27	Sutton Town	3-0	Dudley Town
28	Waterlooville	4-2	Clandown
29	Weston-super-Mare	2-0	Bridgend Town
30	Wokingham Town	2-3	Tilbury
31	Workington	0-0	Burscough
32	Worthing	2-1	Hornchurch

=== Replays ===
Tie	Home team	Score	Away team
5	Aveley	0-1	Chelmsford City
6	South Liverpool	3-0	Consett
9	Colwyn Bay	3-2	Eastwood Town
31	Burscough	2-0	Workington

== Third qualifying round ==
=== Ties ===
Tie	Home team	Score	Away team
1	Alvechurch	2-2	Stalybridge Celtic
2	Barnet	2-1	Metropolitan Police
3	Bideford	2-2	Weston-super-Mare
4	Bilston	2-1	Walthamstow Avenue
5	Bridgwater Town	0-1	Dorchester Town
6	Bromley	4-0	Trowbridge Town
7	Burscough	4-1	Lancaster City
8	Burton Albion	2-0	Belper Town
9	Carshalton Athletic	1-0	Worthing
10	Chelmsford City	1-1	Harrow Borough
11	Crawley Town	1-6	Croydon
12	Frickley Athletic	1-1	Colwyn Bay
13	Gloucester City	4-1	Minehead
14	Goole Town	1-0	Morecambe
15	Gravesend & Northfleet	1-1	Maidstone United
16	Hayes	1-0	Harlow Town
17	Hendon	0-3	Tilbury
18	Hitchin Town	1-4	Corby Town
19	Kettering Town	2-2	Barking
20	King's Lynn	3-0	Bromsgrove Rovers
21	Leatherhead	2-5	Waterlooville
22	Lewes	1-0	Tooting & Mitcham United
23	Merthyr Tydfil	1-2	Cheltenham Town
24	Penrith	1-0	South Bank
25	Poole Town	0-1	Dulwich Hamlet
26	Rhyl	2-1	Enderby Town
27	Spennymoor United	5-0	Southport
28	Sutton Town	1-1	Chorley
29	Tow Law Town	3-1	Horden Colliery Welfare
30	Whitby Town	2-1	South Liverpool
31	Winsford United	0-2	Matlock Town
32	Witton Albion	1-1	Ilkeston Town

=== Replays ===
Tie	Home team	Score	Away team
1	Stalybridge Celtic	2-0	Alvechurch
3	Weston-super-Mare	3-2	Bideford
10	Harrow Borough	2-1	Chelmsford City
12	Colwyn Bay	2-0	Frickley Athletic
15	Maidstone United	3-0	Gravesend & Northfleet
19	Barking	0-0	Kettering Town
28	Chorley	4-0	Sutton Town
32	Ilkeston Town	3-1	Witton Albion

=== 2nd replay ===
Tie	Home team	Score	Away team
19	Barking	0-2	Kettering Town

== 1st round ==
The teams that given byes to this round are Enfield, Runcorn, Telford United, Worcester City, Dagenham, Northwich Victoria, Scarborough, Barrow, Weymouth, Boston United, Altrincham, Bath City, Yeovil Town, Stafford Rangers, Wealdstone, Nuneaton Borough, Bangor City, Dartford, Bishop's Stortford, Wycombe Wanderers, Marine, Blyth Spartans, Mossley, Sutton United, Woking, Ashington, Hastings United, Aylesbury United, Slough Town, Kidderminster Harriers, Leytonstone Ilford and Bishop Auckland.

=== Ties ===
Tie	Home team	Score	Away team
1	Ashington	1-0	Burscough
2	Bangor City	1-1	King's Lynn
3	Barrow	2-1	Rhyl
4	Bath City	1-2	Worcester City
5	Bishop Auckland	1-3	Nuneaton Borough
6	Boston United	3-0	Marine
7	Burton Albion	0-1	Telford United
8	Colwyn Bay	1-5	Chorley
9	Corby Town	1-1	Altrincham
10	Dorchester Town	3-2	Gloucester City
11	Dulwich Hamlet	4-2	Kettering Town
12	Enfield	2-1	Bishop's Stortford
13	Goole Town	1-1	Mossley
14	Harrow Borough	2-0	Bromley
15	Hastings United	0-2	Croydon
16	Hayes	0-1	Leytonstone Ilford
17	Kidderminster Harriers	0-3	Northwich Victoria
18	Lewes	0-2	Dartford
19	Maidstone United	1-0	Aylesbury United
20	Matlock Town	0-1	Tow Law Town
21	Penrith	1-2	Stalybridge Celtic
22	Runcorn	0-1	Scarborough
23	Slough Town	0-1	Dagenham
24	Spennymoor United	2-1	Bilston
25	Stafford Rangers	2-2	Ilkeston Town
26	Tilbury	2-1	Cheltenham Town
27	Waterlooville	1-2	Carshalton Athletic
28	Weston-super-Mare	0-0	Weymouth
29	Whitby Town	2-3	Blyth Spartans
30	Woking	0-2	Barnet
31	Wycombe Wanderers	2-1	Wealdstone
32	Yeovil Town	2-4	Sutton United

=== Replays ===
Tie	Home team	Score	Away team
2	King's Lynn	0-2	Bangor City
9	Altrincham	6-0	Corby Town
13	Mossley	2-0	Goole Town
25	Ilkeston Town	3-2	Stafford Rangers
28	Weymouth	1-0	Weston-super-Mare

== 2nd round ==
=== Ties ===
Tie	Home team	Score	Away team
1	Ashington	1-1	Barrow
2	Bangor City	1-0	Mossley
3	Barnet	1-2	Ilkeston Town
4	Blyth Spartans	3-2	Nuneaton Borough
5	Carshalton Athletic	2-3	Tilbury
6	Chorley	0-0	Dartford
7	Dorchester Town	2-3	Enfield
8	Harrow Borough	4-1	Sutton United
9	Maidstone United	2-2	Dulwich Hamlet
10	Northwich Victoria	1-0	Croydon
11	Spennymoor United	0-0	Telford United
12	Stalybridge Celtic	1-3	Scarborough
13	Tow Law Town	2-2	Altrincham
14	Weymouth	1-0	Leytonstone Ilford
15	Worcester City	0-3	Dagenham
16	Wycombe Wanderers	0-0	Boston United

=== Replays ===
Tie	Home team	Score	Away team
1	Barrow	1-0	Ashington
6	Dartford	3-0	Chorley
9	Dulwich Hamlet	0-3	Maidstone United
11	Telford United	2-1	Spennymoor United
13	Altrincham	3-0	Tow Law Town
16	Boston United	1-1	Wycombe Wanderers

=== 2nd replay ===
Tie	Home team	Score	Away team
16	Wycombe Wanderers	0-2	Boston United

== 3rd round ==
=== Ties ===
Tie	Home team	Score	Away team
1	Barrow	1-1	Harrow Borough
2	Blyth Spartans	2-0	Altrincham
3	Boston United	2-1	Maidstone United
4	Dagenham	3-0	Weymouth
5	Dartford	2-0	Tilbury
6	Ilkeston Town	1-5	Enfield
7	Northwich Victoria	1-1	Bangor City
8	Telford United	3-0	Scarborough

=== Replays ===
Tie	Home team	Score	Away team
1	Harrow Borough	1-1	Barrow
7	Bangor City	2-2	Northwich Victoria

=== 2nd replays ===
Tie	Home team	Score	Away team
1	Barrow	0-2	Harrow Borough
7	Northwich Victoria	1-0	Bangor City

== 4th round ==
=== Ties ===
Tie	Home team	Score	Away team
1	Blyth Spartans	1-1	Northwich Victoria
2	Dagenham	2-1	Boston United
3	Harrow Borough	5-1	Enfield
4	Telford United	4-1	Dartford

=== Replay ===
Tie	Home team	Score	Away team
1	Northwich Victoria	3-2	Blyth Spartans

== Semi finals ==
=== First leg ===
Tie	Home team	Score	Away team
1	Northwich Victoria	3-2	Dagenham
2	Telford United	0-2	Harrow Borough

=== Second leg ===
Tie	Home team	Score	Away team	Aggregate
1	Dagenham	0-1	Northwich Victoria	2-4
2	Harrow Borough	1-5	Telford United	3-5

== Final ==
Home team	Score	Away team
Telford United	2-1	Northwich Victoria
