= Tommy Best =

Welsh footballer (1920–2018)

Personal information
- Full name: Thomas Hubert Best
- Date of birth: 23 December 1920
- Place of birth: Milford Haven, Wales
- Date of death: 16 September 2018 (aged 97)
- Place of death: Hereford, England
- Position: Centre forward

Youth career
- Milford Haven United

Senior career*
| Years | Team | Apps | (Gls) |
- Cliftonville
- Belfast Celtic
| 1947–1948 | Chester | 40 | (14) |
| 1948–1949 | Cardiff City | 28 | (11) |
| 1949–1950 | Queens Park Rangers | 13 | (3) |
| 1950–1955 | Hereford United | | |
- Bromsgrove Rovers
| Total | | 81 | (28) |
- * Club domestic league appearances and goals

Thomas Hubert Best (23 December 1920 – 16 September 2018) was a Welsh professional footballer who played as a centre forward. A veteran of the Second World War, serving in the Royal Navy, he made over 70 appearances in the Football League for Chester, Cardiff City and Queens Park Rangers. Best was the first black professional footballer to play at the top level in Ireland and was also the first black player to appear for Chester and Hereford in the Football League.

== Early life ==
Best was born in Milford Haven to a Barbadian father and Welsh mother.

== Career ==
=== Ireland ===
Best joined the Royal Navy as a teenager and during World War II was stationed aboard HMS Gloman, a minesweeper vessel. When the ship was damaged by a German air raid, it docked in Pollock Dock at Belfast Harbour and the chief petty officer on the ship introduced Best to the football teams in the area. Best attended a match between Belfast Celtic and Drumcondra in the Dublin and Belfast Inter-City Cup at Grosvenor Park and was asked to play when Drumcondra proved to be short of a full team. He played against Ireland international Bertie Fulton in the match, scoring one of Drumcondra's goals, and impressed enough to be offered a deal with Belfast Celtic. He was given the nickname "Darkie Best" during his spell at the club, although Best maintained that any reference to his skin colour was affectionate, later stating: "I was never subjected to racial comments by anybody – team-mates, officials or supporters. Indeed, I looked upon Belfast as my second home". By playing for Celtic, Best became the first black professional player to appear at the top level in Ireland at the age of 19. He spent one season with the club, playing alongside internationals such as Jimmy McAlinden and Norman Kernaghan. Best also played for fellow Irish side Cliftonville and went on to play football in Queensland, Australia after being stationed there.

=== Football League ===
In July 1947, Best joined Chester after a successful trial, making his move into the professional game at the late age of 26 due to the hostilities. He made a goalscoring debut for the club on 23 August 1947 in a 2–1 win over Oldham Athletic, becoming the first black player to represent the Blues in the Football League. He scored 14 goals in 40 league appearances for Chester and, after his first season, attracted attention from a number of clubs, including Blackpool and Blackburn Rovers, but eventually chose a move to Cardiff City for a fee of £7,000 as it was the closest to his hometown. His fee was a club record sale for Chester at the time and would stand until the sale of Billy Foulkes to Newcastle United in 1951. He made his debut for the club in a 2–0 defeat to West Bromwich Albion on 30 October 1948, playing five consecutive matches before dropping out of the first team. He was restored to the side at the end of the 1948–49 season, scoring his first goal in a 4–0 victory over West Ham United on 12 March 1949. He played in the last thirteen matches of the season, scoring six times.

The following season, Best began the campaign as the club's first choice striker and scored five goals in his first eight appearances. However, he dropped out of favour and, having spent just over one season at Ninian Park, he made his final appearance for the club in a 2–0 defeat to Sheffield United in November 1949 before joining Queens Park Rangers. During his time with Cardiff, he was informed by the management team that he was expected to be called up to represent Wales at international level in the absence of the injured Trevor Ford but was overlooked. Best later stated his belief that he was ignored due to the colour of his skin, commenting "You have to remember that black players were a rarity [...] I'm forced to the conclusion that I was a victim of prejudice."

He later had spells with non-league sides Milford Haven, Hereford United, where he made over 100 appearances, and Bromsgrove Rovers.

== Later life ==
Following his retirement from football, Best worked in a Mother's Pride bakery. He retired to live in Hereford with his wife, Eunice, and the couple had three children, Jennifer, Paul and Judy. He suffered from Alzheimer's disease in later life and died on 16 September 2018 at the age of 97.
