= Dennis Selby =

Welsh footballer

Personal information
- Date of birth: 15 October 1920
- Place of birth: Broughton, Wales
- Date of death: 5 August 1969 (aged 48)
- Place of death: Chester, England
- Position: Winger

Senior career*
Years	Team	Apps	(Gls)
1946–1947	Chester	5	(1)
- * Club domestic league appearances and goals

Dennis Selby (15 October 1920 – 5 August 1969) was a Welsh footballer, who played as a winger in the Football League for Chester.
