= Charlie Higgins (Gaelic footballer) =

Irish former Gaelic footballer

Chuck Higgins
Sport
- Sport: Gaelic football

Chuck Higgins is an Irish former Gaelic footballer who played in the 1958 All-Ireland Final. He was known as Chuck.
