= Harry Colville =

Scottish footballer and manager

Henry Colville (12 February 1924 – 16 March 1999) was a Scottish football player and manager.

He played for Falkirk, Raith Rovers, Chester and Dunfermline Athletic. After retiring as a player in 1960, Colville managed Cowdenbeath from then until 1964.
