= Ron Hansell =

English footballer

Personal information
- Full name: Ronald Arthur Robert Hansell
- Date of birth: 3 October 1930
- Place of birth: Norwich, England
- Date of death: 8 February 2013 (aged 82)
- Place of death: Caister-on-Sea, England
- Position: Inside forward

Senior career*
Years	Team	Apps	(Gls)
1953–1956	Norwich City	29	(7)
1956–1957	Chester	36	(9)
- * Club domestic league appearances and goals

Ronald Arthur Robert Hansell (3 October 1930 – 8 February 2013) was a footballer who played as an inside forward in the Football League for Norwich City and Chester.
