= Joe Brown (footballer, born 1920) =

English footballer

Personal information
- Full name: Joseph Samuel Brown
- Date of birth: 7 May 1920
- Place of birth: Bebington, England
- Date of death: May 2004 (aged 83–84)
- Place of death: Stoke-on-Trent,
- Position: Winger

Senior career*
| Years | Team | Apps | (Gls) |
- Port Sunlight
| 1947 | Chester | 15 | (2) |
- Runcorn
- * Club domestic league appearances and goals

Joseph Samuel Brown (7 May 1920 – May 2004) was an English footballer who played in the Football League as a winger for Chester. He was born in Bebington.
