= Derek Williams (footballer, born 1922) =

English footballer (1922–2019)

Personal information
- Full name: Herbert Derek Williams
- Date of birth: 9 December 1922
- Place of birth: Ellesmere Port, England
- Date of death: 13 July 2019 (aged 96)
- Place of death: Ellesmere Port, England
- Position: Wing half

Senior career*
Years	Team	Apps	(Gls)
1946–1947	Chester	2	(0)
- * Club domestic league appearances and goals

Herbert Derek Williams (9 December 1922 – 13 July 2019) was an English footballer, who played as a wing half in the Football League for Chester.
