= 1946–47 Southern Football League =

The 1946–47 Southern Football League season was the 44th in the history of the league, an English football competition.

The league featured eight new clubs, including Football League members Millwall, who also entered their first team in the Southern League. However, due to fixture congestion, they only played 24 matches, with the remaining fixtures all being awarded as 0–0 draws. Yeovil & Petters United were renamed Yeovil Town at the end of the previous season.

A total of 17 clubs contest the division, including nine clubs from previous season, three clubs missed previous season and five new clubs.

Clubs missed previous season:

- Dartford
- Gloucester City
- Guildford City

Newly elected clubs:

- Gravesend & Northfleet - new club, formed as a merger of Gravesend United and Northfleet United
- Gillingham - returned after resigning in 1939
- Merthyr Tydfil - runners-up of Welsh Football League
- Millwall
- Exeter City II

Gillingham were champions, winning their first Southern League title. At the end of the season Millwall resigned from the league.

== League table ==
Southern Football League
- Season: 1946–47
- Champions: Gillingham
- Matches: 272
- Goals: 1,250 (4.6 per match)

| Pos | Team | Pld | W | D | L | GF | GA | GR | Pts | Results |
|---|---|---|---|---|---|---|---|---|---|---|
| 1 | Gillingham | 32 | 20 | 7 | 5 | 103 | 45 | 2.289 | 47 | |
| 2 | Guildford City | 32 | 21 | 4 | 7 | 86 | 39 | 2.205 | 46 | |
| 3 | Merthyr Tydfil | 32 | 21 | 3 | 8 | 104 | 37 | 2.811 | 45 | |
| 4 | Yeovil Town | 32 | 19 | 6 | 7 | 100 | 49 | 2.041 | 44 | |
| 5 | Chelmsford City | 32 | 17 | 4 | 11 | 90 | 60 | 1.500 | 38 | |
| 6 | Gravesend & Northfleet | 32 | 17 | 4 | 11 | 82 | 58 | 1.414 | 38 | |
| 7 | Barry Town | 32 | 14 | 8 | 10 | 89 | 61 | 1.459 | 36 | |
| 8 | Colchester United | 32 | 15 | 5 | 12 | 65 | 60 | 1.083 | 35 | |
| 9 | Cheltenham Town | 32 | 14 | 4 | 14 | 68 | 75 | 0.907 | 32 | |
| 10 | Millwall | 32 | 8 | 13 | 11 | 59 | 57 | 1.035 | 29 | Resigned from the league |
| 11 | Dartford | 32 | 10 | 5 | 17 | 71 | 100 | 0.710 | 25 | |
| 12 | Bedford Town | 32 | 8 | 8 | 16 | 63 | 98 | 0.643 | 24 | |
| 13 | Hereford United | 32 | 8 | 7 | 17 | 37 | 85 | 0.435 | 23 | |
| 14 | Worcester City | 32 | 8 | 6 | 18 | 55 | 90 | 0.611 | 22 | |
| 15 | Exeter City II | 32 | 10 | 2 | 20 | 69 | 126 | 0.548 | 22 | |
| 16 | Bath City | 32 | 7 | 7 | 18 | 52 | 93 | 0.559 | 21 | |
| 17 | Gloucester City | 32 | 8 | 1 | 23 | 57 | 120 | 0.475 | 17 | |

Source: rsssf.com
Rules for classification: 1) points; 2) goal ratio.

== Football League elections ==
Barry Town, Bath City, Chelmsford City, Colchester United, Gillingham, Gravesend & Northfleet, Guildford City, Merthyr Tydfil, Worcester City and Yeovil Town were amongst 27 non-League clubs to apply for election to the Football League. However, as the two clubs relegated from Division Two to the regional divisions Three were both from the south, the Football League secretary had suggested that electing new members could create an imbalance in the divisions' geographical boundaries, and that instead all four clubs (Halifax, Mansfield, Norwich and Southport) should be re-elected en bloc. This was accepted and no elections took place.
