= Tommy Burden =

English footballer

Personal information
- Date of birth: 21 February 1924
- Place of birth: Andover, England
- Date of death: 2001 (aged 76–77)
- Place of death: Taunton, England
- Height: 1.73 m (5 ft 8 in)
- Position: Wing half

Youth career
- –1941: Wolverhampton Wanderers

Senior career*
| Years | Team | Apps | (Gls) |
| 1941–1945 | Wolverhampton Wanderers | 0 | (0) |
| 1945–1948 | Chester | 82 | (40) |
| 1948–1954 | Leeds United | 243 | (13) |
| 1954–1961 | Bristol City | 231 | (20) |
| Total | | 556 | (73) |
- * Club domestic league appearances and goals

Tommy Burden (21 February 1924 – 2001) was an English professional footballer who made over 500 league appearances for four teams over a twenty-year career.

== Career ==
Burden played for Wolverhampton Wanderers, Chester, Leeds United – where he was club captain from 1949 to 1954 – and Bristol City. He participated in the Normandy Landings, where he was injured.
