= Tommy Astbury =

Welsh footballer (1920–1993)

Personal information
- Full name: Thomas Arthur Astbury
- Date of birth: 9 February 1920
- Place of birth: Buckley, Flintshire, Wales
- Date of death: 19 October 1993 (aged 73)
- Place of death: Queensferry, Flintshire, Wales
- Positions: Wing half; forward

Youth career
- c. 1936–1938: Mold Alexandra

Senior career*
Years	Team	Apps	(Gls)
1938–1955	Chester	303	(38)

International career
1945	Wales (wartime)	2	(0)
- * Club domestic league appearances and goals

Thomas Astbury (9 February 1920 – 19 October 1993) was a Welsh professional footballer. Born in Buckley, Flintshire, he spent his entire professional career with Chester from 1938 to 1955. He is one of the club's top 10 Football League appearance holders with 303 such appearances to his name, with a high number of wartime league appearances having also been made.

== Playing career ==
Astbury, a wing half who also played as a forward, joined Chester as a part-time professional in 1938 after being spotted playing for Mold Alexandra. The outbreak of the Second World War the following year put his league career on hold but quickly shot Astbury into the first-team ranks, playing in the first wartime match against Liverpool. He went on to play regularly throughout the war years and was rewarded with two wartime Welsh caps against England in 1945. He also guested for Everton, Wrexham and Manchester United, playing for the latter in the northern final of the Football League War Cup.

When peacetime league football resumed in August 1946, Astbury was included in the Chester line-up at York City on the first day of the new season in a 4–4 draw. Later in the season he scored in a 2–0 FA Cup win against Plymouth Argyle that set up a fourth round tie with Stoke City, featuring Stanley Matthews. Astbury was involved in the goalless draw at a packed Sealand Road and the 3–2 defeat in the replay. He ended the season by scoring for Chester in their third and final Welsh Cup victory against Merthyr Tydfil.

One of Astbury's finest hours came against Hull City on 6 November 1948 when he performed superbly against the great Raich Carter despite being on the losing side. He remained prominently involved in the Chester side for most of his remaining years at the club, playing his final game in a 2–0 defeat against Rochdale on 11 April 1955. He retired from playing at the end of the season. While at Chester, Astbury had enjoyed a benefit match against Bolton Wanderers on 6 April 1949.

After leaving football, Astbury worked for a building supplies firm and was an ex-captain and lifelong vice-president of Hawarden Golf Club.

== Honours ==
Chester

- 1945–46: Football League Third Division North Cup runners-up
- 1946–47: Welsh Cup winners
- 1952–53: Welsh Cup runners-up
- 1953–54: Welsh Cup runners-up
- 1948–49: Benefit Match

Manchester United

- 1944–45: Football League War Cup runners-up (guest player)

== Bibliography ==
- Sumner, Chas (1997). On the Borderline: The Official History of Chester City F.C. 1885-1997. Yore Publications. ISBN 1-874427-52-6.
