= Bobby Hamilton (footballer) =

Scottish footballer

Personal information
- Full name: Robert Menzies Hamilton
- Date of birth: 25 April 1924
- Place of birth: Edinburgh, Scotland
- Date of death: November 1999 (aged 75)
- Place of death: Yeovil, Somerset, England
- Position: Outside forward

Youth career
- Hearts

Senior career*
Years	Team	Apps	(Gls)
1946–1948	Chester	68	(10)
- Yeovil Town
- * Club domestic league appearances and goals

Robert Menzies Hamilton (25 April 1924 – November 1999) was a professional footballer who played for Chester and Yeovil Town.
