= Charles Higgins (footballer) =

Scottish footballer (1921–1997)

Charlie Higgins
Personal information
- Date of birth: 12 May 1921
- Place of birth: Bellshill, Scotland
- Date of death: 30 January 1997 (aged 75)
- Place of death: Lenzie, Dunbartonshire, Scotland
- Position: Full back

Youth career
- 1942–1946: Greenock Morton

Senior career*
Years	Team	Apps	(Gls)
1946	Arbroath	1	(0)
1946–1947	Chester	11	(0)
1947–1948	Airdrieonians	8	(0)
1949–1954	Motherwell	30	(0)
1954–1955	Albion Rovers	3	(0)
1955–1956	East Stirlingshire	18	(0)
Total		71	(0)
- * Club domestic league appearances and goals

Charlie Higgins (12 May 1921 – 30 January 1997) was a Scottish footballer who played as a full back in the Football League for Chester.
