= Eric Lee (footballer) =

English footballer (1922–1999)

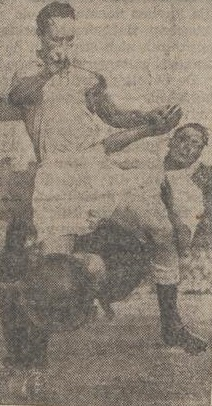
- McIlvenny in duel with Bram Appel at the 1948 Summer Olympics

Personal information
- Full name: Eric George Lee
- Date of birth: 18 October 1922
- Place of birth: Chester, England
- Date of death: June 1999 (aged 76)
- Place of death: Ottawa, Ontario, Canada
- Position: Defender

Senior career*
| Years | Team | Apps | (Gls) |
| 1946–1957 | Chester | 363 | (10) |

International career
| 1948 | Great Britain | | |
- * Club domestic league appearances and goals

Eric George Lee (18 October 1922 – June 1999) was an English professional footballer who played as a defender. He has made the fourth most Football League appearances for Chester, with 363 such appearances made from 1946 to 1957. He also played for Great Britain at the 1948 Summer Olympics. Eric was the father to hockey player and coach Peter John Lee.

== Playing career ==
Lee was recruited by his hometown club of Chester from local amateur football, becoming part of the first team during 1945–46 the final season of wartime league formats.

When Football League action resumed in August 1946, Lee was a regular in the first team side and his performances prompted a call up for the England amateur side against their Welsh counterparts. He missed much of the following season due to his teacher training course at Loughborough College but returned to the first team ranks in 1948–49 and remained a regular in the number five shirt until his final season of 1956–57. He retired at the end of the season, with his final appearance coming in a 2–0 win over Barrow on 29 April 1957.

Lee had enjoyed a benefit match between Chester and a Liverpool XI at Sealand Road on 30 April 1952, and played in four Welsh Cup finals. He left the club as their Football League record appearance holder, subsequently beaten by Ray Gill, Ron Hughes and Trevor Storton, but remains the highest Chester-born player in the club's appearance list.

== Personal life and death ==
Lee was an uncle of comedian Bob Mills.

During his playing career he was also a History teacher at Chester City Grammar School, where he was known as "Sticky" Lee.

Lee later emigrated to Canada, where he died in June 1999, at the age of 76.

== Honours ==
Chester

- 1945–46: Football League Third Division North Cup runners–up
- 1946–47: Welsh Cup winners
- 1952–53: Welsh Cup runners–up
- 1953–54: Welsh Cup runners–up
- 1954–55: Welsh Cup runners–up
- 1951–52: Benefit Match

== Bibliography ==
- Sumner, Chas (1997). On the Borderline: The Official History of Chester City F.C. 1885-1997. Yore Publications. ISBN 1-874427-52-6.
