= John Mulholland (footballer, born 1932) =

Scottish footballer

Personal information
- Full name: John Mulholland
- Date of birth: 20 January 1932
- Place of birth: Dumbarton, Scotland
- Date of death: 26 July 2000 (aged 68)
- Place of death: Southampton, England
- Position: Centre forward

Youth career
- Condorrat Thistle
- 1951–1956: Southampton

Senior career*
Years	Team	Apps	(Gls)
1956–1957	Chester	8	(1)
1957–1958	Halifax Town	8	(1)
- Lovells Athletic
Total		16	(2)
- * Club domestic league appearances and goals

John Mulholland (20 January 1932 – 26 July 2000) was a Scottish footballer, who played as a centre forward in the Football League for Chester and Halifax Town.

In 1958, he was involved in a car crash which ended his football career.
