= George Scales (footballer) =

English footballer

Personal information
- Date of birth: 14 March 1923
- Place of birth: Northwich, England
- Date of death: 1993 (aged 69–70)
- Place of death: Rhyl, Wales
- Position: Goalkeeper

Senior career*
Years	Team	Apps	(Gls)
1946–1949	Chester	81	(0)
- * Club domestic league appearances and goals

George Scales (14 March 1923 – June 1993) was an English footballer, who played as a goalkeeper in the Football League for Chester.

After retiring from football, Scales became a publican at the Pen Y Bryn Pub in Llanrwst.
