= Phil Turner (footballer, born 1927) =

English footballer (1927–2014)

Personal information
- Full name: Philip S. Turner
- Date of birth: 20 February 1927
- Place of birth: Frodsham, England
- Date of death: 22 October 2014 (aged 87)
- Place of death: Rhyl, Wales
- Position: Inside forward

Senior career*
Years	Team	Apps	(Gls)
1946–1947	Chester	27	(6)
1948–1951	Carlisle United	78	(24)
1951–1954	Bradford Park Avenue	55	(24)
1954–1955	Scunthorpe United	5	(2)
1955–1956	Accrington Stanley	14	(5)
1956–1957	Chester	16	(3)
1958–	Winsford United		
Total		195	(64)
- * Club domestic league appearances and goals

Philip S. Turner (20 February 1927 – 22 October 2014) was an English footballer who played as an inside forward in the Football League for Chester City, Carlisle United, Bradford Park Avenue, Scunthorpe United, Accrington Stanley (1891) and Winsford United. Turner died in Rhyl, Wales on 22 October 2014, at the age of 87.
