= Jimmy MacLaren =

Scottish footballer

Personal information
- Full name: James Scott MacLaren
- Date of birth: 26 November 1921
- Place of birth: Crieff, Scotland
- Date of death: 20 July 2004 (aged 82)
- Place of death: Blairgowrie, Scotland
- Position: Goalkeeper

Youth career
- Berwick Rangers

Senior career*
| Years | Team | Apps | (Gls) |
| 1946–1948 | Chester | 30 | (0) |
| 1948–1955 | Carlisle United | 262 | (0) |
| 1955–1956 | Berwick Rangers | 27 | (0) |
| Total | | 319 | (0) |
- * Club domestic league appearances and goals

Jimmy MacLaren (26 November 1921 – 20 July 2004) was a Scottish footballer, who played as a goalkeeper in the Football League for Chester and Carlisle United.
