= Frank Brown (footballer, born 1890) =

English footballer and manager

Personal information
- Date of birth: 1890
- Date of death: Unknown

Senior career*
Years	Team	Apps	(Gls)
1910-1914	Barnsley		(1914-1915)
1915-1919	Huddersfield Town		
1919-1921	Blackpool		
1921-1922	Exeter City		
1922-1923	Pontypridd		
1923-	Torquay United		

Managerial career
- 1932-1938: Torquay United
- 1938-1953: Chester
- 1954-1955: Stafford Rangers
- * Club domestic league appearances and goals

Frank Brown (born 1890) was an English football player and manager.

Brown began his football career with Barnsley in 1910, moving to Rotherham County in 1914 and then to Huddersfield Town in 1915. In August 1919 he joined Blackpool, but struggled to break into the first team and left to join Exeter City in May 1921. He stayed only one season at St. James' Park, moving to Pontypridd in June 1922 before returning to Devon and joining Torquay United in 1923.

He retired prior to Torquay achieving league status, but became the club's trainer and with Percy Mackrill in charge saw United elected to the Football League. In May 1932 he was appointed manager of Torquay United, and during his six seasons at the helm at Plainmoor, Torquay finished 10th 3 times, and 20th (out of 22 teams) 3 times.

In May 1938, Brown moved to the manager's chair at Chester, leading them to 6th place in Division Three (North) and a second replay against Sheffield Wednesday in the 4th round of the FA Cup in his first season. The war intervened in September 1939 with Chester unbeaten after 3 games of the new season, and Chester joined a regional league alongside the likes of Manchester United, Liverpool, Everton and Manchester City. When league football resumed, Chester finished the 1946–47 season in 3rd place and won the Welsh Cup the same year. However, the following seasons saw mid-table finishes at best as he struggled with the limited resources available. He eventually left Chester in May 1953, and was manager of Stafford Rangers in 1954–55.

He died shortly after finishing his football managerial career.
