= 1952–53 Chester F.C. season =

Chester
1952–53 season
- Manager: Frank Brown
- Stadium: Sealand Road
- Football League Third Division North: 20th
- FA Cup: First round
- Welsh Cup: Final
- Top goalscorer: League: Don Travis (24); All: Don Travis (29)
- Highest home attendance: 11,371 vs Wrexham (15 April)
- Lowest home attendance: 1,941 vs Southport (29 April)
- Average home league attendance: 5,271; 24th in division
Home colours

The 1952–53 season was the 15th season of competitive association football in the Football League played by Chester, an English club based in Chester, Cheshire.

It was the club's 15th consecutive season in the Third Division North since the election to the Football League. Alongside competing in the league, the club also participated in the FA Cup and the Welsh Cup.

== Football League ==
Pos	Team	Pld	W	D	L	GF	GA	GAv	Pts
18	Mansfield Town	46	16	14	16	55	62	0.887	46
19	Barrow	46	16	12	18	66	71	0.930	44
20	Chester	46	11	15	20	64	85	0.753	37
21	Darlington	46	14	6	26	58	96	0.604	34
22	Rochdale	46	14	5	27	62	83	0.747	33

Source: rsssf.com

=== Results summary ===
Overall								Home						Away					
Pld	W	D	L	GF	GA	GAv	Pts	W	D	L	GF	GA	Pts	W	D	L	GF	GA	Pts
46	11	15	20	64	85	0.753	37	10	7	6	39	27	27	1	8	14	25	58	10

Source: rsssf.com

=== Results by matchday ===
Round	1	2	3	4	5	6	7	8	9	10	11	12	13	14	15	16	17	18	19	20	21	22	23	24	25	26	27	28	29	30	31	32	33	34	35	36	37	38	39	40	41	42	43	44	45	46
Result	L	D	W	D	L	D	W	D	L	L	L	L	D	W	L	D	D	W	D	L	W	L	W	L	D	L	L	L	W	D	L	L	W	W	W	D	L	D	D	D	L	L	L	D	L	W
Position	17	20	14	13	18	17	11	11	16	18	20	20	21	20	21	21	19	18	18	19	17	19	17	18	20	20	20	21	20	20	21	21	21	20	20	20	20	20	20	20	20	20	20	20	20	20

Source: statto.com
W = Win; D = Draw; L = Loss

=== Matches ===
Date	Opponents	Venue	Result	Score	Scorers	Attendance
23 August	Stockport County	A	L	1–4	Travis	10,467
27 August	York City	H	D	1–1	Richardson	6,530
30 August	Bradford City	H	W	2–0	Deakin, Bullock	6,365
1 September	York City	A	D	0–0		8,759
6 September	Rochdale	A	L	1–3	Richardson	6,557
11 September	Scunthorpe & Lindsey United	A	D	1–1	Travis	6,695
13 September	Darlington	H	W	6–3	Bullock (2), Matt Costello, Travis, Windle, Richardson	5,519
17 September	Scunthorpe & Lindsey United	H	D	1–1	Matt Costello	5,004
20 September	Gateshead	A	L	1–4	Windle	6,186
24 September	Oldham Athletic	H	L	0–1		5,678
5 January	Hartlepools United	H	L	0–1		4,110
29 September	Crewe Alexandra	A	L	1–4	Bullock	5,698
4 October	Carlisle United	A	D	1–1	Bullock	9,421
11 October	Tranmere Rovers	H	W	3–2	Bullock, Travis, Deakin	9,045
18 October	Chesterfield	A	L	1–2	Richardson	8,675
25 October	Workington	H	D	1–1	Travis	5,009
1 November	Accrington Stanley	A	D	1–1	Bullock	5,903
8 November	Halifax Town	H	W	2–1	Deakin, Travis	5,235
15 November	Mansfield Town	A	D	2–2	Hilton, Coffin	6,390
29 November	Bradford Park Avenue	A	L	0–1		8,145
6 December	Rochdale	H	W	3–0	Bullock, Travis, Kirkpatrick	3,324
13 December	Barrow	A	L	0–3		3,744
20 December	Stockport County	H	W	4–0	Morement, Travis, Bullock, Windle	3,144
26 December	Southport	A	L	0–2		6,000
3 January	Bradford City	A	D	2–2	Travis, Windle	9,172
13 January	Grimsby Town	A	L	4–5	Tony Spink (2), Morement (pen.), Windle	6,204
24 January	Darlington	A	L	2–3	Hilton, Travis	4,243
31 January	Grimsby Town	H	L	0–2		4,005
7 February	Gateshead	H	W	2–0	Travis (2)	5,075
14 February	Hartlepools United	A	D	2–2	Travis, Windle	6,499
21 February	Carlisle United	H	L	1–2	Travis	5,987
28 February	Tranmere Rovers	A	L	0–4		8,633
7 March	Chesterfield	H	W	2–0	Deakin, Astbury	3,794
14 March	Workington	A	W	2–1	Travis (2)	8,466
21 March	Accrington Stanley	H	W	2–0	Deakin, Travis	3,818
25 March	Southport	H	D	0–0		2,744
28 March	Halifax Town	A	L	1–3	Travis	3,296
3 April	Port Vale	A	D	1–1	Sutcliffe	19,413
4 April	Mansfield Town	H	D	2–2	Morement (2)	5,082
6 April	Port Vale	H	D	2–2	Morement, Travis	10,553
11 April	Oldham Athletic	A	L	1–2	Travis	19,058
15 April	Wrexham	H	L	1–2	Sutcliffe	11,371
18 April	Bradford Park Avenue	H	L	0–3		4,441
22 April	Crewe Alexandra	H	D	2–2	Travis (2)	3,468
25 April	Wrexham	A	L	0–7		11,082
29 April	Barrow	H	W	2–1	Travis (2)	1,941

== FA Cup ==
Round	Date	Opponents	Venue	Result	Score	Scorers	Attendance
First round	22 November	Hartlepools United (3N)	H	L	0–1		6,773

== Welsh Cup ==
Round	Date	Opponents	Venue	Result	Score	Scorers	Attendance
Fifth round	31 December	Wrexham (3N)	A	W	4–3	Frank Tomlinson (2), Morement, Windle	5,044
Sixth round	4 February	Pwllheli & District (WLN)	H	W	2–0	Bullock, Sutcliffe	1,600
Quarterfinal	18 February	Lovell's Athletic (SFL)	H	W	5–0	Astbury, Bullock, Travis (3)	1,700
Semifinal	1 April	Connah's Quay Nomads (WLN)	N	W	5–0	Morement (2, 1pen.), Deakin, Hilton, Travis	5,218
Final	27 April	Rhyl (CCL)	N	L	1–2	Travis	8,539

== Season statistics ==
Nat	Player	Total		League		FA Cup		Welsh Cup	
Nat	Player	A	G	A	G	A	G	A	G
Goalkeepers
	Bernard Port	4	–	3	–	–	–	1	–
	Dick Wright	48	–	43	–	1	–	4	–
Field players
(Wales)	Tommy Astbury	35	2	30	1	–	–	5	1
	Norman Bullock	27	11	24	9	–	–	3	2
	Geoff Coffin	25	1	23	1	1	–	1	–
	Matt Costello	9	2	9	2	–	–	–	–
	Billy Deakin	30	6	27	5	1	–	2	1
	Leo Dickens	7	–	7	–	–	–	–	–
(England)	Ray Gill	52	–	46	–	1	–	5	–
	Joe Hilton	33	3	28	2	1	–	4	1
(Wales)	Ron Hughes	30	–	27	–	1	–	2	–
	Roger Kirkpatrick	2	1	2	1	–	–	–	–
(England)	Eric Lee	39	–	34	–	1	–	4	–
	John Molyneux	6	–	5	–	–	–	1	–
	Ralph Morement	41	8	38	5	–	–	3	3
	Sam Morris	4	–	4	–	–	–	–	–
	George Pilkington	20	–	16	–	1	–	3	–
	Fred Richardson	16	4	16	4	–	–	–	–
(England)	Harry Smith	1	–	1	–	–	–	–	–
(England)	Tony Spink	9	2	8	2	1	–	–	–
(England)	Fred Sutcliffe	25	3	21	2	–	–	4	1
	Frank Tomlinson	14	2	11	–	–	–	3	2
	Don Travis	47	29	41	24	1	–	5	5
	Phil Whitlock	4	–	4	–	–	–	–	–
	Billy Windle	44	7	38	6	1	–	5	1
	Own goals	–	–	–	–	–	–	–	–
	Total	52	81	46	64	1	–	5	17
