= List of Margate F.C. seasons =

The Margate team display the Margate and District Charity Cup in 1907.

Margate Football Club is an English association football club based in the seaside resort of Margate, Kent. The club was founded in 1896 and played only friendlies and cup matches until 1909, when the team joined the Thanet and District League. Two years later Margate joined the Kent League, initially also playing in the Thanet League due to the county league's small fixture list, before stepping up to the Southern League in 1933. After four seasons at this level, however, the club was forced to resign on financial grounds and return to the Kent League. Margate returned to the Southern League in 1959 and remained there until 2001 when they gained promotion to the Football Conference, the highest level of English non-League football. During their stay at this level they were forced to groundshare with other clubs due to drawn-out and problematic redevelopment work at their Hartsdown Park ground. This led to the club being expelled from the Conference National in 2004 for failing to meet the division's stadium requirements. After one season in the Conference South the club was relegated to the Isthmian League.

The team, nicknamed "The Gate", have to date reached the third round proper of England's premier cup competition, the FA Cup, on two occasions. The club's best performance in the FA Trophy, the main cup competition specifically for non-League clubs, was a run to the quarter-final stage in 2001–02.

== Seasons ==
List of seasons, including league division and statistics, cup results and top scorer
Season	League									FA Cup	FA Amateur Cup/ FA Trophy^{[A]}	Other competitions	Top scorer		Refs
Season	Division	P	W	D	L	F	A	Pts	Pos	FA Cup	FA Amateur Cup/ FA Trophy^{[A]}	Other competitions	Top scorer		Refs
1896–97	Margate played only friendly matches^{[B]}														
1897–98	Margate did not enter any league competitions									--	--	KJC SF^{[C]}	Pearce	6	
1898–99	Margate did not enter any league competitions									--	--	KJC R4	Taylor-Jones; Wells	2	
1899–1900	Margate did not enter any league competitions									--	--	KJC SF	Pearce; Croseor	4^{[D]}	
1900–01	Margate did not enter any league competitions									--	--	KJC R4	Pearce; Wells; Barrow	2	
1901–02	Margate did not enter any league competitions									--	--	KJC Winners	Barrow	4	
1902–03	Margate did not enter any league competitions									--	--	KJC QF	Phillips	1	
1903–04	Margate did not enter any league competitions									--	--	KJC QF	Matthews	8	
1904–05	Margate did not enter any league competitions									--	--	KJC R2	Sharpe	1	
1905–06	Margate did not enter any league competitions									--	--	KSC R1; MDCC Runners-up	Matthews; Short	2	
1906–07	Margate did not enter any league competitions									--	RP	KAC R3; MDCC Winners	Dowson	8	
1907–08	Margate did not enter any league competitions									--	R3Q	KSC R2Q; KAC R2; MDCC Winners	Pearce	9	
1908–09	Margate did not enter any league competitions									--	R3Q	KSC R3Q; KAC R1; MDCC SF	Bi. Bowden	3	
1909–10	TDL	8	2	1	5	10	22	5	4th	--	R3Q	KSC R1Q; KAC R1Q; MDCC SF	Randall	4	
1910–11	TDL	10	1	1	8	4	33	4	6th	--	R3Q	KSC R1Q; KAC R4Q; MDCC R1	Bi. Bowden	3	
1911–12	KL2E	14	3	2	9	18	41	8	7th	--	R2Q	KSC R1; KAC R2Q; MDCC QF	Fordham	12^{[E]}	
1911–12	TDL^{[F]}	6	2	1	3	5	17	5	3rd	--	R2Q	KSC R1; KAC R2Q; MDCC QF	Fordham	12^{[E]}	
1912–13	KL2E	12	2	2	8	14	26	6	6th	--	R2Q	KAC R3Q; MDCC Winners	Dow	10	
1912–13	TDL	8	5	0	3	23	15	10	2nd	--	R2Q	KAC R3Q; MDCC Winners	Dow	10	
1913–14	KL2E	18	7	5	6	36	34	19	4th	R1Q	R1Q	KSC R1; KAC R1Q; MDCC Winners	Dow	16	
1913–14	TDL	8	5	1	2	15	7	11	1st	R1Q	R1Q	KSC R1; KAC R1Q; MDCC Winners	Dow	16	
1914–15	Margate did not enter any league competitions									R1Q	--	None	No goals scored		
No competitive football was played between 1915 and 1919 due to the First World War.															
1919–20	KL	24	8	6	10	48	51	22	7th	R2Q	--	KSC QF	Sparrow	27^{[G]}	
1920–21	KL	32	14	7	11	41	41	35	8th	R1Q	--	KSC R2; KSS Winners	Copp	26^{[H]}	
1921–22	KL	28	11	8	9	43	36	30	7th	R1Q	--	KSC SF; KSS R1	Reay	13	
1922–23	KL	32	7	6	19	36	72	20	16th	RP	--	KSC R1; KSS R1	Hobby	9	
1923–24	Margate did not play any matches^{[I]}														
1924–25	KL	34	9	5	20	50	92	23	14th	--	--	KSC R1; KSS R1	Arnold	22	
1925–26	KL	36	15	8	13	81	60	38	7th	--	--	KSC R1; KLC R1^{[J]}	Stennings	34	
1926–27	KL	26	18	4	4	70	33	40	3rd	RP	--	KSC R3Q; KLC SF; KSS R1	Stennings	35^{[K]}	
1927–28	KL	26	14	6	6	68	43	34	2nd	RP	--	KSC R2; KLC R2	Brookes	25	
1928–29	Margate did not play any matches^{[L]}														
1929–30	KL	32	23	3	6	103	33	49	2nd	R2	--	KSC Runners-up; KSS SF; KLC QF	Wade	46	
1930–31	KL	36	24	10	2	99	27	58	3rd	R4Q	--	KSC R2; KSS Winners	Wade	24	
1931–32	KL	36	25	4	7	129	38	54	4th	R4Q	--	KSC R2; KSS R1	Stennings	38	
1932–33	KL	34	28	1	5	112	34	57	1st	R2	--	KSC SF; KLC SF	Billy Mays	60	
1933–34	SLE^{[M]}	16	8	3	5	23	20	19	2nd	R1	--	KSC runners-up KSS SF; SLC R1	Frank Keetley	30	
1933–34	KL	36	23	3	10	94	68	49	3rd	R1	--	KSC runners-up KSS SF; SLC R1	Frank Keetley	30	
1934–35	SLE	18	7	6	5	38	30	20	3rd	R4Q^{[N]}	--	KSC R1; KSS R1; SLC R2	Reg Tricker	38	
1934–35	SLC	20	8	3	9	40	34	19	6th	R4Q^{[N]}	--	KSC R1; KSS R1; SLC R2	Reg Tricker	38	
1934–35	KL	36	23	4	9	110	51	50	3rd	R4Q^{[N]}	--	KSC R1; KSS R1; SLC R2	Reg Tricker	38	
1935–36	SLE	18	13	2	3	49	16	28	1st	R3	--	KSC Winners; KSS Winners; SLC R1	Jock Davie	35	
1935–36	SLC	20	14	3	3	57	18	31	1st^{[O]}	R3	--	KSC Winners; KSS Winners; SLC R1	Jock Davie	35	
1936–37	SL	30	15	4	11	64	49	34	4th	R4Q	--	KSC Winners; KSS Winners; SLC R1	Eddie Carr	30	
1936–37	SLMW	18	12	1	5	48	24	25	1st	R4Q	--	KSC Winners; KSS Winners; SLC R1	Eddie Carr	30	
1937–38	KL^{[P]}	32	24	4	4	103	31	52	1st	--	--	KSC SF; KSS Runners-up	Wilf Walsh	31	
1938–39	Margate did not play any matches^{[Q]}														
1939–40	KL^{[R]}	1	1	0	0	4	1	2	n/a	REP^{[S]}	--	KSC R2Q; KSS SF^{[T]}	Watkins	2	
No competitive football was played between 1940 and 1945 due to the Second World War.															
1945–46	Competitive football resumed but Margate did not reform until a year later														
1946–47	KL1	30	16	9	5	89	46	41	1st	RP	--	KSC R2; KSS SF	Ted Bensley	25	
1947–48	KL1	34	24	1	9	103	44	49	1st	R1Q	--	KSC R1; KSS Winners; KLC Winners	Frank Johnson	29	
1948–49	KL1	34	14	5	15	84	64	33	10th	RP	--	KSC R2; KSS R1	Alfred Hope	30	
1949–50	KL1	32	17	5	10	67	39	39	6th	REP	--	KSC R1; KSS SF; KLC R2	Frank Johnson; Ronnie Martell	18	
1950–51	KL1	32	16	9	7	93	57	41	6th	REP	--	KSC R1; KSS Runners-up; KLC R2	Almer Hall	24	
1951–52	KL1	32	16	7	9	77	49	39	4th	R1Q	--	KSC R2; KLC R1	Jock Flannigan	21	
1952–53	KL1	32	19	5	8	75	46	43	4th	RP	--	KSC R2; KSS Winners (joint)^{[U]} KLC Runners-up	Jock Flannigan	25	
1953–54	KL1	30	19	6	5	74	36	44	2nd	R2Q	--	KSC R1; KSS R1; KLC Winners	Peter Vandepeer	34	
1954–55	KL1	32	17	6	9	82	48	40	5th	R2Q	--	KSC R2; KSS Runners-up; KLC Runners-up	Peter Vandepeer	46	
1955–56	KL1	32	19	6	7	93	45	44	2nd	R1	--	KSC R1; KSS R1; KLC Runners-up	Peter Vandepeer	30	
1956–57	KL1	32	16	2	14	64	65	34	8th	R2	--	KSC R1; KSS SF; KLC SF	Johnny Roche	20	
1957–58	KL1	34	20	9	5	80	34	49	2nd	R1	--	KSC SF; KSS SF; KLC Runners-up	Dennis Yeomans	32	
1958–59	KL1	34	18	5	11	101	72	41	5th	R1	--	KSC R3; KLC Runners-up; TMC Grp	Freddie Kearns; Tony Spink	27	
1959–60	SL1	42	20	6	16	88	77	46	7th	R2	--	KSC Runners-up; SLC R1; KSS SF	Freddie Kearns	40	
1960–61	SL1	40	11	12	17	62	75	34	15th	R4Q	--	KSC R2; SLC R2; KSS R1	Alan Brown	28	
1961–62	SL1	38	20	6	12	74	55	46	5th	R2	--	KSC SF; SLC Runners-up; KSS Winners; KFC Grp	Alan Blackburn	30	
1962–63	SL1	38	21	13	4	86	47	55	1st	R1	--	KSC Runners-up; SLC SF; KSS Winners; KFC Winners	Alan Blackburn	37	
1963–64	SLP	42	12	13	17	68	81	37	17th	R1	--	KSC R2; SLC R2; KSS R1; KFC Grp	Alan Blackburn	28	
1964–65	SLP	42	20	9	13	88	79	49	6th	R4Q	--	KSC R3; SLC R2; KFL Grp	John Ballagher	50	
1965–66	SLP	42	8	10	24	66	111	26	22nd	R1Q	--	KSC SF; SLC R2; KSS SF; KFC Runners-up	Dennis Randall	21	
1966–67	SL1	46	31	7	8	127	54	69	2nd	R3Q	--	KSC Runners-up; SLC QF; KSS R2; KFC Grp	Dennis Randall	54	
1967–68	SLP	42	19	8	15	80	71	46	8th	R2	--	KSC^{[V]} SLC Winners; KFL Grp	John Fahy	53	
1968–69	SLP	42	14	7	21	79	90	35	18th	R1	--	KSC Runners-up; SLC R3; KFC Winners; SLCH Winners	Phil Amato	32	
1969–70	SLP	42	17	8	17	70	64	42	13th	R1	R3Q	KSC Runners-up; SLC R3; KFC Runners-up; KSS Grp	Johnny Ray	30	
1970–71	SLP	42	15	10	17	64	70	40	13th	R1	R1	KSC QF; SLC SF; KFC Grp	John Baber; Gerry Baker; Hughie Cochrane	11	
1971–72	SLP	42	19	8	15	80	71	46	9th	R1	R1	KSC R2; SLC SF; KFC Grp	Barry Brown	20	
1972–73	SLP	42	17	15	10	80	60	49	7th	R3	R3Q	KSC R2; SLC R1; KFC Grp	Barry Brown	23	
1973–74	SLP	42	15	8	19	56	63	38	17th	R4Q	R2	KSC Winners; SLC SF; KMT Grp	Barry Brown; John Hold	19	
1974–75	SLP	42	17	12	13	64	64	46	7th	R4Q	R2	KSC R2; SLC Runners-up; KMT Grp	Carl Gilbert	23	
1975–76	SLP	42	15	12	15	62	60	42	11th	R3Q	R2	KSC SF; SLC R1; KFT Runners-up	Brian Gregory	43	
1976–77	SLP	42	9	10	23	47	85	28	22nd	R3Q	R1	KSC R1; SLC R2	Ray Summers	15	
1977–78	SL1S	38	24	10	4	92	32	58	1st	R1Q	R3Q	KSC R1; SLC R1; KSS^{[W]}	Ray Summers; Vic Pain	20	
1978–79	SLP	42	10	9	23	44	75	29	19th^{[X]}	R4Q	R3	KSC R2; SLC R1	Ricky Fusco; George Putman	10	
1979–80	SLS	46	17	8	21	51	62	42	17th	R4Q	R3Q	KSC R2; SLC R2	Lennie Lee	14	
1980–81	SLS	46	11	7	28	65	117	29	22nd	R2Q	R3Q	KSC R2; SLC R1	Lennie Lee; Vic Pain	14	
1981–82	SLS	46	5	7	34	37	110	17	24th	R1Q	R1Q	KSC R1; SLC R1	Dave Clay	11	
1982–83	SLS^{[Y]}	34	10	5	19	30	61	35	14th	R3Q	R1Q	KSC R2; SLC R1	Lennie Lee	10	
1983–84	SLS	38	9	8	21	40	65	35	18th	R2Q	R1Q	KSC R2; SLC R3	Steve Dudley	12	
1984–85	SLS	38	19	9	10	63	47	66	5th	R1Q	R1Q	KSC SF; SLC Grp; EFC Runners-up	Vic Medus	24	
1985–86	SLS	40	13	7	20	58	63	46	15th	R1Q	RP	KSC R1; SLC Grp; EFC Grp	Gary Doe	14	
1986–87	SLS	38	14	14	10	56	50	56	10th	RP	R1Q	KSC R1; SLC Grp; EFC Grp; ITGC Winners	Gary Doe	13	
1987–88	SLS	40	17	13	10	60	38	64	5th	R4Q	R2Q	KSC R1; SLC Grp	Neil Cugley	27	
1988–89	SLS	42	7	15	20	47	95	36	20th	R2Q	R2Q	KSC R1; SLC R2; ITGC Winners (joint)^{[Z]}	Garry Aldous; Mark Munday	10	
1989–90	SLS	42	12	15	15	46	45	51	16th	R2Q	R2Q	ITGC Winners; KSC R1; SLC R3	Ronnie Murrock; Andy Sawyer	8	
1990–91	SLS	40	14	11	15	52	55	53	10th	R3Q	R3Q	KSC R1; SLC R2; ITGC Losers	Paul Underwood	26	
1991–92	SLS	42	13	16	13	49	56	55	14th	R1Q	R3Q	KSC R1; SLC R1; ITGC Losers	Martin Buglione	18	
1992–93	SLS	42	18	7	16	65	58	64	10th	R2Q	R2Q	KSC R1; SLC R1	Martin Buglione	38	
1993–94	SLS	42	20	8	14	76	58	68	9th	R3Q	R1Q	KSC Winners; SLC R3	Joe Brayne	25	
1994–95	SLS	42	15	7	20	60	72	52	13th	R3Q	R1Q	KSC R2; SLC R3	Steve Cuggy	40	
1995–96	SLS	42	18	5	19	68	62	59	11th	R2Q	R1Q	KSC R1; SLC R2	Martin Buglione	38	
1996–97	SLS	42	21	9	12	70	47	72	5th	RP	R1Q	KSC R1; SLC R2	Martin Buglione	27	
1997–98	SLS	42	23	8	11	71	42	77	6th	R1	R2	KSC Winners; SLC Winners	Paul Sykes	33	
1998–99	SLS	42	27	8	7	84	33	89	2nd	RP	R2	SLCH Losers; KSC SF; SLC R1	Paul Sykes	23	
1999–2000	SLP	42	23	8	11	64	43	77	3rd	R4Q	R2	KSC R2; SLC R4	Phil Collins	28	
2000–01	SLP	42	28	7	7	75	27	91	1st	R2Q	R4	KSC R2; SLC R2	Phil Collins	34	
2001–02	Conf	42	14	16	12	59	53	58	8th	R4Q	QF	SLCH Winners; KSC Runners-up	Leon Braithwaite	15	
2002–03	Conf	42	15	11	16	60	66	56	10th	R2	R5	KSC Winners	Leon Braithwaite	13	
2003–04	Conf	42	14	9	19	56	64	51	16th^{[AA]}	R4Q	R5	KSC Winners	Adrian Clarke	9	
2004–05	ConfS	46	12	8	22	54	75	34^{[AB]}	21st	R3Q	R1	KSC Winners; CLC R4	Che Stadhart	21	
2005–06	IsP	42	11	17	14	49	55	50	14th	R3Q	R2Q	KSC SF; ILC R3	Danny Hockton	16	
2006–07	IsP	42	20	11	11	79	48	71	6th	R3Q	R2Q	KSC R1; ILC R2	Danny Hockton	40	
2007–08	IsP	42	17	11	14	71	68	62	9th	R3Q	R2Q	KSC SF; ILC R2	James Pinnock	27	
2008–09	IsP	42	13	7	22	51	64	46	19th	R1Q	R1Q	KSC R1; ILC R2	Kenny Pratt	10	
2009–10	IsP	42	11	12	19	49	71	45	19th	R1Q	R1Q	KSC R3; ILC R3	Lloyd Blackman	14	
2010–11	IsP	42	11	12	19	52	64	45	16th	R2Q	R2Q	KSC R2; ILC R2	Shaun Welford	12	
2011–12	IsP	42	15	8	19	65	65	53	15th	R3Q	R2Q	KSC R3; ILC R3	Kwesi Appiah	35	
2012–13	IsP	42	17	11	14	61	49	62	9th	R3Q	R1Q	KSC QF; ILC R2	Tommy Whitnell	11	
2013–14	IsP	46	18	10	18	70	67	64	11th	R2Q	R3Q	KSC 1R; ILC R3	Phil Walsh	13	
2014–15	IsP	46	25	10	11	94	58	85	3rd^{[AC]}	R2Q	R1Q	KSC SF; ILC SF	Ryan Moss	26	
2015–16	NLS	42	13	8	21	51	73	47	19th	R4Q	R3Q	KSC R1	Freddie Ladapo	14	
2016–17	NLS	42	7	4	31	26	81	25	22nd	R4Q	R3Q	KSC R2	Elliott Buchanan	8	
2017–18	IsP	46	20	17	9	77	53	77	7th	R4Q	R3Q	KSC QF; ILC R2	Jordan Chiedozie	34	
2018–19	IsP	42	16	11	15	45	48	59	12th	R2Q	R1Q	KSC R1; ILC R1	Kadell Daniel; Noel Leighton; Elliott Reeves	13	
2019–20	IsP	33	11	10	12	47	54	43	n/a^{[AD]}	R2Q	R2Q	KSC R1; ILC QF	Frannie Collin; Joe Taylor	8	
2020–21	IsP	9	1	3	5	6	13	6	n/a^{[AD]}	R1Q	R1	--	Noel Leighton; Norman Wabo; John Ufuah	2	
2021–22	IsP	42	19	8	15	60	62	65	8th	R2Q	R1	KSC QF; ILC Runners-up	Ben Greenhalgh	23	
2022–23	IsP	42	11	11	20	48	65	44	17th	R2Q	R3Q	KSC Winners; ILC QF	Ben Greenhalgh	17	
2023–24	IsP	42	10	9	23	50	80	39	19th	R3Q	R3Q	KSC R1; ILC R3			
2024–25	IsSE	42	25	12	5	89	50	87	4th	R3Q	R2Q	KSC R2; ILC R3			

== Key ==
Winners	Runners up	Promoted	Relegated

Division shown in bold when it changes due to promotion, relegation or league reorganisation. Top scorer shown in bold when he set or equalled a club record.

**Key to league record**
P – games played
W – games won
D – games drawn
L – games lost
F – goals for
A – goals against
Pts – points
Pos – final position

**Key to rounds**
– indicates that Margate did not enter the competition in the given season
Grp – group stage
QR1 – first qualifying round
QR2 – second qualifying round, etc.
REP – extra-preliminary round
RP – preliminary round
R1 – first round
R2 – second round, etc.
QF – quarter-final
SF – semi-final
n/a – not applicable

**Key to divisions**
Conf – Conference
ConfS/NLS – Conference South/National League South (renamed in 2015)
IsP – Isthmian League Premier Division
KL – Kent League
KL1 – Kent League Division One
KL2E – Kent League Division Two East
SL – Southern League
SLP – Southern League Premier Division
SLS – Southern League Southern Division
SL1 – Southern League Division One
SL1S – Southern League Division One South
SLE – Southern League Eastern Section
SLC – Southern League Central Section
SLMW – Southern League Midweek Section
TDL – Thanet and District League

**Key to cups**
CLC – Conference League Cup
EFC – Eastern Floodlit Cup
ILC – Isthmian League Cup
ITGC – Isle of Thanet Gazette Cup
KAC – Kent Amateur Cup
KFC – Kent Floodlit Cup
KFL – Kent Floodlit League
KFT – Kent Floodlit Trophy
KJC – Kent Junior Cup
KLC – Kent League Cup
KMT – Kent Messenger Trophy
KSC – Kent Senior Cup
KSS – Kent Senior Shield
MDCC – Margate and District Charity Cup
SLC – Southern League Cup
SLCH – Southern League Championship Match
TMC – Thames and Medway Cup

== Notes ==
A. Margate entered the FA Amateur Cup until the First World War. The club entered the FA Trophy from its creation in 1969.
B. Margate's first ever match was a friendly against Wye F.C. on 28 October 1896.
C. Margate's first round match against Folkestone Post Office was the club's first ever competitive match. It was ordered to be replayed as Margate had fielded an ineligible player.
D. Pearce also scored twice in a match against Broadstairs Town which was abandoned due to fog and ordered to be replayed.
E. Fordham also scored one goal in a match against Ramsgate Town which was declared void and ordered to be replayed for unknown reasons.
F. Matches in both leagues are considered to have been first team matches.
G. Sparrow also scored three goals in a match against Royal Army Service Corps which was later declared void when that team resigned from the league.
H. Copp also scored one goal in a match against 1st Middlesex Regiment which was later declared void when that team resigned from the league.
I. At the end of the 1922–23 season Margate were suspended from the league for financial irregularities and subsequently folded. The club reformed a year later and re-entered the league.
J. Margate were knocked out of the Kent League Cup after losing 3–0 to Ashford Railway Works in a league match which it was agreed would also count as a League Cup match.
K. Stennings also scored one goal in a match against Catford Southend which was later declared void when that team resigned from the league.
L. Margate folded for a second time at the end of the 1927–28 due to heavy debts. The club reformed a year later and returned to the league.
M. Following their Kent League title win, Margate successfully applied for membership of the Southern League and were placed in the Eastern Section. They continued to field a team in the Kent League, and that league placed a requirement on the club to field its strongest team, therefore both leagues are considered to have been first team competitions.
N. Margate's FA Cup fourth round qualifying match against Folkestone was abandoned due to fog, but as it was subsequently discovered that Margate had fielded an ineligible player, the tie was awarded to Folkestone rather than a replay ordered.
O. Margate won the overall Southern League championship by defeating Western Section winners Plymouth Argyle Reserves 3–1 in a play-off match, which was held over until September 1936.
P. Margate resigned from the Southern League in 1937 for financial reasons and returned to the Kent League.
Q. Margate folded for a third time after the 1937–38 season due to debt. Once again, the club reformed a year later.
R. The Kent League was abandoned after Margate's first match due to the outbreak of the Second World War and replaced with the Kent Regional League, which is not generally included in official statistics. This league was itself abandoned before the end of the season, although Margate had already played all their matches, with a record of P20 W7 D5 L8 F47 A44 Pts19.
S. Margate drew 2–2 with Erith & Belvedere but the competition was abandoned before the replay took place.
T. The Kent Senior Cup and Senior Shield competitions continued throughout the season. Margate reached the semi-final of the Shield but failed to turn up for the match and were expelled from the competition.
U. Margate and Folkestone were declared joint winners of the Kent Senior Shield after a 1–1 draw in the final.
V. Margate played one match in the Kent Senior Cup, but it is unclear which round this represented.
W. Margate played three matches in the Kent Senior Shield, but it is unclear which rounds these represented.
X. Margate were technically not relegated as the Southern League Premier Division was scrapped in 1979 due to the formation of the Alliance Premier League. The league was instead reorganised into two parallel divisions, the Southern Division and the Midland Division, with Margate playing in the Southern Division.
Y. Having finished bottom of the table, Margate did not qualify for a place in the Southern League Premier Division, which was reformed for the 1982–83 season. They remained in the Southern Division, which became the second tier of the league.
Z. Margate and Ramsgate were declared joint winners of the Isle of Thanet Gazette Cup after the match finished 1–1.
AA. Although Margate finished in 16th position, the club was relegated to the newly formed Conference South due to not being able to meet the stadium requirements of what was now designated the Conference National.
AB. Margate were deducted 10 points for entering administrative receivership.
AC. By finishing 3rd, Margate qualified for the promotion play-offs and beat Dulwich Hamlet in the semi-final and Hendon in the final to gain promotion.
AD. Season not completed due to COVID-19 pandemic
