= 1952–53 Welsh Cup =

Tournament details
- Country: Wales

Final positions
- Champions: (Wales) Rhyl
- Runners-up: (England) Chester

The 1952–53 FAW Welsh Cup is the 66th season of the annual knockout tournament for competitive football teams in Wales.

== Key ==
League name pointed after clubs name.

- CCL - Cheshire County League
- FL D1 - Football League First Division
- FL D3N - Football League Third Division North
- SFL - Southern Football League
- WLN - Welsh League North

== Fifth round ==
Eight winners from the Fourth round and ten new clubs.

Tie no	Home	Score	Away
1	Wrexham (FL D3N)	3–4	Chester (FL D3N)

== Sixth round ==
Three winners from the Fifth round plus Pwllheli & District. Six clubs get a bye to the Seventh round.

Tie no	Home	Score	Away
1	Chester (FL D3N)	2–0	Pwllheli & District (WLN)

== Seventh round ==
Tie no	Home	Score	Away
1	Chester (FL D3N)	5–0	Lovell's Athletic (SFL)

== Semifinal ==
Chester and Connah's Quay Nomads played at Wrexham.

Tie no	Home	Score	Away
1	Rhyl (CCL)	1–0	Cardiff City (FL D1)
2	Chester (FL D3N)	5–0	Connah's Quay Nomads (WLN)

== Final ==
Final were held at Bangor.

Tie no	Home	Score	Away
1	Rhyl (CCL)	2–1	Chester (FL D3N)
