= George Pilkington (disambiguation) =

George Pilkington can refer to:

- George Pilkington (born 1981), English footballer
- George Pilkington (footballer, born 1926) (1926–2016), English footballer
- George Pilkington (painter) (1879–1958), South African painter
- George Augustus Pilkington (1848–1916), English politician
