= Matthew Costello (disambiguation) =

Matthew Costello is an American writer.

Matthew or Matt Costello may also refer to:

- Matthew Costello (basketball)
- Matthew Costello (footballer)
