= Dick Wright =

Dick Wright may refer to:

- Dick Wright (baseball) (1890–1952), baseball player
- Dick Wright (footballer, born 1931) (1931–2003), footballer for Chester City
- Dick Wright (Australian footballer) (1902–1961), Australian rules footballer

== See also ==
- Richard Wright (disambiguation)
