= Richard Wright =

Richard or Rick Wright may refer to:

== Arts ==
- Richard Wright (author) (1908–1960), African-American novelist
- Richard B. Wright (1937–2017), Canadian novelist
- Richard Wright (painter) (1735–1775), English marine painter
- Richard Wright (artist) (born 1960), British artist
- Richard Wright (musician) (1943–2008), keyboardist and founding member of Pink Floyd

== Politics ==
- Richard Wright (MP) (1568–1639), MP for Dorchester from 1597 to 1598
- Richard L. Wright (born 1943), American political leader
- Richard R. Wright (1855–1947), American military officer, educator, politician, civil rights advocate, and banking entrepreneur

== Sports ==
- Richard Wright (cricketer, born 1877) (1877–1942), English cricketer
- Richard Wright (cricketer, born 1903) (1903–1991), English cricketer
- Richard Wright (footballer) (born 1977), retired English football goalkeeper
- Rick Wright (football manager), Bermudian football manager
- Rich Wright

== Other ==
- Richard Wright (Unitarian) (1764–1836), Unitarian minister
- Richard Cotsman Wright (1841–1921), Canadian architect
- Richard R. Wright Jr. (1878–1967), American sociologist
- Richard T. Wright (born 1951), American criminologist
- Orville Wilbur Richard "Rick" Wright, a character in the TV series Magnum, P.I., named Orville "Rick" Wright in the 2018 series reboot

== See also ==
- Dick Wright (disambiguation)
- Ricky Wright (disambiguation)
