= Ricky Wright =

Ricky Wright may refer to:

- Ricky Wright (baseball) (born 1958), baseball pitcher
- Ricky Wright (rugby league) (born 1978), rugby league player
- Ricky Wright (ring announcer) (born 1986), boxing and mixed martial arts ring announcer

== See also ==
- Richard Wright (disambiguation)
