= Freddie Kearns =

Irish footballer

Personal information
- Full name: Frederick Thomas Kearns
- Date of birth: 8 November 1927
- Place of birth: Cork, Ireland
- Date of death: 7 January 1987 (aged 59)
- Place of death: Margate, Kent, England
- Height: 5 ft 11 in (1.80 m)
- Position: Centre-forward

Senior career*
Years	Team	Apps	(Gls)
- Shamrock Rovers
1948–1954	West Ham United	43	(14)
1954–1956	Norwich City	28	(11)
1956–1957	Tonbridge		
1957–1961	Margate		
1962–1963	Deal Town		

International career
1954	Republic of Ireland	1	(0)

Managerial career
- 1980: Ramsgate (assistant)
- * Club domestic league appearances and goals

Frederick Thomas Kearns (8 November 1927 – 7 January 1987) was an Irish professional footballer who played as a centre-forward in the Football League for West Ham United and Norwich City.

Born in Cork, Kearns started his football career at the age of 16, having played hurling before that. He played for Shamrock Rovers before moving to England and West Ham United in May 1948. He had initially been signed as a full-back, but was moved to centre-forward while with the Hammers. In his five years at the club, he scored 14 goals in 43 games.

Kearns joined Norwich City for £9,000 in June 1954 and scored 11 times in 28 league appearances, before moving into non-league football with Tonbridge in 1956. At the Angels, he would usually play at inside-left, with Ron Saunders occupying the number 9 position. He would combine his football career with his work as a window cleaner.

He moved to Kent League club Margate in 1957. He scored a hat-trick on his debut and totalled 30 goals in his first season at the club. In 1958–59, he managed 27 goals and ended the season as joint-top scorer (with Tony Spink). This included back-to-back hat-tricks, against Chatham and Ramsgate, in October. This was despite playing out of position in many of the games that season.

1959–60 saw Kearns amass 39 goals in 51 appearances, including all four of Margate's goals in the games against Kettering in the first round of the FA Cup (Margate won the replay 3–1 after the first game had ended 1–1). The season also saw Kearns put five past Trowbridge Town, score four against Bexleyheath & Welling, and manage three hat-tricks.

With new signing Alan Brown first choice at centre-forward, Kearns found first-team chances limited in 1960–61 and he played mainly for the reserve team. He scored one goal in his 15 appearances, against Kettering on 27 August 1960, and was released at the end of the season.

After turning down a contract at Canterbury City, Kearns spent the latter part of the 1961–62 season at Deal Town. He retired from football at the end of the following season.

He played once for the Republic of Ireland national team, winning his only cap in a World Cup qualification match against Luxembourg on 7 March 1954.

In the 1960s, Kearns coached at Margate County Youth Club, and then at Sunday league team Quarterdeck in the 1970s. He was assistant manager to former Margate player Graham Sawyer at Ramsgate between July and October 1980.

He died in January 1987.
