= Martin Buglione =

English footballer

Personal information
- Date of birth: 19 June 1968 (age 58)
- Place of birth: Essex, England
- Position: Striker

Senior career*
Years	Team	Apps	(Gls)
1984–1986	Enfield		
- → Walthamstow Avenue (loan)
1986–?	Boreham Wood		
- Dagenham
- Welling United
- → Tonbridge Angels (loan)
?–1990	Alma Swanley		
1990–1993	Margate		
1993–1994	St Johnstone	17	(2)
1994–1995	Sittingbourne		
1995–1998	Margate		
1998–?	Hayes		
- → Gravesend & Northfleet (loan)
- Hampton & Richmond Borough
2000	Boreham Wood		
2000	Deal Town		
2000	Welling United		
2000	Ashford Town (Kent)	5	(3)
2000–2002	Purfleet		
2002–2003	Dartford		
2004–2005	Maidstone United		
2005	Erith & Belvedere		
2005	Great Wakering Rovers		
- * Club domestic league appearances and goals

Martin Buglione (born 19 June 1968) is an English former footballer. He played in the Scottish Premier Division for St Johnstone, and also played for a large number of English non-league clubs. He was most successful at Margate, where in two spells he scored 158 goals, an all-time club record, and he also played for a host of other clubs including Tonbridge Angels, Welling United, Sittingbourne, Ashford Town (Kent), Dartford, Enfield, Boreham Wood, Walthamstow Avenue, Hayes, Purfleet and Hampton & Richmond Borough.

In 2007, he was working as reserve team manager for Broxbourne Borough V & E.

== Personal life ==
In 2020, Buglione appeared on the TV dating show First Dates Hotel. He stated that he was divorced with adult children and a grandchild, lived in Leigh-on-Sea, and worked as a roofer.
