= Billy Deakin =

English footballer (1925–2018)

Personal information
- Full name: William Edward Deakin
- Date of birth: 19 January 1925
- Place of birth: Maltby, England
- Date of death: August 2018 (aged 93)
- Position: Winger

Youth career
- Sunnyside W.M.C.

Senior career*
Years	Team	Apps	(Gls)
1949–1952	Barnsley	25	(3)
1952–1953	Chester	27	(5)
- Corby Town
Total		52	(8)
- * Club domestic league appearances and goals

Billy Deakin (19 January 1925 – August 2018) was a footballer who played as a winger in the Football League for Barnsley and Chester.
