= Fred Richardson =

English footballer

Personal information
- Date of birth: 18 August 1925
- Place of birth: Spennymoor, England
- Date of death: 28 July 2016 (aged 90)
- Position: Centre forward

Youth career
- Bishop Auckland

Senior career*
Years	Team	Apps	(Gls)
1946–1947	Chelsea	2	(0)
1947–1948	Hartlepools United	43	(16)
1948–1950	Barnsley	41	(12)
1950–1951	West Bromwich Albion	29	(8)
1951–1953	Chester	23	(6)
1953–1956	Hartlepools United	106	(19)
- South Shields
Total		244	(61)
- * Club domestic league appearances and goals

Fred Richardson (18 August 1925 – 28 July 2016) was an English footballer, who played as a centre forward in the Football League for Chelsea, Hartlepools United, Barnsley, West Bromwich Albion and Chester.

His grandson Kenton Richardson is a professional footballer who also played for Hartlepool.
