= Danny Hockton =

English footballer (born 1979)

Personal information
- Date of birth: 7 February 1979 (age 47)
- Place of birth: Barking, London, England
- Position: Striker

Team information
- Current team: Faversham Town

Youth career
- Millwall

Senior career*
Years	Team	Apps	(Gls)
1996–2000	Millwall	36	(4)
1999–2000	→ Leyton Orient (loan)	5	(0)
2000	Stevenage Borough	21	(6)
2000–2001	Dover Athletic	17	(11)
2001–2002	Chelmsford City	33	(14)
2002–2003	Crawley Town	31	(9)
2003–2005	Billericay Town	67	(35)
2005–2007	Margate	60	(52)
2007–2008	Bromley	10	(4)
2008–2009	Braintree Town	?	(?)
2009	Chelmsford City	2	(1)
2009–2011	Maidstone United	51	(16)
2010–2011	→ Bromley (loan)	2	(0)
2011	→ Thurrock (loan)	10	(0)
2011	Bromley	?	(?)
2011	Thurrock	?	(?)
2011	Aveley	1	(0)
2011–2014	Faversham Town	66	(15)
- * Club domestic league appearances and goals as of 07:58, 17 November 2011 (UTC)

Danny Hockton (born 7 February 1979), is an English footballer who plays as a striker. Hockton last played for Isthmian League Division One South club Faversham Town.

== Career ==
Born in Barking, London, Hockton began his career with Millwall. He played for Millwall from 1996–97 to 1999–2000, scoring seven goals in 44 appearances, 31 of which were as a substitute.

He joined Conference National side Stevenage Borough in January 2000, scoring six goals in 22 appearances, before transferring to fellow Conference club Dover Athletic in December 2000 for £7,500. He scored 10 goals in 17 appearances during the remainder of the 2000–01 season.

When Gary Bellamy took over as Dover manager in the summer of 2001, Hockton was one of the first players to be moved out of the club. Hockton moved down a level to then Southern League club Chelmsford City in August 2001. He had one season there and scored 16 goals, before signing for fellow Southern League side Crawley Town for the start of the 2002–03 season. Hockton scored 15 goals in 31 games, but was released at the end of the season.

Hockton moved to Isthmian League club Billericay Town in the summer of 2003. He went on to score 52 goals in 75 appearances for the club, despite suffering a knee injury that sidelined him for a large part of the 2004–05 season. In January 2006, Hockton switched to fellow Isthmian League side Margate for an undisclosed fee. He won the club's Golden Boot award for the 2005–06 season, scoring 16 goals in 18 league appearances.

Hockton was in lethal scoring form in the 2006–07 season. He won the Isthmian League Golden Boot award, the Margate Golden Boot award and the Margate Supporters' Player of the Year award, after scoring 36 league goals in 40 appearances, but left to join Bromley for an undisclosed fee in June 2007. He then moved on to Braintree Town in September 2008 for an undisclosed fee, before leaving in April 2009 to join former club Chelmsford City.

Hockton was released by Chelmsford City in November 2009 and subsequently signed for Isthmian Premier side Maidstone United on a one-and-a-half-year deal. Hockton started slowly, scoring only five goals in 27 matches and in the summer of 2010 he was transfer listed by Maidstone, with the club stating they could no longer afford him. No move materialised however and Hockton started the 2010–11 season at Maidstone, starting regularly and averaging a goal every other game. Despite this Hockton joined Bromley on a one-month loan in December 2010, making two appearances in a month plagued with match postponements. Hockton returned to Maidstone but soon went out on loan again in March 2011 after losing his place in the Stones first team, this time joining Conference South club Thurrock until the end of the season. He played ten games for the Essex club, but disappointingly did not get on the score sheet. In the summer of 2011 Hockton's contract at parent club Maidstone expired, and he left the side for whom he scored 19 goals in sixty appearances.

Hockton subsequently returned to former club Bromley, before moving on to Thurrock in September 2011. Hockton spent just over a month at Thurrock before dropping down a level to join neighbours Aveley, but lasted a little over two weeks at the club before signing for Isthmian League Division One South side Faversham Town. Hockton taking up a player-coach at Faversham Town F.C at the end of the 2011/2012 season.

He later became assistant manager at Gravesham Borough.
