= Leo Dickens =

English footballer (1927–2019)

Personal information
- Full name: Leo Dickens
- Date of birth: March 16, 1927
- Place of birth: Hemsworth, West Yorkshire, England
- Date of death: February 21, 2019 (aged 91)
- Place of death: South Kirkby, Wakefield, West Yorkshire, England
- Position: Full back

Senior career*
| Years | Team | Apps | (Gls) |
- Rotherham United
| 1952–1953 | Chester | 7 | (0) |
- Upton Colliery
- * Club domestic league appearances and goals

Leo Dickens (16 March 1927 – 21 February 2019) was an English footballer who played as a full back in the Football League for Chester. He later worked as a railway worker. Dickens died in South Kirkby, Wakefield in February 2019 at the age of 81 after suffering from Alzheimer's disease.

== Career ==
Dickens played for two seasons with Rotherham United as both a left-half and a centre-half, before being signed by Chester. At Chester Dickens made just a handful of Football League appearances. Dickens went on to play for Upton Colliery where he played alongside his brother, Jim, in defence.
