= Don Travis =

English footballer

Personal information
- Date of birth: 21 January 1924
- Place of birth: Moston, Manchester, England
- Date of death: 2002 (aged 77–78)
- Place of death: Yeovil, England
- Position: Centre forward

Youth career
- Blackpool

Senior career*
Years	Team	Apps	(Gls)
1946–1948	West Ham United	5	(0)
1948	Southend United	1	(0)
1948–1950	Accrington Stanley	71	(36)
1950–1952	Crewe Alexandra	36	(12)
1952	Oldham Athletic	5	(1)
1952–1954	Chester	99	(45)
1954–1957	Oldham Athletic	109	(61)
- Yeovil Town
Total		326	(155)
- * Club domestic league appearances and goals

Don Travis (21 January 1924 – 2002) was a footballer who played as a centre forward in the Football League for West Ham United, Southend United, Accrington Stanley, Crewe Alexandra, Oldham Athletic and Chester.

== Career ==
Travis started his career with West Ham United. On 16 February 1946, playing in the Wartime League, Travis scored four goals against Plymouth Argyle. He had already scored four goals on his debut for the reserves and is the only West Ham player to score four on his debut for both teams.
