= Leon Braithwaite =

English footballer

Personal information
- Full name: Leon Jerome Braithwaite
- Date of birth: 17 December 1972 (age 53)
- Place of birth: Hackney, England
- Position: Striker

Senior career*
Years	Team	Apps	(Gls)
1991	Leyton-Wingate		
1991–1992	Collier Row		
1992–1993	Leyton		
1993–1994	Collier Row		
1992–1993	Leyton		
1995	Bishop's Stortford		
1995–1998	Exeter City	66	(9)
1997–1998	→ Welling United (loan)	5	(1)
1998–1999	St Patrick's Athletic		
1999–2000	Welling United	34	(15)
2000–2003	Margate (Note: The Margate appearances and goals only cover the 2001–02 and 2002–03 seasons.)	74	(27)
2003–2004	Dagenham & Redbridge	34	(5)
2004–2005	Fisher Athletic		
2005	Margate		
2005–2006	Ilford		
2006	Erith & Belvedere		
2006	Great Wakering Rovers		
2006–2007	Enfield Town		
2007	Redbridge		
2008	Heybridge Swifts		
2011	Red Lion Stanstead Abbotts		

International career
2002	England C	1	(0)
- * Club domestic league appearances and goals

Leon Jerome Braithwaite (born 17 December 1972) is an English former footballer. He played for Exeter City, making a total of 66 Football League appearances. He made appearances for Margate, scoring 38 goals. He joined Margate from Welling United in 2000 and had two spells with the club, leaving for the second time in 2005. Braithwaite's spell at St. Patrick's Athletic in the League of Ireland was notable for a number of key goals, including a winning goal against title rivals Cork City in Turner's Cross. Leon won two league of Ireland championship medals with St Patricks Athletics and represented the club in the champions league qualifier where he was influential in the 0–0 draw against Glasgow Celtic FC at Park's head in front of a full house of 60000 supporters only to lose the return leg 0:2 Leon got called up to the Trinidad and Tobago squad, yet did not make his debut due to injury

== Personal life ==
He is the brother of athlete Darren Braithwaite. Leon and his brother Darren coach talented Junior athletes in track and field mainly in the 100m & 200m sprints Like his brother Leon has represented GB Vets in athletics. Leon Has a MSc in sports psychology

== Honours ==
League of Ireland: 2

- St. Patrick's Athletic - 1997/98, 1998/99
- 1 England non league cap vs USA
- League of Ireland league supporters player of the Month February 1998
- At the time, held the record for the fastest league hat-trick in Conference History for Margate FC vs Woking (17 mins). This was better however at Christmas 2006 by Crawley Town's Charles Adameno, who scored a hat-trick within the first eight minutes of the club's league match at Grays Athletic.
