= Billy Windle =

English footballer

Personal information
- Full name: William Henry Windle
- Date of birth: 9 July 1920
- Place of birth: Maltby, England
- Date of death: 4 November 2011 (aged 91)
- Place of death: Chester, England
- Position: Winger

Youth career
- Denaby United

Senior career*
Years	Team	Apps	(Gls)
1947	Leeds United	2	(0)
1947–1951	Lincoln City	91	(22)
1951–1955	Chester	127	(20)
- Caernarfon Town
Total		220	(42)
- * Club domestic league appearances and goals

Billy Windle (1920–2011) was an English footballer, who played as a winger in the Football League for Chester.
