= Fred Sutcliffe =

English footballer (1931–1972)

Personal information
- Full name: Fred Sutcliffe
- Date of birth: 29 May 1931
- Place of birth: Brotherton, Yorkshire, England
- Date of death: 10 February 1972 (aged 40)
- Place of death: Chester, Cheshire, England
- Positions: Inside left; wing half

Senior career*
Years	Team	Apps	(Gls)
1951–1952	Birmingham City	0	(0)
1952–1955	Chester	50	(2)
1955	Northwich Victoria		
1955–1958	Winsford United		
1958–19??	Northwich Victoria		
- * Club domestic league appearances and goals

Fred Sutcliffe (29 May 1931 – 10 February 1972) was an English footballer who played as an inside left or wing half in the Football League for Chester. He was on the books of Birmingham City without playing for their first team, and went on to play non-league football for Northwich Victoria (two spells) and Winsford United.

Sutcliffe died in Chester on 10 February 1972, at the age of 40.
