= George Pilkington (footballer, born 1926) =

English footballer

Personal information
- Full name: George Pilkington
- Date of birth: 3 June 1926
- Place of birth: Hemsworth, England
- Date of death: May 2016 (aged 89)
- Place of death: Rotherham, England
- Positions: Full back; wing half

Youth career
- Great Houghton

Senior career*
| Years | Team | Apps | (Gls) |
| 1949–1950 | Rotherham United | 1 | (0) |
| 1952–1953 | Chester | 16 | (0) |
| 1953–1956 | Stockport County | 77 | (4) |
| Total | | 94 | (4) |
- * Club domestic league appearances and goals

George Pilkington (3 June 1926 – May 2016) was an English footballer who played as a full back or wing half in the Football League for Rotherham United, Chester and Stockport County.
