= Matt Costello (footballer) =

Scottish footballer

Personal information
- Full name: Matthew Costello
- Date of birth: 4 August 1924
- Place of birth: Airdrie, Scotland
- Date of death: 27 November 1987 (aged 63)
- Place of death: Melton Mowbray, England
- Position: Winger

Senior career*
Years	Team	Apps	(Gls)
1949–1952	Chesterfield	18	(2)
1952–1953	Chester	9	(2)
Total		27	(4)
- * Club domestic league appearances and goals

Matt Costello (4 August 1924 – 27 November 1987) was a Scottish footballer, who played as a winger in the Football League for Chesterfield and Chester.
