= 1952–53 Southern Football League =

The 1952–53 Southern Football League season was the 50th in the history of the league, an English football competition.

No new clubs had joined the league for this season so the league consisted of 22 clubs from previous season. Headington United were champions for the first time in their history. Five Southern League clubs applied to join the Football League at the end of the season, but none were successful.

== League table ==
Southern Football League
- Season: 1952–53
- Champions: Headington United
- Matches: 462
- Goals: 1,660 (3.59 per match)

Pos	Team	Pld	W	D	L	GF	GA	GR	Pts
1	Headington United	42	23	12	7	93	50	1.860	58
2	Merthyr Tydfil	42	25	8	9	117	66	1.773	58
3	Bedford Town	42	24	8	10	91	61	1.492	56
4	Kettering Town	42	23	8	11	88	50	1.760	54
5	Bath City	42	22	10	10	71	46	1.543	54
6	Worcester City	42	20	11	11	100	66	1.515	51
7	Llanelly	42	21	9	12	95	72	1.319	51
8	Barry Town	42	22	3	17	89	69	1.290	47
9	Gravesend & Northfleet	42	19	7	16	83	76	1.092	45
10	Gloucester City	42	17	9	16	50	78	0.641	43
11	Guildford City	42	17	8	17	64	60	1.067	42
12	Hastings United	42	18	5	19	75	66	1.136	41
13	Cheltenham Town	42	15	11	16	70	89	0.787	41
14	Weymouth	42	15	10	17	70	75	0.933	40
15	Hereford United	42	17	5	20	76	73	1.041	39
16	Tonbridge	42	12	9	21	62	88	0.705	33
17	Lovell's Athletic	42	12	8	22	68	81	0.840	32
18	Yeovil Town	42	11	10	21	75	99	0.758	32
19	Chelmsford City	42	12	7	23	58	92	0.630	31
20	Exeter City Reserves	42	13	4	25	71	94	0.755	30
21	Kidderminster Harriers	42	12	5	25	54	85	0.635	29
22	Dartford	42	6	5	31	40	121	0.331	17

Source: rsssf.com
Rules for classification: 1) points; 2) goal ratio.

== Football League elections ==
Five Southern League clubs applied for election to the Football League. However, none were successful as all four League clubs were re-elected.

Club	League	Votes
Shrewsbury Town	Football League	46
Accrington Stanley	Football League	45
Walsall	Football League	41
Workington	Football League	36
Wigan Athletic	Lancashire Combination	17
Peterborough United	Midland League	6
Yeovil Town	Southern League	2
Bath City	Southern League	2
Headington United	Southern League	0
Hereford United	Southern League	1
Nelson	Lancashire Combination	0
New Brighton	Lancashire Combination	0
North Shields	North Eastern League	0
Worcester City	Southern League	0
