= 1952–53 Football League =

54th season of the Football League

The Football League
- Season: 1952–53
- Champions: Arsenal

The 1952–53 season was the 54th completed season of The Football League.

== Final league tables ==
The tables below are reproduced here in the exact form that they can be found at The Rec.Sport.Soccer Statistics Foundation website and in Rothmans Book of Football League Records 1888–89 to 1978–79, with home and away statistics separated.

Beginning with the season 1894–95, clubs finishing level on points were separated according to goal average (goals scored divided by goals conceded), or more properly put, goal ratio. In case one or more teams had the same goal difference, this system favoured those teams who had scored fewer goals. The goal average system was eventually scrapped beginning with the 1976–77 season.

From the 1922–23 season, the bottom two teams of both Third Division North and Third Division South were required to apply for re-election.

== First Division ==
First Division
- Season: 1952–53
- Champions: Arsenal; 7th English title
- Matches: 462
- Goals: 1,508 (3.26 per match)
- Top goalscorer: Charlie Wayman (24 goals)
- Biggest home win: Tottenham Hotspur 7–1 Middlesbrough (25 December 1952); Aston Villa 6–0 Portsmouth (18 February 1953); Cardiff City 6–0 Manchester City (21 February 1953)
- Biggest away win: Bolton Wanderers 0–5 Portsmouth (20 September 1952); Preston North End 0–5 Manchester United (18 October 1952)
- Highest scoring: Blackpool 8–4 Charlton Athletic (27 September 1952)

Arsenal won their second league title of the postwar era, finishing ahead of runners-up Preston North End on goal average - denying them a first league title since they won the first two English Football League titles more than 60 years earlier. Preston defeated Arsenal in a 2-0 home win in the second last match of the season on 25 April, which was followed by another win at Derby four days later. But Arsenal's 3-2 win in their final match against Burnley on 1 May meant that it was Arsenal who clinched the title on goal average.

Wolverhampton Wanderers bounced back after two disappointing seasons to finish third, three points short of the title. They finished one point ahead of their local rivals West Bromwich Albion. Twelve goals were scored when Blackpool defeated Charlton Athletic 8-4 on 25 September, but Charlton would eventually finish two places higher in the table at fifth place. Defending champions Manchester United, in a period of transition as the team captained by Johnny Carey started to make way for a younger generation of players, finished eighth.

Stoke City and Derby County, who had been among the First Division's leading lights in the first few postwar seasons, went down to the Second Division after several seasons of gradually declining form. Liverpool, the 1947 champions, avoided the drop by just two points.

Pos	Team	Pld	W	D	L	GF	GA	GAv	Pts	Relegation
1	Arsenal (C)	42	21	12	9	97	64	1.516	54	
2	Preston North End	42	21	12	9	85	60	1.417	54	
3	Wolverhampton Wanderers	42	19	13	10	86	63	1.365	51	
4	West Bromwich Albion	42	21	8	13	66	60	1.100	50	
5	Charlton Athletic	42	19	11	12	77	63	1.222	49	
6	Burnley	42	18	12	12	67	52	1.288	48	
7	Blackpool	42	19	9	14	71	70	1.014	47	
8	Manchester United	42	18	10	14	69	72	0.958	46	
9	Sunderland	42	15	13	14	68	82	0.829	43	
10	Tottenham Hotspur	42	15	11	16	78	69	1.130	41	
11	Aston Villa	42	14	13	15	63	61	1.033	41	
12	Cardiff City	42	14	12	16	54	46	1.174	40	
13	Middlesbrough	42	14	11	17	70	77	0.909	39	
14	Bolton Wanderers	42	15	9	18	61	69	0.884	39	
15	Portsmouth	42	14	10	18	74	83	0.892	38	
16	Newcastle United	42	14	9	19	59	70	0.843	37	
17	Liverpool	42	14	8	20	61	82	0.744	36	
18	Sheffield Wednesday	42	12	11	19	62	72	0.861	35	
19	Chelsea	42	12	11	19	56	66	0.848	35	
20	Manchester City	42	14	7	21	72	87	0.828	35	
21	Stoke City (R)	42	12	10	20	53	66	0.803	34	Relegation to the Second Division
22	Derby County (R)	42	11	10	21	59	74	0.797	32	Relegation to the Second Division

Source: World Football
Rules for classification: 1) Points; 2) Goal average; 3) Goals scored
(C) Champions; (R) Relegated

=== Results ===
Home \ Away	ARS	AST	BLP	BOL	BUR	CAR	CHA	CHE	DER	LIV	MCI	MUN	MID	NEW	POR	PNE	SHW	STK	SUN	TOT	WBA	WOL
Arsenal		3–1	3–1	4–1	3–2	0–1	3–4	2–0	6–2	5–3	3–1	2–1	2–1	3–0	3–1	1–1	2–2	3–1	1–2	4–0	2–2	5–3
Aston Villa	1–2		1–5	1–1	2–0	2–0	1–1	1–1	3–0	4–0	0–0	3–3	1–0	0–1	6–0	1–0	4–3	1–1	3–0	0–3	1–1	0–1
Blackpool	3–2	1–1		3–0	4–2	0–1	8–4	3–1	2–1	3–1	4–1	0–0	1–1	0–2	3–2	1–1	0–1	1–1	2–0	2–0	2–0	2–0
Bolton Wanderers	4–6	0–0	4–0		1–2	0–1	1–2	1–1	2–0	2–2	1–0	2–1	5–3	4–2	0–5	0–3	1–1	2–1	5–0	2–3	0–1	2–1
Burnley	1–1	1–0	0–1	0–1		0–0	2–0	1–1	1–2	2–0	2–1	2–1	0–1	2–1	3–2	2–2	1–1	3–2	5–1	3–2	5–0	0–0
Cardiff City	0–0	1–2	2–2	1–0	0–0		0–1	3–3	2–0	4–0	6–0	1–2	1–1	0–0	0–1	0–2	4–0	2–0	4–1	0–0	1–2	0–0
Charlton Athletic	2–2	5–1	2–0	2–0	0–0	3–1		2–2	3–1	3–2	1–2	2–2	2–0	0–0	2–2	2–1	3–0	5–1	3–1	3–2	0–0	2–2
Chelsea	1–1	4–0	4–0	1–0	0–2	0–2	0–1		1–1	3–0	3–1	2–3	1–1	1–2	2–0	5–3	1–0	0–0	3–2	2–1	0–2	1–2
Derby County	2–0	0–1	1–1	4–3	1–3	1–1	1–1	3–2		3–2	5–0	2–3	3–3	0–2	3–0	0–1	2–1	4–0	3–1	0–0	1–1	2–3
Liverpool	1–5	0–2	2–2	0–0	1–1	2–1	1–2	2–0	1–1		0–1	1–2	4–1	5–3	1–1	2–2	1–0	3–2	2–0	2–1	3–0	2–1
Manchester City	2–4	4–1	5–0	1–2	0–0	2–2	5–1	4–0	1–0	0–2		2–1	5–1	2–1	2–1	0–2	3–1	2–1	2–5	0–1	0–1	3–1
Manchester United	0–0	3–1	2–1	1–0	1–3	1–4	3–2	2–0	1–0	3–1	1–1		3–2	2–2	1–0	5–2	1–1	0–2	0–1	3–2	2–2	0–3
Middlesbrough	2–0	1–0	5–1	1–2	2–2	3–0	1–0	4–0	1–0	2–3	5–4	5–0		2–1	3–2	1–1	2–2	0–0	1–2	0–4	4–2	1–1
Newcastle United	2–2	2–1	0–1	2–3	0–0	3–0	3–2	2–1	1–0	1–2	2–0	1–2	1–0		1–0	4–3	1–5	1–2	2–2	1–1	3–5	1–1
Portsmouth	2–2	1–1	0–2	3–1	2–1	0–2	1–1	2–0	2–2	3–1	2–1	2–0	1–4	5–1		2–5	5–2	1–1	5–2	2–1	1–2	2–2
Preston North End	2–0	1–3	4–2	2–2	2–1	2–3	2–1	2–1	3–0	1–1	6–2	0–5	3–0	2–1	4–0		1–0	3–0	3–2	1–0	1–0	1–1
Sheffield Wednesday	1–4	2–2	2–0	1–1	2–4	2–0	0–3	1–0	2–0	0–2	1–1	0–0	2–0	2–2	3–4	1–1		1–0	4–0	2–0	4–5	2–3
Stoke City	1–1	1–4	4–0	1–2	1–3	0–0	1–0	1–1	1–2	3–1	2–1	3–1	1–0	1–0	2–4	0–0	1–3		3–0	2–0	5–1	1–2
Sunderland	3–1	2–2	1–1	2–0	2–1	4–2	2–1	2–1	2–1	3–1	3–3	2–2	1–1	0–2	1–1	2–2	2–1	1–1		1–1	1–0	5–2
Tottenham Hotspur	1–3	1–1	4–0	1–1	2–1	2–1	2–0	2–3	5–2	3–1	3–3	1–2	7–1	3–2	3–3	4–4	2–1	1–0	2–2		3–4	3–2
West Bromwich Albion	2–0	3–2	0–1	0–1	1–2	1–0	3–1	0–1	2–2	3–0	2–1	3–1	3–0	1–0	2–0	2–1	0–1	3–2	1–1	2–1		1–1
Wolverhampton Wanderers	1–1	2–1	2–5	3–1	5–1	1–0	1–2	2–2	3–1	3–0	7–3	6–2	3–3	2–0	4–1	0–2	3–1	3–0	1–1	0–0	2–0	

Updated to match(es) played on unknown. Source: Ian Laschke: Rothmans Book of Football League Records 1888–89 to 1978–79. Macdonald and Jane’s, London & Sydney, 1980.
Legend: Blue = home team win; Yellow = draw; Red = away team win.

=== Maps ===
Locations of the Football League First Division London teams 1952–1953
Locations of the Football League First Division 1952–1953 teams

== Second Division ==
Second Division
- Season: 1952–53
- Champions: Sheffield United
- Promoted: Sheffield United; Huddersfield Town
- Relegated: Southampton; Barnsley
- Matches: 462
- Goals: 1,535 (3.32 per match)
- Top goalscorer: Arthur Rowley (39 goals)

Sheffield United were champions of the Second Division, scoring 97 goals in the process. Their season included two runs of eleven league matches in a row without defeat, in October-December and February-April respectively.

Huddersfield Town finished second, two points behind and were promoted to the First Division. Luton Town were contenders for promotion, but a poor finish without a win in their last four games left them six points behind Huddersfield in third place.

Everton recorded their lowest ever league position, finishing 16th in an uneven season that included a 7-1 victory over Doncaster and a 8-2 defeat against Huddersfield.

Southampton were relegated along with Barnsley, who finished bottom after a poor season that included just five wins, 108 conceded goals and a late run of nine consecutive defeats.

Pos	Team	Pld	W	D	L	GF	GA	GAv	Pts	Qualification or relegation
1	Sheffield United (C, P)	42	25	10	7	97	55	1.764	60	Promotion to the First Division
2	Huddersfield Town (P)	42	24	10	8	84	33	2.545	58	Promotion to the First Division
3	Luton Town	42	22	8	12	84	49	1.714	52	
4	Plymouth Argyle	42	20	9	13	65	60	1.083	49	
5	Leicester City	42	18	12	12	89	74	1.203	48	
6	Birmingham City	42	19	10	13	71	66	1.076	48	
7	Nottingham Forest	42	18	8	16	77	67	1.149	44	
8	Fulham	42	17	10	15	81	71	1.141	44	
9	Blackburn Rovers	42	18	8	16	68	65	1.046	44	
10	Leeds United	42	14	15	13	71	63	1.127	43	
11	Swansea Town	42	15	12	15	78	81	0.963	42	
12	Rotherham United	42	16	9	17	75	74	1.014	41	
13	Doncaster Rovers	42	12	16	14	58	64	0.906	40	
14	West Ham United	42	13	13	16	58	60	0.967	39	
15	Lincoln City	42	11	17	14	64	71	0.901	39	
16	Everton	42	12	14	16	71	75	0.947	38	
17	Brentford	42	13	11	18	59	76	0.776	37	
18	Hull City	42	14	8	20	57	69	0.826	36	
19	Notts County	42	14	8	20	60	88	0.682	36	
20	Bury	42	13	9	20	53	81	0.654	35	
21	Southampton (R)	42	10	13	19	68	85	0.800	33	Relegation to the Third Division South
22	Barnsley (R)	42	5	8	29	47	108	0.435	18	Relegation to the Third Division North

Rules for classification: 1) Points; 2) Goal average; 3) Goals scored
(C) Champions; (P) Promoted; (R) Relegated

=== Results ===
Home \ Away	BAR	BIR	BLB	BRE	BRY	DON	EVE	FUL	HUD	HUL	LEE	LEI	LIN	LUT	NOT	NTC	PLY	ROT	SHU	SOU	SWA	WHU
Barnsley		1–3	1–4	0–2	3–2	2–2	2–3	1–1	2–4	5–1	2–2	0–3	1–1	2–3	0–2	1–2	0–3	2–3	1–3	0–1	3–1	2–0
Birmingham	3–1		1–2	3–1	0–2	2–1	4–2	1–4	0–2	4–3	2–2	3–1	2–2	2–2	0–5	3–2	4–0	4–0	1–2	2–0	1–4	2–0
Blackburn Rovers	2–0	1–2		3–0	4–0	2–1	3–1	2–2	1–1	2–0	1–1	2–0	0–2	1–1	2–1	3–2	1–3	0–1	1–2	3–0	3–0	3–0
Brentford	4–0	1–2	3–2		2–2	1–0	2–4	2–2	1–3	1–0	3–3	4–2	1–0	1–1	1–1	5–0	1–2	1–1	0–0	3–0	0–0	1–4
Bury	5–2	3–0	1–0	3–0		2–1	0–5	1–1	1–1	2–1	2–2	1–4	2–2	1–0	2–0	0–1	3–2	2–0	0–4	0–0	1–3	1–1
Doncaster Rovers	1–1	1–0	3–3	0–2	1–1		3–0	0–0	1–1	3–1	0–0	0–0	2–0	1–0	1–0	2–0	1–1	2–1	0–2	1–0	2–3	1–1
Everton	2–1	1–1	0–3	5–0	3–0	7–1		3–3	2–1	0–2	2–2	2–2	0–3	1–1	3–0	1–0	2–0	0–1	0–0	2–2	0–0	2–0
Fulham	3–1	3–1	2–1	5–0	2–0	1–3	3–0		0–2	2–1	2–1	4–6	4–2	2–0	0–1	6–0	2–1	4–1	1–2	1–1	3–1	2–3
Huddersfield Town	6–0	1–1	0–3	0–0	2–0	3–1	8–2	4–2		1–1	1–0	1–0	5–0	3–0	1–2	1–0	4–0	1–0	1–1	5–0	3–0	0–1
Hull City	2–2	2–0	3–0	2–2	0–2	1–1	1–0	3–1	0–2		1–0	1–1	1–1	0–2	3–1	6–0	0–1	3–2	4–0	1–0	1–1	1–0
Leeds United	4–1	0–1	0–3	3–2	2–0	1–1	2–0	2–0	2–1	3–1		0–1	2–1	2–2	2–1	3–1	1–1	4–0	0–3	1–1	5–1	3–2
Leicester City	2–2	3–4	2–1	2–3	3–2	4–2	4–2	6–1	2–1	5–0	3–3		3–2	1–1	1–1	3–0	2–0	3–2	0–0	4–1	2–1	0–0
Lincoln City	1–1	1–1	4–1	0–0	4–0	2–0	1–1	2–2	2–2	2–1	1–1	3–2		1–2	2–3	3–0	0–0	1–3	3–2	2–2	3–1	3–1
Luton Town	6–0	0–1	6–0	0–1	4–1	1–2	4–2	2–0	0–2	3–2	2–0	2–0	4–0		3–0	5–1	1–0	2–1	4–1	1–2	3–1	0–0
Nottingham Forest	3–0	0–2	1–2	3–0	4–1	2–2	3–3	0–1	1–0	4–1	2–1	1–3	1–1	4–3		1–0	3–1	4–3	1–1	2–3	6–4	0–0
Notts County	1–0	2–0	5–0	4–0	2–1	4–3	2–2	1–1	1–0	2–0	3–2	2–2	1–1	1–2	3–2		0–4	2–1	0–3	1–2	3–4	1–1
Plymouth Argyle	4–0	2–1	3–1	1–0	0–0	0–0	1–0	3–1	0–2	1–2	0–1	2–1	0–0	2–1	0–3	2–2		4–3	5–2	3–1	3–2	1–1
Rotherham United	3–1	1–1	0–0	4–1	6–1	4–2	2–2	1–0	0–0	2–1	3–1	0–0	3–2	1–3	2–3	2–3	2–3		0–2	2–2	2–1	1–1
Sheffield United	3–0	2–2	3–0	3–2	3–1	2–2	1–0	2–1	0–2	0–2	2–1	7–2	6–1	1–1	2–0	2–1	5–0	1–4		5–3	7–1	3–1
Southampton	1–2	1–1	6–1	0–2	1–2	3–3	1–1	5–3	0–2	5–1	2–2	5–2	1–0	1–3	2–2	1–1	2–3	2–3	4–4		1–4	1–2
Swansea Town	3–0	1–1	1–1	3–2	2–0	2–1	2–2	1–1	3–3	3–0	3–2	1–1	1–1	4–2	2–1	5–1	2–2	0–0	1–2	1–2		4–1
West Ham United	3–1	1–2	0–0	3–1	3–2	1–3	3–1	1–2	0–1	0–0	2–2	4–1	5–1	0–1	3–2	2–2	0–1	2–4	1–1	1–0	3–0	

Updated to match(es) played on unknown. Source: Ian Laschke: Rothmans Book of Football League Records 1888–89 to 1978–79. Macdonald and Jane’s, London & Sydney, 1980.
Legend: Blue = home team win; Yellow = draw; Red = away team win.

=== Maps ===
Locations of the Football League Second Division London teams 1952–1953
Locations of the Football League Second Division 1952–1953 teams

== Third Division North ==
Football League Third Division North
- Season: 1952–53
- Champions: Oldham Athletic (1st title)
- Failed re-election: none
- Matches: 552
- Goals: 1,604 (2.91 per match)
- Top goalscorer: Jimmy Whitehouse (Carlisle United), 29

Pos	Team	Pld	W	D	L	GF	GA	GAv	Pts	Promotion or relegation
1	Oldham Athletic (C, P)	46	22	15	9	77	45	1.711	59	Promotion to the Second Division
2	Port Vale	46	20	18	8	67	35	1.914	58	
3	Wrexham	46	24	8	14	86	66	1.303	56	
4	York City	46	20	13	13	60	45	1.333	53	
5	Grimsby Town	46	21	10	15	75	59	1.271	52	
6	Southport	46	20	11	15	63	60	1.050	51	
7	Bradford (Park Avenue)	46	19	12	15	75	61	1.230	50	
8	Gateshead	46	17	15	14	76	60	1.267	49	
9	Carlisle United	46	18	13	15	82	68	1.206	49	
10	Crewe Alexandra	46	20	8	18	70	68	1.029	48	
11	Stockport County	46	17	13	16	82	69	1.188	47	
12	Chesterfield	46	18	11	17	65	63	1.032	47	
13	Tranmere Rovers	46	21	5	20	65	63	1.032	47	
14	Halifax Town	46	16	15	15	68	68	1.000	47	
15	Scunthorpe & Lindsey United	46	16	14	16	62	56	1.107	46	
16	Bradford City	46	14	18	14	75	80	0.938	46	
17	Hartlepools United	46	16	14	16	57	61	0.934	46	
18	Mansfield Town	46	16	14	16	55	62	0.887	46	
19	Barrow	46	16	12	18	66	71	0.930	44	
20	Chester	46	11	15	20	64	85	0.753	37	
21	Darlington	46	14	6	26	58	96	0.604	34	
22	Rochdale	46	14	5	27	62	83	0.747	33	
23	Workington	46	11	10	25	55	91	0.604	32	Re-elected
24	Accrington Stanley	46	8	11	27	39	89	0.438	27	Re-elected

Source: rsssf.com
(C) Division Champions; (P) Promoted

=== Results ===
Home \ Away	ACC	BRW	BRA	BPA	CRL	CHE	CHF	CRE	DAR	GAT	GRI	HAL	HAR	MAN	OLD	PTV	ROC	SCU	SOU	STP	TRA	WRK	WRE	YOR
Accrington Stanley		1–0	1–1	3–2	1–0	1–1	1–1	1–1	1–0	1–1	1–2	1–1	1–1	2–2	0–2	1–1	2–1	2–1	1–2	1–4	0–2	0–1	1–2	1–0
Barrow	2–0		5–1	2–0	0–0	3–0	2–1	1–2	2–2	2–2	1–1	5–1	2–1	3–0	4–3	1–2	2–1	2–1	1–1	1–0	2–0	3–0	1–1	1–0
Bradford City	3–2	2–2		2–1	7–2	2–2	2–1	1–3	4–3	3–1	1–0	5–0	1–1	2–1	0–0	1–0	0–3	0–0	2–2	3–0	5–3	4–0	3–1	1–1
Bradford Park Avenue	4–0	1–0	2–2		2–2	1–0	0–1	1–0	3–0	3–0	0–3	1–2	1–1	1–1	0–0	2–2	2–1	1–1	1–0	1–1	1–0	6–1	1–2	2–3
Carlisle United	4–4	0–0	4–4	1–3		1–1	3–0	1–2	4–2	2–2	3–0	1–2	4–1	1–0	0–0	2–0	5–0	8–0	2–0	2–1	4–0	3–1	1–0	1–1
Chester	2–0	2–1	2–0	0–3	1–2		2–0	2–2	6–3	2–0	0–2	2–1	0–1	2–2	0–1	2–2	3–0	1–1	0–0	4–0	3–2	1–1	1–2	1–1
Chesterfield	3–0	1–1	1–1	1–1	4–2	2–1		1–0	3–0	1–1	3–2	2–1	2–0	4–1	1–2	1–0	1–0	1–1	1–2	2–1	1–2	1–1	2–1	1–2
Crewe Alexandra	3–2	1–1	1–1	2–3	2–2	4–1	2–1		0–1	4–3	1–2	1–1	2–0	1–0	0–1	1–4	4–2	2–0	2–0	2–0	1–0	4–0	3–3	3–0
Darlington	1–0	1–0	4–1	1–3	0–0	3–2	3–1	1–1		1–0	1–1	0–2	3–0	2–1	0–5	0–2	3–2	1–0	3–1	1–0	1–2	1–0	2–2	0–1
Gateshead	5–0	3–1	2–2	3–2	2–0	4–1	2–4	6–1	5–1		2–0	3–1	1–1	1–2	1–0	1–1	3–1	1–1	1–2	2–0	0–1	1–1	1–0	1–1
Grimsby Town	3–0	2–1	0–0	2–3	2–3	5–4	0–0	1–0	2–0	0–0		2–0	7–0	5–1	1–1	1–1	3–2	1–0	1–0	0–1	3–1	2–0	2–0	2–1
Halifax Town	3–0	1–0	1–1	2–4	2–1	3–1	3–1	1–3	3–2	1–3	3–2		3–2	1–2	2–2	1–2	3–1	2–1	4–1	3–0	0–0	5–2	0–0	0–0
Hartlepool	4–1	2–0	0–0	0–1	1–0	2–2	2–0	2–1	1–0	0–0	2–0	0–0		2–0	4–1	2–0	2–1	1–1	3–0	0–2	4–1	2–2	1–2	2–1
Mansfield Town	0–0	2–2	3–1	1–1	2–1	2–2	1–4	3–0	3–2	2–0	1–1	2–1	2–0		0–2	1–0	2–1	1–0	2–2	2–2	1–0	0–0	0–2	1–1
Oldham Athletic	3–0	3–0	2–0	2–1	2–4	2–1	1–1	0–1	5–0	1–1	1–1	1–0	4–2	1–0		0–1	1–0	0–1	3–0	1–1	5–2	4–1	4–2	2–1
Port Vale	0–1	3–0	0–0	1–0	0–0	1–1	3–0	3–1	2–1	1–1	4–0	1–1	3–0	1–1	1–1		5–2	4–0	0–0	2–0	2–0	2–0	0–0	2–0
Rochdale	1–0	6–2	2–1	1–0	1–2	3–1	0–2	0–1	3–1	2–3	0–2	1–1	3–1	1–0	3–1	1–1		2–2	0–0	2–2	3–0	2–0	4–1	0–3
Scunthorpe & Lindsey United	5–2	1–2	4–0	1–2	1–2	1–1	1–0	2–0	2–0	0–0	0–1	1–1	0–0	0–1	1–1	1–2	5–1		3–0	2–2	2–0	2–1	1–2	2–0
Southport	1–0	3–2	3–0	2–2	2–0	2–0	1–0	3–0	3–0	3–2	4–3	1–1	0–0	1–3	1–0	0–0	1–0	2–3		3–0	1–2	2–0	1–0	3–1
Stockport County	3–1	6–1	6–1	2–0	3–0	4–1	4–1	2–4	2–2	3–1	2–2	1–1	1–1	2–2	1–1	0–2	2–0	1–1	3–0		3–2	6–0	3–1	1–1
Tranmere	2–0	2–0	3–1	4–0	4–1	4–0	3–1	1–0	5–2	2–0	2–1	0–0	0–2	1–0	0–0	1–1	1–0	0–1	1–1	1–0		3–0	4–2	1–3
Workington	3–0	3–1	3–2	2–2	1–1	1–2	2–3	4–0	3–1	0–2	3–1	2–0	1–1	0–1	1–1	1–1	1–2	0–3	2–4	0–2	2–0		4–0	1–3
Wrexham	3–1	4–0	2–1	0–3	3–0	7–0	2–2	1–0	4–2	1–0	3–1	2–1	3–2	1–0	2–2	3–1	3–0	2–3	3–2	5–2	1–0	3–0		1–1
York City	2–0	1–1	0–0	3–1	1–0	0–0	0–0	2–1	3–0	1–2	2–0	2–2	1–0	2–0	1–2	1–0	2–0	0–2	3–1	3–0	2–0	1–3	2–1	

Updated to match(es) played on unknown. Source: Ian Laschke: Rothmans Book of Football League Records 1888–89 to 1978–79. Macdonald and Jane’s, London & Sydney, 1980.
Legend: Blue = home team win; Yellow = draw; Red = away team win.

=== Maps ===
Locations of the Football League Third Division North teams 1952–1953

== Third Division South ==
Football League Third Division South
- Season: 1952–53
- Champions: Bristol Rovers (1st title)
- Failed re-election: none
- Matches: 552
- Goals: 1,745 (3.16 per match)
- Top goalscorer: Geoff Bradford (Bristol Rovers), 33

Pos	Team	Pld	W	D	L	GF	GA	GAv	Pts	Qualification or relegation
1	Bristol Rovers (C, P)	46	26	12	8	92	46	2.000	64	Promotion to the Second Division
2	Millwall	46	24	14	8	82	44	1.864	62	
3	Northampton Town	46	26	10	10	109	70	1.557	62	
4	Norwich City	46	25	10	11	99	55	1.800	60	
5	Bristol City	46	22	15	9	95	61	1.557	59	
6	Coventry City	46	19	12	15	77	62	1.242	50	
7	Brighton & Hove Albion	46	19	12	15	81	75	1.080	50	
8	Southend United	46	18	13	15	69	74	0.932	49	
9	Bournemouth & Boscombe Athletic	46	19	9	18	74	69	1.072	47	
10	Watford	46	15	17	14	62	63	0.984	47	
11	Reading	46	19	8	19	69	64	1.078	46	
12	Torquay United	46	18	9	19	87	88	0.989	45	
13	Crystal Palace	46	15	13	18	66	82	0.805	43	
14	Leyton Orient	46	16	10	20	68	73	0.932	42	
15	Newport County	46	16	10	20	70	82	0.854	42	
16	Ipswich Town	46	13	15	18	60	69	0.870	41	
17	Exeter City	46	13	14	19	61	71	0.859	40	
18	Swindon Town	46	14	12	20	64	79	0.810	40	
19	Aldershot	46	12	15	19	61	77	0.792	39	
20	Queens Park Rangers	46	12	15	19	61	82	0.744	39	
21	Gillingham	46	12	15	19	55	74	0.743	39	
22	Colchester United	46	12	14	20	59	76	0.776	38	
23	Shrewsbury Town	46	12	12	22	68	91	0.747	36	Re-elected
24	Walsall	46	7	10	29	56	118	0.475	24	Re-elected

(C) Champions; (P) Promoted

=== Results ===
Home \ Away	ALD	B&BA	B&HA	BRI	BRR	COL	COV	CRY	EXE	GIL	IPS	LEY	MIL	NPC	NOR	NWC	QPR	REA	SHR	STD	SWI	TOR	WAL	WAT
Aldershot		1–0	1–2	1–2	0–0	0–0	4–1	0–1	1–1	3–2	1–1	2–0	1–2	2–2	2–1	1–2	4–1	2–2	4–2	1–1	2–2	0–2	2–0	1–2
Bournemouth & Boscombe Athletic	0–3		2–1	4–1	1–2	1–0	3–0	4–2	2–1	4–2	2–1	4–1	1–1	1–2	0–1	0–0	1–0	2–0	2–0	5–1	1–1	0–1	5–1	4–1
Brighton & Hove Albion	4–2	2–0		0–1	2–1	0–0	1–1	4–1	4–2	5–0	1–4	3–1	1–0	2–2	1–1	2–3	2–0	1–1	3–1	2–2	1–2	2–1	4–2	1–2
Bristol City	0–0	1–1	2–2		0–0	3–2	1–0	5–0	4–1	4–0	4–2	2–1	0–0	2–0	2–3	0–1	4–4	1–1	3–2	5–0	4–2	4–4	6–1	5–1
Bristol Rovers	4–1	2–1	7–0	0–0		3–1	5–2	2–0	0–0	3–1	3–0	2–1	1–1	3–1	1–1	3–1	2–1	4–0	2–1	2–1	1–2	3–0	2–0	0–3
Colchester United	1–2	1–1	0–0	3–1	0–3		0–1	3–0	3–1	1–1	0–0	3–1	0–0	3–3	1–2	0–4	1–1	2–1	1–0	3–3	3–1	4–1	6–1	1–1
Coventry City	3–0	2–3	3–1	2–2	1–1	2–2		4–2	1–0	2–1	2–0	3–0	4–1	0–1	1–1	2–1	2–0	4–0	0–0	2–1	1–2	7–2	3–1	1–0
Crystal Palace	3–0	1–0	2–1	1–3	1–0	3–1	2–2		2–0	0–0	1–1	2–2	0–1	2–1	4–3	1–1	4–2	0–3	1–2	0–0	3–0	2–2	4–1	1–0
Exeter City	2–2	5–1	1–5	1–1	0–0	2–0	1–0	2–0		0–0	1–1	0–1	1–0	3–2	2–0	1–0	2–2	2–0	2–2	0–2	1–2	4–1	6–1	1–1
Gillingham	2–0	1–2	1–2	0–1	0–4	1–1	0–0	1–0	1–0		1–1	3–2	0–1	1–1	1–1	0–3	3–0	2–1	4–2	1–1	0–0	2–1	3–1	2–1
Ipswich Town	2–1	2–1	1–0	1–0	1–5	2–2	3–0	2–0	0–1	1–1		0–1	1–6	3–0	1–1	2–1	0–1	1–2	2–1	0–0	1–1	2–2	5–0	1–1
Leyton Orient	4–1	2–2	3–0	1–3	3–3	5–3	1–2	0–0	2–0	1–1	3–1		1–4	2–1	0–1	3–1	5–0	1–1	0–0	3–0	2–2	4–1	4–1	2–0
Millwall	0–0	3–1	1–1	1–1	3–0	3–1	2–0	0–0	0–0	3–1	3–2	0–0		3–0	1–2	2–3	2–1	1–0	4–1	4–1	3–0	3–0	3–0	1–1
Newport County	2–1	2–1	0–3	4–3	2–2	0–1	4–4	3–2	1–0	1–2	1–3	0–1	1–3		4–1	1–1	2–0	1–0	4–2	0–1	3–0	3–0	3–2	1–1
Northampton Town	4–0	5–1	5–3	0–2	2–2	2–0	3–1	5–1	3–1	3–1	2–0	3–1	1–1	5–0		3–3	4–2	6–1	3–1	4–3	3–1	3–3	2–1	4–1
Norwich City	5–0	1–1	3–2	0–0	0–0	3–0	1–1	5–1	2–0	3–2	1–0	5–1	2–2	2–0	1–2		2–0	3–0	2–1	3–1	1–1	3–0	3–0	5–2
Queens Park Rangers	2–2	2–1	3–3	2–1	0–1	1–0	0–4	1–1	1–1	1–1	2–2	0–1	1–3	4–2	2–2	3–1		1–0	1–0	3–2	1–1	0–1	4–2	2–2
Reading	2–3	1–3	0–0	4–0	2–0	2–0	1–0	4–1	3–1	3–2	1–1	2–0	5–0	2–1	2–0	0–1	2–0		5–3	1–0	4–1	4–1	0–0	3–0
Shrewsbury Town	2–1	1–0	0–0	0–1	0–1	3–0	1–0	1–1	1–3	3–1	2–2	2–0	2–4	1–1	2–4	1–8	0–3	1–1		7–1	2–1	2–1	1–0	3–1
Southend	1–1	0–0	1–2	0–4	2–1	4–0	1–0	2–2	1–1	3–1	2–0	1–0	2–1	1–0	3–1	1–2	2–0	3–1	2–2		3–0	3–1	2–1	1–0
Swindon Town	3–2	1–2	3–0	0–0	1–3	0–1	2–3	3–6	5–2	0–0	2–0	1–1	1–2	2–0	3–0	2–1	1–3	2–0	2–2	1–3		2–0	1–2	0–0
Torquay United	1–2	5–1	1–2	1–2	1–0	5–1	2–1	1–1	5–2	3–2	4–1	5–0	1–0	3–3	3–0	4–1	1–1	2–0	4–0	4–2	3–1		0–3	2–2
Walsall	0–0	2–2	3–0	3–3	3–5	0–3	1–1	2–4	2–2	1–3	1–3	1–0	0–2	1–3	1–5	3–2	1–1	2–0	4–4	1–1	1–2	2–0		0–0
Watford	1–1	3–0	2–3	4–1	2–3	2–0	1–1	2–0	3–1	0–0	1–0	1–0	1–1	0–1	2–1	3–2	1–1	2–1	1–1	1–1	2–1	1–1	3–0	

Updated to match(es) played on unknown. Source: Ian Laschke: Rothmans Book of Football League Records 1888–89 to 1978–79. Macdonald and Jane’s, London & Sydney, 1980.
Legend: Blue = home team win; Yellow = draw; Red = away team win.

=== Maps ===
Locations of the Football League Third Division South London teams 1952–1953
Locations of the Football League Third Division South teams 1952–1953

== Attendances ==
=== Division One ===
No.	Club	Average
1	Arsenal FC	49,191
2	Newcastle United FC	44,521
3	Tottenham Hotspur FC	44,106
4	Chelsea FC	43,937
5	Sheffield Wednesday FC	42,634
6	Liverpool FC	39,971
7	Sunderland AFC	39,767
8	Cardiff City FC	37,933
9	Manchester United	37,571
10	Wolverhampton Wanderers FC	36,608
11	Manchester City FC	34,058
12	Aston Villa FC	32,189
13	Bolton Wanderers FC	32,066
14	Portsmouth FC	31,578
15	West Bromwich Albion FC	31,381
16	Preston North End FC	30,586
17	Burnley FC	28,480
18	Stoke City FC	27,883
19	Middlesbrough FC	27,077
20	Blackpool FC	25,835
21	Charlton Athletic FC	25,298
22	Derby County FC	21,627

=== Division Two ===
No.	Club	Average
1	Everton FC	32,629
2	Sheffield United FC	31,027
3	Huddersfield Town AFC	27,765
4	Leicester City FC	26,250
5	Hull City AFC	25,918
6	Plymouth Argyle FC	23,345
7	Blackburn Rovers FC	23,157
8	Fulham FC	23,134
9	Nottingham Forest FC	22,816
10	Swansea City AFC	20,469
11	Leeds United FC	20,432
12	West Ham United FC	19,797
13	Birmingham City FC	19,747
14	Notts County FC	19,391
15	Brentford FC	17,474
16	Luton Town FC	17,210
17	Lincoln City FC	16,775
18	Rotherham United FC	16,384
19	Southampton FC	16,159
20	Doncaster Rovers FC	15,862
21	Bury FC	13,420
22	Barnsley FC	11,358

=== Division Three ===
No.	Club	Average
1	Bristol Rovers FC	23,411
2	Norwich City FC	21,121
3	Millwall FC	19,289
4	Bristol City FC	18,763
5	Oldham Athletic FC	17,928
6	Brighton & Hove Albion FC	16,161
7	Port Vale FC	14,504
8	Grimsby Town FC	14,298
9	Watford FC	13,957
10	Coventry City FC	13,430
11	Northampton Town FC	12,484
12	Crystal Palace FC	12,415
13	Reading FC	12,401
14	Queens Park Rangers FC	12,190
15	Gillingham FC	11,558
16	Bradford City AFC	10,892
17	AFC Bournemouth	10,768
18	Leyton Orient FC	10,562
19	Exeter City FC	10,339
20	Wrexham AFC	10,306
21	Bradford Park Avenue AFC	9,945
22	Ipswich Town FC	9,434
23	Swindon Town FC	9,326
24	Chesterfield FC	9,216
25	Newport County AFC	8,868
26	Southend United FC	8,697
27	York City FC	8,654
28	Shrewsbury Town FC	8,540
29	Carlisle United FC	8,103
30	Hartlepool United FC	8,074
31	Halifax Town AFC	8,060
32	Colchester United FC	8,046
33	Stockport County FC	8,006
34	Tranmere Rovers	7,798
35	Mansfield Town FC	7,680
36	Scunthorpe United FC	7,407
37	Workington AFC	7,212
38	Torquay United FC	6,980
39	Crewe Alexandra FC	6,822
40	Aldershot Town FC	6,553
41	Rochdale AFC	6,182
42	Walsall FC	5,991
43	Darlington FC	5,847
44	Southport FC	5,761
45	Gateshead AFC	5,616
46	Accrington Stanley FC	5,549
47	Barrow AFC	5,450
48	Chester City FC	5,271

== See also ==
- 1952-53 in English football
