= Dick Wright (footballer, born 1931) =

English footballer

Personal information
- Full name: Richard Wright
- Date of birth: 5 December 1931
- Place of birth: Mexborough, England
- Date of death: 2003 (aged 71–72)
- Place of death: Chester, England
- Position: Goalkeeper

Senior career*
Years	Team	Apps	(Gls)
1952–1955	Chester	52	(0)
- * Club domestic league appearances and goals

Dick Wright (5 December 1931 – October 2003) was an English footballer, who played as a goalkeeper in the Football League for Chester.
