= 1952–53 in English football =

Football in England
- Season: 1952–53

Men's football
- First Division: Arsenal
- Second Division: Sheffield United
- FA Cup: Blackpool

The 1952–53 season was the 73rd season of competitive football in England.

== Overview ==
This was the closest championship win in English league history at the time; Arsenal claimed the title with a goal average superior to that of Preston North End by just 0.099. Both Arsenal and Preston had identical records aside from goal difference and goal average.

Had goal difference been the deciding factor – as it was from 1977 onwards – Arsenal would still have won with +33 to Preston's +25; in 1989, for comparison, Arsenal would have finished second (to Liverpool) on goal average. Preston had last been champions in 1890, the second season of the Football League.

The FA Cup was won by Blackpool, beating Bolton Wanderers 4–3 in what became known as the 'Matthews Final', due to the masterly contribution of 38-year-old winger Stanley Matthews, who helped his side win after going 3–1 down, although three of Blackpool's goals were scored by prolific forward Stan Mortensen.

== Honours ==
Competition	Winner	Runner-up
First Division	Arsenal (7*)	Preston North End
Second Division	Sheffield United	Huddersfield Town
Third Division North	Oldham Athletic	Port Vale
Third Division South	Bristol Rovers	Millwall
FA Cup	Blackpool (1)	Bolton Wanderers
Charity Shield	Manchester United	Newcastle United
Home Championship	Shared by England and Scotland	

Notes = Number in parentheses is the times that club has won that honour. * indicates new record for competition

== Football League ==
=== First Division ===
Pos	Team	Pld	W	D	L	GF	GA	GAv	Pts	Relegation
1	Arsenal (C)	42	21	12	9	97	64	1.516	54	
2	Preston North End	42	21	12	9	85	60	1.417	54	
3	Wolverhampton Wanderers	42	19	13	10	86	63	1.365	51	
4	West Bromwich Albion	42	21	8	13	66	60	1.100	50	
5	Charlton Athletic	42	19	11	12	77	63	1.222	49	
6	Burnley	42	18	12	12	67	52	1.288	48	
7	Blackpool	42	19	9	14	71	70	1.014	47	
8	Manchester United	42	18	10	14	69	72	0.958	46	
9	Sunderland	42	15	13	14	68	82	0.829	43	
10	Tottenham Hotspur	42	15	11	16	78	69	1.130	41	
11	Aston Villa	42	14	13	15	63	61	1.033	41	
12	Cardiff City	42	14	12	16	54	46	1.174	40	
13	Middlesbrough	42	14	11	17	70	77	0.909	39	
14	Bolton Wanderers	42	15	9	18	61	69	0.884	39	
15	Portsmouth	42	14	10	18	74	83	0.892	38	
16	Newcastle United	42	14	9	19	59	70	0.843	37	
17	Liverpool	42	14	8	20	61	82	0.744	36	
18	Sheffield Wednesday	42	12	11	19	62	72	0.861	35	
19	Chelsea	42	12	11	19	56	66	0.848	35	
20	Manchester City	42	14	7	21	72	87	0.828	35	
21	Stoke City (R)	42	12	10	20	53	66	0.803	34	Relegation to the Second Division
22	Derby County (R)	42	11	10	21	59	74	0.797	32	Relegation to the Second Division

Source: World Football
Rules for classification: 1) Points; 2) Goal average; 3) Goals scored
(C) Champions; (R) Relegated

=== Second Division ===
Pos	Team	Pld	W	D	L	GF	GA	GAv	Pts	Qualification or relegation
1	Sheffield United (C, P)	42	25	10	7	97	55	1.764	60	Promotion to the First Division
2	Huddersfield Town (P)	42	24	10	8	84	33	2.545	58	Promotion to the First Division
3	Luton Town	42	22	8	12	84	49	1.714	52	
4	Plymouth Argyle	42	20	9	13	65	60	1.083	49	
5	Leicester City	42	18	12	12	89	74	1.203	48	
6	Birmingham City	42	19	10	13	71	66	1.076	48	
7	Nottingham Forest	42	18	8	16	77	67	1.149	44	
8	Fulham	42	17	10	15	81	71	1.141	44	
9	Blackburn Rovers	42	18	8	16	68	65	1.046	44	
10	Leeds United	42	14	15	13	71	63	1.127	43	
11	Swansea Town	42	15	12	15	78	81	0.963	42	
12	Rotherham United	42	16	9	17	75	74	1.014	41	
13	Doncaster Rovers	42	12	16	14	58	64	0.906	40	
14	West Ham United	42	13	13	16	58	60	0.967	39	
15	Lincoln City	42	11	17	14	64	71	0.901	39	
16	Everton	42	12	14	16	71	75	0.947	38	
17	Brentford	42	13	11	18	59	76	0.776	37	
18	Hull City	42	14	8	20	57	69	0.826	36	
19	Notts County	42	14	8	20	60	88	0.682	36	
20	Bury	42	13	9	20	53	81	0.654	35	
21	Southampton (R)	42	10	13	19	68	85	0.800	33	Relegation to the Third Division South
22	Barnsley (R)	42	5	8	29	47	108	0.435	18	Relegation to the Third Division North

Rules for classification: 1) Points; 2) Goal average; 3) Goals scored
(C) Champions; (P) Promoted; (R) Relegated

=== Third Division North ===
Pos	Team	Pld	W	D	L	GF	GA	GAv	Pts	Promotion or relegation
1	Oldham Athletic (C, P)	46	22	15	9	77	45	1.711	59	Promotion to the Second Division
2	Port Vale	46	20	18	8	67	35	1.914	58	
3	Wrexham	46	24	8	14	86	66	1.303	56	
4	York City	46	20	13	13	60	45	1.333	53	
5	Grimsby Town	46	21	10	15	75	59	1.271	52	
6	Southport	46	20	11	15	63	60	1.050	51	
7	Bradford (Park Avenue)	46	19	12	15	75	61	1.230	50	
8	Gateshead	46	17	15	14	76	60	1.267	49	
9	Carlisle United	46	18	13	15	82	68	1.206	49	
10	Crewe Alexandra	46	20	8	18	70	68	1.029	48	
11	Stockport County	46	17	13	16	82	69	1.188	47	
12	Chesterfield	46	18	11	17	65	63	1.032	47	
13	Tranmere Rovers	46	21	5	20	65	63	1.032	47	
14	Halifax Town	46	16	15	15	68	68	1.000	47	
15	Scunthorpe & Lindsey United	46	16	14	16	62	56	1.107	46	
16	Bradford City	46	14	18	14	75	80	0.938	46	
17	Hartlepools United	46	16	14	16	57	61	0.934	46	
18	Mansfield Town	46	16	14	16	55	62	0.887	46	
19	Barrow	46	16	12	18	66	71	0.930	44	
20	Chester	46	11	15	20	64	85	0.753	37	
21	Darlington	46	14	6	26	58	96	0.604	34	
22	Rochdale	46	14	5	27	62	83	0.747	33	
23	Workington	46	11	10	25	55	91	0.604	32	Re-elected
24	Accrington Stanley	46	8	11	27	39	89	0.438	27	Re-elected

Source: rsssf.com
(C) Division Champions; (P) Promoted

=== Third Division South ===
Pos	Team	Pld	W	D	L	GF	GA	GAv	Pts	Qualification or relegation
1	Bristol Rovers (C, P)	46	26	12	8	92	46	2.000	64	Promotion to the Second Division
2	Millwall	46	24	14	8	82	44	1.864	62	
3	Northampton Town	46	26	10	10	109	70	1.557	62	
4	Norwich City	46	25	10	11	99	55	1.800	60	
5	Bristol City	46	22	15	9	95	61	1.557	59	
6	Coventry City	46	19	12	15	77	62	1.242	50	
7	Brighton & Hove Albion	46	19	12	15	81	75	1.080	50	
8	Southend United	46	18	13	15	69	74	0.932	49	
9	Bournemouth & Boscombe Athletic	46	19	9	18	74	69	1.072	47	
10	Watford	46	15	17	14	62	63	0.984	47	
11	Reading	46	19	8	19	69	64	1.078	46	
12	Torquay United	46	18	9	19	87	88	0.989	45	
13	Crystal Palace	46	15	13	18	66	82	0.805	43	
14	Leyton Orient	46	16	10	20	68	73	0.932	42	
15	Newport County	46	16	10	20	70	82	0.854	42	
16	Ipswich Town	46	13	15	18	60	69	0.870	41	
17	Exeter City	46	13	14	19	61	71	0.859	40	
18	Swindon Town	46	14	12	20	64	79	0.810	40	
19	Aldershot	46	12	15	19	61	77	0.792	39	
20	Queens Park Rangers	46	12	15	19	61	82	0.744	39	
21	Gillingham	46	12	15	19	55	74	0.743	39	
22	Colchester United	46	12	14	20	59	76	0.776	38	
23	Shrewsbury Town	46	12	12	22	68	91	0.747	36	Re-elected
24	Walsall	46	7	10	29	56	118	0.475	24	Re-elected

(C) Champions; (P) Promoted

=== Top goalscorers ===
First Division

- Charlie Wayman (Preston North End) – 23 goals

Second Division

- Arthur Rowley (Leicester City) – 39 goals

Third Division North

- Jimmy Whitehouse (Carlisle United) – 29 goals

Third Division South

- Geoff Bradford (Bristol Rovers) – 33 goals

== National team ==
The England national football team were joint winners in the 1953 British Home Championship with Scotland. In the May following the conclusion of the season the England team embarked on their first tour of the Americas, following the experience in Brazil of the 1950 FIFA World Cup.

=== American tour ===
17 May 1953

Argentina	0–0	England

Estadio Monumental Antonio Vespucio Liberti, Buenos Aires

Abandoned after 21 minutes due to torrential rain

24 May 1953

Chile	1–2	England
Guillermo Diaz		Tommy Taylor, Nat Lofthouse

Estadio Nacional de Chile, Santiago

31 May 1953

Uruguay	2–1	England
Oscar Míguez, Julio Abbadie		Tommy Taylor

Centenario Stadium, Montevideo

13 June 1953

United States	3–6	England
Otto Decker, George Atheneos		Nat Lofthouse, Tom Finney, Redfern Froggatt, Ivor Broadis

Yankee Stadium, New York City
