= Tony Spink =

English footballer

Anthony Arthur Spink (16 November 1929 – 7 February 2011) was an English footballer who played as a centre forward. He was born in Doncaster and played professionally for Sheffield Wednesday, Chester, Workington, Sunderland and Tranmere Rovers between 1949 and 1957, making a total of 20 Football League appearances.

After retiring from football, Spink became the proprietor of an estate agency in East Sussex.
