= List of Swansea City A.F.C. players =

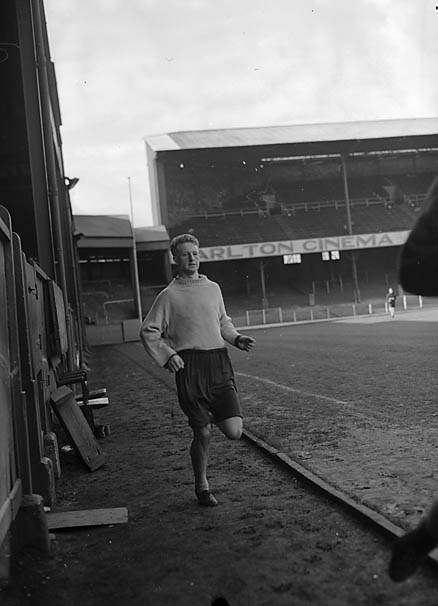
Ivor Allchurch scored 162 goals for the Swans between 1947–1958 and 1965–1968

Swansea City Association Football Club, a Welsh association football club based in the city of Swansea, was founded in 1912 under the name of Swansea Town and joined the Second Division of the Southern Football League. Following the First World War, the Southern League dropped its Second Division, and with many clubs droppin out due to financial difficulties, Swansea were placed in the First Division. After four seasons in the Southern League, Swansea Town became founder members of the new Third Division of the Football League in 1920. During the club's 106-year existence, it has competed in a number of nationally and internationally organised competitions, and all players who have played in 100 or more such matches are listed below.

Roger Freestone holds the club record for most appearances in all competitions, having played 676 times in all competitions during two different spells spanning from 1989 to 2004. Wilfred Milne holds the record for the most league appearances, having made 583 appearances in his time at Swansea from 1920 to 1937. Ashley Williams holds the record for the number of international caps attained whilst playing for Swansea City. He represented Wales 64 times before he transferred to Everton in 2016.

The all-time goalscoring record is held by Ivor Allchurch. He scored 163 league goals, and 188 goals in all competitions during his two spells at Swansea. The nearest player that comes close to his tally, is Robbie James who scored 117 league goals in a Swansea career that began in 1972 and ended in 1990.

== Key ==
- The list is ordered first by number of appearances in total, then by number of League appearances, and then if necessary by date of debut.
- Appearances as a substitute are included.
- Statistics are correct up to and including the match played on 31 March 2018. Where a player left the club permanently after this date, his statistics are updated to his date of leaving.

Legend	Meaning
♦	Player currently plays for Swansea City
♠	Player inducted into the "Robbie James Wall of Fame"
‡	Player has represented their country at the FIFA World Cup whilst playing for the club

Name
Full name of the player.

Positions
GK	Goalkeeper		
FB	Full back	DF	Defender
HB	Half back	MF	Midfielder
IF	Inside forward	FW	Forward
OF	Outside forward	FW	Forward
CF	Centre forward	FW	Forward

Position
Playing positions are listed according to the tactical formations that were employed at the time. Thus, the change in the names of defensive and midfield positions reflects the tactical evolution that occurred from the 1960s onwards.
Club career
Club career is defined as the first and last calendar years in which the player appeared for the club in any of the competitions listed below.
Total appearances and Total goals
Total appearances and goals comprise those in the Football League (including play-offs), Premier League, FA Cup, Football League Cup, Football League Trophy, UEFA Cup Winners' Cup and the Europa League. Appearances and goals in the Welsh Cup and FAW Premier Cup are excluded. Matches in wartime competitions are also excluded.
League appearances and League goals
League appearances and goals comprise those in the Football League and the Premier League. Due to the onset of the Second World War, appearances and goals from the first three games of the 1939–40 Football League season are excluded.
International selection
Countries are listed only for players who have been selected for international football at senior level.
Caps
For players having played at full international level, the caps column counts the number of such appearances during his career with the club.

== Players with 100 or more appearances ==
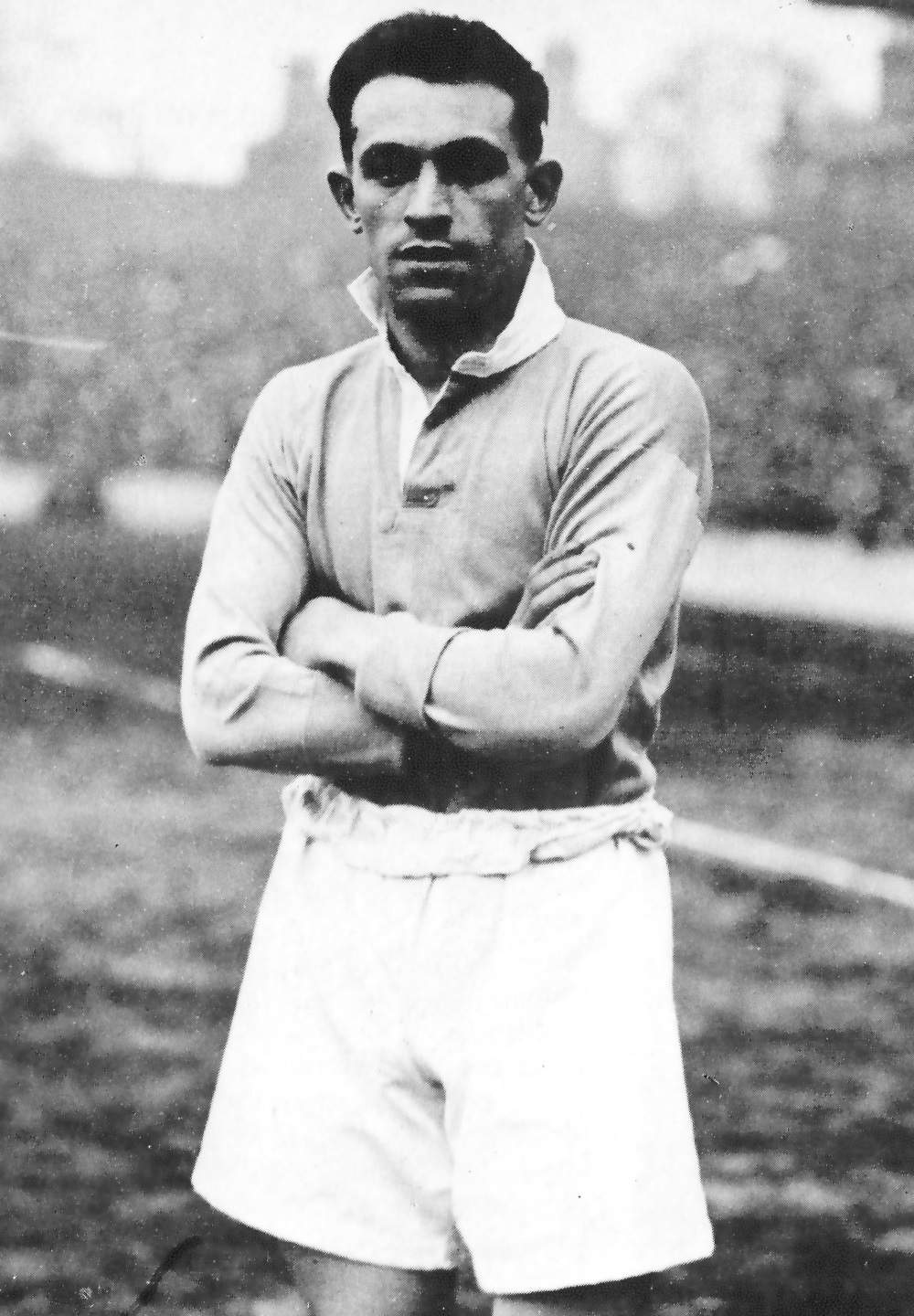
A one-club man, Wilfred Milne holds the club record for most appearances in the Football League. He appeared in 583 league games between 1920 and 1937

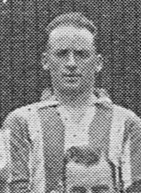
Bert Bellamy made 100 appearances in total for Swansea, and was part of the side that won the 1924–25 Third Division South

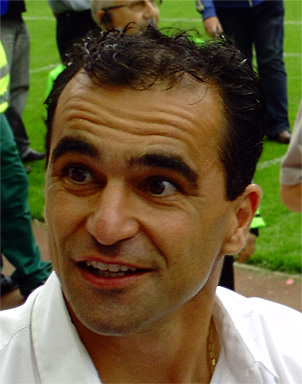
Roberto Martínez joined Swansea in 2003, and helped save the club from dropping out of the Football League. Martínez eventually became the club's manager and won the 2007–08 Football League One title

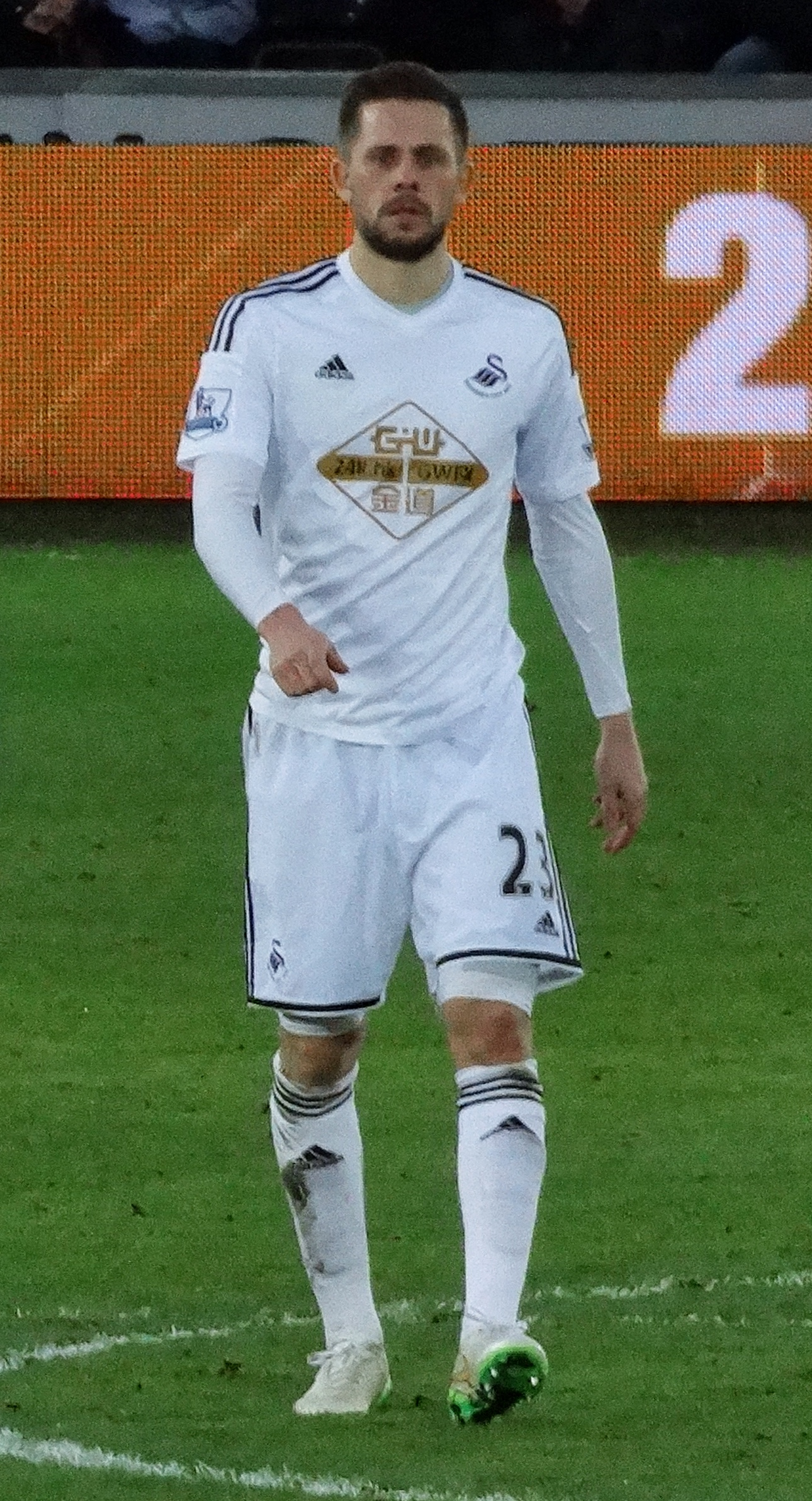
Gylfi Sigurðsson scored 34 league goals for Swansea during his two spells at the club. This is club record for the most goals scored by a single player in the top flight of English football. He also holds the record for being Swansea's most expensive sale when he joined Everton for a fee believed to be £45 million

List of Swansea City A.F.C. players with 100 or more appearances in all competitions.
Name	Position	Club career	Total apps	Total goals	League apps	League goals	International selection	Caps	Ref.	Notes
Roger Freestone ♠	GK	1989–1990; 1991–2004	676	3	567	3	Wales	1		(Note: Chelsea.)^{[P]}
Wilfred Milne ♠	FB	1920–1937	651	7	583	7	—	—		
Herbie Williams ♠	FW	1958–1975	612	128	512	104	Wales	3		
Robbie James ♠	MF	1972–1983; 1987–1990	592	150	484	117	Wales	19		
Leon Britton ♠	MF	2002–2010; 2011–2018	520	17	453	12	—	—		
Ivor Allchurch ♠	FW	1947–1958; 1965–1968	502	188	444	162	Wales ‡	42		
Harry Griffiths ♠	MF	1949–1964	479	81	424	70	Wales	1		
Wyndham Evans ♠	DF	1971–1983; 1984–1985	446	20	388	19	—	—		
Alan Curtis ♠	FW	1972–1979; 1980–1983; 1989–1990	439	121	364	95	Wales	25		
Brian Evans ♠	MF	1963–1973	436	76	356	56	Wales	6		
Geoff Thomas ♠	MF	1965–1976	418	70	359	53	—	—		
Billy Hole ♠	FW	1919–1931	409	46	363	42	Wales	9		
John King ♠	GK	1950–1964	407	0	368	0	Wales	1		
Len Allchurch ♠	MF	1950–1961; 1969–1971	400	70	347	60	Wales ‡	7		
Àngel Rangel ♠	DF	2007–2018	374	10	328	9	—	—		
Harry Deacon ♠	FW	1922–1931	362	99	322	90	—	—		
Jimmy Collins ♠	HB	1919–1930	352	8	309	8	—	—		
Ashley Williams ♠	DF	2008–2016	352	14	322	14	Wales	64		(Note: Stockport County.)^{[P]}
Sid Lawrence ♠	FB	1930–1939	346	11	311	11	Wales	8		
Joe Sykes ♠	HB	1924–1935	344	8	313	8	—	—		
Alan Tate ♠	DF	2002–2015	340	5	293	5	—	—		(Note: Manchester United.)^{[P]}
Nathan Dyer ♦	MF	2009–	335	37	288	25	—	—		
Kristian O'Leary ♠	MF	1995–2010	334	11	284	10	—	—		
Nigel Stevenson ♠	DF	1975–1987	330	20	259	15	Wales	4		
Dai Thomas ♠	FB	1949–1960	325	18	298	16	Wales	2		
Colin Pascoe ♠	MF	1983–1988; 1992–1996	324	65	270	54	Wales	2		(Note: Sunderland.)^{[P]}
Keith Walker ♠	MF	1989–2000	316	10	267	9	—	—		
Jeremy Charles ♠	FW	1976–1983	314	74	248	52	Wales	14		
Mel Nurse ♠	DF	1955–1962; 1967–1971	308	16	257	12	Wales	9		
Alex Ferguson ♠	GK	1926–1936	303	0	280	0	—	—		
Dudley Lewis ♠	DF	1980–1989	302	2	230	2	Wales	1		
Jonathan Coates ♠	FW	1993–2002; 2003–2004	296	18	261	16	—	—		
David Hough	DF	1983–1992	295	13	227	9	—	—		
Mark Harris ♠	DF	1989–1995	288	18	228	14	—	—		
Reg Weston ♠	FB	1945–1958	286	1	264	1	—	—		
Brian Hughes ♠	DF	1958–1967; 1968–1969	280	8	233	6	—	—		
Garry Monk ♠	DF	2004–2014	270	7	223	3	—	—		
Mel Charles ♠	FW	1952–1959	264	76	233	69	Wales ‡	21		
Dave Gwyther ♠	FW	1965–1973	264	82	217	58	—	—		
Roy Evans ♠	DF	1962–1968	261	8	215	7	Wales	1		
Michael Howard	DF	1998–2004	261	2	231	2	—	—		
Wayne Routledge ♦	MF	2011–	260	27	222	21	—	—		
Keith Todd ♠	FW	1960–1968	245	96	199	76	—	—		
Joe Lloyd	HB	1932–1939	236	2	213	1	—	—		
Danny Bartley ♠	DF	1973–1980	234	9	199	8	—	—		
Frank Burns ♠	HB	1945–1952	230	18	210	14	—	—		
Paul Raynor	MF	1987–1992	228	34	191	27	—	—		
Steve Watkin	FW	1997–2003	227	48	207	44	—	—		
Andy Robinson ♠	MF	2003–2008	226	54	195	44	—	—		
Tommy Hutchison ♠	MF	1985–1991	224	13	178	9	Scotland	0		
Nick Cusack ♠	MF	1997–2002	224	17	202	13	—	—		
Lachlan McPherson ♠	HB	1924–1930	223	32	199	30	—	—		
Harry Hanford ♠	DF	1927–1936	223	10	200	0	Wales	4		
Vic Gomersall ♠	DF	1966–1971	221	7	179	7	—	—		
Jock Denoon	GK	1919–1927	220	0	188	0	—	—		
Dave Bruton ♠	DF	1973–1978	219	21	191	18	—	—		
Billy Lucas ♠	FW	1948–1953	217	36	199	34	Wales	7		
Leonard Thompson ♠	FW	1922–1928	216	104	188	84	—	—		
Steve Jenkins ♠	DF	1990–1995	215	1	165	1	Wales	1		
Andy Melville ♠	DF	1986–1990	213	29	175	22	Wales	4		
Tommy Olsen ♠	FW	1931–1939	208	52	195	50	—	—		
Tony Millington ♠	GK	1969–1974	208	0	178	0	Wales	8		
Chris Marustik	MF	1978–1985	208	14	152	11	Wales	6		
Andy Legg	MF	1988–1993	207	38	163	29	Wales	0		
Jon Ford	DF	1991–1995	206	9	160	7	—	—		
Mike Johnson ♠	DF	1959–1966	204	2	166	1	Wales	1		
Steve Torpey ♠	FW	1993–1997	204	57	161	44	—	—		
Matthew Bound	DF	1997–2002	203	14	178	11	—	—		
Dorus de Vries ♠	GK	2007–2011	203	0	178	0	—	—		
Brian Purcell ♠	DF	1959–1968	201	1	162	1	—	—		
Joe Spottiswood	FW	1919–1925	200	13	174	12	—	—		
Barrie Jones ♠	FW	1959–1964	199	33	166	23	Wales	7		
Darren Pratley	MF	2006–2011	199	31	177	26	—	—		
Kyle Naughton ♦	DF	2015–	198	5	183	5	—	—		
Ronnie Williams ♠	FW	1929–1934; 1936–1938	197	61	176	51	Wales	0		
Chris Coleman ♠	DF	1987–1991	196	3	160	2	Wales	0		
Lee Trundle ♠	FW	2003–2007; 2009–2010	194	91	166	83	—	—		(Note: Bristol City.)^{[P]}
John Cornforth ♠	MF	1991–1996	193	18	149	16	Wales	2		
Cliff Jones ♠	FW	1952–1958	192	54	167	48	Wales ‡	19		
Jim McLaughlin ♠	MF	1963–1967; 1972–1974	191	69	151	47	Northern Ireland	7		
Jack Fowler ♠	FW	1923–1930	189	120	167	102	Wales	6		
Pat Lally	DF	1973–1978	188	12	160	10	—	—		
Rory Keane	FB	1947–1955	184	0	164	0	Ireland; Republic of Ireland	1; 4		
Colin Webster ♠	FW	1958–1963	182	72	160	65	Wales	0		
Frank Scrine ♠	FW	1945–1954	181	76	162	55	Wales	2		
Lee Jenkins	MF	1996–2003	181	4	165	4	—	—		
Mike Hughes ♠	GK	1983–1988	180	0	139	0	—	—		
Neil Taylor	DF	2010–2017	179	0	160	0	Wales; Great Britain	37; 5		
Kwame Ampadu	MF	1994–1998	178	15	146	12	—	—		
Billy Screen	MF	1967–1972	177	17	145	14	—	—		
Alan Williams ♠	DF	1968–1972	177	8	143	7	—	—		
Roy Paul ♠	HB	1946–1950	176	13	160	13	Wales	9		
Brayley Reynolds ♠	FW	1959–1965	176	77	151	57	—	—		
Alan Davies	MF	1987–1989; 1990–1992	175	16	127	12	Wales	3		
Glen Davies	DF	1970–1976	174	14	150	13	—	—		
Dai Nicholas	FW	1930–1939	170	16	153	13	Wales	2		
Billy Humphries	FW	1965–1968	169	27	143	21	Northern Ireland	3		
Gilbert Beech	FB	1949–1958	167	4	156	2	—	—		
Jason Bowen	FW	1990–1995	167	39	123	26	Wales	1		
Jason Smith	DF	1998–2004	167	10	142	8	—	—		
Noel Dwyer ♠	GK	1960–1964	166	0	140	0	Republic of Ireland	10		
Steve Jones	DF	1995–2001	165	4	145	4	—	—		
Terry Medwin ♠	FW	1951–1956	164	69	147	60	Wales ‡	3		
Alan Waddle ♠	FW	1978–1980; 1985–1986	162	53	130	43	—	—		
Ki Sung-yueng	MF	2012–2018	162	12	139	12	South Korea ‡	117		
Dave Penney	MF	1991; 1994–1997	159	27	131	23	—	—		(Note: Oxford United.)^{[P]}
Tony Screen	DF	1968–1975	155	11	127	9	—	—		
Steve Thornber	MF	1988–1992	155	11	117	7	—	—		
Willy Guéret	GK	2004–2007	155	0	132	0	—	—		
Jim Miller	HB	1930–1934	154	4	137	2	—	—		
Peter Davies	DF	1959–1965	153	4	133	4	—	—		
Neil Robinson	MF	1979–1985	153	8	123	7	—	—		
Kevin Austin	DF	2004–2008	150	0	117	0	Trinidad and Tobago	0		
Joe Allen	MF	2007–2012	150	7	127	7	Wales; Great Britain	8; 5		
Łukasz Fabiański	GK	2014–2018	150	0	149	0	Poland	50		
Tom Kiley ♠	HB	1949–1957	149	4	132	2	—	—		
Chris Harrison	DF	1985–1988	149	17	117	14	—	—		
Cyril Beech ♠	FW	1949–1954	148	34	137	29	—	—		
John Hodge	FW	1993–1996	145	13	112	10	—	—		
Mark Gower	MF	2008–2013	145	3	128	3	—	—		
Jack Warner	HB	1933–1938	144	9	134	9	Wales	0		
Carl Slee	DF	1967–1971	144	0	117	0	—	—		
Thomas Butler	MF	2006–2012	144	11	126	9	Republic of Ireland	0		
Darwell Williams	HB	1950–1954	143	6	130	4	—	—		
Mark Clode	DF	1993–1999	143	3	119	3	—	—		
Willie Davies	FW	1921–1924; 1933–1936	142	25	128	22	Wales	3		
John Mahoney ♠	MF	1979–1983	142	1	110	0	Wales	7		
Richard Appleby	MF	1996–2001	141	14	120	11	—	—		
Shaun Chapple	MF	1991–1997	140	13	107	9	—	—		
Gary Emmanuel	MF	1985–1988	139	7	111	5	—	—		
Roberto Martínez ♠	MF	2003–2006	139	4	122	4	—	—		
Bryn Jones	FB	1952–1958	138	4	122	3	—	—		
Lee Bracey	GK	1988–1991	138	0	99	0	—	—		
Christian Edwards	DF	1994–1998; 2005	137	4	117	4	Wales	1		(Note: Bristol Rovers.)
Izzy Iriekpen	DF	2003–2007	137	8	123	7	—	—		
Steve Potter	GK	1974–1978	136	0	118	0	—	—		
Jay Fulton ♦	MF	2014–	136	9	124	8	—	—		
Stan Moore	GK	1935–1939	135	0	123	0	—	—		
Fred Robson	FB	1919–1922	133	0	117	0	—	—		
Ernie Morley	FB	1920–1928	133	0	123	0	Wales	1		
Russell Coughlin	MF	1990–1993	132	3	101	2	—	—		
André Ayew ♦	FW	2015–2016; 2017–2018; 2019–	131	44	126	41	Ghana	92		
Gylfi Sigurðsson	MF	2012; 2014–2017	131	37	124	34	Iceland	29		(Note: TSG 1899 Hoffenheim.)^{[P]}
Jackie O'Driscoll	FW	1947–1952	129	30	117	27	Ireland; Republic of Ireland	3; 3		
John Williams	FW	1991–1992; 1995; 2001–2003	129	20	114	18	—	—		(Note: Coventry City.)
Tudor Martin	FW	1932–1936	128	54	117	46	Wales	0		
Leighton James ♠	MF	1980–1983	127	33	98	28	Wales	16		
Federico Fernández	DF	2014–2018	127	2	118	2	Argentina	32		
Reg Davies	FW	1958–1962	125	34	109	30	Wales	0		
Matt Grimes ♦	MF	2014–	124	4	114	2	—	—		
Stuart Roberts	MF	1998–2001; 2004	124	15	104	15	—	—		
Dai Lewis	FW	1930–1936	123	8	110	5	Wales	2		
George Heyes	GK	1965–1969	122	0	99	0	—	—		
Leighton Phillips ♠	DF	1978–1981	120	1	97	1	Wales	18		
Bob Latchford ♠	FW	1981–1984	120	53	87	35	England	0		
Dai Lawrence	DF	1967–1971	119	2	98	2	—	—		
Damien Lacey	MF	1995–2003	118	3	104	2	—	—		
Sean McCarthy	FW	1985–1988	118	40	91	25	—	—		
Reuben Simons	HB	1931–1939	116	1	104	0	—	—		
Alan Knill	DF	1987–1989	114	4	89	3	Wales	1		
Jack Firth	FW	1933–1936	113	18	102	16	—	—		
Džemal Hadžiabdić ♠	DF	1980–1983	113	2	89	1	Yugoslavia	0		
Roy Saunders	MF	1959–1963	112	5	98	3	—	—		
Sammy McCrory	FW	1946–1950	111	52	102	46	Northern Ireland	0		
Allan Sanders	DF	1959–1962	111	0	91	0	—	—		
Ben Williams	FB	1925–1930	110	0	103	0	Wales	4		
Brian Attley	MF	1979–1982	109	9	89	6	—	—		
Julian Alsop ♠	FW	1998–2000	108	17	90	16	—	—		
Martin Thomas	MF	1998–2001	108	11	91	8	—	—		
William Brown	FW	1919–1922	106	30	93	26	—	—		
Jack Parry	GK	1945–1951	106	0	97	0	Wales	1		
Ante Rajković ♠	DF	1981–1983; 1983–1985	106	3	81	2	Yugoslavia	0		
Ken Gunn	HB	1927–1933	105	36	94	34	—	—		
Arthur Willis	FB	1954–1958	105	0	95	0	England	0		
Eddie May	DF	1976–1978	105	10	90	8	—	—		
Sam Ricketts	DF	2004–2006	105	3	89	1	Wales	10		
Jason Scotland ♠	FW	2007–2009	105	53	90	45	Trinidad and Tobago	11		
Charlie Fisher	FB	1945–1948	104	0	98	0	—	—		
Graham Williams	FW	1958–1962	103	20	89	9	Wales	5		
Dai Davies ♠	GK	1969–1970; 1974; 1981–1983	103	0	78	0	Wales	8		
Sandy Langford	FB	1923–1927	102	1	78	0	—	—		
Micky Evans	DF	1972–1975	102	7	92	7	—	—		
Jimmy Rimmer ♠	GK	1973; 1983–1986	102	0	83	0	England	0		
Tony Bird	FW	1997–2000	102	22	86	18	—	—		
George Smith	MF	1975–1977	101	8	88	8	—	—		
Bert Bellamy	FB	1923–1926	100	1	90	1	—	—		
Dilwyn John	GK	1967–1970	100	0	80	0	—	—		

== Footnotes ==
Player statistics include games played while on loan from:

^{P} Player moved to Swansea permanently following a loan spell.
