= James Collins =

James, Jim, Jimmy, or Jamie Collins may refer to:

== Sports ==
=== Association football ===
- Jimmy Collins (footballer, born 1872) (1872–1900), Scottish footballer
- Jimmy Collins (footballer, born 1895), Scottish footballer
- Jimmy Collins (footballer, born 1903) (1903–1977), English footballer who played for West Ham United
- Jimmy Collins (footballer, born 1911) (1911–1983), English footballer
- Jimmy Collins (footballer, born 1923), Irish goalkeeper during the 1940s and 1950s
- Jimmy Collins (footballer, born 1937) (1937–2018), Scottish footballer
- Jimmy Collins (footballer, born 1966), English footballer, see List of Bury F.C. players (1–24 appearances)
- Jamie Collins (footballer, born 1978), English footballer (Crewe Alexandra)
- James Collins (footballer, born 1983), Welsh international footballer (Cardiff City, Aston Villa, West Ham United, Ipswich Town)
- Jamie Collins (footballer, born 1984), English footballer (Eastleigh)
- James Collins (footballer, born 1990), Irish footballer (Shrewsbury Town, Swindon Town, Hibernian, Crawley Town, Luton Town)
- Jim Collins (footballer, born 1923) (1923–1996), footballer for Barrow and Chester City

=== Other football ===
- James Collins (rugby union) (born 1986), English rugby union player, currently playing for Worcester Warriors
- Jim Collins (American football coach) (born 1966), American college football coach and former player
- Jim Collins (Australian footballer) (1896–1990), Australian rules football
- Jim Collins (linebacker) (born 1958), American football linebacker and NFL Pro Bowler
- Jimmy Collins (American football) (born c. 1986), American junior college football coach and former player

=== Baseball ===
- Jimmy Collins (1870–1943), American baseball player
- Ripper Collins (baseball) (James Anthony Collins, 1904–1970), baseball player

=== Basketball ===
- James Collins (basketball) (born 1973), NBA basketball player
- Jimmy Collins (basketball) (1946–2020), American basketball player and coach

=== Hockey ===
- Jim Collins (ice hockey) (born 1951), Canadian ice hockey player
- James Collins (field hockey) (born 2000), Australian field hockey player

=== Other sports ===
- Jim Collins (curler) (1921–1982), Canadian curler
- James Collins (nutritionist), sports nutritionist and author

== Government and military ==
- James Collins (public servant) (1869–1934), Australian Secretary of the Department of the Treasury
- James Lawton Collins (1882–1963), U.S. Army general
- James Collins (Irish politician) (1900–1967), Irish politician and father of Gerard Collins
- James Francis Collins (1905–1989), U.S. Army general
- James M. Collins (1916–1989), U.S. Representative for the 3rd congressional district of Texas
- James Lawton Collins Jr. (1917–2002), U.S. Army general, military historian, and viticulturist
- James Franklin Collins (born 1939), U.S. diplomat and ambassador to Russia
- James Collins (Wisconsin and California politician) (1802–1864)

== Science and commerce ==
- James L. Collins (1883–1953), Texas oil man and community philanthropist
- James T. Collins (born 1946), American linguist
- James E. Collins (born 1953), American veterinary physician
- James C. Collins (born 1958), American business consultant
- James Collins (bioengineer) (born 1965), American bioengineering professor
- James "Jim" Collins, CEO of Corteva

== Other people ==
- Jim Collins (singer) (born 1959), American country music singer-songwriter
- James Collins (priest) (1801–1868), Anglican priest in Ireland
- James Daniel Collins (1917–1985), American philosopher
- Jim Collins (1882–1942), magician's assistant of Harry Houdini

== See also ==
- Jamie Collins (disambiguation)
