= 2014 Queen's Birthday Honours (Australia) =

The Queen's Birthday Honours 2014 were announced on 9 June 2014 by the Governor-General of Australia, Sir Peter Cosgrove.

The Birthday Honours were appointments by some of the 16 Commonwealth realms of Queen Elizabeth II to various orders and honours to reward and highlight good works by citizens of those countries. The Birthday Honours are awarded as part of the Queen's Official Birthday celebrations during the month of June. The 2014 Birthday Honours were announced on 14 June 2014 in the United Kingdom, on 9 June 2014 in Australia, on 2 June 2014 in New Zealand, and on 14 June 2014 in Grenada, Papua New Guinea, Solomon Islands, Tuvalu, Saint Lucia and Belize.

† indicates an award given posthumously.

== Order of Australia ==
General division ribbon

Military division ribbon

=== Dame (AD) ===
- Her Excellency Professor The Honourable Marie Roslyn Bashir, AC, CVO – For extraordinary and pre-eminent achievement and merit in service to the administration, public life, and people of New South Wales, to medicine, particularly as an advocate for improved mental health outcomes for the young, marginalised and disadvantaged, to international relations, through the promotion of collaborative health programs, and as a leader in tertiary education.

=== Companion (AC) ===
==== General Division ====
- The Honourable Justice Thomas Frederick Bathurst – For eminent service to the judiciary and to the law, to the development of the legal profession, particularly through the implementation of uniform national rules of conduct, and to the community of New South Wales.
- Leslie Allen Carlyon – For eminent service to literature through the promotion of the national identity as an author, editor and journalist, to the understanding and appreciation of Australia's war history, and to the horseracing industry.
- Doctor Megan Elizabeth Clark – For eminent service to scientific research and development through fostering innovation, to science administration through strategic leadership roles, and to the development of public policy for technological sciences.
- The Honourable Ewan Charles Crawford – For eminent service to the judiciary and to the law, to the development of the legal profession, to tertiary education, and to the community of Tasmania.
- Professor Sir Marc Feldmann, FAA, FRS, FRCP, FRCPath, FMedSci – For eminent service to medicine and to public health as an acclaimed researcher in the field of chronic immune disease, and through the development of innovative treatment therapies.
- Professor Richard Alexander Gibbs, Houston, Texas, United States of America – For eminent service to science and academic medicine as a leading researcher, author and scholar, particularly in the field of genetics and human genome sequencing, and as a mentor of emerging scientists.
- The Honourable Doctor Barry Owen Jones, AO, FAA, FACE, FAHA, FASSA, FTSE – For eminent service to the community as a leading intellectual in Australian public life, through contributions to scientific, heritage, musical, medical, political and public health organisations, and to the Australian Parliament.

=== Officer (AO) ===
==== General Division ====
- Doctor Ian Allison, AAM – For distinguished service to the environment as a glaciologist, to furthering international understanding of the science of the Antarctic region, and to climate research.
- Betty Amsden, OAM – For distinguished service to the community through philanthropic contributions and support for the arts, including the development of public education and participation programs, particularly for children
- Patricia Audrey Anderson – For distinguished service to the Indigenous community as a social justice advocate, particularly through promoting improved health, educational and protection outcomes for children.
- Susan Joan Ash – For distinguished service to the community, particularly in the area of social policy development, reform and implementation, and to the provision of services to people in need.
- Professor Desmond John Ball – For distinguished service to international relations as an academic, author and researcher, to Australian Defence policy formulation, and to the security architecture of the Asia-Pacific region.
- Professor Peter Charles Blumbergs – For distinguished service to medicine in the field of neuropathology as an academic, researcher and author, through landmark contributions to the understanding of traumatic brain injury.
- Lesley J Boston – For distinguished service to education as an advocate for improved opportunities for young women, to innovative and best practice pedagogy, and to professional development.
- Professor Warwick John Britton – For distinguished service to medical research as an academic and immunologist, to humanitarian and public health improvements for the people of Nepal, and to the community.
- Doctor Rosemary Barrington Bryant – For distinguished service to the profession of nursing through national and international leadership, and as a supporter of access and equity in health care.
- Deborah Joy Cheetham – For distinguished service to the performing arts as an opera singer, composer and artistic director, to the development of Indigenous artists, and to innovation in performance.
- Frank Charles Cooper – For distinguished service to the community through leadership and financial management roles with cultural, medical research, sporting, child health, and educational organisations.
- Professor Edwina Cecily Cornish – For distinguished service to higher education, to advances in biotechnology and horticultural genetic modification, and through fostering of partnerships with government, industry and the community.
- The Honourable Doctor Hendy John Cowan – For distinguished service to the Parliament of Western Australia, to tertiary education, agriculture and regional development, and through significant contributions to cancer control organisations.
- Maryanne Diamond – For distinguished service to people who are blind or have low vision through national and international leadership roles, and as an advocate for best practice employment opportunities.
- Professor Peter Bishop Dixon – For distinguished service to education in the field of applied economics as an academic, researcher and author, through significant contributions to policy analysis and modelling.
- Professor Jeffrey Charles Dunn – For distinguished service to medical administration through leadership roles with cancer control organisations, and to the promotion of innovative and integrated cancer care programs.
- Judith Durham, OAM – For distinguished service to the performing arts as an entertainer, through seminal contributions to Australian music, and as a supporter of a range of not-for-profit organisations.
- Doctor Alan Simon Finkel, AM – For distinguished service to science and engineering, and to tertiary education administration, as an advocate for the protection of children, and to philanthropy.
- Professor Paul Atherstone Grabowsky – For distinguished service to music as a performer, composer, educator and mentor, and through significant contributions to the arts as an administrator.
- Doctor Gwendolyn Gray Jamieson – For distinguished service to the community, particularly through better women's health outcomes, advocacy, and the development of public policy.
- Professor Thomas Rhys Griffiths – For distinguished service to tertiary education, particularly social, cultural and environmental history, and through popular and academic contributions to Australian literature.
- Athol George Guy – For distinguished service to the performing arts as an entertainer, through seminal contributions to Australian music, and as a supporter of a range of not-for-profit organisations.
- Professor Nicholas Johannes Hoogenraad – For distinguished service to science education and technological development, particularly in the fields of biochemistry and molecular biology.
- Professor Heather Elizabeth Jeffery – For distinguished service to medicine and tertiary education in the field of paediatrics, and to improved maternal and child health in rural and remote Australia and in developing countries.
- Henry Alfred Jenkins – For distinguished service to the Parliament of Australia, particularly as a presiding officer and through a range of outreach and inter-Parliamentary programs.
- Professor Graeme John Koehne – For distinguished service to the performing arts as a composer of chamber, concert and ballet music, and through substantial contributions as an educator and arts administrator.
- Emeritus Professor Philip Spencer Lake – For distinguished service to conservation and the environment as an ecologist and freshwater scientist, and to research and professional organisations.
- Robert Burgess Leece, AM, RFD – For distinguished service to the community of New South Wales through the development and guidance of major infrastructure projects.
- Conjoint Professor Gregory Ross Leigh – For distinguished service to the deaf and hard of hearing community, particularly children, through education, research, public policy development, and specialist services.
- Sandra Levy – For distinguished service to the arts as a film and television director and producer, and through strategic leadership and educational roles.
- Professor David Bruce Lindenmayer – For distinguished service to conservation and the environment in the field of landscape ecology, to tertiary education, and to professional organisations.
- Emeritus Professor John Miles Little, AM – For distinguished service to medicine through the development and promotion of public policy on medical values, ethics and law.
- Winsome McPherson McCaughey – For distinguished service to the community, particularly to local government and early childhood development, and through a broad range of charitable organisations.
- Emeritus Professor Anne Elizabeth Mitchell – For distinguished service to community health, particularly through sexual health research, policy development and program delivery to marginalised communities.
- Professor Michael Kerin Morgan – For distinguished service to medicine as a neurovascular surgeon, researcher and educator, as an international leader and mentor, and to professional organisations.
- Professor John Alexander Mybrgh – For distinguished service to medicine as an intensive and critical care practitioner, educator and researcher, and as an international innovator in patient management.
- Professor Barry William Ninham – For distinguished service to physical sciences through landmark theoretical and practical advances in colloids and surfaces, and as an academic, educator and mentor.
- Professor Terence Michael Nolan – For distinguished service to medicine as a leader in the field of epidemiology and population health, to policy development and advisory roles in immunisation, and to education.
- Doctor Daniel Thomas Norton – For distinguished service to business and finance, particularly in the area of infrastructure development, to the energy sector, and to medical research.
- Doctor Lewis William O'Brien – For distinguished service to the Indigenous community of South Australia as an elder and educator, and to the promotion and protection of Indigenous culture and heritage.
- Desmond Dominic Pearson – For distinguished service to public sector governance in the areas of public accountability and management, and to the development of innovative financial sustainability measures.
- Keith Leon Potger – For distinguished service to the performing arts as an entertainer, through seminal contributions to Australian music, and as a supporter of a range of not-for-profit organisations.
- Emeritus Professor Ian Mackay Ritchie – For distinguished service to science in the field of chemistry and hydrometallurgy, as an academic and educator, and to fostering technical innovation in business and industry.
- Professor Alan Rosen – For distinguished service to medicine in the field of mental health as a psychiatrist and clinician, to national health service reform, and to professional organisations.
- Doctor Stewart Francis Routledge – For distinguished service to veterinary science, particularly the provision of technical assistance in developing countries, and to business through promoting Australian interests internationally.
- Professor Ingrid Eileen Scheffer – For distinguished service to medicine in the field of paediatric neurology as a clinician, academic and mentor, and to research into the identification of epilepsy syndromes and genes.
- Winifred Schubert – For distinguished service to the community as a supporter and benefactor of a range of not-for-profit organisations, Australian artists and galleries.
- Professor Martin Silink, AM – For distinguished service to medicine in the field of paediatric endocrinology as a clinician, researcher and administrator, and to international leadership in diabetes care and advocacy.
- Philippa Aird Smith – For distinguished service to the community, particularly as a benefactor to a range of charitable organisations, and as a contributor to the social, environmental and cultural landscape of Australia.
- John Chun Sai So – For distinguished service to local government and community relations, as an ambassador for cultural diversity, and to the promotion of Melbourne as a tourist and investment destination.
- Doctor Zygmunt Edward Switkowski – For distinguished service to the community, particularly to tertiary education administration, scientific organisations and the telecommunications sector, to business, and to the arts.
- Marjorie Anne Tripp – For distinguished service to the Indigenous community through the promotion of improved aged care and health outcomes and recognition of Indigenous Australians in the armed forces.
- Carl Vine – For distinguished service to the performing arts as a composer, conductor, academic and artistic director, and to the support and mentoring of emerging performers.
- Maureen Wheeler – For distinguished service to business and commerce as a publisher of travel guides, and as a benefactor to a range of Australian arts and aid organisations.
- Tony Wheeler – For distinguished service to business and commerce as a publisher of travel guides, and as a benefactor to a range of Australian arts and aid organisations.
- Professor Hugh John White – For distinguished service to international affairs, through strategic defence studies as an analyst, academic and adviser to government, and to public administration.
- Rhonda Mary White – For distinguished service to the pharmacy profession, particularly through contributions to education and retail management practices, and as a role model for women in business.
- Her Honour Chief Judge Patricia Mary Wolfe – For distinguished service to the judiciary, to the law through legal education reform, and as a mentor and role model for women.
- Bruce William Woodley – For distinguished service to the performing arts as an entertainer, through seminal contributions to Australian music, and as a supporter of a range of not-for-profit organisations.
- Professor Ian Wronski – For distinguished service to tertiary education, particularly through leadership and research roles in Indigenous, rural and remote health, and to medicine in the field of tropical health.

==== Military Division ====
===== Navy =====
- Rear Admiral Timothy William Barrett, AM, CSC, RAN – For distinguished service as Commander Border Protection Command and Commander Australian Fleet Command.

===== Army =====
- Major General John Graham Caligari, DSC, AM – For distinguished service as Head Modernisation and Strategic Planning-Army and Head Systems Capability Development Group.

===== Air Force =====
- Air Vice Marshal Colin Barry Thorne, AM (Retd) – For distinguished service to the Australian Defence Force in senior materiel appointments.

=== Member (AM) ===
==== General Division ====
- Cecil Phillip Ainsworth – For significant service to the community of the Illawarra through a range of not-for-profit, social welfare and health insurance organisations.
- Professor Michael James Aitken – For significant service to the business and finance sector, particularly to market surveillance and fraud detection technologies, and to education.
- Constance Wainwright Alomes – For significant service to community health, to suicide prevention, counselling and support programs, and to professional training.
- Emeritus Professor Helen Beatrice Armstrong – For significant service to landscape architecture as an academic, particularly to the study of cultural, heritage and migration environments.
- Michael John Arnott – For significant service to the primary industry sector through executive roles, and to the community of Boorowa.
- Elsa Arkin – For significant service to the conservation and protection of the natural, built and cultural heritage environment, to women, and to the arts.
- Professor Hurriyet Babacan – For significant service to the multicultural community, to education as an academic and author, and as an advocate for social policy development.
- Professor Nadia Badawi – For significant service to paediatrics and neo-natal intensive care medicine as a clinician and researcher, and to the promotion of research into cerebral palsy.
- Professor Arthur Barrington Baker – For significant service to medicine, particularly to cardiovascular anaesthesia, to medical education, and to professional medical organisations.
- Noel George Blencowe – For significant service to environmental education through a range of leadership roles, and to the promotion of sustainability and social equity.
- Doctor Tim Bonyhady – For significant service to education in the field of climate and environmental law, as an academic and researcher, and to the visual arts.
- Eric Bottomley, † – For significant service to the environment and conservation, and to the development of sustainability education programs for students.
- Paul Anthony Brennan – For significant service to business and commerce, and as an advocate for the design of harm minimisation programs for people affected by drugs.
- Christopher Brown – For significant service to the tourism, infrastructure and transport sectors through leadership roles, and to the community.
- Emeritus Professor Michael MacLaren Bryden – For significant service to veterinary science, and to education, particularly in the field of animal anatomy, as an academic and researcher.
- Professor Stephen John Buckman – For significant service to science in the field of experimental atomic physics as a leading researcher, academic and author.
- Doctor Jonathan Gareth Burdon – For significant service to respiratory medicine as a clinician and researcher, particularly occupational asthma, and to medical administration.
- Doctor Barbara Caine – For significant service to tertiary education, particularly to gender studies, to women's history, and as a role model and mentor.
- Doctor Brian Leslie Cambourne – For significant service to education in the field of language and literacy, to professional skills development for teachers, and as an author.
- Doctor David Griffiths Campbell – For significant service to rural and remote medicine and education, as a supporter of Indigenous health professionals, and to general practice.
- Molly Frances Carlie – For significant service to community health through seminal contributions to organisations providing palliative care, and to the performing arts.
- Richard John Carter – For significant service to the mining and minerals sector, to professional standards and education, and to the Uniting Church in Australia.
- Angela Emily Catterns – For significant service to the broadcast media industry as a radio presenter, and to social welfare organisations.
- Anthony Ian Chaters – For significant service to the eco-tourism industry, particularly to nature-based recreation, and to environmental education and visitor programs.
- Professor Leslie Cleland – For significant service to medicine as a clinician, particularly in the field of rheumatology, and to professional medical organisations.
- The Honourable David John Collier – For significant service to the judiciary and to the law, particularly through the Family Court of Australia, and to legal education.
- Richard Andrew Colman, OAM – For significant service to sport as a gold medallist at the London 2012 Paralympic Games, and to the community.
- Francis John Conroy – For significant service to the finance and banking sector, to corporate administration, and to the arts, health and secondary education.
- Janette Ann Cook – For significant service to the community of the Kinglake area in the aftermath of the 2009 Victorian bushfires.
- Vincent Warrior Copley – For significant service to the Indigenous community as an advocate for the improvement of social, legal and economic rights and cultural identity.
- Geoffrey Ashton Cousins – For significant service to the community through the establishment of the Starlight Children's Foundation, and to the visual and performing arts.
- Angela Penelope Crammond – For significant service to children through executive and fundraising roles with Barnardos Australia, and to the community.
- The Honourable Philip Damien Cummins – For significant service to the judiciary and to the law, to criminal justice and legal reform, to education, and to professional associations.
- Adjunct Associate Professor Elizabeth Dabars – For significant service to medical administration, particularly to nursing and midwifery, and to community and mental health organisations.
- Cholmondeley Darvall – For significant service to the finance and banking sector, and through contributions to not-for-profit organisations and the performing arts.
- Ashley Judith Dawson-Damer – For significant service to the visual and performing arts as a supporter and benefactor of cultural organisations, and to medical research.
- Professor Caroline May De Costa – For significant service to medicine, particularly to Indigenous and migrant women's reproductive health.
- Coral Lynette Dixon – For significant service to international education through leadership roles, and to the development of Australia-Asia social and cultural linkages.
- Kaylene Dyer – For significant service to maternal-fetal medicine through clinical midwifery roles, and to the coordination of pre and post natal care programs.
- Robert Kerridge Elix – For significant service to local government through leadership roles, to the community of Darwin, and to sporting and horseracing organisations.
- Robert William Elworthy – For significant service to veterans and their families, particularly to those who served in Vietnam, and to community health care.
- Ian Neil Ferres – For significant service to the finance and investment sector through a range of advisory roles, to professional organisations, and to the community.
- Professor Ross Andrew Fitzgerald – For significant service to education in the field of politics and history as an academic, and to community and public health organisations.
- Professor Peter Joseph Fletcher – For significant service to cardio vascular medicine as a clinician and administrator, and to heart health programs and medical education.
- The Honourable Demetrios (Jim) Fouras – For significant service to the Parliament of Queensland, as an advocate for homeless youth and social justice, and to the community.
- Ian Bjarne Frank – For significant service to medical administration and education, particularly training, accreditation and assessment for health care practitioners.
- Elizabeth Therese Fritz – For significant service to social welfare through providing accommodation and support services for the homeless.
- John Edward Frost, OAM – For significant service to the performing arts, particularly as a producer, and as a supporter of industry personnel.
- Michael Gawenda – For significant service to the print media industry as a journalist and editor, and to the advancement of professional education and development.
- Professor John Gibson – For significant service to medicine in the field of haematology, to medical education, and through accreditation and clinical governance advisory roles.
- Professor Graham Gerald Giles – For significant service to medicine, particularly through cancer epidemiology and public health research organisations, and as a mentor.
- Phillip Ronald Gould – For significant service to rugby league football as an administrator, commentator, coach and player, and to the community.
- Richard Worsley Gray – For significant service to the community through policy direction and reform in the not-for-profit aged care and disability service sectors.
- Bradley Trevor Greive – For significant service to wildlife conservation through philanthropic contributions, and to literature as an author and mentor.
- Robert Lyall Hannaford – For significant service to the visual arts as a painter and sculptor.
- Professor Douglas John Hargreaves – For significant service to engineering as an educator and researcher, to professional organisations, and to the community.
- Andrew Harper – For significant service to international relations through leadership in the coordination of humanitarian assistance to Syrian refugees in Jordan.
- Virginia Mary Haussegger – For significant service to the community, particularly as an advocate for women's rights and gender equity, and to the media.
- Doctor Felicity Helen Hawker – For significant service to intensive care medicine as a clinician and academic, and to professional organisations.
- Sister Joan Veronica Healy – For significant service to the Catholic Church in Australia, and as a social welfare advocate in South East Asia.
- Ralph Jacob Heimans – For significant service to the visual arts as a portrait painter.
- Doctor Margaret Helen Henderson – For significant service to the community through the preservation and documentation for Western Australian history, and to public health.
- Doctor Zelle Carmel Hodge – For significant service to medicine, particularly through a range of roles in professional organisations, and to women.
- The Honourable Michael Holden – For significant service to family law as a Judge of the Family Court of Australia, and to the legal profession in Western Australia.
- Doctor Ernest Michael Hoolihan – For significant service to the community as an advocate for Indigenous culture in northern Queensland.
- John Norman Isaac – For significant service to the community of Melbourne, particularly through St Vincent's Hospital, and to the law.
- Professor James Paton Isbister – For significant service to medicine in the fields of haematology and transfusion medicine, and to professional organisations.
- Kong Su Jape – For significant service to business and commerce in the Northern Territory and in Timor-Leste.
- Doctor Stephen Gary Jiggins – For significant service to the community of the Australian Capital Territory, particularly as an advocate for improved road safety.
- Associate Professor Michael Robert Johnson – For significant service to the blind and those with low vision, to education, and to the community.
- Hetty Margarete Johnston – For significant service to the community through a range of organisations promoting the welfare and rights of children.
- Emeritus Professor Graham Alfred Jones – For significant service to mathematics education as an academic and leader in the profession, and to the community.
- Doctor Marlene Kamga – For significant service to engineering, particularly through leadership roles in professional organisations, and as a role model.
- John Ross Kirby – For significant service to business and commerce, particularly in the movie and entertainment industry, and to the community.
- Michael Oscar Klug – For significant service to the law in the field of alternative dispute resolution, and to the community.
- Christopher Paul Knoblanche – For significant service to arts administration, to the community, and to the business and finance sector.
- Professor Paul Alter Komesaroff – For significant service to ethics in medicine as a physician, researcher and philosopher.
- John Russell Langford – For significant service to the community through providing social welfare services for people with mental health issues.
- Rosemary Leitch – For significant service to the community of Armidale, to local government, and to a range of arts organisations.
- Professor Michael Herbert Levy – For significant service to medicine in the field of public health as a clinician, academic and educator.
- Emeritus Professor Alan William Lindsay – For significant service to higher education, to academic and business development, and to international education.
- Professor Peter Charles Little – For significant service to business education, particularly university and industry collaboration and engagement, and to the community.
- Emeritus Professor William Raymond Louden – For significant service to higher education in Western Australia as a leader in teacher education and sector reform.
- Fergus Stewart McArthur – For significant service to the Parliament of Australia, to policy debate in economics, industrial relations and agriculture, and to the community of Victoria.
- Professor Carolyn Patricia McGregor – For significant service to science and innovation through health care information systems.
- John Kennedy McLaughlin – For significant service to the judiciary and to the law, particularly through the documentation and preservation of Australian legal and constitutional history, and to the community.
- Professor Michael John McLaughlin – For significant service to conservation and the environment, particularly through developing public policy on science-based strategies for minimising metals in the environment.
- Professor Richard George McLean – For significant service to medicine, particularly in the fields of rural health and nuclear medicine as a clinician, academic and mentor.
- Rosamond Helen Madden – For significant service to leadership and reform in the disability sector as an administrator, statistician and academic.
- Mr Gregory Stuart Martin, PSM – For significant service to transport, particularly through the development of policy and industry reform, and through executive roles in transport policy, planning, road infrastructure and network management.
- Peter Wilfred Mattick – For significant service to the community through a range of philanthropic contributions, and to business and commerce.
- Murray Meaton – For significant service to the energy and resources sector in Western Australia, particularly through the administration of mining royalties, and to the community of Melville.
- Robert Werner (Bob) Meyer – For significant service to architecture and urban planning, particularly through the development of infrastructure in Sydney, and to professional associations.
- Doctor David Searle Mitchell – For significant service to conservation and the environment, particularly wetland and water research.
- Rodney David Mollett – For significant service to the built environment and the architecture profession through contributions to professional bodies, and to the community of North Beach.
- Stephen James Moneghetti – For significant service to athletics as a marathon runner, administrator and mentor to young athletes.
- Lieutenant Colonel John Joseph Moore, RFD, (Retd) – For significant service to the commemoration of Australian military and sporting events as a radio broadcaster and television presenter.
- Rabbi Frederick Howard Morgan – For significant service to the Hebrew congregation of Victoria, particularly through the development of spiritual and educational programs, and to a range of interfaith organisations.
- Michael Kenneth Munro – For significant service to journalism as a television current affairs reporter and presenter, and to the community as an ambassador for a range of charitable organisations.
- Cameron Lionel Murphy – For significant service to the community through a range of human rights and civil liberty organisations.
- Professor Phillip Nagley – For significant service to education in the field of biochemistry and molecular biology.
- Professor John Robert O'Toole – For significant service to drama in education, as a lecturer, author, mentor and researcher.
- Lois Peeler – For significant service to the Indigenous community as an educator, advocate and role model.
- Doctor Terence Michael Percival – For significant service to science and technology through landmark developments in broadband and wireless communications.
- Gwynneth Mary Petrie – For significant service to medicine as a senior hospital pharmacist, mentor and innovator.
- Doctor Prem Phakey – For significant service to the Indian community of Victoria, to aged welfare, and to education.
- Doctor Harry Charles Phillips – For significant service to education, particularly in the fields of politics and civics.
- Geoffrey William Pie – For significant service to architecture and heritage preservation as a practitioner, mentor and leader.
- Professor James Austin Piper – For significant service to tertiary education, particularly through research in applied laser physics.
- Nicholas George Politis – For significant service to rugby league football as an administrator.
- Professor Michael Leslie Poole – For significant service to environmental science as a leader, researcher and adviser to government.
- Brian Vincent Potter, QFSM, † – For significant service to the community through innovation in fire response techniques and incident management.
- Professor Henry Miles Prince – For significant service to medicine, particularly through blood cancer research, improved patient care and fundraising leadership.
- Professor Derek Melville Prinsley – For significant service to medicine as a practitioner and researcher in the field of geriatric care.
- Susan Barbara Rix – For significant service to business and the community through a range of executive roles.
- John Barry Roberts – For significant service to the mining and resources industry, particularly to exploration and professional organisations.
- David Edward Robertson – For significant service to the design industry as a leader and as an advocate for innovation.
- The Honourable Peter Isaac Rose, QC – For significant service to the legal profession, particularly in the field of family law.
- Wayne William Roycroft – For significant service to equestrian sports as a coach, competitor and administrator.
- Professor John Paul Seale – For significant service to medicine as a clinical pharmacologist, particularly in the field of respiratory illnesses.
- Donald Harry Seccombe – For significant service to the community, particularly through cricket administration and the clubs industry.
- Doctor Gabriel John Shannon – For significant service to medicine as a consultant physician, particularly as a clinical innovator.
- Doctor Rosemary Joan Sheehan – For significant service to child welfare and the law, particularly through dispute resolution conferencing.
- Emeritus Professor Anthony Josiah Smith – For significant service to medicine as a clinical pharmacologist, and to regulation and quality use of medicines.
- Professor Tania Christine Sorrell – For significant service to medicine and the community as an infectious diseases researcher and adviser.
- Doctor Gary Raymond Speck – For significant service to medicine as an orthopaedic surgeon, and to professional organisations.
- Sally Louise Stevenson – For significant service to social welfare in Australia and overseas through charitable and government programs.
- Associate Professor Cheryl Frances Stock – For significant service to the performing arts as a choreographer, educator and administrator.
- Lorna June Stone – For significant service to community health through roles with a range of organisations.
- Professor Anne Penfold Street – For significant service to science education in the field of mathematics.
- Professor Jeffrey Szer – For significant service to medicine as a practitioner and administrator in the field of clinical haematology.
- Professor James Tatoulis – For significant service to medicine as a cardiothoracic surgeon, and as an adviser to government.
- Lyndon William Terracini – For significant service to the performing arts as an opera performer, director and administrator.
- Douglas John Thompson – For significant service to the community in the field of aged care.
- Clyde Spence Thompson, GM – For significant service to community health, particularly through the Royal Flying Doctor Service of Australia.
- Mark Steven Townend – For significant service to the community, particularly through animal welfare services.
- Professor Alexander Tzannes – For significant service to architecture, as a practitioner and educator, and through professional organisations.
- Christine Rae Uusworth – For significant service to the community, particularly through leadership of the Royal Children's Hospital Good Friday Appeal.
- Alexander Watson, † – For significant service to the community as an advocate for gay and lesbian rights.
- Councillor John Odin Watson – For significant service to the community of the Tamar Valley, and to the Australian Parliament.
- Hean Bee Wee – For significant service to the community through international contributions to gender equity and multicultural affairs.
- Lynlee Vanessa White – For significant service to the community as an animal rights and welfare advocate.
- Adjunct Professor Robert Gordon Whittaker – For significant service to the building and construction industry as a leader and educator.
- Richard Stephen Wilkins – For significant service to the community through a range of charities, and to the entertainment industry.
- Doctor Michael Nesbit Willoughby – For significant service to medicine in the field of paediatric haemotology and oncology.
- Eleanor Katrine Witcombe – For significant service to the arts as a writer for radio, film, television and theatre.
- John Thomson Wood – For significant service to the community as a consumer rights and complaints handling advocate and adviser.
- Charles Michael Wright – For significant service to veterans and their families, and to animal welfare.
- Professor Samina Yasmeen – For significant service to international relations as an academic, adviser and social welfare advocate.
- Professor Jennifer Kay Zimmer – For significant service to the visual arts as an administrator, academic and publisher.

==== Military Division ====
===== Navy =====
- Captain Nicholas Kim Bramwell, RAN – For exceptional service to the Royal Australian Navy as the Director International Fleet Review and in significant command and leadership positions.
- Captain Raymond John Leggatt, CSC, RAN – For exceptional service to the Royal Australian Navy across the fields of capability management, training, command and operations.

===== Army =====
- Warrant Officer David Malcolm Ashley, OAM – For exceptional service as the Regimental Sergeant Major of Forces Command, the Regimental Sergeant Major of Combined Team – Uruzgan, and the Regimental Sergeant Major of the Army.
- Brigadier Gregory Charles Bilton, CSC – For exceptional service in the fields of Army modernisation as Director General Development and Plans Army, and command as Commander 7th Brigade.
- Lieutenant Colonel Brian Robert Campbell – For exceptional performance of duty as the Staff Officer Fatalities within the Chief of Staff Branch – Army Headquarters.
- Brigadier Peter Edmond Daniel, CSC – For exceptional service as Director General Supply Chain, Joint Logistics Command and Colonel Support at Headquarters Land Command-Army.
- Brigadier Stephen Hugh Porter – For exceptional service to the Australian Army as the Assistant Commander (Training), 2nd Division and Commander of the 11th Brigade.
- Brigadier Marcus Allan Thompson – For exceptional service as Commanding Officer 3rd Combat Signals Regiment, a Defence representative while seconded to the Department of Prime Minister and Cabinet, and Director General Special Operations Capability.

===== Air Force =====
- Warrant Officer Dimitri Alexandre Dufour – For exceptional service to the Royal Australian Air Force as the maintenance lead in the United States Resident Project Team for an F/A-18 Hornet upgrade, and Warrant Officer Engineer of Number 3 Squadron.
- Air Commodore Henrik Ehlers – For exceptional service as Director Coordination – Air Force, Director General Defence Force Recruiting and Director General Culture Reviews Response from 2008 to 2013.
- Group Captain Sarah Jane Pearson, CSM – For exceptional service to the Australian Defence Force in the field of logistics.
- Air Commodore Michael Christian Walkington – For exceptional service to the Australian Defence Force in the fields of telecommunications acquisition and sustainment, capability enablement, and Australian air traffic management.

=== Medal (OAM) ===
==== General Division ====
- José Miguel Aguilera – For service to nursing, and to professional organisations.
- Tony Alexander – For service to veterans and their families.
- Leonard Alford – For service to the community through support for single parents, and to a range of sporting organisations.
- Graham Alastair Allen – For service to the community, particularly through service organisations.
- Patricia Mary Allen – For service to the community of the Hunter Valley.
- Romilda Amorosa – For service to the community through support for cancer control organisations.
- Colleen Mary Andrew – For service to the community through church and service organisations.
- Jeffrey Eric Appel – For service to the community, particularly in the area of social welfare.
- Professor Minoti Vivek Apte – For service to medicine, to tertiary education, and to the Indian community of Sydney.
- Cliff Armitage, PSM – For service to youth, and to the community of the Australian Capital Territory.
- Alan John Arnold – For service to the community of the Hunter Valley.
- Thomas Reginald Baker – For service to conservation of the environment in the Queanbeyan region.
- Rowland John Ball – For service to the law, to tertiary education, and to professional organisations.
- John Ballestrino – For service to the community, particularly through support for sporting organisations.
- Paul Eric Bancroft – For service to education, sport and professional organisations.
- Catherine Barker – For service to the community through literary societies.
- George Bonfield Barker – For service to the community of Narooma, and to sport.
- Rosemary Anne Barr – For service to the performing arts, particularly theatre, and to the acting profession.
- Richard Roy Baxter – For service to the community of Peak Hill.
- Suzanne Beattie – For service to the community of Bunyip.
- Marion Pamela Bee – For service to education, particularly through the promotion of literacy among children.
- Joyce May Bell – For service to the community of Clarence Valley.
- Michael Anthony Ball – For service to the community of Hornsby.
- Dimitrios Bellos, APM – For service to the multicultural community, particularly through the Queensland Police Service.
- Christine Lola Belshaw – For service to music, particularly as a teacher and leader of youth ensembles.
- Margaret Jessie Benness – For service to the community, particularly through music.
- Robert Bennett – For service to the community of Narooma.
- Anthony John Benneworth – For service to the community of Tasmania, particularly through sporting organisations.
- Harold John Benyon – For service to the community of Kenthurst.
- Gweneth Ruth Berman – For service to the community as a piano teacher, performer and accompanist.
- Doreen Best – For service to the community of the Coonamble region.
- Irene Wanda Biedak – For service to the Polish community in the field of aged care.
- Lex Allen Bittar – For service to education, and to the community of Wagga Wagga.
- Olive Kathleen Black – For service to dog show judging, standards, education and dog welfare.
- Michael Robert Bleus – For service to the Royal Flying Doctor Service of Australia.
- Peter Andrew Blundell – For service to the community, particularly through support for Indigenous students and Rotary International.
- Larry Bolitho – For service to local government, and to the community.
- Paul Rosario Borg – For service to the Maltese community of Victoria.
- Norman Edward Bowen, AFSM – For service to the community, particularly through fire response roles.
- David Hebbert Boykett – For service to the sport of rowing as a coach, competitor and administrator.
- Lynton Alfred Bradford – For service to the community of Castle Hill.
- Tessa Bremner-MacDonald – For service to the performing arts, particularly theatre, and to education.
- Freddie Brincat – For service to people with a disability in South Australia.
- Robert John Brooksby – For service to the community of the Torrens Valley.
- Anne Elizabeth Brown – For service to youth through the Guiding movement, and to the community.
- Henry Wallace Browning – For service to the community of the Bankstown region.
- Norman David Bruce – For service to the community of Baucau, Timor-Leste.
- Giovanni Bueti – For service to the community of Mount Gambier.
- Michael John Burge – For service to community health, particularly as a mental health advocate.
- Thomas George Butcher – For service to the Legacy movement.
- Robert Phillip Byrne – For service to medicine as a general practitioner, and to the community.
- Evelyn Kestina Byron – For service to the community, particularly through the Anglican Parish of Hunters Hill.
- Desmond Anthony Callaghan – For service to the community of the Mitchell Shire.
- Shirley Mary Cameron – For service to the community through the surf lifesaving movement.
- Cheryl Robyn Campbell – For service to the community of Gordonvale.
- Clement Bernard Campbell – For service to the environment, to education, and to the community.
- Suzette Jean Campbell – For service to people with disabilities.
- Gerard Michael Carlin – For service to the community of Cohuna.
- Rosemarie Carole Carman – For service to veterans and their families, and to the community.
- Julieanne Agnes Carriol – For service to the community through cancer support organisations.
- Kathleen Marie Challinor – For service to nursing in the field of audiometry.
- James Wan Ming Chan – For service to the Chinese community of Greater Western Sydney.
- William Robert Chandler – For service to urban design and planning.
- The Reverend Dr Kenneth David Chant – For service to religion, and to theological education.
- Gary Thomas Chapman – For service to surf lifesaving, and to the community of Wollongong.
- Francis Poh Gwan Cheok – For service to medicine, particularly ophthalmology, to professional organisations and to the community.
- Bruce Hardess Clark – For service to the community of Ballarat.
- Michael Newman Clarke – For service to engineering, and to the conservation of Australian heritage.
- Sheila Veronica Clough – For service to the community, particularly as a hospital volunteer.
- Alan Brunton Coleman – For service to engineering as a leader and teacher, and through professional organisations.
- Stanley James Collard – For service to politics, and to the community.
- John Lynton Coombe – For service to local government administration, particularly in the Fleurieu district of South Australia.
- Harry Cooper – For service to veterinary science and animal welfare, and as an author and presenter.
- William Thomas Corey – For service to veterans and their families, and to the community.
- Lynette Pauline Coulston – For service to conservation and the environment, and to the community of Towong.
- Rita Sandra Crews – For service to performing arts as a music teacher, examiner and composer.
- Maxwell Hyman Croot – For service to the community of Shoalhaven, particularly through the brass band movement.
- William Patrick Cross – For service to veterans, and to military history.
- Kenneth James Crotty – For service to the agricultural show movement in Queensland, and to the community.
- Dianne Elizabeth Cullen – For service to youth, particularly through pony clubs and equestrian sports.
- David James Cummins – For service to the community of the Wingecarribee Shire, particularly through aged welfare.
- Donald Arthur Currell – For service to veterans, particularly submariners.
- Paul Arthur Daley – For service to the legal profession, and to the community.
- Pamela Dalrympla – For service to the community, particularly through aged welfare.
- John Henriques Da Silva – For service to the community of Western Australia, to primary industry, and to commerce.
- Lesley Diana Davies – For service to education, particularly as a teacher of French.
- Professor Glen Macartney Davis – For service to science and community health through developing and promoting spinal cord injury therapies.
- Bruce Kennedy Day – For service to local government, and to the community of Lockhart.
- Heather Jane De Haes – For service to performing arts, particularly through facilitating international study and performance opportunities.
- Rita Anna Del Riccio-Zammit – For service to Australian-Italian community, to the arts, and to education.
- Larry John Digney – For service to veterans, to firefighting technologies, and to the community.
- John Francis Dillon – For service to law, and to the community.
- Gilbert Charles Docking – For service to the arts as a gallery Director.
- Philip William Donnelly – For service to the Indigenous community through sporting and charitable initiatives.
- Professor Geoffrey Laurence Driscoll – For service to medicine, particularly assisted fertility services, and to the community.
- Gregory Edmund Duffy – For service to sport, particularly cricket, and to the community of Parkes.
- Jane Frances Duffy – For service to community health, particularly through optometry services.
- Maureen Therese Eddison – For service to the international community through surgical programs to assist people in the Philippines.
- Selwyn Joel Eggmolesse – For service to the Indigenous community through a range of roles.
- Barbara Mary Ell – For service to the community as a supporter and fundraiser for medical organisations.
- David John Eltringham – For service to engineering in the field of infrastructure and planning, and to the community.
- Beryl Phyllis Evans – For service to the community of Norfolk Island, and to the environment.
- Rodney Michael Evans – For service to road transport and to the community, particularly through the Royal Automobile Club of Western Australia.
- Boyd Mitchell Exell – For service to equestrian sports, particularly Four-in-Hand Carriage Driving.
- James Farrell – For service to the community, particularly through social welfare and legal access programs.
- Donald George Faltis – For service to rugby league football in New South Wales.
- Evelyn Margaret Field – For service to the community, particularly through anti-school and workplace bullying initiatives.
- Peter James Filmer – For service to the community, particularly though sport as a coach and administrator.
- Margaret Ann Flannery – For service to local government, and to the community of Dungog.
- Joy Gwendoline Fletcher – For service to the community of Manningham.
- John Marsden Flint – For service to the community, particularly through conservation of the natural and built environment.
- Thomas Flood – For service to community health through leadership and advocacy for people living with stomas.
- Garry Allan Frost – For service to the performing arts as a songwriter, performer and producer.
- Basil Walter Fuller – For service to Australian rules football.
- John Ephraim Gardiner – For service to local government, and to the community of the South West region of Western Australia.
- Associate Professor Heather Ann Gardner – For service to education in the field of public health.
- Timothy Tempest Gavel – For service to the media as a sports broadcaster, and to the community of the Australian Capital Territory.
- Professor Katherine Evelyn Georgouas – For service to medicine in the field of dermatology.
- Philip Frederick Gilbert – For service to veterans and their families.
- Professor Warwick Bruce Giles – For service to medicine, particularly in the field of maternal fetal medicine, and to professional associations.
- Kenneth Struan Gilfillan – For service to architecture, and to professional organisations.
- Neville Arthur Gilpin – For service to polocrosse.
- Reginald Francis Goldfinsh – For service to engineering, particularly through major water supply projects.
- Helena Goldstein – For service to the community, and to the Sydney Jewish Museum.
- Charles Allen Goodwin – For service to the community of the Illawarra region.
- Bruce Gowrie-Smith – For service to agriculture, to rural development, and to the community.
- Angus Boyd Graham – For service to a range of charitable organisations, and to the banking and finance sectors.
- Kevin William Gray – For service to the community of Alstonville.
- Robert Cyril Green – For service to the community of Brisbane through a range of social welfare organisations.
- Milton Henry Gregory – For service to the community of Benalla.
- Wing Commander John David Grierson (Retd) – For service to veterans and their families.
- Carole Anne Hall-Dunstan – For service to the performing arts, and to the community.
- Margaret Beatrice Hanrahan – For service to the community of Corowa.
- Fiona Maree Harley – For service to the community, particularly family welfare.
- Peter Gordon Harley – For service to the community of Lismore through a range of ex-service and sporting organisations.
- Neville Charles Harris – For service to the community of Lake Cargelligo.
- Josephine Mary Hart – For service to the community of Chinchilla.
- Margo Anne Hartley – For service to the community of Dandenong, and to youth through the Scouting movement.
- Anne Theresa Harvey – For service to music education.
- Geoffrey Loris Hassall – For service to the visual arts, particularly to museums and regional galleries.
- Helen Patricia Hatherley – For service to education as a teacher and administrator of specialist schools.
- Emeritus Professor William Richard Hawkey, MBE – For service to music, and to the communities of Canberra and the South Coast region of New South Wales.
- Anthony James Hayes – For service to the surf lifesaving movement, and to the community.
- Babette Elizabeth Hayes – For service to interior design and Australian cuisine as an author
- Marty Haynes – For service to community health, particularly cancer support organisations.
- Arthur Macedon Heatley – For service to primary industry.
- Terrence James Hehir – For service to the dairy industry.
- Philip Crosbie Helé – For service to tourism, and to the community of the Hunter Valley.
- Douglas Norman Helleren – For service to the community of Rosebud-Rye.
- Dr Cameron Henderson – For service to medicine as a general practitioner in the Manilla region.
- John Maxwell Hendry – For service to education, and to cricket.
- Carol Herben – For service to the community of the Illawarra.
- Noel Reginald Herbst – For service to the Australian prawn farming industry, and to the community.
- Malcolm John Hewitt – For service to music education, and to the community.
- John Edward Higgs – For service to education, to the arts, and to the community of Bendigo.
- John Kenneth Higham – For service to athletics as an administrator.
- James William Hignett – For service to Indigenous communities of South Australia.
- Michael William Hinsbey – For service to the preservation of aviation history.
- Vaughan William Hinton – For service to the media through television production, and to the community of Monbulk.
- Dr Caroline Jane Hoffman – For service to community health through breast cancer support organisations.
- David Alexander Horton – For service to the community, particularly through the Anglican Church of Australia.
- Adrian Peter Howard – For service to veterans and their families.
- Dr Peter Dalton Hughes – For service to medicine, to a range of professional associations, and to the community.
- Joan Irene Humble – For service to the visual arts as a landscape artist.
- David Lyndon James – For service to conservation and the environment, and to local government.
- Duncan Kenneth Johnston – For service to veterans and their families.
- Reverend Barbara Mary Jones – For service to the performing arts through dance.
- Pauline Jones – For service to people with a disability and their families.
- John Fotis Karandonis – For service to the footwear industry, particularly as a designer and manufacturer.
- Paul Francis Kathner – For service to the performing arts through scenic art and design.
- Carma Keast – For service to the community of Dandenong, and to the Uniting Church in Australia.
- Anne Christine Keats – For service to music as a publisher of works by contemporary Australian composers.
- John Brennan Keats – For service to music as a publisher of works by contemporary Australian composers.
- Councillor Kenneth James Keith – For service to the community of Parkes, and to local government.
- Robert Henderson Kelly, AFC – For service to military aviation history as a researcher, author and publisher.
- Fiona Ellen Kennedy – For service to nursing, and to the community of the Australian Capital Territory.
- Graham Frederick Kerr – For service to the community of the Wangaratta region.
- Joseph Peter Khoury – For service to the Maronite Church in Australia, and to the Lebanese community of Australia.
- Gwenan Faleiry Koczkar – For service to the community through choir music.
- Dr Tomas Kron – For service to medicine, and to research and education.
- Professor Ahmed Suleman Latif – For service to medicine in rural and remote communities, and to Indigenous health.
- Desmond Edward Lattin – For service to the community of Mount Gambier.
- Allan Leeson – For service to the community of north west Tasmania.
- Colin Eric Levy – For service to the visual arts, particularly ceramics.
- Peter Wayne Lewis – For service to optometry, particularly eye care in Indonesia and Timor-Leste.
- Donald George Liddle – For service to the preservation of Australian automotive history.
- Richard Suor Lim – For service to the community through a range of social welfare organisations.
- Thay Lim – For service to the Chinese community of south west Sydney.
- Donald Gordon Limn – For service to veterans.
- Ian Mileham Litchfield – For service to the community of the Lithgow region.
- Robert George Loone – For service to local government, and to the community of Meander Valley.
- Adrian Noel Loughnan – For service to the print media industry, and to the community of Yarrawonga-Mulwala.
- Raymond David Love – For service to the preservation of Australian rail heritage.
- Marilla Lowery – For service to refugees, and to the community of Braidwood.
- Bruno Luigi Spedalieri - For service to the community of the Broken Bay region.

==== Military Division ====
===== Navy =====
- Warrant Officer Gary Paul Fuss – For meritorious service in the field of Navy culture transformation and for exceptional leadership as a ship's Warrant Officer in ANZAC Class ships.
- Commander Peter Reginald Tedman, DSM, RAN – For meritorious service to the Royal Australian Navy in the fields of operations and planning.
- Lieutenant Commander Amy Maree York, RAN – For meritorious devotion to duty in the fields of general and peri-operative military nursing across a range of healthcare settings in the Australian Defence Force.

===== Army =====
- Sergeant Trevlyn Justin Green – For meritorious performance of duty as an aircraft technician in the Rotary Wing Group on Operation SLIPPER.
- Captain J – For meritorious service to the Australian Army Reserve and Special Operations Command.
- Warrant Officer Class One Michael Walter King, CSM – For meritorious service as the Regimental Quartermaster Sergeant of the 1st, 2nd and 3rd Battalions of the Royal Australian Regiment.
- Major Ian Matthew Lakey – For meritorious service as Regimental Sergeant Major of Force Support Unit – One on Operation SLIPPER; Regimental Sergeant Major of 1st Combat Service Support Battalion; and Regimental Sergeant Major of Force Support Unit – Seven on Operation SLIPPER.
- Major James William Masters – For meritorious service to the Combat Training Centre – Jungle Training Wing, Tully during postings as an instructor since 1996 and as Officer Commanding (2011 to 2013).
- Warrant Officer Class One Elizabeth Anne Matthews – For meritorious service as the Health Operations Warrant Officer at Headquarters 17th Combat Service Support Brigade, the Health Warrant Officer at Headquarters Forces Command and as Army's Senior Medical Technician at the Directorate of Army Health.
- Warrant Officer Class One Matthew George Smith – For meritorious performance of duty in Army personnel management and force structure modernisation roles over an extended period of service.
- Warrant Officer Class One John James Stonebridge, BM – For meritorious service as the Regimental Sergeant Major of the 12th/40th Battalion, the Royal Tasmania Regiment, and the 1st Battalion, the Royal Australian Regiment.
- Warrant Officer Class One Michelle Wyatt, CSM – For meritorious service as the Regimental Sergeant Major of the 3rd Health Support Battalion, Army School of Health, Army Logistic Training Centre, Directorate of Soldier Career Management Army, and Career Management – Army.
- Major Y – For meritorious service to Special Operations Command – Australia in leadership and training roles over an extended period of service.

===== Air Force =====
- Squadron Leader David Michael Burns – For meritorious service to the Royal Australian Air Force in the field of engineering support to training aircraft and maritime patrol capabilities.

== Public Service Medal (PSM) ==
Public Service Medal ribbon

=== Australian Public Service ===
- Scott Poul Bjerregaard – For outstanding public service in client relations and contributing to Australia's engagement with the Middle East Region on immigration matters.
- Kerry Anne Flanagan – For outstanding public service leading to better health and hospital services, especially through the Commonwealth Medical Internship program and the publication of national data on hospitals.
- Bonnie Hoffman – For outstanding public service through a professional and innovative personal contribution to advance Australia's international interests.
- Beryl Jane Knox – For outstanding public service through the provision of executive support at the highest levels of the Australian Public Service and as a role model for public sector executive assistants.
- Christos Moraitis – For outstanding public service to Australia's international affairs as Australia's High Commissioner to Port Moresby and in senior legal and corporate roles at the Department of Foreign Affairs and Trade.
- Glenn Oowbridge – For outstanding public service through Commonwealth legal work and in contributing to the advancement of competition and consumer law, particularly as lead solicitor in the Air Cargo series of litigation matters.
- Phillip James Prior – For outstanding public service in the field of financial management, especially as Chief Finance Officer of the Department of Defence.
- Michael Rothery – For outstanding public service through the delivery of innovative and effective strategies that protect our communities and improve the national capacity to respond to and recover from national security events.
- Giles David Tanner – For outstanding public service in enabling generational change in radiofrequency spectrum management and use, known as the Digital Dividend, and longstanding contribution to broadcasting and spectrum regulation.
- Serena Judith Wilson – For outstanding public service through exceptional contribution to the establishment of the National Disability Insurance Scheme and longstanding and distinguished service to public administration in the area of social policy.
- Doctor Lesley Anne Wyborn – For outstanding public service to geology in Australia, especially highly innovative international leadership in integrated geoscientific data management.
- John Young – For outstanding public service through leadership of the Australian Search and Rescue System.

=== New South Wales Public Service ===
- William Charles Anderson – For outstanding public service to education in New South Wales, particularly to the Schools Spectacular showcasing students' talents and skills.
- Michelle Therese Crowther – For outstanding public service to Legal Aid NSW.
- Peter John Dunphy – For outstanding public service in the improvement of health and safety conditions for employees, particularly concerning the impact of asbestos-related diseases.
- Kevin James Harris – For outstanding public service, particularly to the Vocational Education and Training sector.
- Robyn Gay McKerihan – For outstanding public service to the Department of Education and Communities in New South Wales.
- Gregory John Murdoch – For outstanding public service to local government, particularly to the Murray Shire Council.
- Colin George Nicholson – For outstanding public service to the quality of water and wastewater services across Sydney, the Blue Mountains and the Illawarra region.
- Peter John Nicholson – For outstanding public service to NSW Police.
- Antony Perry – For outstanding public service to local government, particularly to the Central Tablelands Water County Council.
- John Sydney Shenstone – For outstanding public service to Fire and Rescue NSW.
- Katherine Jennifer Watson – For outstanding public service to the Royal Prince Alfred Hospital, particularly in the continued improvement of liver transplant surgery at the hospital.

=== Victorian Public Service ===
- Allan Robert Bawden – For outstanding public service to the Bass Coast and Gippsland regions and to the growth and development of the regions' tourism, agriculture and lifestyle living.
- Pushparani Praxede Brown – For outstanding public service to client service excellence and dedication to implement solid processes and systems.
- Russell David Goodman – For outstanding public service and leadership to Victoria's apicultural industry and stakeholders.
- Jodi Lee Henderson – For outstanding public service and excellence in the delivery of justice services to the community of Victoria.
- Anoushka Lenfeer – For outstanding public service to the Native Title Unit in collaboration with traditional landowners and stakeholders.
- Michelle Evelyn Mead – For outstanding public service and reforms for better service delivery in equal opportunity.
- Eva Perez – For outstanding public service to policing with the development and implementation of strategies.
- Ian Alexander Rossiter – For outstanding public service to local government with the development and delivery of projects.

=== Queensland Public Service ===
- Jennifer Leigh Andrews – for outstanding public service to nursing in Queensland.
- John Nye Boustead – For outstanding public service to education, training and employment.
- Steven Kenneth Jacoby – For outstanding public service to land and spatial information.
- John William Rauber – For outstanding public service to local government, particularly to the Moreton Bay Regional Council.

=== Western Australian Public Service ===
- Ian Thomas Cowie – For outstanding public service, particularly to the City of Gosnells.
- Melissa Anne Vernon – For outstanding public service in improving the access and quality of health services for people living in rural and remote areas of Western Australia.
- Zbigniew Wilk – For outstanding public service to regional Western Australia and excellence in operations at a senior level in the energy industry.

=== South Australian Public Service ===
- Stephen Alfred Alexander – For outstanding public service in the disability and aged care sector.
- Richard Lumb – For outstanding public service in the area of laboratory mycobacteriology; particularly the diagnosis of tuberculosis.
- Luigi Peter Rossi – For outstanding public service in the development and implementation of major infrastructure projects.

== Australian Police Medal (APM) ==
Australian Police Medal ribbon

=== Australian Federal Police ===
- Commander Scott Ian Lee
- Commander Ian McCartney

=== New South Wales Police ===
- Superintendent Wayne Michael Cox
- Inspector Michael Anthony Logan
- Detective Inspector David Geoffrey Moss
- Superintendent Craig Anthony Rae
- Sergeant David Peter Rose
- Senior Sergeant Richard Raymond Simpson
- Senior Sergeant Michael Alan George Steggles
- Chief Superintendent Adam Robb Whyte

=== Victoria Police ===
- Inspector Nicholas Gerard Finnegan
- Superintendent Malcolm John Menzel
- Superintendent Paul Richard Naylor
- Superintendent Clive Steven Rust
- Detective Inspector Roger Schranz

=== Queensland Police ===
- Sergeant Amanda Michelle Cornhill
- Detective Superintendent David Terry Hutchinson
- Chief Superintendent Allan Edward McCarthy
- Senior Sergeant Brendon Michael McMahon
- Superintendent Noel James Powers
- Sergeant Catherine Maree Purcell

=== Western Australian Police ===
- Inspector Geoffrey Malcolm De Sanges
- Brevet Senior Sergeant Neil Duncan Gordon
- Superintendent Scott Hamilton Higgins
- Superintendent Noreen O'Rourke

=== South Australian Police ===
- Detective Sergeant Bernadette Mary Martin
- Superintendent Thomas Gerald Rieniets
- Chief Inspector Kym Andrew Zander

=== Tasmanian Police ===
- Inspector John Mark Beech-Jones

=== Northern Territory Police ===
- Senior Constable Jennifer Roe

== Australian Fire Service Medal (AFSM) ==
Australian Fire Service Medal ribbon

=== New South Wales ===
- Trevor Wayne Bosher
- Craig Allan Brierley
- Peter Henry Carter
- Donald Glenn Coddington
- Malcolm Ernest Connellan
- Michael John Edwards
- Anthony Victor Hackenberg
- Allan Robert Hepplewhite
- Henry Tom Maye
- Alan Patrick Selman
- Victor Hugh Walker

=== Victoria ===
- Philip Richard Hawkey
- Jillian Margaret Read
- Paul Maxwell Rowe
- Graham John Simpson
- Gregory John Williamson, BM

=== Queensland ===
- Neale Micheal Dunphy, BM
- Mark Damian Roche

=== Western Australia ===
- Laurie William Hull
- Kevin Jolly
- Franco Martinelli

=== South Australia ===
- Graeme Dudley Ward

=== Australian Capital Territory ===
- Patrick Duncan Jones
- Andrew James Stark

== Ambulance Service Medal (ASM) ==
Ambulance Service Medal ribbon

=== Queensland ===
- Michael John Metcalfe
- Gregory James Alexander

=== Australian Capital Territory ===
- Grant Hogan

== Emergency Services Medal (ESM) ==
Emergency Services Medal ribbon

=== New South Wales ===
- Kenneth Alan Fletcher
- Barry Charles Harrison
- James Andrew Pullin
- David John White

=== Victoria ===
- Desmond John O'Meara
- Michael John Vanderzalm

=== Queensland ===
- Brian David Kunst

=== Western Australia ===
- Roger Charles Martin
- Trevor Lindsay Patton

=== South Australia ===
- Danny Gordon Wood

=== Australian Capital Territory ===
- Llans Avon Richards-Smith

== Star of Gallantry (SG) ==
Star of Gallantry ribbon

=== Army ===
- Private B – For conspicuous gallantry in action in circumstances of great peril while on operations on Operation SLIPPER

== Commendation for Gallantry ==
Commendation for Gallantry ribbon

=== Army ===
- Private M – For acts of gallantry in action on Operation SLIPPER
- Corporal W – For acts of gallantry in action on Operation SLIPPER

== Distinguished Service Cross and Bar (DSC and Bar) ==
Distinguished Service Cross and Bar ribbon

=== Army ===
- Major General Michael Peter Crane, DSC, AM – For distinguished command and leadership in warlike operations as the Commander of Joint Task Force 633 on Operation SLIPPER from October 2012 to September 2013

== Distinguished Service Cross (DSC) ==
Distinguished Service Cross ribbon

=== Army ===
- Brigadier John William Shanahan, AM, OBE – For distinguished command and leadership in warlike operations as the Commander of the 205th Corps Advisory Team on Operation SLIPPER from September 2012 to August 2013.
- Colonel Simon Andrew Stuart, AM – For distinguished command and leadership in warlike operations as the Commander Combined Team Uruzgan on Operation SLIPPER from October 2012 to August 2013.
- Lieutenant Colonel Malcolm Dalziel Wells – For distinguished command and leadership in warlike operations as the Commanding Officer of the 7th Battalion, the Royal Australian Regiment Task Group on Operation SLIPPER from November 2012 to June 2013.

== Distinguished Service Medal (DSM) ==
Distinguished Service Medal ribbon

=== Navy ===
- Commander Paul James O'Grady, CSM, RAN – For distinguished leadership in warlike operations as the Commanding Officer of HMAS Newcastle on Operationv SLIPPER from May to September 2013.
- Captain Robert Bruce Slaven, RAN – For distinguished leadership in warlike operations as the Director of Operations, Coalition Maritime Forces, and Maritime Operations Adviser, Joint Task Force 633, on Operation SLIPPER from November 2012 to November 2013.

=== Army ===
- Brigadier Andrew William Bottrell, CSC & Bar – For distinguished leadership in warlike operations as Director General Transition and Redeployment on Operation SLIPPER from December 2012 to November 2013.
- Captain C – For distinguished leadership in warlike operations on Operation SLIPPER.
- Corporal Michael James Callaghan – For distinguished leadership in warlike operations as an infantry section commander in support of the 205th Corps Advisory Team on Operation SLIPPER from November 2012 to June 2013.
- Colonel Dean Gregory Franklin, CSC – For distinguished leadership in warlike operations as the Deputy Chief Future Operations, Headquarters International Security Assistance Force Joint Command, Operation SLIPPER, from November 2012 to December 2013.

=== United States Army ===
- Colonel Douglas C Cardinale, United States of America – For distinguished leadership in warlike operations as the Deputy Commander Combine

== Commendation for Distinguished Service ==
Commendation for Distinguished Service ribbon

=== Navy ===
- Captain Jay Barton Bannister, RAN – For distinguished performance of duty in warlike operations as the Chief of Staff, Headquarters Joint Task Force 633, on Operation SLIPPER from January to July 2013.
- Commodore Martin Andrew Brooker, CSC, RAN – For distinguished performance of duty in warlike operations as Deputy Commander Joint Task Force 633 on Operation SLIPPER from November 2012 to May 2013.
- Commodore Charles Neville McHardie, AM, RAN – For distinguished performance of duty in warlike operations as the Commander Combined Task Force 150 on Operation SLIPPER from December 2012 to April 2013.
- Commander Brendon Michael Zilko, RAN – For distinguished performance of duty in warlike operations as Commanding Officer HMAS Toowoomba on Operation SLIPPER from January to May 2013.

=== Army ===
- Major Charmaine Sylvia Benfield – For distinguished performance of duty in warlike operations as the Operations Officer of the Force Support Unit on Operation SLIPPER from October 2012 to June 2013.
- Lieutenant Colonel C – For distinguished performance of duty in warlike operations on Operation SLIPPER.
- Lieutenant Colonel Dean Robert Commons – For distinguished performance of duty in warlike operations as the Senior Intelligence Analyst in Headquarters International Security Assistance Force Joint Command on Operation SLIPPER from October 2012 to August 2013.
- Major Geoffrey Andrew Elford, CSM – For distinguished performance of duty in warlike operations as the Chief Engineer for Combined Team – Uruzgan on Operation SLIPPER from October 2012 to June 2013.
- Sergeant J – For distinguished performance of duty in warlike operations on Operation SLIPPER.
- Major Michael John Kearns, CSM – For distinguished performance of duty in warlike operations as the Officer Commanding the Brigade Adviser Team, 7th Battalion, the Royal Australian Regiment, on Operation SLIPPER, from October 2012 to June 2013.
- Captain M – For distinguished performance of duty in warlike operations on Operation SLIPPER.
- Brigadier Peter John Short, DSC – For distinguished performance of duty in warlike operations as Assistant Commander – Afghanistan, Joint Task Force 633, on Operation SLIPPER from August 2012 to August 2013.

=== Air Force ===
- Group Captain Kevin James Murray, CSM – For distinguished performance of duty in warlike operations as the Commander of the Joint Task Force 633 Air Component on Operation SLIPPER from October 2012 to April 2013.

== Conspicuous Service Cross (CSC) ==
Conspicuous Service Cross ribbon

=== Navy ===
- Captain Simon John Bateman, RAN – For outstanding achievement as Director General Navy Communications and Coordination.
- Lieutenant Commander Phillipa Hay, RAN – For outstanding devotion to duty as Staff Officer Grade Two Maritime Planner, Headquarters Joint Task Force 639 – Operation RESOLUTE in support of Border Protection Operations.
- Commander Michael John Hicking, RANR – For outstanding achievement as the Deputy Director Operations for the Royal Australian Navy International Fleet Review 2013.
- Captain Katherine Anne Richards, RAN – For outstanding achievement in the performance of duties as the Commanding Officer HMAS Cerberus and Director Training Authority – Engineering.
- Captain Sarah Edith Sharkey, RAN – For outstanding achievement as the Director of Clinical Governance and Projects and Australian Defence Force Health Services Project Transition Lead.
- Commander Andrew Craig Wright, OAM, RAN – For outstanding achievement as the Engineering Officer in HMAS Choules during commissioning and acceptance of the ship into Navy service.]

=== Army ===
- Lieutenant Colonel James Andrew Davis – For outstanding achievement as Staff Officer Grade One, The Army Plan in Army Headquarters.
- Colonel Anthony Gerard Hambleton, AM – For outstanding achievement as the Director Personnel Policy and Director General Personnel – Army within Personnel Branch – Army, Army Headquarters.
- Lieutenant Colonel Phillip Frederick Hills – For outstanding achievement as the Staff Officer Grade One, Career Adviser Group in the Directorate of Soldier Career Management – Army.
- Colonel Andrew John Hocking – For outstanding achievement as Branch Chief for Functional Contingency Plans and Policy while on exchange within the Headquarters of United States Pacific Command.
- Corporal Benjamin James Katz – For outstanding achievement as a Section Commander and Reconnaissance Patrol Commander with the 2nd Battalion, the Royal Australian Regiment.
- Lieutenant Colonel Bradley Scott Kilpatrick – For outstanding achievement as the Chief Instructor in the Undergraduate Branch of the Australian Defence Force Academy.
- Lieutenant Colonel Damien John McLachlan – For outstanding achievement as a Staff Officer Grade One – Equipment Management in the Directorate of Logistics – Army.
- Lieutenant Colonel Niall Joseph O'Toole – For outstanding achievement as the Brigade Aviation Maintenance Officer for the 16th Aviation Brigade.
- Lieutenant Colonel S – For outstanding achievement as a Staff Officer Grade One on Operation SLIPPER.
- Brigadier Nagy Maher Sorial – For outstanding achievement as Director General Land Vehicle Systems Branch, Defence Materiel Organisation.
- Chaplain Robert Geoffrey Sutherlans – For outstanding achievement as Chaplain of the 1st Intelligence Battalion.

=== Air Force ===
- Group Captain Ian William Browing – For outstanding achievement in expeditionary airbase capability development.
- Group Captain Deanne Margaret Gibbon – For outstanding devotion to duty as Director Review into the Treatment of Women in the Australian Defence Force Project in the Defence people Group.
- Group Captain Gregory Alan Hoffmann – For outstanding achievement as Officer Commanding the Training Aircraft Systems Program Office.
- Group Captain Keith Francis Joiner – For outstanding devotion to duty in test and evaluation for the Australian Defence Force.
- Group Captain Brendan James Rogers – For outstanding achievement in airborne electronic warfare capability development and delivery for the Australian Defence Force.

== Conspicuous Service Medal (CSM) ==
Conspicuous Service Medal ribbon

=== Navy ===
- Chief Petty Officer Rodney Sean Brennan – For meritorious achievement in the performance of duties as the Chief Physical Trainer of HMAS Cairns.
- Leading Seaman Martyn Gijs Hancock – For meritorious achievement as a Leading Seaman in the Royal Australian Navy Band in the area of composing and music arrangement.
- Commander David Philip Landon, RAN – For meritorious achievement in the performance of duty as the Fleet Executive Officer at Fleet Headquarters Australia.
- Chief Petty Officer Jason Damien Little – For meritorious devotion to duty as the Naval Explosive Ordnance Inspector within the Directorate of Explosive Ordnance Services, Joint Logistics Command.
- Chief Petty Officer Samantha Leonie Robson – For meritorious devotion to duty on the staff of Commander Australian Surface Force.

=== Army ===
- Warrant Officer Class One Heike Christa Brown – For meritorious devotion to duty in providing welfare support to Army's wounded, injured and ill personnel as the Member Support Coordinator for Victoria.
- Sergeant C – For meritorious achievement in the performance of duty while posted to the 2nd Commando Regiment.
- Lieutenant Colonel Robert Grant Gibson – For meritorious achievement as the Staff Officer Grade One Career Management Support, Directorate of Reserve Soldier Career Management – Army.
- Lieutenant Colonel David Graham Jenkins – For meritorious achievement as the Staff Officer Grade One Communication, Information Systems and Electronic Warfare, within the Directorate of Logistics – Army.
- Captain M – For meritorious achievement in the performance of duty in Special Operations Command.
- Lieutenant Colonel Andrew Paul Moss – For meritorious achievement as a Career Adviser at the Directorate of Officer Career Management – Army.
- Major Emmet O'Mahoney – For meritorious achievement as Staff Officer Grade Two Personnel Policy Conditions of Service in Army Headquarters.
- Sergeant Belinda Carmel Tottle – For meritorious achievement as the Chef Supervising Sergeant at the 1st Signal Regiment during the period 2012 to 2013.
- Warrant Officer Class Two Glen Andrew White – For meritorious achievement as a Company Sergeant Major in the 1st Recruit Training Battalion.
- Major Anthony George Woolaston – For meritorious achievement as the Staff Officer Grade Two, Force Modernisation, Communications Information Systems and Electronic Warfare, Headquarters Forces Command.

=== Air Force ===
- Squadron Leader Adam James Bowler – For meritorious devotion to duty as the Officer-in-Charge of Servicing and Structural Integrity Flight in the Maritime Patrol Systems Program Office.
- Flight Lieutenant Nadia Justine Harrison – For meritorious achievement as the Staff Officer Grade 3 Satellite Communications for the Directorate of Information and Communications Technology Capability Coordination, Chief Information Officer Group.
- Warrant Officer Sam Lacey – For meritorious achievement as Capability Development Operations One at Headquarters Air Mobility Group.
- Warrant Officer Sean Patrick O'Toole – For meritorious devotion to duty as the Road Movements Officer at Number 22 (City of Sydney) Squadron.
- Wing Commander Nicholas James Robertson – For meritorious achievement as the Staff Officer Logistics and Engineering at Headquarters Number 81 Wing.
- Squadron Leader Phillip Sydney-Jones – For meritorious devotion to duty in AP-3C Orion aircraft operations.
- Wing Commander Paul Stephen White – For meritorious achievement in the field of engineering management for the Air Defence Ground Environment.
- Squadron Leader Brett Robert Williams – For meritorious devotion to duty as Commander Joint Task Force 639 Air Component Coordination Element supporting Operation RESOLUTE.
