= Jamie Collins =

Jamie Collins may refer to:

- Jamie Collins (American football) (born 1989), American football player
- Jamie Collins (footballer, born 1978), English footballer
- Jamie Collins (footballer, born 1984), English footballer
- Jamie Collins (entrepreneur, born 2004), English entrepreneur

== See also ==
- James Collins (disambiguation)
- Jamie Owens-Collins (born 1954), American Contemporary Christian music composer, singer and songwriter
