= Glen Davis =

Glen Davis may refer to:

== People ==
- Glen Davis (athlete), took part in Athletics at the 1932 Summer Olympics – Men's 3000 metres steeplechase
- Glen Davis (basketball) (born 1986), American former basketball player
- Glen M. Davis (born 1952), Australian physiotherapist and professor at the University of Sydney

=== Characters ===
- Glen Davis, a character from the Zoey 101 episode "School Dance"
- Glen Davis, the central character in Father and Son (1996), a novel by American writer Larry Brown

== Places ==
- Glen Davis, New South Wales, a town in Australia, and location of the Glen Davis Shale Oil Works
- Glen Davis Formation from Trucheosaurus

== See also ==
- Glenn Davis (disambiguation)
- Glen Davies (disambiguation)
