= Glen Davies =

Glen(n) Davies may refer to:

- Glen Davies (footballer) (born 1976), English footballer
- Glen Davies (politician) (1943–2003), Australian politician
- Glenn Davies (born 1950), Australian Anglican bishop
- Glen Davies (Welsh footballer) on List of Swansea City A.F.C. players

== See also ==
- Glyn Davies (disambiguation)
- Glen Davis (disambiguation)
- Glenn Davis (disambiguation)
