= Glyn Davies =

Glyn Davi(e)s may refer to:

- Glyn Davies (economist) (1919–2003), Welsh economist
- Glyn Davies (footballer, born 1932) (1932–2013), Welsh footballer
- Glyn Davies (footballer, born 1909) (1909–1985), Welsh footballer
- Glyn Davies (rugby union) (1927–1976), Wales international rugby union player
- Glyn Davies (politician) (born 1944), British Conservative Party politician
- Glyn Davis (born 1959), Australian academic
- Glyn T. Davies (born 1957), U.S. diplomat

== See also ==
- Glen Davies (disambiguation)
