= Nadia Badawi =

Australian physician

- Occupation(s): Medical researcher, neonatologist, and expert on newborn encephalopathy and cerebral palsy

Nadia Badawi AM is an Australian medical researcher and neonatologist with expertise in newborn encephalopathy and cerebral palsy. She is the Chair of Cerebral Palsy at the University of Sydney.

== Life ==
Badawi grew up in Egypt, where she trained in paediatrics and neonatology. After spending time living in Dublin, Ireland, Badawi relocated to Australia in 1992 to undertake a Ph.D under the supervison of Fiona Stanley at the Telethon Institute for Child Health Research in Perth.

In 1997, Badawi moved to Sydney and took up the position of head of the Grace Centre for Newborn Care at the Royal Alexandra Hospital for Children, now called the Children's Hospital at Westmead.

In 2009, Cerebral Palsy Alliance appointed Badawi as Australia's first Chair of Cerebral Palsy, at the University of Notre Dame Australia, to supervise projects funded by the Research Foundation of Cerebral Palsy Alliance. In 2015, the position moved to the Sydney Medical School at the University of Sydney.

In 2015, Badawi co-established the International Cerebral Palsy Research Foundation in the USA. She is a significant contributor to the Australian Cerebral Palsy Register Group, a national register held by the Cerebral Palsy Alliance Research Institute.

== Awards and honours ==
In the 2014 Queen's Birthday Honours, Badawi was appointed to the Order of Australia for her service to paediatrics and neo-natal intensive care medicine as a clinician and researcher, and for her promotion of research into cerebral palsy. Badawi was nominated for 2026 Australian of the Year.
