= Harry Hanford =

Welsh footballer

Personal information
- Full name: Harold Hanford
- Date of birth: 9 October 1907
- Place of birth: Blaengwynfi, Wales
- Date of death: 26 November 1995 (aged 88)
- Position: Centre half

Senior career*
Years	Team	Apps	(Gls)
- Ton Pentre
–	Blaengwynfi		
1927–1935	Swansea Town	201	(0)
1935–1939	Sheffield Wednesday	88	(1)
1939–1940	→ Swindon Town (wartime guest)		
1946–1947	Exeter City	36	(0)
–	Haverfordwest Athletic		

International career
1933–1939	Wales	7	(0)
- * Club domestic league appearances and goals

Harold "Harry" Hanford (9 October 1907 – 1996) was a Welsh footballer who made more than 300 appearances in the Football League playing for Swansea Town, Sheffield Wednesday and Exeter City. He was capped seven times for Wales at senior international level.

In the book by Geraint H Jenkins, 'Proud to be a Swan', Hanford is described as "a muscular, lantern-jawed stopper". Despite having been at the club for only a short time, he is a "veteran" of the Swansea City side struggling under the management of James Thomson towards the end of the 1920s. An inspirational figure in the side who, in times of economic hardship, regularly rallied the troops with the help of the "legendary" Joe Sykes and recorded Football League appearance holder for the Swans, Wilfred Milne.

Hanford was part of the giant killing Swansea Town side that saw off First division Stoke City in the third round of the 1935 FA Cup. Swansea were having a difficult season in division two that year but, goals from S Lowery (2) Hughie Blair and Walter Bussey helped them see off Stoke at the Vetch Field. Hanford played alongside Wilfred Milne, who still holds the club record for most appearances in the English Football League (586). However, the Swans went on to lose to Derby County in the fourth round.
