= Claudia Burton Bradley =

Australian orthopaedist, paediatrician, pharmacist and researcher (1909 – 1967)

Claudia Burton Bradley MBE
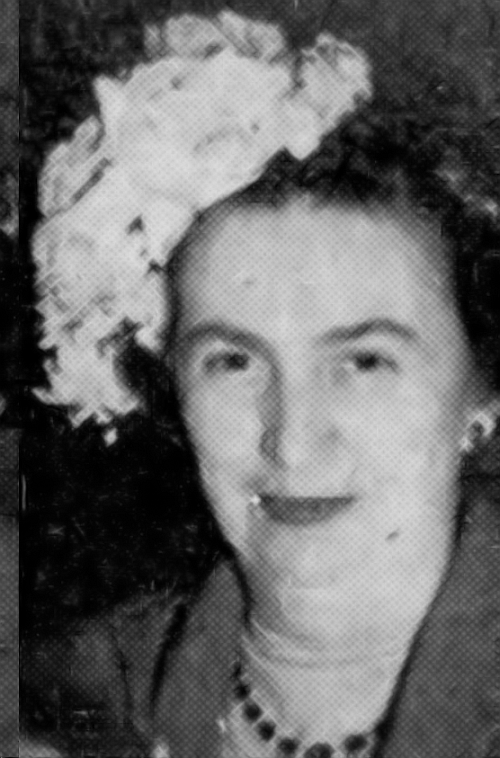
- Claudia Burton Bradley
- Born: Claudia Portia Burton Bradley; 28 November 1909; Richmond, New South Wales, Australia
- Died: 5 October 1967 (aged 57); Cremorne, New South Wales, Australia
- Other names: Claudia Phillips, Claudia Burton-Bradley
- Education: University of Sydney (BA 1940, MBBS 1943)
- Occupations: Pharmacist, paediatrician, orthopaedist
- Spouse: Joel Austen Phillips (1945–1967)
- Relatives: Henry Burton Bradley (grandfather); William Westbrooke Burton (great-granduncle)

Claudia Portia Burton Bradley MBE (28 November 1909 – 5 October 1967) was an orthopaedist, paediatrician and pharmacist. Her main area of work and research was cerebral palsy, which led her to become the first medical director of the Spastic Centre of New South Wales and the founder of the Australian Cerebral Palsy Association.

== Early life ==
Bradley was born in 1909 to Alan Godfrey Burton Bradley and wife Ruby Malvina Drayton in Richmond, New South Wales. Alan Burton Bradley was the son of Henry Burton Bradley, who in turn was the nephew of William Westbrooke Burton. Claudia Burton Bradley was diagnosed with diabetes at the age of 11 and was one of the world's first diabetics to receive treatment with insulin. Her early hospitalisations and treatment influenced her aspirations to study medicine. She attended Cleveland Street Intermediate High School in Sydney and, after graduating in 1928, enrolled at the University of Sydney studying arts and pharmacy. She qualified as a pharmacist in 1930 and worked in the pharmacy of the Western Suburbs Hospital from 1933 to 1938 before returning to university to complete a Bachelor of Medicine, Bachelor of Surgery, which she received in 1943.

== Career ==
Bradley's first role as a resident medical officer was in 1944 at Sydney's Royal North Shore Hospital (RNSH) and later the Rachel Forster Hospital for Women and Children (RFH). In 1945, she was appointed the first medical director of the Spastic Centre of New South Wales, and the same year she married Joel Austen Phillips, a retired businessman. In the following years she was appointed RNSH's honorary clinical assistant in physiotherapy and honorary assistant orthopaedic surgeon at RFH.

Her main area of work was in cerebral palsy; she was involved in international research and pioneered a team-based approach to treatment and habilitation. She campaigned for the "maintenance of dignity in relation to these children as fellow beings" and the encouragement of children with the disease "to lead useful and independent lives". She founded the Australian Cerebral Palsy Association in 1952 and was made an honorary member of the American Academy for Cerebral Palsy.

== Later life ==
Bradley retired in 1962 due to her worsening health as a result of diabetes. She was made a member of the Order of the British Empire in 1966 for her commitment to researching and treating cerebral palsy. She died from a coronary occlusion on 5 October 1967 in Cremorne, New South Wales.
