= Cerebral Palsy Alliance =

Australian nonprofit organisation

- Company type: Non-Profit
- Founded: 1945 (as The Spastic Centre)
- Founder: Audrie and Neil McLeod
- Headquarters: 187 Allambie Road; Allambie Heights, NSW 2100

Cerebral Palsy Alliance (formerly The Spastic Centre) is an Australian nonprofit organisation helping babies, children, teenagers and adults living with cerebral palsy and other neurological and physical disabilities. Its therapy teams work with individuals and families to maximise their participation in the community.

Cerebral Palsy Alliance provides professional development and training for employees within the disability sector. The alliance also funds important cerebral palsy research in Australia and overseas through its Research Foundation, as well as a disability technology accelerator, Remarkable.

Cerebral Palsy Alliance operates from 112 sites throughout metropolitan, regional and rural NSW and the ACT.

== History ==
Cerebral Palsy Alliance was founded on 30 January 1945 by a group of parents of children with cerebral palsy under the leadership of Audrie and Neil McLeod. It was the first organisation of its type in the world for people with cerebral palsy. The first medical director was Dr Claudia Bradley.

The Spastic Centre renamed itself the Cerebral Palsy Alliance in 2011, because of increasing sensitivities to the word "spastic".

== Services ==
Cerebral Palsy Alliance services include:

- Technology services
- Equipment services
- Mobility programs
- Employment services
- Day programs for adults
- Accommodation support
- Respite care
- Therapy and education services
- Aquatic programs
- Information
- Recreation

== Cerebral palsy register ==
An Australian CP Register has been established to guide future research in prevention, intervention and service provision.

== Research Foundation ==
In 2005 Cerebral Palsy Alliance established a Research Foundation to fund Australian and international research to find a prevention and cure for cerebral palsy – a condition that affects more than 17 million people around the world. The Foundation also funds research into improving early diagnosis tools (which can reduce the long-term impact of the disability), treatments (interventions) and technology innovations.

The leader of the research team is Nadia Badawi.

== Fundraising ==
Cerebral Palsy Alliance runs regular fundraising throughout the year:

Miss Australia

Miss Australia Quest/Awards was run by The Spastic Centres of Australia for 45 years. Over its duration entrants, their families, committees, sponsors and the general public of Australia raised in excess of A$87 million.
