= Win Schubert =

Australian businesswoman and philanthropist

- Born: 1938
- Died: 6 April 2017 (aged 79); Gold Coast, Queensland, Australia
- Occupation: businesswoman
- Known for: being a philanthropist in the Queensland arts community

Winifred Schubert AO (1938 – 6 April 2017) was an Australian businesswoman and philanthropist.

She is best known for making generous contributions to art galleries, particularly to the Queensland Art Gallery and Gallery of Modern Art (QAGOMA).

== Business ==
In the 1970s Schubert owned an empire of 32 fashion boutiques in South East Queensland including in Toowoomba, Brisbane and the Gold Coast.

In 1985, she established Art Galleries Schubert on the Gold Coast, which closed in 2009.

== Recognition ==
In 2012, QAGOMA named its Australian collection galleries the Josephine Ulrick and Win Schubert Galleries in honour of Schubert's benefaction. Ulrick was a close friend of Schubert's and was curator and co-director at Art Galleries Schubert until her death in 1997.

In 2014, Schubert was named a Queensland Great. She was also made an Officer of the Order of Australia in the 2014 Queen's Birthday Honours in recognition of her service to the community as a supporter and benefactor of Australian artists and art galleries.

In 2020, the Schubert Circle was established at QAGOMA to recognise other individuals who have made provisions for QAGOMA to be in their Will.

== Personal life and death ==
Schubert died on 6 April 2017 at the age of 79.

Following her death, the daughter of her friend Agnes Tatay contested the Will. Suzzan Tatay unsuccessfully claimed that she was entitled to a portion of the estate.

Three years after Schubert's death, QAGOMA received a $35 million bequest from her estate, which was the biggest single cash gift in the 125-year history of the Gallery.
