= Glenn Davis =

Glenn Davis may refer to:

== Athletes ==
- Glenn Davis (baseball) (born 1961), American baseball player
- Glenn Davis (halfback) (1924–2005), known as "Mr. Outside", American football player
- Glenn Davis (hurdler) (1934–2009), known as "Jeep", Olympic runner and football wide receiver
- Glenn Davis (sportscaster), American sports journalist, soccer player and coach
- Glenn Davis (1990s baseball player)
- Glynn Davis (born 1991), American baseball player

== Politicians ==
- Glenn Davis (Arizona politician), Arizona House of Representatives
- Glenn Davis (politician) (born 1973), American politician from Virginia
- Glenn Robert Davis (1914–1988), U.S. congressman from Wisconsin

== Others ==
- Glenn Davis (American actor), American actor
- Glenn Davis (web design) (born 1961), web designer
- Glenn Davis (producer) on Once a Thief (TV series)

== See also ==
- Glen Davis (disambiguation)
- Glen Davies (disambiguation)
