= Edwina Cornish =

Australian biologist and academic

Edwina Cecily Cornish is an Australian biologist and academic, specialising in biotechnology. Between 2012 and 2016 she was Provost and Senior Vice-president of Monash University. She was previously Deputy Vice-Chancellor (Research) at the University of Adelaide and then at Monash University.

== Early life and education ==
Cornish studied at the University of Melbourne, and graduated with a Bachelor of Science with Honours (BSc (Hons)) degree in biochemistry and a Doctor of Philosophy (PhD) degree in microbiology.

== Career ==
From 2000 to 2004, Cornish was Professor of Biotechnology and Deputy Vice-Chancellor (Research) at the University of Adelaide.

Cornish joined Monash University as Deputy Vice-Chancellor (Research) in 2004, and was promoted to Senior Deputy Vice-Chancellor in 2009. Between 2012 and 2016 she was Provost (Chief Academic Officer) and Senior Vice-president of Monash University.

In November 2015, Cornish was appointed a board member of the Commonwealth Scientific and Industrial Research Organisation for a five-year term.

== Honours ==
In 2001, Cornish was awarded the Centenary Medal "for service to Australian society in biotechnology and university administration". In the 2014 Queen's Birthday Honours, she was appointed an Officer of the Order of Australia (AO) "for distinguished service to higher education, to advances in biotechnology and horticultural genetic modification, and through fostering of partnerships with government, industry and the community".

On 13 March 2013, Cornish was inducted into the Victorian Honour Roll of Women "for providing inspirational leadership as a pioneer in the biotechnology industry and as a transformational leader at Monash University". She is an elected Fellow of the Australian Academy of Technological Sciences and Engineering (FTSE).
