= James E. Collins =

American veterinary physician and academic

- Born: 1953 (age 72–73)
- Education: University of Minnesota, Michigan State University
- Occupations: Veterinary physician, Professor of Veterinary of Atomic Pathology

James E. Collins (born 1953, in Saint Paul, Minnesota) is an American veterinary physician and academic. He is the professor of medicine at the University of Minnesota and its Director of the veterinary diagnostic laboratory.

Collins has written several research papers and articles in the field of veterinarian medicine.

== Biography ==
Collins’ interest for veterinarian medicine was influenced by his brother who is also a veterinarian and a veterinary microbiologist at the University of Wisconsin. He went to the University of Minnesota to study veterinary science, later earning a Doctorate of veterinary medicine. In 1978, after completing his degree and a one-year practise, Collins began pursuing a master's degree in veterinary pathology at Michigan State University. In 1980, he started his Ph.D. in Veterinary Pathology and Pathobiology. During his Ph.D., he was hired by Martin Berglund at South Dakota State University to help with swine diagnostic pathology.

== Career ==
In 1986, Collins completed his Ph.D. and followed up as an associate professor in the Department of Veterinary Diagnostic Medicine, University of Minnesota with Berglund. During his research, Collins discovered a particular type of injury in pigs. This discovery led him to experimentally reproduce the disease in collaboration with fellow researchers and then create related vaccines and diagnostic tests known as “Porcine reproductive and respiratory syndrome” or PRRS. Collins was then recognized for this particular discovery.

In 1998, Collins became the director of the University of Minnesota's Veterinary Diagnostic Laboratory. During his tenure, he contributed to the creation and upgrade of the molecular diagnostic lab. He has been an important part of Zepto Life Technology as he has assisted the company's staff with diagnostic methodology selection and development.

In September 2015, Collins resigned from his position of director of the University of Minnesota's Veterinary Diagnostic Lab.

=== Patents ===
Collins is the author of numerous patents filed with the United States Patent and Trademark Office during his career. Here is below a list of his patents granted in USA, the European Union, Canada and Danemark.

- “Kit for detecting swine infertility and respiratory syndrome (SIRS) virus”. September 2003. US Patent 10/281,884.
- “Methods for detecting swine infertility and respiratory syndrome virus”. October 2013. US Patent 6,498,008 B2
- “Porcine reproductive and respiratory syndrome virus and method for detection”.
- “SIRS vaccine and diagnosis method”. Canadian Patent 2,116,384.
- “Immunogenic composition containing inactivated swine infertility and respiratory syndrome virus”, June 2001. US Patent 6,241,990.
- “Method for Diagnosis of Mystery Swine Disease”. November 1997. US Patent 5,683,865.

== Partial bibliography ==
- Porcine Reproductive and Respiratory Syndrome: A Review. Recent Advances in Swine Health and Production, Vol. 2. (1992)
- Porcine Respiratory and Reproductive Syndrome. In Disease of Swine (7th edition). (1992)
- Spatial dispersal of porcine reproductive and respiratory syndrome virus-contaminated flies after contact with experimentally infected pigs. (2004)
- Evaluation of five antibody detection tests for diagnosis of bovine paratuberculosis. (2005)
- Evaluation of the effects of animal age, concurrent bacterial infection, and pathogenicity of porcine reproductive and respiratory syndrome virus on virus concentration in pigs. (2006)
- Evaluation of a rapid fecal PCR test for detection of Mycobacterium avium subsp. paratuberculosis in dairy cattle. (2006)
- The impact of animal age, bacterial coinfection, and isolate pathogenicity on the shedding of porcine reproductive and respiratory syndrome virus in aerosols from experimentally infected pigs. (2006)
- Serological evaluation of precolostral serum samples to detect Bovine viral diarrhea virus infections in large commercial dairy herds. (2008)
- Detection, characterization, and control of bovine viral diarrhea virus infection in a large commercial dairy herd. (2009)

== Awards ==
- Recognition for pioneering research on porcine reproductive and respiratory syndrome.
- Transmissible Diseases of Swine Committee, United States Animal Health Association - 1992
- Mark of Excellence Award, College of Veterinary Medicine, University of Minnesota - 1993
- Veterinarian of the Year, Minnesota Veterinary Medical Association - 2005.
- Howard Dunne Memorial Award for Outstanding Service to the Swine Industry - 2006.
