= Carl Slee =

Welsh footballer

Personal information
- Full name: Carl David Slee
- Date of birth: 30 November 1947 (age 78)
- Place of birth: Swansea, Wales
- Position: Defender

Senior career*
| Years | Team | Apps | (Gls) |
| 1967–1971 | Swansea Town | 119 | (0) |
- Merthyr Tydfil
- * Club domestic league appearances and goals

Carl David Slee (born 30 November 1947) is a Welsh former footballer who played in the Football League for Swansea Town.
