= Harry C. J. Phillips =

Australian academic

Harry C. J. Phillips, AM, FACE (born Subiaco, 2 February 1943 – 17 May 2026), was a leading political and civic education advocate and political commentator in Western Australia. He had extensive teaching and lecturing experience in primary, secondary and tertiary institutions in political and civic education and has published widely in these fields, as well as sport, particularly tennis. Phillips's commitment to civics stems from his youth at Hyden Primary School, and his Alma Mater, Hale School.

== Career ==
Phillips was an honorary professor at Edith Cowan University and an adjunct professor at Curtin University in Western Australia. He was also a Parliamentary Fellow (Education) at the Parliament of Western Australia and was a Fellow of the Australian College of Educators (FACE). He held a Bachelor of Arts from the University of Western Australia and Curtin University and a Master of Arts and PhD in political science from the University of Western Ontario in London, Ontario, Canada. He had a Teachers' Certificate from Graylands Teachers College and a Teachers' Higher Certificate from the Education Department of Western Australia.

Following more than 30 years as a lecturer at Edith Cowan University an inscription was placed in the University path of honour which reads:

Dr Harry C. J. Phillips, ‘An inspirational lecturer and mentor: Respected political commentator; Your wisdom and kindness lives on in us.’

In October 2013, Phillips was awarded the prestigious Australian College of Educators State Medal for Western Australia in recognition of an 'outstanding contribution to education'.

Phillips was a member of advisory boards and committees including the Constitutional Centre of Western Australia, and Chair of the Constitutional Centre’s Civics and Citizenship Reference Group for Civic Education Agencies in Western Australia. The agencies included the Western Australian Parliament, the Western Australian Electoral Commission and the Francis Burt Legal Education Centre. He was a member of the Post-Compulsory Education Politics and Law Course Study Assessment, Review and Moderation Panel for the School Curriculum and Standards Authority (with membership of the Politics and Law Course Committees for the previous Board of Secondary Education and the Curriculum Council). In 2009 he was presented with a Certificate of Recognition

for making an outstanding contribution to the Curriculum Council as Chief Examiner, Chief Marker and Syllabus committee member in Political and Legal Studies for more than 30 years.

At the Parliament of Western Australia he was a member of the Parliamentary History Advisory Committee and the Parliamentary Education Advisory Committee. In 2012 Phillips was a member of the Australian Curriculum Assessment Reporting Authority (ACARA) Advisory Panel for the National Curriculum 'Shape Paper in Civics and Citizenship'. In 2013 he was subsequently made a Member of the ACARA Advisory Committee for the formulation of the National Curriculum in Civics and Citizenship.

Phillips also had strong links with sport in Western Australia. He played some A grade cricket for the Subiaco Cricket Club and three league games for the Subiaco Football Club, for which he had been a Vice Patron. His association with tennis was extensive. In 1995 he received a Grand Slam Award for services to Tennis West. In 2013 he had a tennis court named after him at his home Reabold Tennis Club with the inscription

in recognition and appreciation of his dedication and expertise in researching and documenting the history of both Reabold Tennis Club and Tennis West.

== Personal life ==
Phillips was married to Jan Phillips, a pre-primary teacher at Penrhos College for 23 years. His oldest daughter Michelle has two children, Alexander and Charlotte, and his youngest daughter Marina has two children, Harry and Poppy, with husband Adam. Phillips died on 17 May 2026. A memorial service was held on Friday 29 May 2026 at the Chapel of St Mark, Hale School.

== Publications ==
Phillips published mainly on political topics, with a focus on parliament and electoral matters, and political and civic education. He also wrote on sport, with particular focus on Western Australia. Selected publications are:

- Phillips, H (2017), Parliamentary Committees in the Western Australian Parliament: an overview of their evolution, functions and features - Volume 1: 1879-2000. Perth, Parliament of Western Australia, 2017
- Phillips, H. (2017) Michael Eamon Beahan, Noel Ashley Crichton-Browne, John Gordon Evans, Allan Charles Rocher, in The Biographical Dictionary of the Australian Senate, vol 4, 1983-2002. Canberra, Department of the Senate, 2017
- Phillips, H. (2015), A Citizens Guide to the Western Australian Parliament, fifth edition, Perth: Parliament of Western Australia.
- Phillips, H with Kerr, L (2013), The March 2013 Western Australian election: first fixed election date delivers a resounding victory for the Barnett government, (Australasian Parliamentary Review Vol.28, No. 2, Spring 2013, pp. 106–119)
- Phillips, H. (2013), Electoral Law in the State of Western Australia: An Overview, second edition, Perth: Western Australian Electoral Commission.
- Phillips, H. (2013), The Reabold Tennis Club: A Chronicle of Its First Half Century Since 1956, Perth: Reabold Tennis Club.
- Phillips, H. (2012), Proportional Representation in Western Australia: Its Principles, History, Outcomes and Education, Perth: Western Australian Electoral Commission.
- Phillips, H. with Black, D.+ (2012) Making a Difference-A Frontier of Firsts Woman in the Western Australian Parliament, 1921–2012, Perth: Parliament of Western Australia.
- Phillips, H. (2009), The 2008 Western Australian State Election: The Snap Poll Blunder, (Australasian Parliamentary Review, Vol. 24, No.1, Spring, pp. 226–242.)
- Phillips, H (2009), The Constitutional Centre of Western Australia: its foundation, Perth: Constitutional Centre of Western Australia
- Phillips, H. (2008), Electoral law in the State of Western Australia: an Overview, Perth: Western Australian Electoral Commission.
- Phillips, H., with Pendal, P+. and Black, D (2007), Parliament: Mirror of the People, Members of the Parliament of Western Australia, 1890–2007, Perth: Parliament of Western Australia.
- Phillips, H. with the assistance of K. Robinson (2006), The Quest for ‘One Vote One Value’ In Western Australia’s Political History, Perth: Western Australian Electoral Commission.
- Phillips, H with Black D. (2005), Geoff Gallop: A New Generation Labor Man, in John Wanna and Paul Williams (eds), Yes Premier: Labor Leadership in Australia’s States and Territories, Sydney: University of New South Wales Press, pp. 114–142
- Phillips, H. (2004), Speakers and presidents of the Parliament of Western Australia, Perth: Parliament of Western Australia.
- Phillips, H (2004), The Canadian Provincial Integrity Commissioner: An Assessment for Adoption in Australian States, (Australasian Parliamentary Review, Vol. 19, No.1, pp. 125–138.)
- Phillips, H with Black+, D. (2000), Making a Difference: Women in the Western Australian Parliament 1921–1999, Perth: Parliament of Western Australia.
- Phillips, H. (2001), Compulsory Voting: The Australian Experiment, Perth: Western Australian Electoral Commission.
- Phillips, H. with Beresford, Q+., Bekle, H., and Mulcock, J. (2001), The Salinity Crisis: Landscapes, Communities and Politics, Crawley: University of Western Australia Press.
- Phillips, H. (2000), "Women in Western Australian Parliament 1921–1999: Towards a New Parliamentary Politics", (International Review of Women and Leadership, Vol. 6, No. 1, July, pp. 24–37.)
- Phillips, H. (1999), "Citizenship: An Historical Overview", (The Social Educator, Vol. 19, No. 1, April, pp. 41–47.)
- Phillips, H. and Black, D+ (1999),"A Bicameral Case Study: The 1998 Western Australian Abortion Legislation", (Legislative Studies, Vol. 13, No.2, Autumn, pp. 7–29.)
- Phillips, H., Black, D, Bott, B and Fischer, T. (1998), Representing the People: Parliamentary Government in Western Australia, Fremantle Arts Centre Press.
- Phillips, H. (1997), ‘Tennis West: Conservatism in the Cinderella West’, in Ed. Jaggard and J. Ryan (eds), Perspectives on Sport and Society, (Studies in Western Australian History, Vol. 17, pp. 95–100.)
- Phillips, H. (1996), The Voice of Edith Cowan: Australia’s First Woman Parliamentarian, Perth: Edith Cowan University.
- Phillips, H (1996), with Beresford, Q. and McMaster, L., Conflict and Consensus: Australian Politics and Law, Melbourne: Longmans.
- Phillips, H. and Moroz, W. (1996), ‘Research findings on students’ perceptions of political awareness and the characteristics of a good citizen’, (Youth Studies, Vol. 15, No. 1, March, pp. 13–19.)
- Phillips, H. with Brogan, M.+ (Eds) (1995), Past as Prologue: Royal Commission into Commercial Activities of Government and Other Matters: Proceedings from the Conference on the Part 11 Report of the Royal Commission and Reform of Government in Western Australia, Mount Lawley: SASTEC.
- Phillips, H (1995), ‘The Ideals of Citizenship: Perceptions of Western Australian Youth’, in Murray Print (ed), Civics and Citizenship Education: Issues From Practice and Research, Belconnen: Australian Curriculum Studies Association, 19–38.
- Phillips, H. (1995), Tennis West: A History of the Western Australian Lawn Tennis Association from the 1890s to the 1990s, Sydney: Playwright Publishing.
- Phillips, H (1991), ‘The Modern Parliament’, in David Black (ed), The House on the Hill, A History of the Parliament of Western Australia, 1832–1990, Perth: Parliament of Western Australia, 185–262.
- Phillips, H (1991), Second Reading: Parliamentary Government in Western Australia, revised edition, Perth Ministry for Education. 2014 Internet Update.
- Phillips, H. (1985), ‘The Political Contest’, in The Other Side: Themes and Issues in Western Australian History, Perth: Bookland, pp. 87–103.
- Phillips, H and Reilly, C (1982), Key Concepts in Politics, Melbourne, Thomas Nelson.
- Phillips, H. (1980), 'The Political Participation Ethic and the Compulsory Vote', (Social Sciences Forum, Vol. 6 (1), pp. 1 –14.)
- Phillips, H. (1997), 'The Education Power in Canada', (The Australian Journal of Teacher Education, Vol. 2 (2), pp. 26–37.)
- The following entries in Jenny Gregory; Janice Gothard, eds. (2009). Historical Encyclopedia of Western Australia (PDF). Crawley: UWA Publishing. ISBN 978-1-921401-15-2. OCLC 405500003. OL 45266821M. Wikidata Q5773872.
1. Constitutional Centre of Western Australia, p. 232
2. Electoral system, pp. 315–316
3. Royal Commissions, pp. 779–780
4. Tennis, pp. 863–865
5. Wheatbelt, pp. 929–931
- Entries in the Oxford Companion to Australian Sport (1994), second edition Melbourne: Oxford University Press, Entries revised; Esme Boyd, Pat Cash, Ashley Cooper, Margaret Court (Smith), Jack Crawford, Neale Fraser, Lew Hoad, Harry Hopman, Hopman-Hoad Towel Incident, Hopman Cup, Rod Laver, Jan Lehane (O'Neil), Peter McNamera, Paul McNamee, Memorial Drive Tennis Club, John Newcombe, Tennis: Elite Players Since 1930, Tennis: Open Championships before 1930, Tennis: Open Championships, Lesley Turner, Veteran's Tennis, Nancy Wynne (Bolton). Additional for second edition; John Alexander, Bill Bowrey, Mary Carter, Judy Dalton (Teggart), John Fitzgerald, Joan Hartigan, Thelma Long (Coyne), Ken McGregor, Beryl Penrose, Fred Stolle, Horrie Rice, Mervyn Rose, Elizabeth Smylie (Sayers) and Wendy Turnbull.
- Entries in the Oxford Companion to Australian Cricket (1996), Melbourne: Oxford University Press. Entries Ian Brayshaw, Derek Chadwick, John 'Sam' Gannon, Desmond Hoare, John Inverarity, Ernest Parker and Keith Slater.
- Bi-annual Political Chronicles for Western Australia, for The Australian Journal of Politics and History, from 1992, and earlier selected issues. Co-authored with David Black from 1992 until 2003 and with Liz Kerr from 2004 to 2018.

== General references ==
- Pearce, Suzannah, ed. (2007). Who's who in Western Australia (Inaugural ed.). North Melbourne: Crown Content. pp. 607–608. ISBN 978-1-74095-154-8. ISSN 1834-836X.
