= Glyn Davies (footballer, born 1909) =

Welsh footballer

Personal information
- Full name: Glyn Ivor Davies
- Date of birth: 24 November 1909
- Place of birth: Swansea, Wales
- Date of death: 1985 (aged 75–76)
- Position: Outside left

Senior career*
Years	Team	Apps	(Gls)
1929–1932	Swansea Town	3	(0)
1929–1930	Bristol University		
1930–1933	Casuals	60	(7)
1931	Bedouins	1	(0)
1933	Brentford		
1934–1935	Norwich City	3	(0)

International career
1928–1935	Wales Amateurs	10	(1)
- * Club domestic league appearances and goals

Glyn Ivor Davies (24 November 1909 – 1985) was a Welsh amateur footballer who played in the Football League for Swansea Town and Norwich City as an outside left. He was capped by Wales at amateur level.
