= James Collins (nutritionist) =

James Nicholas Collins (born 1981) is a sports nutritionist, author, strategist and commentator. He is best known for his former role as Head of Nutrition at Arsenal Football Club.

== Current work ==
He is the founder and managing director of INTRA Performance Group, an international consultancy working with elite performers and organisations in elite sport and entertainment, including Chelsea Football Club. He was a project lead for the UEFA Expert Group Statement on Nutrition in Elite Football, bringing together an international team of 31 researchers and practitioners to deliver the best-practice guidelines within football. This landmark process included Arsène Wenger delivering ‘The Coaches Perspective on Nutrition’. Collins was commissioned by FIFA to deliver a masterclass on the evolution of nutrition in world football within its expert knowledge centre.

== Elite football ==
Collins worked as a consultant for France national football team for their 2018 FIFA World Cup winning campaign and in 2014, worked as part of the backroom staff of the England national football team for the 2014 FIFA World Cup in Brazil. He was responsible for players hydration, dietary needs and supplementation. He worked as Head Nutritionist at Arsenal Football Club for seven seasons from 2010–17, developing the club’s first nutrition service.

== Public commentary ==
Collins has been actively involved in transferring best-practices from elite sport to improve the health and wellbeing of the general public. He is author of the book ‘The Energy Plan’ (Penguin Random House) and narrator of the audio book, translating sports nutrition from the elite sport to the general public.

He was formally elected President of The Royal Society of Medicine’s Food and Health Forum, organising educational meetings for UK health practitioners. Collins has also served as a columnist for The Telegraph and BBC, worked on the 2018 Sport Relief challenge and interviewed on many prominent health and performance broadcasts, including the High Performance Podcast.

== Early career ==
After studying in the USA, he returned to complete undergraduate and postgraduate degrees at Loughborough University. He then joined the English Institute of Sport working with UK Athletics. He worked with Team GB athletes at the Beijing 2008, London 2012 and Rio 2016 Olympic Games.
