= Tania Sorrell =

Australian infectious disease physician

Professor Tania Sorrell AM FAHMS
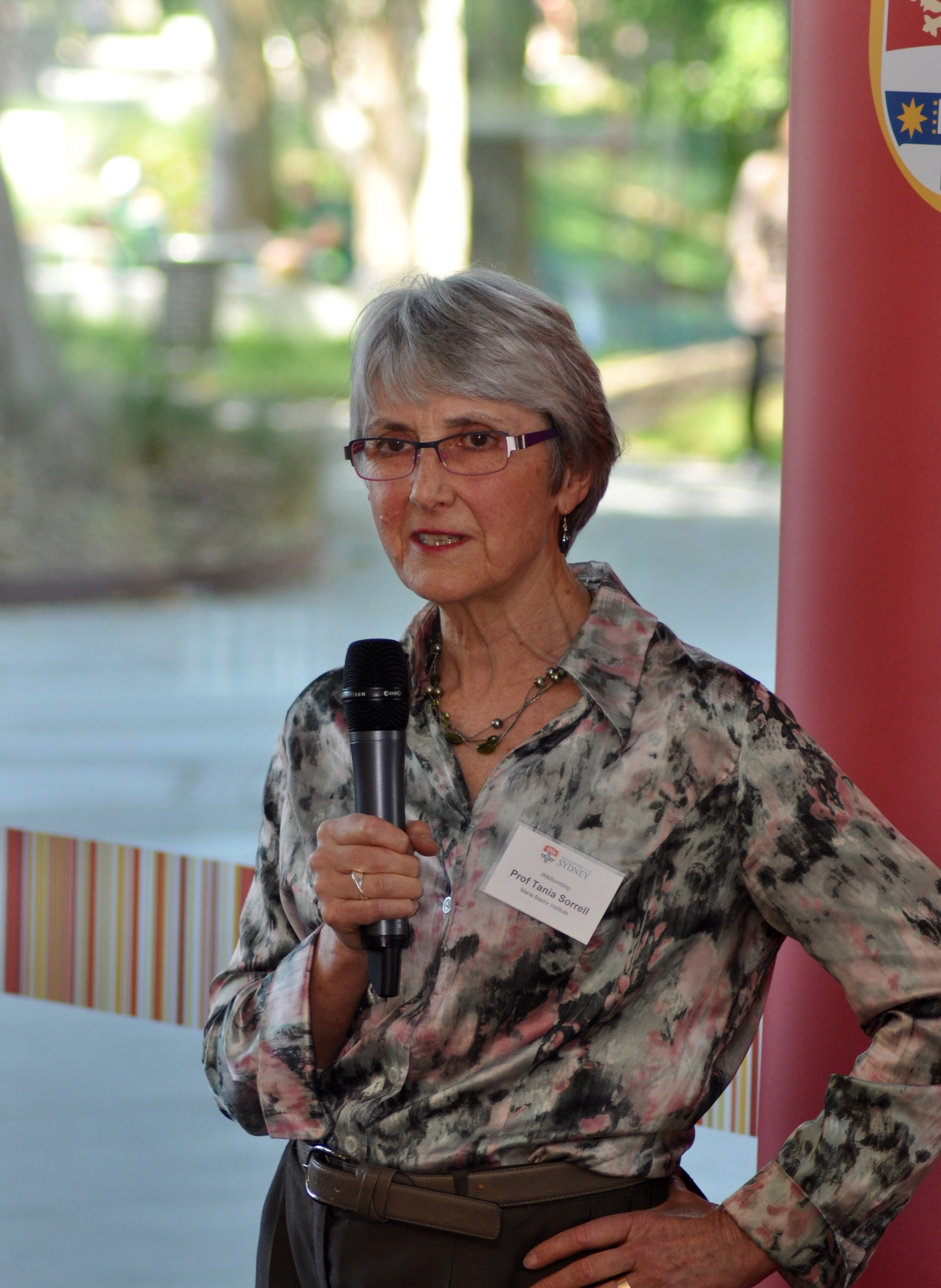
- Born: 6 March 1947 (age 79)
- Education: University of Adelaide
- Scientific career
- Workplaces: University of Sydney
- Thesis: Anticonvulsant drugs in immunosuppression and carcinogenesis (1974)

Tania Sorrell (born 6 March 1947) is an Australian infectious disease physician. She is a Professor and Director of the Marie Bashir Institute for Infectious Diseases and Biosecurity at the University of Sydney. She serves as Chair of the National Health and Medical Research Council Research Translation Faculty Steering Group on New and Emerging Health Threats. She is interested in the diagnosis, prevention and treatment of infectious diseases.

== Early life and education ==
Sorrell studied medicine at the University of Adelaide. She earned her undergraduate and graduate degrees in Adelaide, where she studied anticonvulsant drugs in immunosuppression. She moved to the University of California, first supported by a Fulbright-Hays award and then as a postdoctoral fellow.

== Research and career ==
Sorrell studies the pathogenesis of invasive fungal infections, drug discovery and translational research. She joined the faculty at the University of Sydney in 1985. She has focused her career on the fungi Cryptococcus. She has studied the virulence determinants in Cryptococcus neoformans in an effort to identify novel treatments and rapid diagnostics tests. These treatments include new classes of antifungals. She has designed a novel PCR platform for the rapid screening of DNA and RNA from up to 70 micro-organisms at the same time, which can speed up clinical diagnostics. Beyond Cryptococcus, Sorrell is interested in the emergence of resistant microorganisms.

Sorrell helped to establish the University of Sydney's Marie Bashir Institute for Infectious Diseases and Biosecurity.

== Awards and honours ==
Sorrell served as President of the Australasian Society for Infectious Diseases in 1989. She is senior advisor for the Global Action Fund for Fungal Infections. She was awarded a Member of the Order of Australia in 2014. She is a Fellow of the Australian Academy of Health and Medical Sciences.

== Selected publications ==
- Ben De Pauw; Thomas J Walsh; J Peter Donnelly; et al. (1 June 2008). "Revised definitions of invasive fungal disease from the European Organization for Research and Treatment of Cancer/Invasive Fungal Infections Cooperative Group and the National Institute of Allergy and Infectious Diseases Mycoses Study Group (EORTC/". Clinical Infectious Diseases. 46 (12): 1813–1821. doi:10.1086/588660. ISSN 1058-4838. PMC 2671227. PMID 18462102. Wikidata Q37164067.
- John R Perfect; William E Dismukes; Francoise Dromer; et al. (1 February 2010). "Clinical practice guidelines for the management of cryptococcal disease: 2010 update by the infectious diseases society of america". Clinical Infectious Diseases. 50 (3): 291–322. doi:10.1086/649858. ISSN 1058-4838. PMC 5826644. PMID 20047480. Wikidata Q34020746.
- J Peter Donnelly; Sharon C Chen; Carol A Kauffman; et al. (5 December 2019). "Revision and Update of the Consensus Definitions of Invasive Fungal Disease From the European Organization for Research and Treatment of Cancer and the Mycoses Study Group Education and Research Consortium". Clinical Infectious Diseases. doi:10.1093/cid/ciz1008. ISSN 1058-4838. PMID 31802125. Wikidata Q91699004.
