= Joe Lloyd (footballer) =

Welsh footballer

Personal information
- Full name: Joseph Millington Lloyd
- Date of birth: 30 September 1910
- Place of birth: Connah's Quay, Wales
- Date of death: 1 April 1996 (aged 85)
- Place of death: Shotton, Wales
- Height: 5 ft 8 in (1.73 m)
- Position: Left-half

Senior career*
Years	Team	Apps	(Gls)
- Connah's Quay & Shotton United
1931–1932	Everton	0	(0)
1932–1939	Swansea City	211	(1)
1946–1947	Wrexham	20	(0)
- * Club domestic league appearances and goals

Joseph Millington Lloyd (30 September 1910 – 1 April 1996) was a Welsh professional footballer who played as a left-half. He made appearances in the English Football League with Welsh clubs Swansea City and Wrexham.

He retired in 1947 after his one-year spell at Wrexham.
