= William Brown (footballer, born 1889) =

Scottish footballer

Personal information
- Full name: William Pairman Brown
- Date of birth: 1 August 1889
- Place of birth: Blantyre, Scotland
- Positions: Inside forward; half back

Senior career*
Years	Team	Apps	(Gls)
1910–1913	Queen's Park	11	(2)
1913–1914	Motherwell	4	(0)
1917	Dunfermline Athletic		
1918	Heart of Midlothian	1	(0)
–1919	St Bernard's		
1919–	Raith Rovers		
1920	→ St Bernard's (loan)		
–1923	Arbroath Athletic		
1923	Dunfermline Athletic	1	(0)
- * Club domestic league appearances and goals

William Pairman Brown was a Scottish amateur footballer who played in the Scottish League for Queen's Park as an inside forward.

== Personal life ==
Brown served as a sergeant in the Highland Light Infantry during the First World War and was later commissioned into the Argyll and Sutherland Highlanders as a lieutenant. He was wounded during the course of his service.

== Career statistics ==
Appearances and goals by club, season and competition
Club	Season	League			Scottish Cup		Total	
Club	Season	Division	Apps	Goals	Apps	Goals	Apps	Goals
Queen's Park	1909–10	Scottish Division One	4	0	0	0	4	0
Queen's Park	1910–11	Scottish Division One	4	0	0	0	4	0
Queen's Park	1912–13	Scottish Division One	3	2	0	0	3	2
Queen's Park	Total		11	2	0	0	11	2
Motherwell	1913–14	Scottish Division One	4	0	0	0	4	0
Heart of Midlothian	1918–19	Scottish Division One	1	0	—		1	0
Dunfermline Athletic	1923–24	Scottish Division Two	1	0	0	0	1	0
Career total			17	2	0	0	17	2
