= James Collins (priest) =

Irish Anglican priest

James Collins (5 February 1801 – 19 June 1868) was an Anglican priest in Ireland during the 19th century.

Collins was born in County Louth and educated at Trinity College, Dublin. He was the incumbent at Denn, County Cavan and Dean of Killala from 1844 until his death.
