= Wilfred Milne =

English footballer

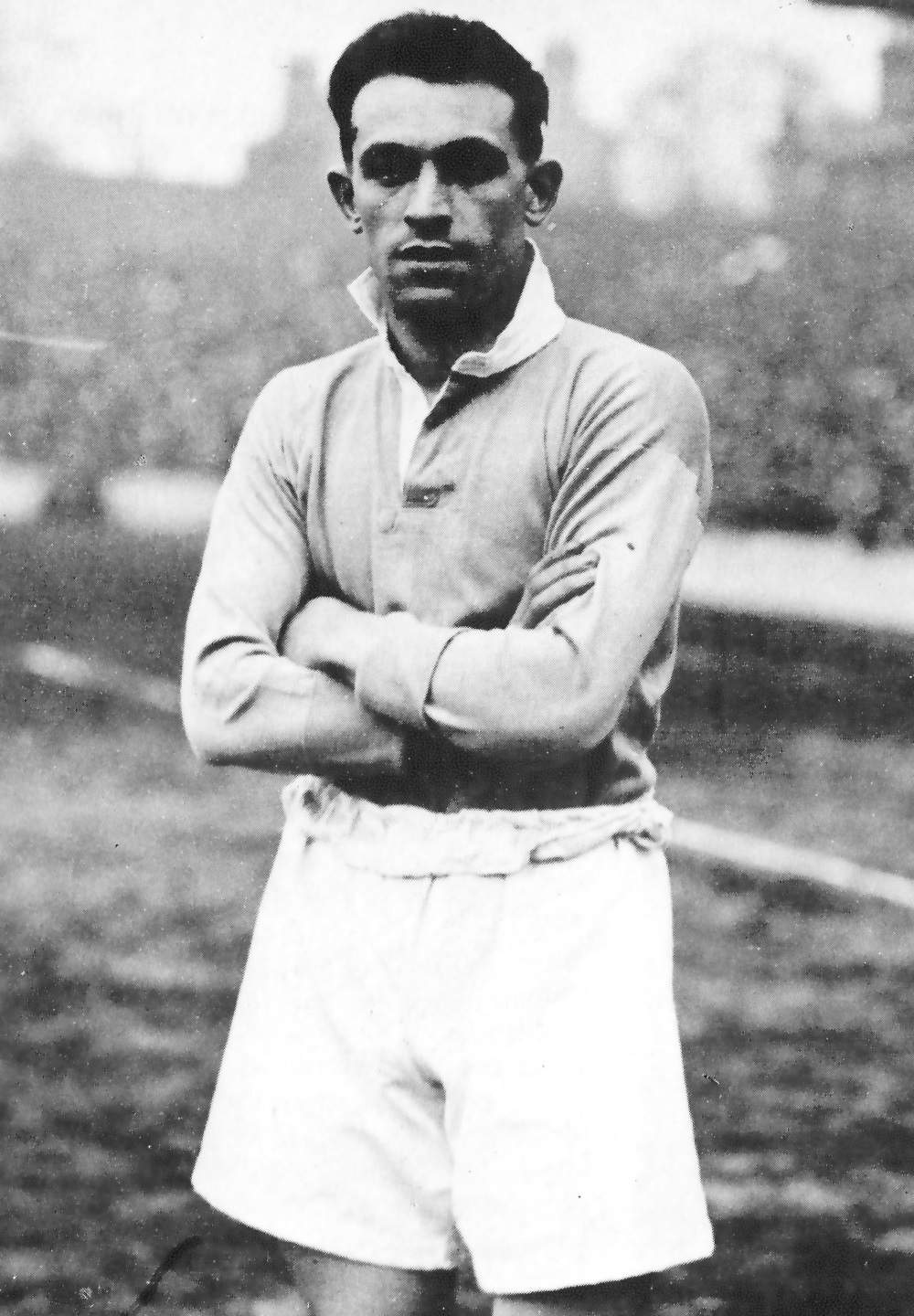
- Portrait of Wilfred Milne

Personal information
- Date of birth: 24 March 1899
- Place of birth: Hebburn-on-Tyne, England
- Date of death: 29 November 1977 (aged 78)
- Place of death: Swansea, Wales
- Height: 5 ft 7 in (1.70 m)
- Position: Full back

Senior career*
Years	Team	Apps	(Gls)
1920–1937	Swansea Town	586	(7)
- * Club domestic league appearances and goals

Wilfred Milne (24 March 1899 – 29 November 1977) was an English professional footballer. A one-club man, Milne spent his entire professional career with Swansea Town where he holds the club record for most appearances in the Football League.

== Career ==
After winning the Northumberland Senior Cup, Milne signed for Swansea Town in May 1920 from local junior side Walker Celtic for the price of a fish tea and a cup of tea (2/9d). Manchester United and West Ham United were also interested in the player at the time. He did not play in the clubs' first game in the Football League at Portsmouth, but six games later replaced the injured William Ogley at left back. He became the clubs' first choice left back for the next sixteen seasons, making at least 30 league appearances in thirteen of those seasons, and was ever present in the 1930–31 season.

Milne scored his first Swansea goal on his 501st appearance for the club, a penalty, and went on to score a further six goals. His final two appearances for Swansea came in the 1936–37 season as an emergency goalkeeper, replacing the injured Stan Moore for games against Leicester City and Nottingham Forest. At the age of 38 he was released at the end of that season, and joined Milford United as player-manager, but returned to Swansea after just half a season.He died in Swansea in November 1977.

Milne played a total of 586 league games while at Swansea, which is a record to this day, while only two other players have managed to top 500. Roger Freestone made more appearances in all competitions for the Swans, though Freestone played in a number of competitions that did not exist in Milne's day, notably the Football League Cup, Football League Trophy, European Cup Winners' Cup and the Football League play-offs.
