= Glen M. Davis =

Australian scientist

- Born: January 30, 1952 (age 74); Castor, Alberta, Canada
- Awards: OAM, FACSM

Academic background
- Education: University of Toronto (PhD), University of Western Ontario (MA), University of Ottawa (BPE)

Academic work
- Discipline: Exercise therapy
- Institutions: University of Sydney
- Doctoral students: Sirous Ahmadi

Glen Macartney Davis OAM (born January 30, 1952) is an Australian-Canadian scientist who is Professor of Clinical Exercise Sciences at the University of Sydney.

== Career ==
Davis received his undergraduate and post-graduate education in Canada, with his Ph.D. degree being conferred at the University of Toronto in 1986. Davis is a member of several international scientific societies including a Fellow of the American College of Sports Medicine and Vice President of the International Functional Electrical Stimulation Society. Since 1985, he has conducted a variety of invited workshops, lectures and symposia with international scope in his research area of Exercise Therapy in Special Populations. In addition, he has published 15 book chapters, over 68 peer-reviewed articles and more than 76 research abstracts or abbreviated communications in proceedings of scientific meetings. Traditionally, Davis has maintained a strong research and clinical interest in:

- Electrical stimulation-induced walking and exercise of the lower-limbs of spinally-injured and stroke patients
- The combined use of exercise therapies and biomedical technology for patient rehabilitation.

Since 2000, Davis has been Principal/Chief Investigator on research grants exceeding $A4.39M including current Australian NHMRC and NSW Program Grant funding.
