= Jamie Collins (footballer, born 1978) =

English footballer

James Collins
Personal information
- Date of birth: 28 May 1978 (age 48)
- Place of birth: Liverpool, England
- Position: Midfielder

Senior career*
Years	Team	Apps	(Gls)
1997–2001	Crewe Alexandra	24	(1)
1997–1998	→ Northwich Victoria (loan)	3	(3)
1999	→ Kidderminster Harriers (loan)	5	(0)
2001	→ Halesowen (loan)		
2001–2002	Northwich Victoria	17	(0)
Total		49+	(4+)

Managerial career
- 2014–2015: Crewe Alexandra U23
- 2015–2017: Crewe Alexandra (assistant)
- 2020–2026: Wolverhampton Wanderers U23
- 2025: Wolverhampton Wanderers (interim)
- * Club domestic league appearances and goals

James Collins (born 28 May 1978) is an English former professional footballer and manager, he was recently the head coach of the Wolverhampton Wanderers U23's.

Collins holds the UEFA Pro licence, UEFA - A licence and is one of 16 selected coaches to graduate on the Level 5 elite coaches award.

Collins made his Crewe debut in a 3–3 draw at Bury on 26 August 1997, and just over a year later scored his first Crewe goal in a 2–1 win over Bradford City on 28 August 1998.
