= Jimmy Collins (footballer, born 1895) =

Scottish footballer

Personal information
- Full name: James Collins
- Date of birth: 1895
- Place of birth: Dundee, Scotland
- Position: Wing-half

Senior career*
Years	Team	Apps	(Gls)
1919–1920	Lochee Harp		
1920–1930	Swansea Town	275	(9)
Total		275	(9)
- * Club domestic league appearances and goals

James Collins (1895–unknown) was a Scottish footballer who played in the Football League for Swansea Town.
