= 2001–02 Swansea City A.F.C. season =

Swansea City
2001–02 season
- Manager: John Hollins (until 12 September); Colin Addison (from 13 September until 7 March); Nick Cusack and Roger Freestone (joint caretakers from 8 March until April 20); Nick Cusack (sole caretaker from 20 April)
- Stadium: Vetch Field
- Third Division: 20th
- FA Cup: Second round
- League Cup: First round
- Football League Trophy: First round
- FAW Premier Cup: Runners-up
- Top goalscorer: League: Steve Watkin; All: Steve Watkin (11)

During the 2001–02 English football season, Swansea City competed in the Third Division.

== Season summary ==
In July, the club was sold to managing director Mike Lewis for £1. Lewis subsequently sold on his stake to a consortium of Australian businessmen behind the Brisbane Lions AFL team, fronted by Tony Petty. Seven players were sacked and eight others saw their contracts terminated, angering supporters. Sanctions were threatened by the Football League, with a rival consortium headed by ex-player Mel Nurse seeking to buy out the new owners. During this period, manager John Hollins was sacked after a poor start to the season, and Colin Addison took over as manager. The turmoil led to the creation of the Swansea City Supporters' Trust, which sought to save the club and ultimately guarantee supporter representation on the club's board.

The Petty group sold its stake in January 2002 after a bitter stand-off with the Nurse consortium, which was supported by the majority of the club's fans. Jim Moore and Mel Griffin, previously rescuers of Hull City, stepped into the breach and persuaded Petty to sell to them (as he had promised to bankrupt the club & make it extinct rather than sell to Nurse). From there Moore became chairman for three weeks, giving the Nurse consortium time to organize its finances. Having successfully reorganized the finances of Hull City, both Moore and Griffin were believers in clubs belonging in the hands of local people, and so, believing Nurse's group were best for the Swans, the two sold the club to Nurse's consortium for £1.

Despite problems off the pitch, the team had managed a mid-table position, but lack of funds led to Addison's dismissal in early March, and under caretakers Nick Cusack and Roger Freestone the club slumped to a 20th placed-finish.

== Kit ==
Swansea City's kit was manufactured by Bergoni and sponsored by The Travel House.

== First-team squad ==
Squad at end of season

Note: Flags indicate national team as defined under FIFA eligibility rules; some limited exceptions apply. Players may hold more than one non-FIFA nationality.

No.	Pos.	Nation	Player
1	GK	WAL	Roger Freestone
2	DF	WAL	Lee Jenkins
3	DF	ENG	Michael Howard
4	MF	ENG	Nick Cusack
5	DF	ENG	Jason Smith
8	MF	FRA	David Romo
9	FW	ENG	John Williams
10	FW	WAL	Steve Watkin
11	MF	WAL	Jonathan Coates
12	MF	WAL	Gareth Phillips
13	GK	WAL	Jason Jones
14	MF	WAL	Kristian O'Leary
15	MF	WAL	Damien Lacey
16	MF	ENG	Michael Keegan

No.	Pos.	Nation	Player
17	FW	MLI	Mamady Sidibé
18	DF	WAL	Chris Todd
19	DF	IRL	Ryan Casey (Note: Casey was born in Coventry, England, but also qualified to represent the Republic of Ireland internationally and represented them at U-18 level.)
20	DF	WAL	Leigh De-Vulgt
21	DF	WAL	Stephen Healey
22	MF	WAL	Chris O'Sullivan
23	MF	WAL	Craig Draper
25	MF	WAL	Andrew Mumford
26	DF	SCO	Jered Stirling
27	DF	ENG	Neil Sharp
28	DF	WAL	Terry Evans
30	FW	ENG	Steve Brodie
31	DF	WAL	Richard Duffy

=== Left club during season ===
Note: Flags indicate national team as defined under FIFA eligibility rules; some limited exceptions apply. Players may hold more than one non-FIFA nationality.

No.	Pos.	Nation	Player
6	DF	ENG	Matthew Bound (to Oxford United)
7	MF	ARG	Nicolás Mazzina (released)
24	FW	ENG	Nathan Tyson (on loan from Reading)
26	DF	ENG	Richard Appleby (to Kidderminster Harriers)

No.	Pos.	Nation	Player
27	MF	WAL	Stuart Roberts (to Wycombe Wanderers)
28	GK	WAL	Simon Cole (released)
29	DF	WAL	Stephen Evans (on loan from Crystal Palace)
