= 2000–01 Swansea City A.F.C. season =

Swansea City
2000–01 season
- Manager: John Hollins
- Stadium: Vetch Field
- Football League Second Division: 23rd
- FA Cup: First round
- League Cup: First round
- League Trophy: Quarter Final

The 2000–01 season saw Swansea City compete in the Football League Second Division where they finished in 23rd position with 37 points and were relegated to the Third Division.

== Final league table ==
Pos	Team	Pld	W	D	L	GF	GA	GD	Pts	Qualification or relegation
20	Swindon Town	46	13	13	20	47	65	−18	52	
21	Bristol Rovers (R)	46	12	15	19	53	57	−4	51	Relegation to Football League Third Division
22	Luton Town (R)	46	9	13	24	52	80	−28	40	Relegation to Football League Third Division
23	Swansea City (R)	46	8	13	25	47	73	−26	37	Relegation to Football League Third Division
24	Oxford United (R)	46	7	6	33	53	100	−47	27	Relegation to Football League Third Division

Rules for classification: 1) Points; 2) Goal difference; 3) Goals scored
(R) Relegated

== Results ==
Swansea City's score comes first

=== Legend ===
Win	Draw	Loss

=== Football League Second Division ===
Match	Date	Opponent	Venue	Result	Attendance	Scorers
1	12 August 2000	Wigan Athletic	H	0–0	8,391	
2	19 August 2000	Brentford	A	0–0	5,039	
3	26 August 2000	Colchester United	H	0–2	6,247	
4	28 August 2000	Peterborough United	A	2–0	6,428	Bound, Price
5	9 September 2000	Millwall	A	0–1	9,550	
6	12 September 2000	Notts County	A	1–0	3,395	Thomas
7	16 September 2000	Luton Town	H	4–0	6,011	Bound, Boyd, Cusack, Roberts
8	23 September 2000	Reading	A	1–5	11,003	Watkin
9	30 September 2000	Bury	H	0–2	5,362	
10	14 October 2000	Stoke City	H	2–1	6,498	Savarese (2)
11	17 October 2000	Swindon Town	H	0–0	6,333	
12	21 October 2000	Wrexham	A	0–1	4,008	
13	24 October 2000	Rotherham United	A	2–4	3,892	Watkin, Bound
14	28 October 2000	Port Vale	H	0–1	3,715	
15	31 October 2000	Bristol City	H	2–2	5,286	Savarese (2)
16	4 November 2000	Oldham Athletic	A	1–1	4,282	Smith
17	11 November 2000	Oxford United	H	1–2	4,892	Watkin
18	25 November 2000	Cambridge United	A	3–3	3,269	Watkin, Savarese (2)
19	2 December 2000	Bristol Rovers	H	0–0	5,563	
20	16 December 2000	Bournemouth	A	0–2	3,738	
21	23 December 2000	Wycombe Wanderers	A	1–2	5,001	Roberts
22	26 December 2000	Walsall	H	3–1	5,795	Watkin, Savarese, Jones
23	6 January 2001	Wigan Athletic	A	0–2	5,571	
24	13 January 2001	Peterborough United	H	2–2	5,288	Savarese, Casey
25	20 January 2001	Walsall	A	1–5	5,227	Watkin
26	3 February 2001	Bristol City	A	1–3	10,379	Roberts
27	11 February 2001	Millwall	H	0–0	6,905	
28	17 February 2001	Luton Town	A	3–5	7,085	Savarese (3)
29	20 February 2001	Notts County	H	0–1	4,058	
30	24 February 2001	Reading	H	0–1	5,073	
31	27 February 2001	Northampton Town	A	1–2	4,361	Fabiano
32	3 March 2001	Bury	A	0–3	3,443	
33	7 March 2001	Stoke City	A	2–1	10,091	Price, O'Leary
34	10 March 2001	Northampton Town	H	1–1	4,911	Watkin
35	17 March 2001	Swindon Town	A	1–1	6,724	Roberts
36	31 March 2001	Bournemouth	H	0–3	4,013	
37	3 April 2001	Colchester United	A	0–3	2,886	
38	7 April 2001	Bristol Rovers	A	0–1	6,505	
39	10 April 2001	Wycombe Wanderers	H	3–1	3,010	Price, Boyd (2)
40	14 April 2001	Rotherham United	H	0–0	4,327	
41	16 April 2001	Port Vale	A	0–1	4,396	
42	21 April 2001	Oldham Athletic	H	1–2	3,261	Roberts
43	24 April 2001	Wrexham	H	0–1	2,665	
44	28 April 2001	Oxford United	A	1–3	4,148	Price
45	1 May 2001	Brentford	H	6–0	2,002	Verschave (2), O'Leary, Cusack, Coates, Todd
46	5 May 2001	Cambridge United	A	1–1	3,383	Verschave

=== FA Cup ===
Match	Date	Opponent	Venue	Result	Attendance	Scorers
R1	18 November 2000	Bournemouth	A	0–2	3,422	

=== Football League Cup ===
Match	Date	Opponent	Venue	Result	Attendance	Scorers
R1 1st leg	22 August 2000	West Bromwich Albion	H	0–0	4,758	
R1 2nd leg	6 September 2000	West Bromwich Albion	A	1–2	7,328	Bound

=== Football League Trophy ===
Match	Date	Opponent	Venue	Result	Attendance	Scorers
R1	9 January 2001	Bournemouth	H	1–0	3,810	Savarese
R2	30 January 2001	Reading	H	1–0	2,516	Savarese
QF	14 February 2001	Brentford	H	2–3	2,222	Lacey, Price

== Squad statistics ==
No.	Pos.	Name	League		FA Cup		League Cup		Other		Total	
No.	Pos.	Name	Apps	Goals	Apps	Goals	Apps	Goals	Apps	Goals	Apps	Goals
1	GK	(Wales) Roger Freestone	43	0	1	0	2	0	3	0	49	0
2	DF	(England) Steve Jones	13	1	1	0	0	0	0	0	14	1
3	DF	(England) Michael Howard	39(2)	0	1	0	2	0	2	0	44(2)	0
4	MF	(England) Nick Cusack	30(10)	2	1	0	1	0	0(1)	0	32(11)	2
5	MF	(England) Jason Smith	22	1	1	0	1	0	3	0	27	1
6	DF	(England) Matthew Bound	39(1)	3	1	0	2	1	0(1)	0	42(2)	4
7	MF	(England) Richard Appleby	0(5)	0	0	0	0	0	0	0	0(5)	0
8	MF	(England) Martin Thomas	12(9)	1	1	0	2	0	0	0	15(9)	1
9	FW	(Venezuela) Giovanni Savarese	28(3)	11	0(1)	0	0	0	3	2	31(4)	13
10	FW	(Wales) Steve Watkin	27(8)	7	1	0	2	0	0(1)	0	30(9)	7
11	MF	(Wales) Jonathan Coates	16(3)	1	0	0	1	0	0	0	17(3)	1
12	MF	(Wales) Gareth Phillips	9(6)	0	0	0	0	0	0	0	9(6)	0
13	GK	(Wales) Jason Jones	3	0	0	0	0	0	0	0	3	0
14	MF	(Wales) Kristian O'Leary	22(2)	2	0	0	2	0	3	0	27(2)	2
15	MF	(Wales) Damien Lacey	17(1)	0	0	0	0	0	3	1	20(1)	1
16	MF	(England) Tommy Mutton	3(2)	0	0	0	0(2)	0	0	0	3(4)	0
17	MF	(England) Stuart Roberts	21(15)	5	1	0	1(1)	0	3	0	26(16)	5
18	FW	(England) Jason Price	41	4	0	0	2	0	2	1	45	5
19	DF	(Republic of Ireland) Ryan Casey	3(6)	1	0(1)	0	0	0	0(1)	0	3(8)	1
20	MF	(Wales) Lee Jenkins	29(10)	0	1	0	1	0	2	0	33(10)	0
21	MF	(Wales) Andrew Mumford	2(4)	0	0	0	0	0	0	0	2(4)	0
23	MF	(Wales) Bari Morgan	0(5)	0	0	0	0	0	0	0	0(5)	0
25	MF	(Wales) Michael Keegan	4	0	0(1)	0	1(1)	0	2	0	7(2)	0
26	MF	(Wales) Leigh De-Vulgt	6(1)	0	0	0	0	0	2	0	8(1)	0
27	GK	(Wales) Carl Mounty	0	0	0	0	0	0	0(1)	0	0(1)	0
29	DF	(Wales) Chris Todd	11	1	0	0	0	0	0	0	11	1
30	DF	(France) David Romo	28(5)	0	1	0	0	0	3	0	32(5)	0
31	MF	(France) Nicolas Fabiano	12(4)	1	0	0	0	0	0	0	12(4)	1
32	FW	(France) Matthias Verschave	12	3	0	0	0	0	1	0	13	3
35	FW	(Jamaica) Walter Boyd	14(3)	3	0	0	2	0	1	0	17(3)	3
36	GK	(Wales) Alex Davies	0(1)	0	0	0	0	0	0	0	0(1)	0
