= 1998–99 Swansea City A.F.C. season =

Swansea City
1998–99 season
- Chairman: Steve Hamer
- Manager: John Hollins
- Stadium: Vetch Field
- Third Division: 7th
- FA Cup: Fourth round
- League Cup: First round
- Football League Trophy: Second round
- Top goalscorer: Watkin (17)
Home colours

During the 1998–99 English football season, Swansea City A.F.C. competed in the Football League Third Division.

== Season summary ==
In the summer of 1998, John Hollins was appointed as Swansea manager and things soon started to improve. In the 1998–99 season, the club reached the Third Division play-offs, only to lose in extra time at Scunthorpe United. The season was also notable for a third round FA Cup victory over Premiership opponents West Ham United, whose team included Frank Lampard, Joe Cole, Rio Ferdinand and John Hartson. Swansea thus became the first bottom division team to defeat a Premiership club in the FA Cup since the re-organisation of the league structure in 1992.

== Final league table ==
Pos	Team	Pld	W	D	L	GF	GA	GD	Pts	Promotion or relegation
5	Rotherham United	46	20	13	13	79	61	+18	73	Qualification for the Third Division play-offs
6	Leyton Orient	46	19	15	12	68	59	+9	72	Qualification for the Third Division play-offs
7	Swansea City	46	19	14	13	56	48	+8	71	Qualification for the Third Division play-offs
8	Mansfield Town	46	19	10	17	60	58	+2	67	
9	Peterborough United	46	18	12	16	72	56	+16	66	

Rules for classification: 1) Points; 2) Goals scored; 3) Goal difference

== Results ==
Swansea City's score comes first

=== Legend ===
Win	Draw	Loss

=== Football League Third Division ===
Date	Opponent	Venue	Result	Attendance	Scorers
8 August 1998	Exeter City	H	2–0	5,809	Thomas, Watkin
15 August 1998	Cambridge United	A	1–2	3,074	Casey
22 August 1998	Leyton Orient	H	1–1	4,629	Bird
29 August 1998	Mansfield Town	A	0–1	2,421	
31 August 1998	Scunthorpe United	H	1–2	4,024	Alsop
5 September 1998	Brighton & Hove Albion	A	0–1	2,931	
8 September 1998	Carlisle United	A	2–1	2,816	Howard, Watkin
12 September 1998	Scarborough	H	2–0	3,360	Watkin (pen), Price
19 September 1998	Torquay United	A	1–1	2,527	Smith
26 September 1998	Southend United	H	3–1	3,890	Alsop, Watkin, Bird
3 October 1998	Darlington	A	2–2	3,046	Watkin, Price
9 October 1998	Rotherham United	H	1–1	5,180	Thomas
17 October 1998	Chester City	A	1–1	3,926	Alsop
20 October 1998	Shrewsbury Town	A	0–1	2,328	
31 October 1998	Halifax Town	A	0–2	2,383	
7 November 1998	Peterborough United	H	0–0	3,771	
10 November 1998	Plymouth Argyle	A	2–1	4,517	Watkin, Alsop
22 November 1998	Cardiff City	H	2–1	7,757	Thomas, Bound
28 November 1998	Hartlepool United	A	2–1	2,051	Alsop (2)
12 December 1998	Rochdale	H	1–1	4,010	Alsop
19 December 1998	Hull City	A	2–0	4,280	Appleby, Watkin
26 December 1998	Leyton Orient	A	1–1	5,343	Alsop
28 December 1998	Barnet	H	2–1	6,514	Smith, Watkin
9 January 1999	Exeter City	A	0–4	3,213	
30 January 1999	Barnet	A	1–0	2,259	Appleby
5 February 1999	Brighton & Hove Albion	H	2–2	6,563	Jones, Watkin
13 February 1999	Carlisle United	H	1–1	4,753	Roberts
16 February 1999	Brentford	H	2–1	5,109	Appleby, Watkin
20 February 1999	Scarborough	A	1–2	1,512	Smith
23 February 1999	Mansfield Town	H	1–0	4,361	Alsop
27 February 1999	Torquay United	H	0–0	5,594	
6 March 1999	Southend United	A	0–2	3,713	
9 March 1999	Darlington	H	2–0	4,078	O'Leary, Watkin
13 March 1999	Peterborough United	A	1–0	4,182	Roberts
20 March 1999	Halifax Town	H	1–2	4,974	Cusack
23 March 1999	Scunthorpe United	A	2–1	3,631	Watkin (2)
3 April 1999	Chester City	H	1–1	5,994	Roberts
5 April 1999	Rotherham United	A	0–1	4,257	
9 April 1999	Shrewsbury Town	H	1–1	5,113	Bound
13 April 1999	Hartlepool United	H	1–0	4,429	Smith
18 April 1999	Cardiff City	A	0–0	10,809	
24 April 1999	Plymouth Argyle	H	2–3	5,660	O'Leary, Jones
1 May 1999	Rochdale	A	3–0	1,654	Price (2), Alsop
4 May 1999	Brentford	A	1–4	7,156	Bird
6 May 1999	Cambridge United	H	2–0	6,086	Watkin (2, 1 pen)
8 May 1999	Hull City	H	2–0	9,226	Watkin (2)

=== Third Division play-offs ===
Round	Date	Opponent	Venue	Result	Attendance	Goalscorers
SF 1st Leg	16 May 1999	Scunthorpe United	H	1–0	7,828	Bound
SF 2nd Leg	19 May 1999	Scunthorpe United	A	1–3 (lost 2–3 on agg)	7,089	Bird

=== FA Cup ===
Round	Date	Opponent	Venue	Result	Attendance	Goalscorers
R1	13 November 1998	Millwall	H	3–0	5,728	Price, Thomas, Alsop
R2	5 December 1998	Stoke City	H	1–0	7,460	Appleby
R3	2 January 1999	West Ham United	A	1-1	26,039	Smith, Dicks
Replay	13 January 1999	West Ham United	H	1–0	10,116	Martin Thomas
R4	23 January 1999	Derby County	H	0–2		

=== League Cup ===
Round	Date	Opponent	Venue	Result	Attendance	Goalscorers
R1 1st Leg	11 August 1998	Norwich City	H	1–1	3,803	Cusack
R1 2nd Leg	18 August 1998	Norwich City	A	0–1 (lost 1–2 on agg)	13,146	

=== Football League Trophy ===
Round	Date	Opponent	Venue	Result	Attendance	Goalscorers
R1S	8 December 1998	Barnet	H	4–1	1,017	Appleby, Smith, Bird (2)
R2S	5 January 1999	Gillingham	H	0–1	5,126	

== Squad ==
Note: Flags indicate national team as defined under FIFA eligibility rules; some limited exceptions apply. Players may hold more than one non-FIFA nationality.

No.	Pos.	Nation	Player
-	GK	WAL	Roger Freestone
-	DF	ENG	Matthew Bound
-	DF	ENG	Jason Smith
-	DF	ENG	Michael Howard
-	DF	ENG	Steve Jones
-	MF	ENG	Nick Cusack
-	MF	ENG	Richard Appleby
-	MF	ENG	Martin Thomas
-	MF	WAL	Kristian O'Leary
-	FW	WAL	Steve Watkin
-	FW	ENG	Julian Alsop
-	FW	WAL	Jonathan Coates
-	MF	WAL	Stuart Roberts
-	FW	WAL	Jason Price

No.	Pos.	Nation	Player
-	GK	WAL	Jason Jones
-	FW	WAL	Tony Bird
-	MF	WAL	Damien Lacey
-	MF	WAL	Lee Jenkins
-	FW	IRL	Ryan Casey
-	FW	ENG	Aidan Newhouse
-	FW	ENG	Dave O'Gorman
-	DF	ENG	Mark Clode
-	DF	SCO	Keith Walker
-	MF	WAL	Gareth Phillips
-	FW	WAL	Jamie Davies
-	MF	ENG	Karl Munroe
-	FW	WAL	Danny Barwood

=== Left club during the season ===
Note: Flags indicate national team as defined under FIFA eligibility rules; some limited exceptions apply. Players may hold more than one non-FIFA nationality.

No.	Pos.	Nation	Player
-	GK	ENG	Matt Gregg (on loan from Crystal Palace)
