= 1999–2000 Swansea City A.F.C. season =

Swansea City
1999–2000 season
- Chairman: Steve Hamer
- Manager: John Hollins
- Stadium: Vetch Field
- Third Division: 1st
- FA Cup: First round
- League Cup: Second round
- Top goalscorer: League: All: Steve Watkin (11)
- Highest home attendance: 10,743 (vs. Exeter City, 29 April)
- Lowest home attendance: 952 (vs. Caernarfon Town, 7 September)
Home colours	Away colours

The 1999–00 season was Swansea City A.F.C.'s 80th season in the English football league system, in this season Swansea finished 1st in the 3rd division with a total of 85 points from 46 games. It was also memorable for the fastest red card for a player in Swansea's history as Walter Boyd was red carded after coming on as a substitute in the second half against Darlington at Vetch Field and was sent off before play had restarted from the same free kick that allowed him to be substituted on in the first place.

== First-team squad ==
Squad at end of season

Note: Flags indicate national team as defined under FIFA eligibility rules; some limited exceptions apply. Players may hold more than one non-FIFA nationality.

No.	Pos.	Nation	Player
1	GK	WAL	Roger Freestone
2	GK	WAL	Jason Jones
3	DF	ENG	Matthew Bound
5	DF	ENG	Michael Howard
6	DF	WAL	Kristian O'Leary
7	DF	ENG	Jason Smith
8	MF	ENG	Richard Appleby
10	MF	IRL	Ryan Casey
11	MF	ENG	Nick Cusack (captain)
12	MF	WAL	Lee Jenkins

No.	Pos.	Nation	Player
13	MF	WAL	Damien Lacey
14	MF	WAL	Gareth Philips
15	MF	WAL	Jason Price
16	MF	ENG	Martin Thomas
18	FW	WAL	Tony Bird
19	FW	JAM	Walter Boyd
20	FW	WAL	Jonathan Coates
21	FW	WAL	Stuart Roberts
22	FW	WAL	Steve Watkin

== Final league table ==
Pos	Team	Pld	W	D	L	GF	GA	GD	Pts	Promotion or relegation
1	Swansea City (C, P)	46	24	13	9	51	30	+21	85	Promotion to the Second Division
2	Rotherham United (P)	46	24	12	10	72	36	+36	84	Promotion to the Second Division
3	Northampton Town (P)	46	25	7	14	63	45	+18	82	Promotion to the Second Division
4	Darlington	46	21	16	9	66	36	+30	79	Qualification for the Third Division play-offs
5	Peterborough United (O, P)	46	22	12	12	63	54	+9	78	Qualification for the Third Division play-offs

Rules for classification: 1) Points; 2) Goal difference; 3) Goals scored
(C) Champions; (O) Play-off winners; (P) Promoted
