= 2002–03 Swansea City A.F.C. season =

- Manager: Brian Flynn
- Stadium: Vetch Field
- Third Division: 21st
- FA Cup: First round
- League Cup: First round

During the 2002–03 English football season, Swansea City competed in the Football League Third Division.

== Season summary ==
Swansea narrowly avoided relegation from the Football League, just over 20 years after coming sixth in the top flight, with a final 21st-place finish. Swansea were in danger of relegation, but won their final game of the season to assure their status as a Football League club.

Swansea fared little better in the domestic cups, being knocked out in the first round of both the FA Cup (by Third Division York City) and League Cup (by First Division Wolverhampton Wanderers).

== Squad ==
Squad at end of season

Note: Flags indicate national team as defined under FIFA eligibility rules; some limited exceptions apply. Players may hold more than one non-FIFA nationality.

No.	Pos.	Nation	Player
1	GK	WAL	Roger Freestone
2	DF	WAL	Lee Jenkins
3	DF	ENG	David Smith
3	DF	ENG	Leon Hylton (on loan from Aston Villa)
4	DF	WAL	Kristian O'Leary
5	DF	ENG	Jason Smith
7	MF	WAL	Andrew Mumford
8	MF	ENG	Matt Murphy
9	FW	WAL	James Thomas
10	FW	WAL	Steve Watkin
11	MF	WAL	Jonathan Coates
12	GK	WAL	Andrew Marsh
12	DF	ENG	Alan Tate (on loan from Manchester United)
14	FW	ENG	Marc Richards (on loan from Blackburn Rovers)
15	FW	ENG	Kevin Nugent
15	FW	WAL	Jonathan Keaveny
17	DF	WAL	Terry Evans
18	MF	WAL	Gareth Phillips

No.	Pos.	Nation	Player
19	FW	ENG	John Williams
20	DF	ENG	Michael Howard
21	DF	ENG	Neil Sharp
23	MF	ENG	Nick Cusack
23	MF	IRL	Kieron Durkan
24	MF	ENG	Lenny Johnrose
25	FW	CAY	Jamie Wood
26	DF	WAL	Richard Duffy
27	MF	IRL	Brian Cash (on loan from Nottingham Forest)
27	MF	ESP	Roberto Martínez
28	DF	WAL	Stuart Jones
29	MF	ENG	Antonio Corbisiero
30	FW	ENG	Jamie Rewbury
32	FW	WAL	Craig Stiens (on loan from Leeds United)
33	GK	ENG	Neil Cutler (on loan from Stoke City)
35	MF	ENG	Leon Britton (on loan from West Ham United)
39	MF	ENG	Brad Maylett (on loan from Burnley)

=== Left club during season ===
Note: Flags indicate national team as defined under FIFA eligibility rules; some limited exceptions apply. Players may hold more than one non-FIFA nationality.

No.	Pos.	Nation	Player
6	DF	ENG	David Theobald (to Cambridge United)
11	MF	ENG	Paul Reid (to Carmarthen Town)
14	MF	ENG	Michael Jackson (to Bath City)

No.	Pos.	Nation	Player
16	MF	ENG	David Moss (to Hednesford Town)
22	MF	ENG	Damien Lacey (retired)
24	MF	WAL	Leigh De-Vulgt (to Carmarthen Town)
