= List of Swansea City A.F.C. seasons =

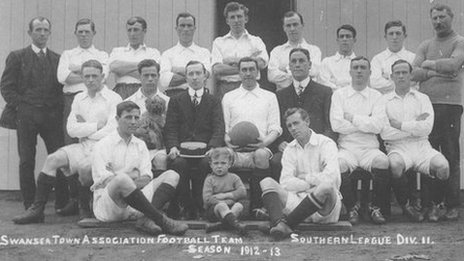
The Swansea Town team during its first season, 1912–13

This is a list of seasons played by Swansea City Association Football Club in English and European football. It covers the period from the club's inaugural season in 1912, to the end of the last completed season. It details the club's achievements in all major competitions, together with top scorers. Details of the abandoned 1939–40 season and unofficial Second World War leagues are not included.

Swansea have won the League Cup once, the Football League Trophy twice and the Welsh Cup 10 times. They have also qualified for UEFA Cup Winners' Cup 7 times and the UEFA Europa League once. In 2011, Swansea became the first Welsh club to play in the Premier League.

== History ==
The club was founded in 1912 as Swansea Town, and were elected to The Football League for the 1920–21 season. The club changed their name in 1969, when it adopted the name Swansea City to reflect Swansea's new status as a city.

Swansea City Seasons from 1920 until 2023

In 1981 Swansea won promotion to the top tier of English football, achieving a club record highest league finish of sixth position after having led the table for a brief period, but a decline then set in the season after and were relegated, before in 2003 the club narrowly avoided relegation to the Football Conference. In 2000, Swansea won the fourth tier of the English league, during a time this league was known as the Third Division, due to the 1992 formation of the Premier League. They went back into the fourth tier the following season, until a promotion from the newly named League Two followed, achieving a league finish of third place in the 2004–05 season. Three years later, their 2007–08 season in League One, ended in a first-place finish and promotion in the process to The Championship.

After a few near-misses reaching the play-offs, which included a last day of the season miss for a play-off berth, due to a 0–0 draw with Doncaster Rovers during the close of the 2009–10 season, Swansea later finished 3rd the following season. The "Swans" were promoted to the Premier League in 2011 after winning the play-off final at Wembley Stadium against Reading, thanks to a 4–2 victory and in the process became the first Welsh team in that league since its formation in 1992. This was the second time the Swans had made it to the top flight of English football, and having completed seven seasons in the Premier League they have spent a total of nine seasons in the top flight.

In Swansea's centenary year, the club won their first major English trophy beating Bradford City in the 2013 Football League Cup Final.

== Key ==
- Pld = Matches played
- W = Matches won
- D = Matches drawn
- L = Matches lost
- GF = Goals for
- GA = Goals against
- Pts = Points
- Pos = Final position
- Prem = Premier League
- Champ = EFL Championship
- League 1 = EFL League One
- League 2 = EFL League Two
- Div 1 = Football League First Division
- Div 2 = Football League Second Division
- Div 3 = Football League Third Division
- Div 3 (S) = Football League Third Division South
- Div 4 = Football League Fourth Division
- South 1 – Southern League First Division
- South 2 – Southern League Second Division
- F = Final
- SF = Semi-finals
- QF = Quarter-finals
- QR1 = First qualifying round
- QR2 = Second qualifying round
- QR3 = Third qualifying round
- QR4 = Fourth qualifying round
- QR5 = Fifth qualifying round
- QR6 = Sixth qualifying round
- PR = Preliminary round
- R1 = Round 1
- R2 = Round 2
- R3 = Round 3
- R4 = Round 4
- R5 = Round 5
- R6 = Round 6
- R7 = Round 7
- R8 = Round 8
- R32 = Round of 32

| 1st or W | Winners |
| 2nd or RU | Runners-up |
| | Play-offs |
| ↑ | Promoted |
| ↓ | Relegated |
| ♦ | Top scorer in division |

== Seasons ==
| Season | Division | Pld | W | D | L | GF | GA | Pts | Pos | FA Cup (Note: The expansion of the FA Cup, from 15 clubs in its inaugural season to currently more than 700 has meant successive changes in the competition's structure. Teams in the top two divisions were made exempt from the qualifying stages and the first two rounds of the Cup in 1925–26. Because of this rounds were renamed; the fifth and sixth qualifying rounds became first and second round proper. Since 1914–15 there have been a total of 14 rounds, in comparison to five in 1871–72.) | League Cup | League Trophy | Welsh Cup | FAW Cup | Competition | Result | Player(s) | Goals |
| Season | League | | | | | | | | | FA Cup | League Cup | League Trophy | Welsh Cup | FAW Cup | Europe | | Top goalscorer(s) (Note: Includes goals scored in the Football League, Premier League, EFL Cup, FA Cup, EFL Trophy, Welsh Cup, FAW Premier Cup and European competitions organised by UEFA.) | |
|---|---|---|---|---|---|---|---|---|---|---|---|---|---|---|---|---|---|---|
| 1912–13 | South 2 | 24 | 12 | 7 | 5 | 29 | 23 | 31 | 3rd | — | — | — | W | — | — | — | Billy Ball | 19 |
| 1913–14 | South 2 | 30 | 20 | 4 | 6 | 66 | 25 | 44 | 4th | R2 | — | — | SF | — | — | — | Billy Ball | 22 |
| 1914–15 | South 2 ↑ | 24 | 16 | 1 | 7 | 48 | 21 | 33 | 4th (Note: Although they had finished outside the automatic promotion places in 1914–15, Swansea Town were elected to the Southern Football League Division One after the First World War.) | R2 | — | — | RU | | — | — | Ivor Brown | 15 |
| 1915–19 (Note: No competitive football was played between 1915 and 1919 due to the First World War.) | — | — | — | — | — | — | — | — | — | — | — | — | — | — | — | — | — | — |
| 1919–20 | South 1 ↑ | 42 | 16 | 11 | 15 | 53 | 45 | 43 | 9th (Note: Swansea Town were elected to the Football League and were a founding member of the Football League Third Division.) | QR6 | — | — | SF | — | — | — | William Brown | 11 |
| 1920–21 | Div 3 | 42 | 18 | 15 | 9 | 56 | 45 | 51 | 5th | R2 | — | — | R3 | — | — | — | J Edmondson | 24 |
| 1921–22 | Div 3 (S) (Note: The Third Division was divided into North and South sections. The Third Division South was mainly the continuation of the Third Division of the previous season, while most of the teams in the Third Division North were newcomers in the league.) | 42 | 13 | 15 | 14 | 50 | 47 | 41 | 10th | R3 | — | — | R4 | — | — | — | J Edmondson | 15 |
| 1922–23 | Div 3 (S) | 42 | 22 | 9 | 11 | 78 | 45 | 53 | 3rd | QR5 | — | — | SF | — | — | — | Jack Smith | 30 |
| 1923–24 | Div 3 (S) | 42 | 22 | 8 | 12 | 60 | 48 | 52 | 4th | R2 | — | — | R5 | — | — | — | Harry Deacon | 18 |
| 1924–25 | Div 3 (S) ↑ | 42 | 23 | 11 | 8 | 68 | 29 | 57 | 1st | R2 | — | — | SF | — | — | — | Jack Fowler | 28 ♦ |
| 1925–26 | Div 2 | 42 | 19 | 11 | 12 | 77 | 57 | 49 | 5th | SF | — | — | RU | — | — | — | Jack Fowler | 35 |
| 1926–27 | Div 2 | 42 | 16 | 11 | 15 | 68 | 72 | 43 | 12th | R6 | — | — | R5 | — | — | — | Leonard Thompson | 28 |
| 1927–28 | Div 2 | 42 | 18 | 12 | 12 | 68 | 72 | 43 | 6th | R3 | — | — | R6 | — | — | — | Wilf Lewis | 27 |
| 1928–29 | Div 2 | 42 | 13 | 10 | 19 | 62 | 75 | 36 | 19th | R4 | — | — | R5 | — | — | — | Harry Deacon | 13 |
| 1929–30 | Div 2 | 42 | 14 | 9 | 19 | 56 | 61 | 37 | 15th | R3 | — | — | R6 | — | — | — | Ronnie Williams | 13 |
| 1930–31 | Div 2 | 42 | 12 | 10 | 20 | 51 | 74 | 34 | 20th | R3 | — | — | SF | — | — | — | Ronnie Williams | 20 |
| 1931–32 | Div 2 | 42 | 16 | 7 | 19 | 73 | 75 | 39 | 15th | R3 | — | — | W | — | — | — | Cyril Pearce | 40 ♦ |
| 1932–33 | Div 2 | 42 | 19 | 4 | 19 | 50 | 54 | 42 | 10th | R3 | — | — | R8 | — | — | — | Tudor Martin | 20 |
| 1933–34 | Div 2 | 42 | 10 | 15 | 17 | 51 | 60 | 35 | 19th | R5 | — | — | R6 | — | — | — | SH Lowry | 11 |
| 1934–35 | Div 2 | 42 | 14 | 7 | 20 | 56 | 67 | 36 | 17th | R4 | — | — | SF | — | — | — | Tudor Martin | 14 |
| 1935–36 | Div 2 | 42 | 15 | 9 | 18 | 67 | 76 | 39 | 13th | R3 | — | — | R7 | — | — | — | Jimmy Brain | 14 |
| 1936–37 | Div 2 | 42 | 15 | 7 | 20 | 50 | 65 | 37 | 16th | R5 | — | — | R7 | — | — | — | Jimmy Brain | 10 |
| 1937–38 | Div 2 | 42 | 13 | 12 | 17 | 45 | 73 | 38 | 18th | R3 | — | — | RU | — | — | — | I Lewis | 9 |
| 1938–39 | Div 2 | 42 | 11 | 12 | 19 | 50 | 83 | 34 | 19th | R3 | — | — | R5 | — | — | — | Tommy Bamford | 15 |
| 1939–40 | Div 2 | 3 | 1 | 0 | 2 | 5 | 11 | 2 | 15th | — | — | — | RU | — | — | — | Tommy Bamford | 4 |
| 1939–45 (Note: In September 1939 first-class football was suspended due to the Second World War, with the 1939–40 league table voided and regional competitions contested instead.) | — | — | — | — | — | — | — | — | — | — | — | — | — | — | — | — | — | — |
| 1945–46 | — | — | — | — | — | — | — | — | — | R3 (Note: The FA Cup was contested in 1945–46, but the Football League did not resume until the following season.) | — | — | — | — | — | — | Trevor Ford | 3 (Note: FA Cup goals only.) |
| 1946–47 | Div 2 ↓ | 42 | 11 | 7 | 24 | 55 | 83 | 29 | 21st | R4 | — | — | R6 | — | — | — | Norman Lockhart | 11 |
| 1947–48 | Div 3 (S) | 42 | 18 | 12 | 12 | 70 | 52 | 48 | 5th | R3 | — | — | R5 | — | — | — | Sammy McCrory Fred Rawcliffe | 15 |
| 1948–49 | Div 3 (S) ↑ | 42 | 27 | 8 | 7 | 87 | 34 | 62 | 1st | R2 | — | — | RU | — | — | — | Stan Richards Frank Scrine | 26 |
| 1949–50 | Div 2 | 42 | 17 | 9 | 16 | 53 | 49 | 43 | 8th | R4 | — | — | W | — | — | — | Frank Scrine | 15 |
| 1950–51 | Div 2 | 42 | 16 | 4 | 22 | 54 | 77 | 36 | 18th | R3 | — | — | R6 | — | — | — | S Howarth | 10 |
| 1951–52 | Div 2 | 42 | 12 | 12 | 18 | 72 | 76 | 36 | 19th | R5 | — | — | R5 | — | — | — | Ronnie Turnbull | 21 |
| 1952–53 | Div 2 | 42 | 15 | 12 | 15 | 78 | 81 | 42 | 11th | R3 | — | — | R7 | — | — | — | Terry Medwin | 20 |
| 1953–54 | Div 2 | 42 | 13 | 8 | 21 | 58 | 82 | 34 | 20th | R4 | — | — | R5 | — | — | — | Ivor Allchurch | 19 |
| 1954–55 | Div 2 | 42 | 17 | 9 | 16 | 86 | 83 | 43 | 10th | R5 | — | — | R6 | — | — | — | Harry Griffiths | 22 |
| 1955–56 | Div 2 | 42 | 20 | 6 | 16 | 83 | 81 | 46 | 10th | R3 | — | — | RU | — | — | — | Harry Griffiths Terry Medwin | 22 |
| 1956–57 | Div 2 | 42 | 19 | 7 | 16 | 90 | 90 | 45 | 10th | R3 | — | — | RU | — | — | — | Des Palmer | 22 |
| 1957–58 | Div 2 | 42 | 11 | 9 | 22 | 72 | 99 | 31 | 19th | R3 | — | — | R6 | — | — | — | Ivor Allchurch | 14 |
| 1958–59 | Div 2 | 42 | 16 | 9 | 17 | 79 | 81 | 41 | 11th | R3 | — | — | R6 | — | — | — | Mel Charles | 15 |
| 1959–60 | Div 2 | 42 | 15 | 10 | 17 | 82 | 84 | 40 | 12th | R4 | — | — | R6 | — | — | — | Colin Webster | 23 |
| 1960–61 | Div 2 | 42 | 18 | 11 | 13 | 77 | 73 | 47 | 7th | R5 | R2 | — | W | — | — | — | Colin Webster | 22 |
| 1961–62 | Div 2 | 42 | 12 | 12 | 18 | 61 | 83 | 36 | 20th | R3 | R2 | — | SF | — | Cup Winners' Cup | PR | Brayley Reynolds | 25 |
| 1962–63 | Div 2 | 42 | 15 | 9 | 18 | 51 | 72 | 39 | 15th | R4 | R2 | — | SF | — | — | — | Eddie Thomas | 17 |
| 1963–64 | Div 2 | 42 | 12 | 9 | 21 | 63 | 74 | 33 | 19th | SF | R3 | — | R6 | — | — | — | Jim McLaughlin Brayley Reynolds | 13 |
| 1964–65 | Div 2 ↓ | 42 | 11 | 10 | 21 | 62 | 84 | 32 | 22nd | R5 | R4 | — | SF | — | — | — | Keith Todd | 22 |
| 1965–66 | Div 3 | 46 | 15 | 11 | 20 | 81 | 96 | 41 | 17th | R1 | R2 | — | W | — | — | — | Jim McLaughlin | 26 |
| 1966–67 | Div 3 ↓ | 46 | 12 | 15 | 19 | 85 | 89 | 39 | 21st | R2 | R3 | — | R5 | — | Cup Winners' Cup | R1 | Ivor Allchurch | 14 |
| 1967–68 | Div 4 | 46 | 16 | 10 | 20 | 63 | 77 | 42 | 15th | R4 | R1 | — | R6 | — | — | — | Ivor Allchurch | 21 |
| 1968–69 | Div 4 | 46 | 19 | 11 | 16 | 58 | 54 | 49 | 10th | R3 | R3 | — | RU | — | — | — | Herbie Williams | 14 |
| 1969–70 | Div 4 ↑ | 46 | 21 | 18 | 7 | 66 | 45 | 60 | 3rd | R3 | R2 | — | SF | — | — | — | Dave Gwyther | 24 |
| 1970–71 | Div 3 | 46 | 15 | 16 | 15 | 59 | 56 | 46 | 11th | R4 | R2 | — | R6 | — | — | — | Dave Gwyther | 28 |
| 1971–72 | Div 3 | 46 | 17 | 10 | 19 | 46 | 59 | 44 | 14th | R4 | R1 | — | R5 | — | — | — | Dave Gwyther | 10 |
| 1972–73 | Div 3 ↓ | 46 | 14 | 9 | 23 | 51 | 73 | 37 | 23rd | R1 | R1 | — | R4 | — | — | — | Geoff Thomas | 11 |
| 1973–74 | Div 4 | 46 | 16 | 11 | 19 | 45 | 46 | 43 | 14th | R1 | R1 | — | R4 | — | — | — | Tony Screen | 9 |
| 1974–75 | Div 4 | 46 | 15 | 6 | 25 | 46 | 73 | 36 | 22nd (Note: At the end of the 1974/75 season, Swansea City were re-elected to the Football League.) | R1 | R1 | — | R5 | — | — | — | Robbie James | 9 |
| 1975–76 | Div 4 | 46 | 16 | 15 | 15 | 66 | 57 | 47 | 11th | R1 | R1 | — | R5 | — | — | — | Geoff Bray | 21 |
| 1976–77 | Div 4 | 46 | 25 | 8 | 13 | 92 | 68 | 58 | 5th | R1 | R4 | — | R5 | — | — | — | Jeremy Charles | 26 |
| 1977–78 | Div 4 ↑ | 46 | 23 | 10 | 13 | 87 | 47 | 56 | 3rd | R3 | R1 | — | R4 | — | — | — | Alan Curtis | 33 ♦ (Note: Alan Curtis tied with Steve Phillips of Brentford with 32 league goals.) |
| 1978–79 | Div 3 ↑ | 46 | 24 | 12 | 10 | 83 | 61 | 60 | 3rd | R3 | R3 | — | R5 | — | — | — | Robbie James | 24 |
| 1979–80 | Div 2 | 42 | 17 | 9 | 16 | 48 | 53 | 43 | 12th | R5 | R2 | — | SF | — | — | — | David Giles Alan Waddle | 13 |
| 1980–81 | Div 2 ↑ | 42 | 18 | 14 | 10 | 64 | 44 | 50 | 3rd | R3 | R2 | — | W | — | — | — | Leighton James | 18 |
| 1981–82 (Note: The 1981–82 season saw the introduction of three points for a win.) | Div 1 | 42 | 21 | 6 | 15 | 58 | 51 | 69 | 6th | R3 | R2 | — | W | — | Cup Winners' Cup | R1 | Robbie James | 20 |
| 1982–83 | Div 1 ↓ | 42 | 10 | 11 | 21 | 51 | 69 | 41 | 21st | R3 | R3 | — | W | — | Cup Winners' Cup | R2 | Bob Latchford | 34 |
| 1983–84 | Div 2 ↓ | 42 | 7 | 8 | 27 | 36 | 85 | 29 | 21st | R3 | R2 | — | SF | — | Cup Winners' Cup | PR | Ian Walsh | 8 |
| 1984–85 | Div 3 | 46 | 12 | 11 | 23 | 53 | 80 | 47 | 20th | R1 | R1 | QF | SF | — | — | — | Colin Pascoe | 14 |
| 1985–86 | Div 3 ↓ | 46 | 11 | 10 | 25 | 43 | 87 | 43 | 24th | R2 | R2 | SF | R5 | — | — | — | Roger Gibbins Alan Waddle | 7 |
| 1986–87 | Div 4 | 46 | 17 | 11 | 18 | 56 | 61 | 62 | 12th | R4 | R2 | R1 | R3 | — | — | — | Sean McCarthy | 21 |
| 1987–88 | Div 4 ↑ | 46 | 20 | 10 | 16 | 62 | 56 | 70 | 6th (Note: Promoted to the Third Division after beating Torquay United 5–4 on aggregate in the play-off final.) | R2 | R1 | PR | R4 | — | — | — | Colin Pascoe | 15 |
| 1988–89 | Div 3 | 46 | 15 | 16 | 15 | 51 | 53 | 61 | 12th | R2 | R1 | PR | W | — | — | — | Andy Melville | 14 |
| 1989–90 | Div 3 | 46 | 14 | 12 | 20 | 45 | 63 | 54 | 17th | R3 | R1 | PR | R3 | — | Cup Winners' Cup | R1 | Paul Raynor | 10 |
| 1990–91 | Div 3 | 46 | 13 | 9 | 24 | 49 | 72 | 48 | 20th | R3 | R1 | R1 | W | — | — | — | Jimmy Gilligan | 24 |
| 1991–92 | Div 3 | 46 | 14 | 14 | 18 | 55 | 65 | 56 | 19th | R2 | R2 | PR | R5 | — | Cup Winners' Cup | R1 | John Williams | 12 |
| 1992–93 | Div 2 (Note: In 1992 the First Division clubs broke away to form the FA Premier League. The Second Division, Third Division and Fourth Division were renamed the First Division, Second Division and Third Division respectively.) | 46 | 20 | 13 | 13 | 65 | 47 | 73 | 5th (Note: Lost the play-off semi-final to West Bromwich Albion 2–3 on aggregate.) | R4 | R1 | SF | R3 | — | — | — | Andy Legg | 15 |
| 1993–94 | Div 2 | 46 | 16 | 12 | 18 | 56 | 58 | 60 | 13th | R1 | R2 | W | SF | — | — | — | Jason Bowen | 17 |
| 1994–95 | Div 2 | 46 | 19 | 14 | 13 | 57 | 45 | 71 | 10th | R4 | R2 | SF | (Note: A new Welsh Cup rule was enforced: Only clubs playing in the Welsh football league system were allowed to enter the Welsh Cup.) | — | — | — | Steve Torpey | 17 |
| 1995–96 | Div 2 ↓ | 46 | 11 | 14 | 21 | 43 | 79 | 47 | 22nd | R1 | R1 | R2 | — | — | — | — | Steve Torpey | 17 |
| 1996–97 | Div 3 | 46 | 21 | 8 | 17 | 62 | 58 | 71 | 5th (Note: Lost in the play-off final to Northampton Town 0–1.) | R1 | R1 | R2 | — | — | — | — | David Penney | 13 |
| 1997–98 | Div 3 | 46 | 13 | 11 | 22 | 49 | 62 | 50 | 20th | R1 | R1 | R2 | — | QF | — | — | Tony Bird | 16 |
| 1998–99 | Div 3 | 46 | 19 | 14 | 13 | 56 | 48 | 71 | 7th (Note: Lost play-off semi-final to Scunthorpe United 2–3 on aggregate.) | R4 | R1 | R2 | — | QF | — | — | Steve Watkin | 20 |
| 1999–2000 | Div 3 ↑ | 46 | 24 | 13 | 9 | 51 | 30 | 85 | 1st | R2 | R2 | R2 | — | QF | — | — | Steve Watkin | 11 |
| 2000–01 | Div 2 ↓ | 46 | 8 | 13 | 25 | 47 | 73 | 37 | 23rd | R1 | R1 | QF | — | RU | — | — | Giovanni Savarese | 14 |
| 2001–02 | Div 3 | 46 | 13 | 12 | 21 | 53 | 77 | 51 | 20th | R2 | R1 | R1 | — | RU | — | — | Steve Watkin | 11 |
| 2002–03 | Div 3 | 46 | 12 | 13 | 21 | 48 | 65 | 49 | 21st (Note: Won on the final day of the season, beating Hull City 4–2, to stay in the Football League.) | R1 | R1 | R1 | — | QF | — | — | James Thomas | 15 |
| 2003–04 | Div 3 | 46 | 15 | 14 | 17 | 58 | 61 | 59 | 10th | R5 | R1 | R2 | — | SF | — | — | Lee Trundle | 21 |
| 2004–05 | League 2 ↑ (Note: The three divisions in the Football League were renamed. Division One, Division Two and Division Three were renamed The Championship, League One and League Two respectively.) | 46 | 24 | 8 | 14 | 62 | 43 | 80 | 3rd | R3 | R1 | R2 | — | W | — | — | Lee Trundle | 23 |
| 2005–06 | League 1 | 46 | 18 | 17 | 11 | 78 | 55 | 71 | 6th (Note: Lost in the play-off final to Barnsley 3–4 on Penalties, after drawing 2–2.) | R1 | R1 | W | — | W | — | — | Lee Trundle | 22 |
| 2006–07 | League 1 | 46 | 20 | 12 | 14 | 69 | 53 | 72 | 7th | R4 | R1 | R2 | — | QF | — | — | Lee Trundle | 20 |
| 2007–08 | League 1 ↑ | 46 | 27 | 11 | 8 | 82 | 42 | 92 | 1st | R3 | R2 | SF | — | QF | — | — | Jason Scotland | 29 ♦ |
| 2008–09 | Champ | 46 | 16 | 20 | 10 | 63 | 50 | 68 | 8th | R5 | R4 | — | — | — | — | — | Jason Scotland | 24 |
| 2009–10 | Champ | 46 | 17 | 18 | 11 | 40 | 37 | 69 | 7th | R3 | R2 | — | — | — | — | — | Darren Pratley | 7 |
| 2010–11 | Champ ↑ | 46 | 24 | 8 | 14 | 69 | 42 | 80 | 3rd (Note: Promoted to the FA Premier League after beating Reading 4–2 in the play-off final.) | R4 | R4 | — | — | — | — | — | Scott Sinclair | 27 |
| 2011–12 | Prem | 38 | 12 | 11 | 15 | 44 | 51 | 47 | 11th | R4 | R2 | — | (Note: Swansea City were invited to participate in the Welsh Cup, but later declined after UEFA blocked European qualification for any Welsh teams playing within the English football league system.) | — | — | — | Danny Graham | 14 |
| 2012–13 | Prem | 38 | 11 | 13 | 14 | 47 | 51 | 46 | 9th | R3 | W | — | — | — | — | — | Michu | 22 |
| 2013–14 | Prem | 38 | 11 | 9 | 18 | 54 | 54 | 42 | 12th | R5 | R3 | — | — | — | Europa League | R32 | Wilfried Bony | 25 |
| 2014–15 | Prem | 38 | 16 | 8 | 14 | 46 | 49 | 56 | 8th | R4 | R4 | — | — | — | — | — | Bafétimbi Gomis | 10 |
| 2015–16 | Prem | 38 | 12 | 11 | 15 | 42 | 52 | 47 | 12th | R3 | R3 | — | — | — | — | — | André Ayew | 12 |
| 2016–17 | Prem | 38 | 12 | 5 | 21 | 45 | 70 | 41 | 15th | R3 | R3 | — | — | — | — | — | Fernando Llorente | 15 |
| 2017–18 | Prem ↓ | 38 | 8 | 9 | 21 | 28 | 56 | 33 | 18th | QF | R4 | — | — | — | — | — | Jordan Ayew | 11 |
| 2018–19 | Champ | 46 | 18 | 11 | 17 | 65 | 62 | 65 | 10th | QF | R2 | — | — | — | — | — | Oli McBurnie | 24 |
| 2019–20 | Champ | 46 | 18 | 16 | 12 | 62 | 53 | 70 | 6th (Note: Lost play-off semi-final to Brentford 2–3 on aggregate.) | R3 | R3 | — | — | — | — | — | André Ayew | 18 |
| 2020–21 | Champ | 46 | 23 | 11 | 12 | 56 | 39 | 80 | 4th (Note: Lost play-off final to Brentford 0-2) | R5 | R1 | — | — | — | — | — | André Ayew | 17 |
| 2021–22 | Champ | 46 | 16 | 13 | 17 | 58 | 68 | 61 | 15th | R3 | R3 | — | — | — | — | — | Joël Piroe | 23 |
| 2022–23 | Champ | 46 | 18 | 12 | 16 | 68 | 64 | 66 | 10th | R3 | R1 | — | — | — | — | — | Joël Piroe | 20 |
| 2023–24 | Champ | 46 | 15 | 12 | 19 | 59 | 65 | 57 | 14th | R4 | R2 | — | — | — | — | — | Jamal Lowe Jerry Yates | 9 |
| 2024–25 | Champ | 46 | 17 | 10 | 19 | 51 | 56 | 61 | 11th | R3 | R2 | — | — | — | — | — | Liam Cullen | 11 |
| 2025–26 | Champ | 46 | 18 | 10 | 18 | 57 | 59 | 64 | 11th | R3 | R4 | — | — | — | — | — | Žan Vipotnik | 25 ♦ |
