= 1996–97 Swansea City A.F.C. season =

Swansea City
1996–97 season
- Chairman: Doug Sharpe
- Manager: Jan Mølby (player-manager)
- Stadium: Vetch Field
- Third Division: 5th
- Play-offs: Runners-up
- FA Cup: First round
- League Cup: First round
- Football League Trophy: Second round
- Top goalscorer: Penney (13)
- Average home league attendance: 3,850
Home colours

During the 1996–97 English football season, Swansea City competed in the Football League Third Division, following relegation from the Second Division.

== Season summary ==
In the 1996–97 season, Swansea reached the final of the 1997 Third Division play-offs for promotion, but lost to 1–0 to Northampton Town, whose goal came from a re-taken free kick by John Frain in the final minute.

== Final league table ==
Pos	Team	Pld	W	D	L	GF	GA	GD	Pts	Promotion or relegation
3	Carlisle United (P)	46	24	12	10	67	44	+23	84	Promotion to the Second Division
4	Northampton Town (O, P)	46	20	12	14	67	44	+23	72	Qualification for the Third Division play-offs
5	Swansea City	46	21	8	17	62	58	+4	71	Qualification for the Third Division play-offs
6	Chester City	46	18	16	12	55	43	+12	70	Qualification for the Third Division play-offs
7	Cardiff City	46	20	9	17	57	55	+2	69	Qualification for the Third Division play-offs

Rules for classification: In the Football League goals scored (GF) takes precedence over goal difference (GD).
(O) Play-off winners; (P) Promoted

== Squad ==
Squad at end of season

Note: Flags indicate national team as defined under FIFA eligibility rules; some limited exceptions apply. Players may hold more than one non-FIFA nationality.

No.	Pos.	Nation	Player
—	GK	WAL	Roger Freestone
—	GK	WAL	Lee Jones
—	DF	ENG	Mark Clode
—	DF	WAL	Christian Edwards
—	DF	WAL	Robert King
—	DF	IRL	Ryan Casey
—	DF	SCO	Keith Walker
—	DF	DEN	Thomas Willer-Jensen
—	DF	ANG	Joao Moreira
—	MF	ENG	Richard Appleby
—	MF	ENG	Steve Jones
—	MF	ENG	Dave Penney
—	MF	WAL	Shaun Chapple

No.	Pos.	Nation	Player
—	MF	WAL	Jonathan Coates
—	MF	WAL	Lee Jenkins
—	MF	WAL	Damian Lacey
—	MF	WAL	Kristian O'Leary
—	MF	IRL	Kwame Ampadu
—	MF	DEN	Jan Mølby
—	FW	ENG	Linton Brown
—	FW	ENG	Carl Heggs
—	FW	ENG	Steve Torpey
—	FW	WAL	Jason Price
—	FW	WAL	Dai Thomas
—	FW	SCO	Colin McDonald

=== Left club during season ===
Note: Flags indicate national team as defined under FIFA eligibility rules; some limited exceptions apply. Players may hold more than one non-FIFA nationality.

No.	Pos.	Nation	Player
—	DF	ENG	Andy Cook (to Portsmouth)
—	DF	ENG	Shaun Garnett (to Oldham Athletic)
—	DF	ENG	John Hills (on loan from Everton)

No.	Pos.	Nation	Player
—	DF	NIR	Pat McGibbon (on loan from Manchester United)
—	MF	ENG	John Hodge (to Walsall)
—	FW	ENG	Paul Brayson (on loan from Newcastle United)
