= Stephen Healey =

British Army soldier

- Born: Stephen James Healey; 19 September 1982; Cardiff, Wales, UK
- Died: 26 May 2012 (aged 29); Nahri Saraj District, Helmand, Afghanistan
- Military career
- Allegiance: United Kingdom
- Branch: British Army
- Service years: 2007–2012
- Rank: Captain
- Units: 1st Battalion, The Royal Welsh (Royal Welsh Fusiliers)
- Conflicts: War in Afghanistan †
- Awards: Mention in Despatches (September 2010)

Captain Stephen James Healey (19 September 1982 – 26 May 2012) was a British Army officer with the 1st Battalion, The Royal Welsh (Royal Welch Fusiliers), and former professional footballer for Swansea City.

He was killed by an improvised explosive device on routine vehicle patrol in the Nahri Saraj District of Helmand province, Afghanistan, on 26 May 2012.

== Early life ==
Healey was born on 19 September 1982 in Cardiff, Wales. Football was a key part of his early life and Healey aspired as a child to become a professional footballer. He chose a career in the game against the advice of his school teachers, who wanted him to take the education route. He first served a two-year apprenticeship with Swansea City, a Football League club based in Swansea, Wales.

== Football career ==
Stephen Healey
Personal information
- Full name: Stephen James Healey
- Date of birth: 19 September 1982
- Place of birth: Cardiff, Wales
- Date of death: 26 May 2012 (aged 29)
- Place of death: Nahri Saraj District, Helmand, Afghanistan
- Height: 6 ft 2 in (1.88 m)
- Position: Defender

Youth career
- ?–2001: Swansea City

Senior career*
Years	Team	Apps	(Gls)
2001–2002	Swansea City	0	(0)
2001–2002	→ Llanelli (loan)	11	(0)
2002–2003	Llanelli	20	(2)
2003–2005	Port Talbot Town	18	(0)
2005–2006	Cardiff Grange Harlequins	1	(0)
	Bridgend Town	?	(?)
	Goytre United	?	(?)
	Barry Town	?	(?)
2010–2012	Garden Village	?	(?)
- * Club domestic league appearances and goals

After serving his apprenticeship with Swansea City, he signed a two-year professional contract with the club. Having signed at age 19, he played for around three years, before suffering a series of injuries in the space of 6 months. He played in defence as a 6-foot 2 inch tall, 150 lb centre back. For the 2001–02 season, Healey wore number 21.

Under the Swansea manager John Hollins, Healey was expected to sign his first professional contract with the club on 17 May 2001, along with fellow trainees Chris O'Sullivan and Craig Draper. In a pre-season friendly on 8 August 2001 against Haverfordwest County, Healey was singled out for praise by the Evening Post as the energetic heart of the defence, in a 5–1 away win.

By 16 March 2002, with the club in the temporary charge of Nick Cusack and Roger Freestone, Healey and Draper were out on loan to the League of Wales side Llanelli.

By 15 May 2002, out of the trio of first year professionals of Draper, Healey and O'Sullivan, only Draper had made any first team appearances when all three players; along with Jason Jones, Chris Todd, Jonathan Coates, Ryan Casey and Steve Brodie, all were released from their contracts by the club. The players were released by Cusack, by now the club's player-manager, as he was facing budget constraints and a need to refresh the squad with more experienced players more suited to playing in the Third Division. Other players released that summer were Ben Davies, James Fox and Mamady Sidibe.

== Higher education ==
After being released by Swansea, Healey decided he was not likely to have a long career in football, and decided to quit the game and resume his education. He entered higher education as a slightly older student (i.e. not yet old enough to be classed as a mature student). Despite not having any A-Levels, Swansea University accepted him on degree course in sports science based on his experience as a footballer.

Between 2002 and 2006, Healey continued to play football in the semi-professional League of Wales (renamed the Welsh Premier League from 2002 to 2003), continuing with Llanelli for another season, then playing for two seasons with Port Talbot Town and one season for Cardiff Grange Harlequins. He also played for Bridgend Town, Goytre United and Barry Town.

== Military career ==
Whilst at university, Healey had decided that the British Army would be his new career path. Having recovered from his sporting injuries, he joined the Army in 2007. Choosing the officer career path, he first attended the Royal Military Academy Sandhurst in Berkshire, England. He chose to join the infantry for the challenge, and the Royal Welsh regiment specifically due to his Welsh origins. Attached to the light infantry battalion the 1st Battalion (Royal Welch Fusiliers) of the Royal Welsh regiment (1 WELSH), Healey was based in his native Cardiff, in south Wales.

As part of the War in Afghanistan, OP Herrick 11, in 2009 the 1st Battalion was deployed to Helmand Province, which became Healey's first tour to the country. The tour ran from December 2009 to April 2010, and latterly saw the battalion contribute to Operation Moshtarak.

In January 2010, while leading a vehicle convoy Healey survived a first improvised explosive device (IED) attack on his Mastiff PPV (Protected Patrol Vehicle). According to Healey there were around 12 Mastiffs in the convoy moving through a sparse village area, with no outward signs an IED attack was imminent. Healey was seated in the gun turret, with eight soldiers and an interpreter in the cabin below, when the IED exploded directly beneath the vehicle. While there were no resultant deaths, the force of the blast was sufficient to snap machine gun barrels, and rendered the vehicle beyond use. Once the area was secured and the vehicle recovered, the platoon had the night off, before returning to patrols the next day.

Having returned from Afghanistan, in Summer 2010, Healey and another Lieutenant led a group of 26 soldiers of 1 WELSH on a 224 miles (360 km) charity run across Wales, starting in Chester on 22 June and finishing in Cardiff on 26 June, crossing the line on Armed Forces Day, which was being held in the city. It raised funds for the Army Benevolent Fund, the visually imparied soldiers charity St Dunstan's, and their colleagues injured in Afghanistan.

Healey received a Mention in Despatches, announced in the Operational Honours and Awards list of 24 September 2010. This was for his outstanding leadership during one particular ambush during his first Afghan tour. While his unit were providing protection for a team clearing IEDs from a road, they came under significant enemy attack pinning some of his men down. He drew enemy fire three times in order to expose their positions, so that his unit could return accurate fire.

On his first tour of Afghanistan, Healey was a lieutenant, serving as platoon commander of the battalion's B Company. He was promoted to captain following the tour. Speaking in 2010, he stated he wanted a full career in the Army, intending to stay for at least 12 years. He continued to play football, occasionally turning out for the full army team. In Summer 2010, he joined the Swansea-based Welsh Football League Division One team Garden Village.

In February 2011 Healey trained with the battalion in Sennybridge Training Area in preparation for their tour to Kenya on exercise Askari Thunder. The 1st Battalion redeployed to Afghanistan in early March 2012 on OP Herrick 16, and it was during this mobilisation that Healey was killed.

== Death ==
Healey was on patrol in the Nahri Saraj District of Helmand province, Afghanistan, when his vehicle was blown up by an improvised explosive device. He was given first aid on scene, before being flown to the military hospital at Camp Bastion where he was confirmed dead on arrival. He died 78 days into the tour having arrived in the country on 9 March 2012 as part of 12 Mechanised Brigade on OP Herrick 16.

Before his death he was in command of the 1st Battalion Royal Welsh reconnaissance platoon where he was responsible for Checkpoint Langar as part of Combined Force Burma within the Nahri Saraj District near Gereshk. He was the 415th member of the British Armed Forces to be killed since operations commenced in October 2001.

His funeral service, with full military honours, was held on 15 June at St Cadoc's Roman Catholic Church, Llanrumney.
