= 2003–04 Swansea City A.F.C. season =

- Manager: Brian Flynn (until 18th March 2004), Kenny Jackett (from 4th April 2004)
- Stadium: Vetch Field
- Third Division: 10th
- FA Cup: Fifth round proper
- Carling Cup: First round
- Top goalscorer: Trundle (17)

During the 2003–04 English football season, Swansea City A.F.C. competed in the Football League Third Division.

== Season summary ==
After narrowly avoiding relegation from the Football League on the final day of the previous season, Swansea improved dramatically on last term's 21st-place finish by ending the campaign 10th in the table, albeit 12 points adrift of 9th-placed Oxford United. Their cup form improved too, beating Premiership hopefuls Preston North End in the fourth round of the FA Cup before being knocked out by Tranmere Rovers.

Striker Lee Trundle, signed from Welsh rivals Wrexham, finished 7th highest scorer (joint with Lincoln City's Gary Fletcher) in the division with 17 goals.

== Squad ==
Note: Flags indicate national team as defined under FIFA eligibility rules; some limited exceptions apply. Players may hold more than one non-FIFA nationality.

No.	Pos.	Nation	Player
1	GK	WAL	Roger Freestone
2	DF	ENG	Shaun Byrne (on loan from West Ham United)
3	DF	ENG	Mike Howard
4	DF	WAL	Kristian O'Leary
5	DF	ENG	Alan Tate (on loan from Manchester United; loan made permanent transfer)
6	MF	ESP	Roberto Martínez
7	MF	ENG	Leon Britton
8	FW	ENG	Kevin Nugent
9	FW	WAL	James Thomas
10	FW	ENG	Lee Trundle
11	MF	WAL	Leyton Maxwell
12	GK	WAL	Andrew Marsh
12	DF	ENG	Leon Hylton
14	MF	ENG	Brad Maylett

No.	Pos.	Nation	Player
15	MF	WAL	Jonathan Coates
16	FW	ENG	Karl Connelly
17	FW	ENG	Paul Connor
18	FW	ENG	Andy Robinson
19	MF	WAL	Stuart Roberts
20	DF	WAL	Stuart Jones
21	GK	IRL	Brian Murphy
22	DF	ENG	Izzy Iriekpen
23	MF	ENG	Antonio Corbisiero
24	MF	WAL	Richard Jones (on loan from Southampton)
25	DF	WAL	Matthew Rees (on loan from Millwall)
26	FW	WAL	Mark Pritchard
28	DF	ENG	Lee Fieldwick (on loan from Brentford)
29	GK	ENG	Ryan Harrison
30	DF	ENG	Jamie Rewbury

While on loan from Manchester United, Alan Tate wore the number 27 jersey.

=== Left club during season ===
Note: Flags indicate national team as defined under FIFA eligibility rules; some limited exceptions apply. Players may hold more than one non-FIFA nationality.

No.	Pos.	Nation	Player
2	DF	WAL	Lee Jenkins (to Kidderminster Harriers)
5	DF	ENG	Jason Smith (released)
11	MF	ENG	Lenny Johnrose (to Burnley)
17	MF	ENG	Kieran Durkan (to Chester City)
19	DF	WAL	Richard Duffy (to Portsmouth)

No.	Pos.	Nation	Player
25	MF	ENG	Mark Wilson (on loan from Middlesbrough)
27	DF	ENG	Earl Davis (to Southport)
28	FW	ENG	Daniel Nardiello (on loan from Manchester United)
31	GK	WAL	Tony Williams (on loan from Hartlepool United)
