= Mazzina =

Mazzina is an Italian surname. Notable people with this surname include:

- Ayelén Mazzina (born 1989), Argentine politician
- Nicolás Mazzina (born 1979), Argentine footballer
