= Matthew Bound =

English footballer

Personal information
- Full name: Matthew Terence Bound
- Date of birth: 9 November 1972 (age 53)
- Place of birth: Melksham, England
- Height: 6 ft 2 in (1.88 m)
- Position: Central defender

Youth career
- 1986–1991: Southampton

Senior career*
Years	Team	Apps	(Gls)
1991–1994	Southampton	5	(0)
1993	→ Hull City (loan)	7	(1)
1994–1997	Stockport County	44	(5)
1995	→ Lincoln City (loan)	4	(0)
1997–2002	Swansea City	174	(9)
2001–2002	→ Oxford United (loan)	8	(0)
2002–2004	Oxford United	92	(2)
2004–2006	Weymouth	75	(14)
2006–2007	Eastleigh	33	(4)
2009	Weymouth	3	(0)
Total		445	(35)
- * Club domestic league appearances and goals

Matthew Terence Bound (born 9 November 1972) is an English former football defender.

== Career statistics ==
Appearances and goals by club, season and competition
Club	Season	League			FA Cup		League Cup		Other		Total	
Club	Season	Division	Apps	Goals	Apps	Goals	Apps	Goals	Apps	Goals	Apps	Goals
Southampton
Southampton	1991–92	First Division	1	0	0	0	0	0	—		1	0
Southampton	1992–93	Premier League	3	0	0	0	0	0	—		3	0
Southampton	1993–94	Premier League	1	0	0	0	0	0	—		1	0
Southampton	Total		5	0	0	0	0	0	0	0	5	0
Hull City (loan)	1993–94	Second Division	7	1	0	0	0	0	—		7	1
Stockport County
Stockport County	1994–95	Second Division	14	0	1	0	0	0	2 (Note: Appearances in EFL Trophy)	1	17	1
Stockport County	1995–96	Second Division	26	5	2	1	0	0	—		28	6
Stockport County	1996–97	Second Division	4	0	0	0	1	0	1	0	6	0
Stockport County	Total		44	5	3	1	1	0	3	1	51	7
Lincoln City (loan)	1995–96	Third Division	4	0	0	0	0	0	1	0	5	0
Swansea City
Swansea City	1997–98	Third Division	28	0	0	0	0	0	1	1	29	1
Swansea City	1998–99	Third Division	45	2	5	0	2	0	4 (Note: Appearances in EFL Trophy (2 appearances) and play-offs (2 appearances, 1 goal))	1	56	3
Swansea City	1999–2000	Third Division	43	2	2	0	4	1	2	0	51	3
Swansea City	2000–01	Second Division	40	3	1	0	2	1	1	0	44	4
Swansea City	2001–02	Third Division	18	2	2	0	0	0	1	0	21	2
Swansea City	Total		174	9	10	0	8	2	9	2	201	13
Oxford United (loan)	2001–02	Third Division	8	0	0	0	0	0	—		8	0
Oxford United
Oxford United	2001–02	Third Division	14	0	0	0	0	0	—		14	0
Oxford United	2002–03	Third Division	41	1	3	0	3	0	1	0	48	1
Oxford United	2003–04	Third Division	37	1	1	0	2	0	1	0	41	1
Oxford United	Total		100	2	4	0	5	0	2	0	111	2
Weymouth
Weymouth	2004–05	Conference South	34	3	0	0	—		—		34	3
Weymouth	2005–06	Conference South	41	11	1	0	—		—		42	11
Weymouth	Total		75	14	1	0	0	0	0	0	76	14
Eastleigh	2006–07	Conference South	33	4	0	0	—		—		33	4
Weymouth	2009–10	Conference South	3	0	0	0	—		—		3	0
Career total			445	35	18	1	14	2	15	3	492	41

== Honours ==
Swansea City

- Football League Third Division: 1999–2000

Individual

- PFA Team of the Year: 1999–2000 Third Division
