= Jason Price =

Welsh footballer (born 1977)

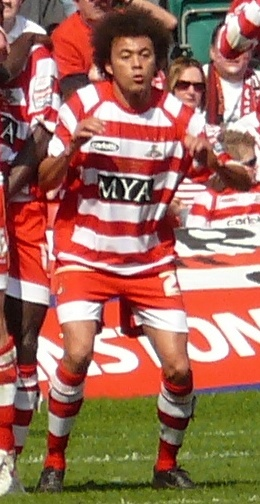
- Price playing for Doncaster Rovers in the 2007 Football League Trophy final

Personal information
- Full name: Jason Jeffrey Price
- Date of birth: 12 April 1977 (age 49)
- Place of birth: Aberdare, Wales
- Position: Forward

Youth career
- –1995: Aberaman

Senior career*
Years	Team	Apps	(Gls)
1995–2001	Swansea City	130	(15)
2001	Brentford	15	(1)
2001–2003	Tranmere Rovers	49	(11)
2003–2006	Hull City	75	(13)
2006–2009	Doncaster Rovers	93	(17)
2009	→ Millwall (loan)	8	(3)
2009–2010	Millwall	15	(1)
2010	→ Oldham Athletic (loan)	7	(1)
2010	→ Carlisle United (loan)	9	(4)
2010–2011	Carlisle United	3	(0)
2010–2011	→ Bradford City (loan)	10	(0)
2011	→ Walsall (loan)	5	(0)
2011	→ Hereford United (loan)	4	(0)
2011	Barnet	5	(1)
2011–2012	Morecambe	18	(2)
2012	Guiseley	7	(1)
2012–2013	Prestatyn Town	28	(11)
2013	Ossett Town		
2013	Selby Town		
2013–2014	Shaw Lane Aquaforce		
2014–2016	Brighouse Town		
2016	Almondbury Woolpack	4	(4)
2017	Ossett Albion		
2017	Harrogate Railway Athletic		

International career
1998–1999	Wales U21	7	(0)
- * Club domestic league appearances and goals

Jason Jeffrey Price (born 12 April 1977) is a Welsh former footballer who played as a right sided midfielder or as a forward.

== Club career ==
Price had spells with Swansea City, Brentford (for whom he scored once against Reading), Tranmere Rovers and Hull City.

=== Doncaster Rovers ===
He signed for Doncaster Rovers under former Rovers manager David Penney, and soon established himself as a key player under Sean O'Driscoll.

On the return to his home country for the Football League Trophy Final at the Millennium Stadium in Cardiff on 1 April 2007, Price suffered a snapped Achilles tendon ruling him out for nine months. He renewed his contract at Doncaster in June 2008 when his previous deal was due to expire. Despite much talk of him leaving Rovers, Price took up a new one-year deal.

One of Price's most important goals was against Aston Villa in the 2008–09 FA Cup fourth round replay at Villa Park, when he poked in a cross from James Coppinger just before half-time.

He joined Millwall on loan on 26 March 2009 for the remainder of the season, and two days later he scored on his Millwall debut – a 90th-minute winner which earned the Lions a crucial 1–0 victory at Crewe Alexandra.

Price returned to Doncaster at the end of the season but was released from his contract on 7 May.

=== Millwall ===
On 7 July 2009 Price signed for Millwall on a one-year deal. He joined Oldham Athletic on a one-month loan deal on 1 February 2010, making seven appearances and scoring once against Swindon Town before returning to Millwall. Two days after his return, Price left the club on loan for a second time, joining Carlisle United until the end of the 2009–10 season. Price managed to score his first goal for the Cumbrians on his debut as Carlisle won the match 2–1 against Colchester.

=== Carlisle United ===
On 17 June 2010 Price signed a 1-year deal with Carlisle United. On 13 October 2010 he signed a one-month loan deal with Bradford City. His loan was extended to the start of January 2011, with Price scoring his first goal in his eighth game with the club, in a 1–1 draw with Accrington Stanley. On 28 January 2011 Price signed a one-month loan deal with Walsall who, at the time, were bottom of Football League One. Price made his debut at home the following day in a 6–1 victory over Bristol Rovers, the club's best league result since 1986 (which was a 6–0 victory, also over Bristol Rovers). On 24 March 2011 Price signed a loan deal with Hereford United until the end of the season.

He was released by Carlisle United in May 2011 before signing an initial one-month deal with Barnet in League 2 in August 2011.

=== Barnet ===
On 2 August 2011, Price signed for Barnet on a one-month deal. He made his debut in a 1–0 win away to Morecambe and scored on his home debut in a 3–1 defeat against Port Vale.

=== Morecambe ===
On 3 September 2011, Price signed for Morecambe on a four-month deal. He made his full debut at home in Morecambe's 6–0 hammering over Crawley Town on 10 September 2011.

=== Guiseley ===
Price was released by Morecambe on 15 March 2012 to enable him to join Guiseley for the rest of the season.

=== Prestatyn Town ===
In August 2012, Price joined Welsh Premier League side Prestatyn Town and made his debut on the opening day of the season in a 4–2 victory over Afan Lido. Price made a great start to life in the Welsh premier league scoring several goals and winning player of the month for September. Price scored two goals to help Prestatyn win the Welsh cup final in a 3–1 extra time victory over Bangor City.

=== Later career ===
In the 2013–14 season, Price had spells with Ossett Town, Selby Town, Shaw Lane Aquaforce and Brighouse Town. In August 2016, Price signed for Almondbury Woolpack of the Huddersfield and District League. On 30 August 2016 he scored two goals in his first game against Flockton FC, in which Woolpack went on to win 7–0. He also assisted four goals in that game.

== International career ==
Price was capped by WALES u21 level.

== Career statistics ==
Appearances and goals by club, season and competition
Club	Season	League			National Cup		League Cup		Other		Total	
Club	Season	Division	Apps	Goals	Apps	Goals	Apps	Goals	Apps	Goals	Apps	Goals
Swansea City	1996–97	Third Division	2	0	0	0	0	0	0	0	2	0
Swansea City	1997–98	Third Division	34	3	1	0	2	0	0	0	37	3
Swansea City	1998–99	Third Division	28	3	2	1	2	0	3 (Note: 2 appearances in Football League Trophy, 1 appearance in Third Division play-offs)	1	35	5
Swansea City	1999–2000	Third Division	39	6	1	0	4	1	0	0	44	7
Swansea City	2000–01	Second Division	41	4	0	0	2	0	2 (Note: Appearances in Football League Trophy)	1	45	5
Swansea City	Total		144	16	4	1	10	1	5	2	163	20
Brentford	2001–02	Second Division	15	1	―		2	0	1	0	18	1
Tranmere Rovers	2001–02	Second Division	24	7	5	4	―		―		29	11
Tranmere Rovers	2002–03	Second Division	25	4	0	0	0	0	0	0	25	4
Tranmere Rovers	Total		49	11	5	4	0	0	0	0	54	15
Hull City	2003–04	Third Division	33	9	1	1	1	0	1	0	36	10
Hull City	2004–05	League One	27	2	2	0	1	0	1	1	31	3
Hull City	2005–06	Championship	15	2	1	0	1	1	―		17	3
Hull City	Total		75	13	4	1	3	1	2	1	84	16
Doncaster Rovers	2005–06	League One	11	4	―		―		―		11	4
Doncaster Rovers	2006–07	League One	31	6	4	0	3	0	6	4	44	10
Doncaster Rovers	2007–08	League One	29	7	2	0	0	0	4 (Note: 3 appearances in League One play-offs, 1 appearance and 1 goal in Football League Trophy)	1	35	8
Doncaster Rovers	2008–09	Championship	22	0	2	1	0	0	―		24	1
Doncaster Rovers	Total		93	17	8	1	3	0	10	5	114	23
Millwall (loan)	2008–09	League One	8	3	0	0	―		1 (Note: Appearance in League One play-offs)	0	9	3
Millwall	2009–10	League One	15	1	3	2	1	0	1	0	20	3
Millwall	Total		23	4	3	2	1	0	2	0	29	6
Oldham Athletic	2009–10	League One	7	1	―		―		―		7	1
Carlisle United (loan)	2009–10	League One	9	4	―		―		―		9	4
Carlisle United	2010–11	League One	3	0	0	0	0	0	1	1	4	1
Carlisle United	Total		12	4	0	0	0	0	1	1	13	5
Bradford City (loan)	2010–11	League Two	10	1	1	0	―		―		11	1
Walsall (loan)	2010–11	League One	5	0	―		―		―		5	0
Hereford United (loan)	2010–11	League Two	4	0	―		―		―		4	0
Barnet	2011–12	League Two	5	1	―		2	0	―		7	1
Morecambe	2011–12	League Two	18	2	0	0	―		1	0	19	2
Guiseley	2011–12	Conference North	7	1	―		―		―		7	1
Prestatyn Town	2012–13	Welsh Premier League	28	11	4	3	―		―		32	14
Almondbury Woolpack	2016–17	Huddersfield and District Association League Third Division	4	4	―		―		―		4	4
Career total			499	87	29	12	21	2	22	9	571	110

== Honours ==
Swansea City

- Football League Third Division: 1999–2000

Hull City

- Football League One second-place promotion: 2004–05
- Football League Third Division second-place promotion: 2003–04

Doncaster Rovers

- Football League One play-offs: 2008
- Football League Trophy: 2006–07

Prestatyn Town

- Welsh Cup: 2012–13
