= Nicolas Fabiano =

French footballer (born 1981)

Personal information
- Full name: Nicolas Fabiano
- Date of birth: 8 February 1981 (age 45)
- Place of birth: Courbevoie, Hauts-de-Seine, France
- Height: 1.76 m (5 ft 9 in)
- Position: Midfielder

Senior career*
Years	Team	Apps	(Gls)
1999–2002	PSG	0	(0)
2001	→ Swansea City (loan)	6	(1)
2001–2002	→ Istres (loan)	6	(0)
2002–2003	Aberdeen	10	(0)
2004–2006	RCF Paris	13	(0)
2006–2008	Red Star Saint-Ouen	13	(0)
Total		48	(1)

International career
2001	France U-20		
- * Club domestic league appearances and goals

Nicolas Fabiano (born 8 February 1981) is a French former professional footballer who played as a midfielder.

== Career ==
Fabiano was born in Courbevoie, Hauts-de-Seine.

In 2002, he played top division football in the Scottish Premier League and UEFA Cup for Aberdeen.

He was without a club for one year, and then joined RCF Paris of Championnat National and left the club after they were relegated to CFA 2.

He was also included in the French U20 squad for the 2001 FIFA World Youth Championship.
