= Karl Munroe =

English footballer

Karl Munroe 5 ft 10
Personal information
- Full name: Karl Augustus Munroe
- Date of birth: 23 September 1979 (age 47)
- Place of birth: Manchester, England
- Position: Defender

Youth career
- 1994–1997: Swansea City

Senior career*
Years	Team	Apps	(Gls)
1997–1999	Swansea City	1	(0)
1999–2004	Macclesfield Town	119	(1)
2004–2005	Northwich Victoria	16	(0)
2005	Halifax Town	6	(0)
2005	Northwich Victoria	7	(0)
2005–2007	Altrincham	86	(2)
2007–2008	Droylsden	24	(1)
2008–2009	Hyde United	29	(0)
2010–2011	FC United of Manchester	17	(0)
- * Club domestic league appearances and goals as of 20:14, 9 November 2012 (UTC)

Karl Augustus Munroe (born 23 September 1979) is an English former footballer who played as a defender.

He had spells with Macclesfield Town making 119 league appearances, Altrincham, where he played 86 games scoring two goals and Hyde United.

== Career ==
=== Early career ===
Munroe started off playing for Oldham Athletic as a schoolboy. He also played for Manchester schoolboys alongside Manchester United player Wes Brown.

=== Swansea City ===
In 1994, he joined Swansea City as a schoolboy, in 1997 he broke through into the first team. He left them in 1999 having made only one senior appearance for the club.

=== Macclesfield Town ===
In summer 1999, Munroe joined Macclesfield Town where he stayed until 2004. In his five years with them he made a total of 119 league appearances, scoring one goal for the club, playing mostly in the centre of midfield. In summer of 2004, he left the club.

=== Altrincham ===
In summer 2005, Munroe joined Conference National newcomers Altrincham. He broke straight into the first team there, where he also played most of his games in central midfield. He stayed at the club until summer 2007, when he left the club having made a total of 86 appearances scoring two goals.

=== Droylsden ===
In summer 2007, He joined Conference North club Droylsden where he spent a season, mostly in the starting 11, but missed a few games through injury.

=== Hyde ===
In summer 2008, Munroe joined Conference North side Hyde United. He made his debut for the club in a 3–2 defeat to Alfreton Town on 8 August 2008. He spent a season at Hyde, making his last appearance for the club on 25 April 2009, in the 3–1 win over Solihull Moors in the last game of the 2008–09 Conference North season. He made a total of 33 appearances scoring once for the club in all competitions.

=== FC United of Manchester ===
In late August 2010, Munroe signed for Northern Premier League Premier Division outfit FC United of Manchester. He signed after appearing as a trialist for the club in pre season.
