= Martin Thomas (footballer, born 1973) =

English footballer

Personal information
- Position: Midfielder

Senior career*
Years	Team	Apps	(Gls)
1992–1994	Southampton	0	(0)
1994	Leyton Orient	5	(2)
1994–1998	Fulham	87	(8)
1998–2001	Swansea City	93	(8)
2001	Brighton & Hove Albion	8	(0)
2001–2002	Oxford United	14	(2)
2002–2004	Exeter City	36	(3)
	Eastleigh	?	(?)
	Winchester City	?	(?)
Total		243	(23)
- * Club domestic league appearances and goals

Martin Thomas is an English retired professional footballer who played as a midfielder for numerous teams in the Football League. During his spell at Swansea he is remembered for scoring the goal which knocked West Ham out of the FA Cup third round in January 1999.

== Honours ==
Swansea City

- Football League Third Division: 1999–2000
