= Nicolás Mazzina =

Argentine footballer

Personal information
- Full name: Jorge Nicolás Mazzina
- Date of birth: 31 January 1979 (age 47)
- Place of birth: Buenos Aires, Argentina
- Height: 5 ft 10 in (1.78 m)
- Position: Midfielder

Youth career
- ?–2000: Boca Juniors

Senior career*
Years	Team	Apps	(Gls)
2000–2001	Kimberley	29	(8)
2001–2002	Swansea City	3	(0)
2002	York City	3	(0)
2004–2009	Parador	43	(5)
2009–2010	Las Norias	7	(0)
- * Club domestic league appearances and goals

Jorge Nicolás Mazzina (born 31 January 1979), known as Nicolás Mazzina, is an Argentine retired footballer who played as a midfielder.

== Career ==
Born in Buenos Aires, Argentina, Mazzina made his way through the youth system at Boca Juniors, but after failing to make it into the first team he joined Kimberley in August 2000. After playing 29 games and scoring eight goals for the side, he joined Welsh side Swansea City in July 2001 after playing for them on trial. He was later told he was allowed to leave the club and in December he joined Motherwell of the Scottish Premier League on a one-week trial. He later had trials with Walsall and Livingston. He was released by Swansea in February 2002 after making four appearances for the club.

He went on trial with York City during pre-season in 2002, and despite picking up an injury was signed on by the club in August. His short-term contract was extended for a further month in September, but was released in October after making three appearances for the side. He resumed his career in regional Spanish football after joining Parador in 2004, and here he made 45 appearances and scored five goals in all competitions in five seasons. He then spent the 2009–10 season with Las Norias, where he made seven appearances.

== Career statistics ==
As of 15 November 2009.

Club	Season	League^{[A]}		Cup		League Cup		Other^{[B]}		Total	
Club	Season	Apps	Goals	Apps	Goals	Apps	Goals	Apps	Goals	Apps	Goals
Kimberley	2000–01	29	8	0	0	0	0	0	0	29	8
Swansea City	2001–02	3	0	0	0	1	0	0	0	4	0
York City	2002–03	3	0	0	0	0	0	0	0	3	0
Parador	2004–05	5	0	0	0	0	0	0	0	5	0
Parador	2005–06	6	0	0	0	0	0	0	0	6	0
Parador	2006–07	6	3	0	0	0	0	2	0	8	3
Parador	2007–08	13	1	0	0	0	0	0	0	13	1
Parador	2008–09	13	1	0	0	0	0	0	0	13	1
Parador	Total	43	5	0	0	0	0	2	0	45	5
Las Norias	2009–10	7	0	0	0	0	0	0	0	7	0
Career totals		85	13	0	0	1	0	2	0	88	13

== Footnotes ==
A. The "League" column constitutes appearances and goals (including those as a substitute) in the Football League and Divisiones Regionales de Fútbol in Andalusia.
B. The "Other" column constitutes appearances and goals (including those as a substitute) in the play-offs.
