= David Romo =

French footballer (born 1978)

Personal information
- Full name: David Romo
- Date of birth: 7 August 1978 (age 48)
- Place of birth: France
- Position: Midfielder

Senior career*
Years	Team	Apps	(Gls)
1995–2000	EA Guingamp		
2000–2002	Swansea City	43	(1)
- * Club domestic league appearances and goals

David Romo (born 7 August 1978) is a French former footballer who played in the Football League for Swansea City. Romo scored his only goal for Swansea in a 2–0 win over Mansfield Town in March 2002.
