= Steve Hamer (footballer) =

Welsh football chairman (born 1951)

Personal information
- Date of birth: 14 June 1951 (age 75)
- Place of birth: Glynneath, Wales
- Position: Central defender

Senior career*
Years	Team	Apps	(Gls)
1969–1971	Corinthian-Casuals		
1971–1972	Tooting & Mitcham United		
1972–1973	Sutton United		
1973–1975	Carshalton Athletic		
1975	Berea Park		
1976	Bromley		
1976–1978	Corinthian-Casuals		

Managerial career
- 1976–1977: Corinthian-Casuals
- * Club domestic league appearances and goals

Steve Hamer is a former chairman of both Swansea City and Bristol Rovers football clubs. He held the position at Bristol Rovers from February 2016 until November 2019, having previously been chairman of Swansea from 1997 to 2000.

== Playing career ==
Hamer played as a central defender in non-League football making his Isthmian League debut aged 18 against Clapton in 1970 for the Corinthian-Casuals. He left the Corinthian-Casuals in February 1971 and joined local rivals Tooting & Mitcham United. In 1972 Manager Sid Cann signed him for Sutton United. A serious knee injury kept him out of the game for most of that season before he rejoined former Tooting and Mitcham manager Doug Flack at Carshalton Athletic, where he was a teammate of future England national football team Manager Roy Hodgson.

In 1975, he left Carshalton Athletic and signed as a full-time professional for Berea Park based in Pretoria and playing in the National Football League. In the early part of 1976 for personal reasons he returned to the UK and signed for Bromley At the start of the 1976–77 season he became player/manager of the Corinthian-Casuals alongside Paul Sussams. In 1977 Sussams became the sole manager.

In 1978 due to a serious knee injury he was forced to retire from the game as a player.

== Administrative career ==
In 1981, Hamer joined London Weekend Television's Big Match programme working alongside Brian Moore for over 10 years, continuing to do so, even after acquiring the National Sporting Club from Lord Forte in 1987 which was based in the Cafe Royal, Piccadilly, London W1 with former Corinthian-Casuals goalkeeping teammate, past England cricket Captain Bob Willis.

He became chairman of Swansea City in 1997, but was sacked in September 2000 after losing the support of the management team at the Club because of his erratic behaviour. He later attgempted to justify his removal by saying he did not agree with the club owners' decision to seek a flotation for the club on the Stock Exchange AIM market. Thereafter he vociferously campaigned against the club and its owners until he was paid a substantial sum in order to agree to desist from his actions. For the record Hamer had never been a shareholder in the club or in its parent company Silver Shield Group. Given the campaign mounted by Hamer which coincided with the decision of ITV to close its subsidiary ITV digital, thereby removing funding from the club, Silver Shield exited.. The Board of Silver Shield who had just sold their main business to Kwik Fit on attractive terms decided to abandon their investment in Swansea, aFter attemopts to find other investors locally and nationally, and they handed the Club over for £1 to its commercial manager, who in turn passed the Club over some months later when destitute to Tony Petty. This also coincided with Swansea Council's decision to award a contract for the new Morfa Stadium to a developer, Miller, on a contract which would not see the new stadium built for another seven years.

In 2002, he sold his interest in the National Sporting Club and worked as a consultant in football club brokerage alongside Keith Harris until his appointment as Chairman of Bristol Rovers in February 2016.

Sporting positions
Preceded by Doug Sharpe	Swansea City A.F.C. chairman 1997–2000	Succeeded by Neil McClure
Preceded by Nick Higgs	Bristol Rovers F.C. chairman February 2016–November 2019	Succeeded by
