= Steve Jones (footballer, born December 1970) =

English footballer

Personal information
- Full name: Stephen Robert Jones
- Date of birth: 25 December 1970 (age 55)
- Place of birth: Bristol, England
- Position: Defender

Senior career*
Years	Team	Apps	(Gls)
	Wotton Rovers	?	(?)
	Fairford Town	?	(?)
	Forest Green Rovers	?	(?)
1994–1995	Cheltenham Town	?	(?)
1995–2001	Swansea City	146	(4)
2001–2003	Cheltenham Town	10	(0)
2003	Forest Green Rovers	11	(0)
2003–2009	Bath City	242	(6)
2009–2013	Bishop's Cleeve		
- * Club domestic league appearances and goals

Stephen Robert Jones (born 25 December 1970) is an English former footballer who played in the Football League for Swansea City and Cheltenham Town.

== Career ==
Jones played locally in Gloucestershire for Wotton Rovers as well as for Fairford Town before joining Forest Green Rovers. He then joined Cheltenham Town before earning a £25,000 move to Swansea City. He was part of the Swansea side that reached the Third Division play-off final in the 1996–97 season and the following season overcame a broken leg to help Swansea reach the play-offs again under manager John Hollins. In the following 1999–2000 season Jones featured heavily again as Swansea were crowned Third Division champions.

In 2001, Jones returned to Cheltenham Town who were now in the Football League however he was again hit by injuries including another broken leg and in 2003 he was released by manager Bobby Gould.

Jones then returned to Forest Green Rovers who were by now competing in the Conference National. Jones made just 11 appearances for Forest Green under manager Colin Addison.

He then moved to Twerton Park to sign for Bath City where he made 242 appearances between 2003 and 2009 before being released.

He then signed for Southern League side Bishops Cleeve in the summer of 2009. Following the departure of long serving manager Paul Collicutt at the end of the 2010/11 season, Jones was elevated to player-assistant manager following the promotion of Alex Sykes to manager. He left the club, alongside Sykes, in April 2013.

== Honours ==
Swansea City

- Football League Third Division: 1999–2000
