= Leigh De-Vulgt =

Welsh footballer

Personal information
- Full name: Leigh Stewart De-Vulgt
- Date of birth: 17 March 1981 (age 45)
- Place of birth: Swansea, Wales
- Position: Defender

Youth career
- Swansea City

Senior career*
Years	Team	Apps	(Gls)
1999–2002	Swansea City	23	(0)
2002	Llanelli	2	(1)
2002	Merthyr Tydfil		
2002–2004	Carmarthen Town	41	(0)
2004–2016	Port Talbot Town	321	(4)
2016–2018	Afan Lido		

International career^{‡}
1998–1999	Wales U18	8	(0)
2001	Wales U21	2	(0)
- * Club domestic league appearances and goals as of 14:30, 1 August 2016 (UTC) ‡ National team caps and goals as of 21:59, 25 March 2016 (UTC)

Leigh Stewart De-Vulgt (born 17 March 1981) is a Welsh footballer.

== Career ==
=== Swansea City ===
A Welsh youth and under-21 international, De-Vulgt began his career with his hometown club Swansea City, progressing through the youth ranks before making his professional debut on 26 December 1999 as a late substitute in place of Lee Jenkins during a 1–0 victory over Leyton Orient. He went on to make 23 league appearances for the club over four years before being released from his contract in December 2002 by new head coach Brian Flynn to clear room for new signings.

=== Welsh Premier League ===
After brief spells with Llanelli and Merthyr Tydfil, De-Vulgt spent two seasons at Carmarthen Town. In 2004, he moved to fellow Welsh Premier League side Port Talbot Town and has remained at the club since, making over 250 league appearances and finishing as runner-up in the 2010 Welsh Cup Final. In 2013, De-Vulgt was awarded the Welsh Premier League Clubman of the Year award for his long service to Port Talbot.

He left Port Talbot in 2016 after 12 years with the side, joining Afan Lido as player-coach, where he played for two seasons before officially announced his retirement from professional football on 1 July 2018, at the age of 37.

== Personal life ==
De-Vulgt is the brother-in-law of former Wales international John Hartson having married his sister Vicky.

== Honours ==
=== Club ===
Port Talbot Town

- Welsh Cup Finalist: 2009–10

=== Individual ===
- Welsh Premier League Clubman of the Year: 2013
