= Craig Draper =

Welsh footballer

Personal information
- Date of birth: 4 December 1982 (age 43)
- Place of birth: Swansea, Wales
- Height: 5 ft 8 in (1.73 m)
- Position: Midfielder

Youth career
- 2000–2001: Swansea City

Senior career*
Years	Team	Apps	(Gls)
2001–2002	Swansea City	2	(0)
2002	Llanelli	7	(0)
- Winch Wen
- Garden Village
- Winch Wen
Total		9	(0)
- * Club domestic league appearances and goals

Craig Draper (born 4 December 1982) is a Welsh former professional footballer who played as a midfielder.

== Career ==
=== Club career ===
Draper began his career with Swansea City, making 2 appearances in the Football League between 2001 and 2002. After leaving Swansea, Draper played for Llanelli.
