= Damien Lacey =

Welsh footballer

Personal information
- Full name: Damien James Lacey
- Date of birth: 3 August 1977 (age 49)
- Place of birth: Bridgend, Wales
- Height: 5 ft 9 in (1.75 m)
- Position: Midfielder

Senior career*
Years	Team	Apps	(Gls)
1996–2003	Swansea City	104	(3)
- * Club domestic league appearances and goals

Damien Lacey (born 3 August 1977) is a Welsh former footballer who played in the Football League for Swansea City. He was born in Bridgend.

== Career ==
He played as a midfielder and at right back. In 2001—along with seven other players—he took a pay cut due to the troubles throughout the Third Division Club. This was more than 70 percent.

== Honours ==
Swansea City

- Football League Third Division: 1999–2000
