= Andrew Mumford (footballer) =

Welsh footballer

Personal information
- Full name: Andrew Owen Mumford
- Date of birth: 18 June 1981 (age 45)
- Place of birth: Neath, Wales
- Positions: Defender; midfielder

Youth career
- Llanelli

Senior career*
Years	Team	Apps	(Gls)
1998–2000	Llanelli	28	(8)
1999–2004	Swansea City	63	(6)
2000	→ Haverfordwest County (loan)	24	(8)
2001	→ Port Talbot Athletic (loan)	5	(3)
2003	→ Newport County (loan)	21	(7)
2003-2004	→ Aldershot Town (loan)	7	(5)
2004	Port Talbot Athletic	3	(0)
2004–2005	Aberystwyth Town	13	(0)
2004–2005	Port Talbot Athletic	16	(2)
2005–2006	Sydney FC		
2007–2010	Llanelli	116	(21)
2010–2011	Afan Lido	0	(0)
2011–2012	Haverfordwest County		(0)

Managerial career
- 2022–2023: Trefelin BGC
- * Club domestic league appearances and goals

Andrew Owen Mumford (born 18 June 1981) is a Welsh retired footballer

== Life and career ==
Having come up through the age groups at LLanelli Town under the tutelage of former Welsh international Leighton James, Mumford passed up a short-term contract offer from Newcastle United in order to sign with Swansea City (where James himself spent several years as a player) in the summer of 2000.

Short spells on loan at Haverfordwest County and Port Talbot Athletic that season saw him gain further first team experience before he made his Swansea debut at Port Vale in April 2001.

The following season saw Mumford become a regular and end it as the clubs youngest ever player of the year as the team narrowly avoided relegation from the Football League.

Several injuries curtailed his development however and following further loan periods to Newport County and Aldershot Town his contract was allowed to expire and he moved to Australia to play for Sydney FC in the inaugural A-League season.

After just one season in Australia he moved back to Wales, with stints at Welsh League teams Port Talbot Athletic, LLanelli Town, Afan Lido and Haverfordwest County before retiring in 2012.
