= 2001–02 FAW Premier Cup =

Tournament details
- Country: England; Wales
- Teams: 12

Final positions
- Champions: Cardiff City
- Runner-up: Swansea City

The 2001–02 FAW Premier Cup was the fifth season of the tournament since its founding in 1997.

== Group A ==
Home	Score	Away
Caersws	5 - 0	Aberystwyth Town
Caersws	1 - 1	Total Network Solutions
Aberystwyth Town	2 - 1	Total Network Solutions
Newtown	1 - 1	Caersws
Total Network Solutions	2 - 1	Aberystwyth Town
Newtown	3 - 0	Aberystwyth Town
Total Network Solutions	0 - 2	Caersws
Caersws	2 - 0	Newtown
Aberystwyth Town	3 - 1	Newtown
Aberystwyth Town	0 - 1	Caersws
Total Network Solutions	0 - 2	Newtown
Newtown	2 - 3	Total Network Solutions

Team	Pld	W	D	L	GF	GA	GD	Pts
Caersws	6	4	2	0	12	2	+10	14
Newtown	6	2	1	3	8	8	0	7
Total Network Solutions	6	2	1	3	7	10	−3	7
Aberystwyth Town	6	2	0	4	6	13	−7	6

== Group B ==
Home	Score	Away
Carmarthen Town	2 - 0	Rhyl
Cwmbran Town	0 - 1	Carmarthen Town
Carmarthen Town	0 - 1	Newport County
Cwmbran Town	2 - 3	Rhyl
Rhyl	1 - 2	Carmarthen Town
Rhyl	1 - 1	Cwmbran Town
Newport County	0 - 0	Rhyl
Carmarthen Town	1 - 0	Cwmbran Town
Newport County	0 - 0	Carmarthen Town
Cwmbran Town	2 - 3	Newport County
Newport County	2 - 0	Cwmbran Town
Rhyl	1 - 2	Newport County

Team	Pld	W	D	L	GF	GA	GD	Pts
Newport County	6	4	2	0	8	3	+5	14
Rhyl	6	4	1	1	6	2	+4	13
Carmarthen Town	6	1	2	3	6	9	−3	5
Cwmbran Town	6	0	1	5	5	11	−6	1

== Quarter finals ==
Home	Score	Away
Caersws	0 - 3	Barry Town
Carmarthen Town	2 - 4	Wrexham
Newport County	0 - 3	Swansea
Newtown	0 - 3	Cardiff City

== Semi finals ==
Home	Score	Away
Wrexham	1 - 1	Cardiff City
Swansea City	2 - 0	Barry Town

== Final ==
Home	Score	Away
Cardiff City	1 - 0	Swansea
