= Jason Smith (English footballer) =

English footballer

Personal information
- Date of birth: 6 September 1974 (age 52)
- Place of birth: Bromsgrove, England
- Position: Defender

Senior career*
Years	Team	Apps	(Gls)
1993–1995	Coventry City	0	(0)
1995–1998	Tiverton Town	0	(0)
1998–2003	Swansea City	142	(8)
- * Club domestic league appearances and goals

Jason Smith (born 6 September 1974) is an English former footballer who played in the Football League for Swansea City.

== Honours ==
Swansea City

- Football League Third Division: 1999–2000
