= Michael Howard (footballer, born 1978) =

English footballer

Personal information
- Full name: Michael Anthony Howard
- Date of birth: 2 December 1978 (age 47)
- Place of birth: Birkenhead, England
- Height: 5 ft 9 in (1.75 m)
- Position: Defender

Youth career
- 1994–1996: Liverpool
- 1996–1997: Tranmere Rovers

Senior career*
Years	Team	Apps	(Gls)
1997–1998	Tranmere Rovers	0	(0)
1998–2004	Swansea City	228	(2)
2004–2009	Morecambe	95	(1)
2008	→ Oxford United (loan)	17	(1)
2009–2010	Llanelli	13	(0)
2010–2012	Aberystwyth Town	45	(0)
2012–?	Afan Lido		
- * Club domestic league appearances and goals as of 20:08, 2 May 2010 (UTC)

Michael Anthony Howard (born 2 December 1978) is an English footballer who plays as a defender.

== Career ==
Born in Birkenhead, Merseyside, Howard initially started his career with Liverpool before being signed as a trainee by Tranmere Rovers. He was signed by Jim Harvey for Morecambe from Swansea City, where he had been a regular for 6 seasons, at the start of the 2004–05 season.

His consistent performances at left-back saw him win the 'Junior Red of the Year' award at the award ceremony at the end of the 2005–06 season. This award was voted for by members of the Morecambe Junior Reds Supporters' Club.

In January 2008, Howard joined Oxford United on a short-term loan deal. He was released by Morecambe in May 2009 and subsequently joined Welsh Premier side Llanelli, making his debut in the Europa League victory against Motherwell. In July 2010, Howard joined Aberystwyth Town.

In June 2012 he joined Afan Lido.

== Honours ==
Swansea City

- Football League Third Division: 1999–2000
