= Stuart Roberts (footballer, born 1980) =

Welsh footballer

Personal information
- Date of birth: 22 July 1980 (age 46)
- Place of birth: Carmarthen, Wales
- Position: Midfielder

Team information
- Current team: Carmarthen Town

Youth career
- 19??–1998: Swansea City

Senior career*
Years	Team	Apps	(Gls)
1998–2001	Swansea City	94	(14)
2001–2004	Wycombe Wanderers	70	(4)
2004	Swansea City	12	(1)
2004	Chester City	0	(0)
2004	Kidderminster Harriers	5	(1)
2004–2005	Forest Green Rovers	19	(0)
2005–2008	Aberystwyth Town	89	(15)
2008–	Carmarthen Town	36	(5)
- * Club domestic league appearances and goals as of 2 May 2010

Stuart Roberts (born 22 July 1980) is a Welsh former professional footballer. He is a midfielder and currently with Carmarthen Town. He has represented Wales at Under-21 level.

Roberts began his career as a trainee with Swansea City, turning professional in August 1998. His first team debut came on 11 August 1998 when he was a late substitute for Jon Coates in the 1–1 draw at home to Norwich City in the League Cup. His league debut came four days later in the 2–1 defeat away to Cambridge United, this time as a second-half substitute for Ryan Casey.

With Swansea in the midst of a financial crisis, Roberts spent part of the 2001 pre-season on trial with Rotherham United and moved to Wycombe Wanderers in October 2001 for a fee of £100,000. He remained with Wycombe until February 2004 when he returned to Swansea, initially on loan, but a month later on a free transfer. He later claimed that his time at Wycombe under Lawrie Sanchez had 'destroyed him as a player and a person'.

Released at the end of the season, he joined Chester City on a non-contract basis in June 2004.

Roberts joined Kidderminster Harriers in August 2004, but was released a month later and joined Forest Green Rovers. He was released by Forest Green at the end of the 2004–05 season.

In July 2005 he returned to Wales, joining Aberystwyth Town, where he was a regular for three years before joining Carmarthen Town in August 2008.
