= Ritchie Appleby =

English footballer

Personal information
- Full name: Richard Dean Appleby
- Date of birth: 18 September 1975 (age 51)
- Place of birth: Middlesbrough, England
- Height: 5 ft 9 in (1.75 m)
- Positions: Midfielder; striker

Youth career
- ?–1993: Newcastle United

Senior career*
Years	Team	Apps	(Gls)
1993–1995	Newcastle United	0	(0)
1994	→ Darlington (loan)	0	(0)
1995–1996	Ipswich Town	3	(0)
1996–2001	Swansea City	120	(11)
2001	→ Kidderminster Harriers (loan)	3	(1)
2001–2002	Kidderminster Harriers	16	(3)
2002–2004	Hull City	6	(0)
2004	Kidderminster Harriers	9	(1)
2004–2005	Forest Green Rovers	7	(0)
2006–2008	Llanelli	12	(0)
Total		176	(15)

International career
1993	England U18	1	(0)
- * Club domestic league appearances and goals

Richard Dean Appleby (born 18 September 1975) is an English former professional footballer who played in either midfield or as a forward.

Having come through the Newcastle United academy, he went on to notably play for Swansea City where he made 120 league appearances. He also played professionally for Darlington, Ipswich Town, Kidderminster Harriers and Hull City. He finished his career with spells with non-league side Forest Green Rovers and Llanelli.

== Playing career ==
He began his professional career for Newcastle United's youth team in August 1994, and was signed on loan to Darlington for a year. Appleby signed for Ipswich Town in December 1995, then nine months later signed with Swansea City. He spent five years at Swansea, making a total of 139 appearances and scoring 14 goals.

From November 2001 until June 2002 Appleby played for Kidderminster Harriers, then joined Hull City for two years. With Hull City, he fell out of favour with supporters due to claims of being injured, contradicting the opinions of both club medical staff and manager Peter Taylor. He then left to rejoin Kidderminster, spending two months there before joining Forest Green Rovers in October 2004. He left Forest Green in May 2005, and then signed for Welsh Premier League full timers Llanelli in March 2006. He later played at amateur level for Pontarddulais Town FC, as a second striker.

== International career ==
Appleby was capped once by England U18 in 1993.

== Honours ==
Swansea City

- Football League Third Division: 1999–2000
