= Steve Watkin (footballer) =

Welsh footballer

Personal information
- Full name: Stephen Watkin
- Date of birth: 16 June 1971 (age 55)
- Place of birth: Wrexham, Wales
- Position: Striker

Youth career
- Wrexham

Senior career*
| Years | Team | Apps | (Gls) |
| 1989–1997 | Wrexham | 204 | (57) |
| 1997–2003 | Swansea City | 207 | (44) |
| 2003–2006 | Caernarfon Town | 63 | (15) |
| 2006–2007 | NEWI Cefn Druids | 22 | (3) |
| Total | | 496 | (119) |

International career
| 1992 | Wales B | 2 | (0) |
- * Club domestic league appearances and goals

Stephen Watkin (born 16 June 1971) is a Welsh former professional footballer who played as a striker. He is best known for the goal he scored to secure a 2–1 victory for Wrexham over Arsenal in a FA Cup third round tie in 1992. At the time Arsenal were the reigning Division One champions, whilst Wrexham were a Division Four side. He later signed for Swansea City for £108,000, before finishing his career in the Welsh Premier League. He later became an accountant for a local firm.

== Honours ==
Swansea City

- Football League Third Division: 1999–2000
