= Jason Wyn-Jones =

Welsh footballer

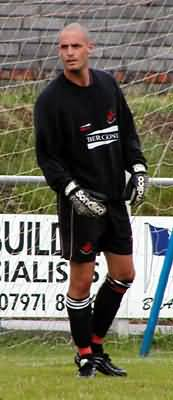

Personal information
- Full name: Jason Andrew Wyn-Jones
- Date of birth: 10 May 1979 (age 47)
- Place of birth: Wrexham, Wales
- Height: 6 ft 2 in (1.88 m)
- Position: Goalkeeper

Team information
- Current team: Viking (goalkeeping coach)

Youth career
- 19xx–1997: Liverpool

Senior career*
Years	Team	Apps	(Gls)
1997–2002	Swansea City	10	(0)
1997	→ Rhayader Town (loan)		
1998	→ Rhyl (loan)	1	(0)
2002–2003	Llanelli	7	(0)
Total		18	(0)

International career
- Wales U21
- * Club domestic league appearances and goals

Jason Andrew Wyn-Jones (ne Jones; born 10 May 1979) is a Welsh football coach and former player who is the goalkeeping coach of Eliteserien club Viking.

== Career ==
=== Club career ===
After playing youth football with Liverpool, Wyn-Jones began his senior career with Swansea City, making 10 appearances in the Football League between 1997 and 2002. While at Swansea, Wyn-Jones spent a loan spell with both Rhayader Town, and Rhyl. After leaving Swansea, Wyn-Jones later played with Llanelli.

=== International career ===
Wyn-Jones represented Wales at under-21 level.

=== Coaching career ===
In 2017, he started working at the youth academy of Sandnes Ulf. In January 2019, he was appointed first team goalkeeping coach at the club. After the 2023 season, he left Sandnes Ulf to become a goalkeeping coach at the youth academy of Viking. In November 2024, Wyn-Jones was appointed first team goalkeeping coach of Viking, starting from January 2025.
