= Roger Freestone =

Welsh footballer and manager

Personal information
- Full name: Roger Freestone
- Date of birth: 19 August 1968 (age 58)
- Place of birth: Caerleon, Wales
- Height: 6 ft 2 in (1.88 m)
- Position: Goalkeeper

Senior career*
Years	Team	Apps	(Gls)
1986–1987	Newport County	13	(0)
1987–1991	Chelsea	42	(0)
1989	→ Swansea City (loan)	14	(0)
1990	→ Hereford United (loan)	8	(0)
1991–2004	Swansea City	552	(3)
2004	Newport County	14	(0)
Total		643	(3)

International career
1990	Wales U21	1	(0)
2000	Wales	1	(0)

Managerial career
- 2002: Swansea City
- * Club domestic league appearances and goals

Roger Freestone (born 19 August 1968) is a Welsh former international footballer who played as a goalkeeper. He has the distinction of being one of a relatively small group of footballers to play 500 English Football League matches for one club, the only other Welshmen being Ryan Giggs, Neville Southall, Herbie Williams and Len Weare.

== Club career ==
Born in Caerleon, near Newport, Monmouthshire, Freestone began his career at Newport County as a trainee before moving to Chelsea in 1987 for £95,000. During his time there he was never the established first choice, being behind Eddie Niedzwiecki, Kevin Hitchcock and Dave Beasant, and was loaned out to Swansea City and Hereford United. He eventually joined Swansea on a permanent deal in 1991, for a fee of £45,000, and went on to spend over a decade, the majority of his career, at the Welsh club.

In 2001 a rumoured move to rivals Cardiff City was met with anger from Swansea fans as they did not want to lose him. He left the club after thirteen years and went on to sign for Newport County in 2004, but his contract was cancelled several months later by mutual consent owing to recurring injury problems and he eventually retired.

The way in which he left Swansea City angered a lot of fans. Then-manager Kenny Jackett said he made a tough choice in releasing Roger Freestone and the supporters felt they had missed an opportunity to give a proper send-off that he deserved for his contribution.

Freestone is considered a legend among Swansea fans. In 1995, he briefly became the clubs penalty taker, where he converted three out of three spot-kicks. His talent as a shot stopper lead to him keeping 22 clean sheets in a season, which was a club record, until Dorus de Vries broke the record in the 2009–10 season.

== International career ==
Freestone played for Wales at schoolboy, under-21 and B level before winning his first and only cap against Brazil in 2000.

== Management career ==
Freestone had a short-lived stint as manager at Swansea along with Nick Cusack. He currently manages youth side, Risca & Gelli United in the Islwyn Youth League.

== Personal life ==
Upon retiring from football in 2004, Freestone began working as a delivery driver for Tuffnells. In an interview with Swansea City's official website in 2016, Freestone confirmed that he was still working in the same delivery role.

== Career statistics ==
Club performance			League		Cup				Total	
Season	Club	League	Apps	Goals	Apps	Goals	Apps	Goals	Apps	Goals
England			League		FA Cup		League Cup		Total	
1986–87	Newport County	Division 3	13	0	—		—		13	0
1986–87	Chelsea	Division 1	6	0	—				6	0
1987–88	Chelsea	Division 1	15	0	2	0	—		17	0
1988–89	Chelsea	Division 2	21	0	—		2	0	23	0
1989–90	Chelsea	Division 1	0	0	—		—		0	0
1989–90	Hereford United (Loan)	Division 4	8	0	—		—		8	0
1989–90	Swansea City (Loan)	Division 3	14	0	—		—		14	0
1990–91	Chelsea	Division 1	0	0	—		—		0	0
1991–92	Swansea City	Division 3	42	0	—		—		42	0
1992–93	Swansea City	Division 2	46	0	—		—		46	0
1993–94	Swansea City	Division 2	46	0	—		—		46	0
1994–95	Swansea City	Division 2	45	1	—		2	0	47	1
1995–96	Swansea City	Division 2	45	2	—		—		45	2
1996–97	Swansea City	Division 3	45	0	0	0	2	0	47	0
1997–98	Swansea City	Division 3	43	0	1	0	2	0	46	0
1998–99	Swansea City	Division 3	38	0	5	0	2	0	45	0
1999–2000	Swansea City	Division 3	46	0	2	0	4	0	52	0
2000–01	Swansea City	Division 2	43	0	1	0	2	0	46	0
2001–02	Swansea City	Division 3	43	0	2	0	1	0	46	0
2002–03	Swansea City	Division 3	33	0	1	0	1	0	35	0
2003–04	Swansea City	Division 3	37	0	5	0	0	0	42	0
2004–05	Newport County	Conference South	14	0	—		—		14	0
Total	England		643	3	19	0	18	0	680	3
Career total			643	3	19	0	18	0	680	3

== Honours ==
Chelsea

- Football League Second Division: 1988–89

Swansea City

- Football League Third Division: 1999–2000
- Football League Trophy: 1993–94
- FAW Premier Cup runner-up: 2000–01, 2001–02
