= Kristian O'Leary =

Welsh footballer and manager

Personal information
- Full name: Kristian Denis O'Leary
- Date of birth: 30 August 1977 (age 49)
- Place of birth: Port Talbot, Wales
- Height: 5 ft 11 in (1.80 m)
- Positions: Midfielder; defender

Team information
- Current team: Swansea City (first team coach)

Youth career
- 1992–1995: Swansea City

Senior career*
Years	Team	Apps	(Gls)
1995–2010	Swansea City	281	(10)
2006	→ Cheltenham Town (loan)	5	(1)
2009	→ Leyton Orient (loan)	3	(0)
2010	Wrexham	8	(0)
2010–2012	Neath	24	(4)
Total		321	(15)

Managerial career
- 2011–2012: Neath
- 2012–2015: Swansea City Under 21s
- 2018–2019: Atlantic City FC
- 2019–2021: Carmarthen Town
- 2021–2022: Swansea City Under 23s
- * Club domestic league appearances and goals

Kristian Denis O'Leary (born 30 August 1977) is a Welsh football coach and former professional footballer. He is best known for his spells both as a player and coach at Swansea City. He formerly managed Welsh sides Carmarthen Town and Neath, and American soccer club Atlantic City. He is currently first team coach at Swansea City.

== Playing career ==
Born in Port Talbot, O'Leary began his career as a trainee at Swansea City, having signed for the club as a schoolboy at the age of 14 in 1992. He made his professional debut for the club during the 1995–96 season. His favoured position is in midfield, although he has also played in central defence and at right-back. O'Leary spent part of the 2002–03 season as the club captain.

O'Leary was a one club man until November 2006 when he joined Cheltenham Town on a month's loan, later turning down the chance to move to the club on a permanent basis. In August 2009, he moved to Leyton Orient on a one-month loan deal, making three appearances before returning to Swansea. Having made over 300 appearances for Swansea City in a spell lasting nearly 15 years, O'Leary left the club by mutual consent on 2 February 2010. After a spell training with Hereford United, on 17 March he turned out as a trialist for Wrexham reserves against Preston North End reserves after training with the Conference side the week before. On 26 March 2010 he signed an initial one-month contract with the club with a view to a longer deal, making his debut the following day in a 3–0 win over Histon.

On 12 July 2010, he joined Welsh Premier League side Neath. The club stated that "Kris is invaluable to add steel and direction to a young squad in readiness for next season".

== Coaching career ==
On 15 November 2011, he was named caretaker manager after the departures of Neath' management team. He left the club at the end of the season following the club's liquidation.

On 4 July 2012, he rejoined Swansea City, this time head coach of the newly formed U21 squad. His job at Swansea would involve coaching the young professionals as manager of the reserve team. In February 2014, he moved positions within the club to start working with the first team and he was made assistant first team coach, where he remained until December 2015.

On 9 December 2015, O'Leary left his position at Swansea City, along with Pep Clotet and James Beattie, following the sacking of manager Garry Monk.

In March 2018, O'Leary was appointed Head Coach of the newly formed NSPL side Atlantic City FC. In November 2019 he was appointed manager of Carmarthen Town. In 2021, he returned to Swansea City as manager of the club's U23s.During the closing of the 2021–22 season, O' Leary was regularly seen in the dugout with Swansea City and Russell Martin (footballer), he also helped out during the 2022–23, pre season trip to Penyhill Park.

On 6 July 2022, O'Leary was appointed first team coach at Swansea ahead of the 2022/23 season.

== Honours ==
Swansea City

- Football League Third Division: 1999–2000
- Football League Trophy: 2005–06
