= Nick Cusack =

English footballer

Personal information
- Full name: Nicholas John Cusack
- Date of birth: 24 December 1965 (age 60)
- Place of birth: Maltby, England
- Height: 1.83 m (6 ft 0 in)
- Position: Midfielder

Senior career*
Years	Team	Apps	(Gls)
1986–1987	Alvechurch		
1987–1988	Leicester City	16	(1)
1988–1989	Peterborough United	44	(10)
1989–1992	Motherwell	77	(17)
1992	Darlington	21	(6)
1992–1994	Oxford United	61	(10)
1994	→ Wycombe Wanderers (loan)	4	(0)
1994–1997	Fulham	112	(14)
1997–2002	Swansea City	200	(13)
Total		535	(71)

Managerial career
- 2002: Swansea City (player-manager)
- * Club domestic league appearances and goals

Nicholas John Cusack (born 24 December 1965 in Maltby, West Riding of Yorkshire) is an English former footballer and, briefly, player-manager. He was for a time chairman of the Professional Footballers' Association (PFA), and is now an Assistant Chief Executive.

== Football career ==
In October 1997 Cusack joined Swansea City from Fulham for a fee of £50,000.

After a period as caretaker manager, he was appointed player-coach in April 2002, but after just 17 games in charge he was replaced by Brian Flynn; he turned down an offer to remain on the coaching staff, and left in September 2002 with the club at the bottom of the Football League.

Cusack was Swansea's PFA representative, and was elected chairman of the Association, succeeding Barry Horne, in November 2001. He was active in the PFA's opposition to a reduction of professional clubs in the league pyramid.

In 2016, Cusack was elected to the General Council of the Trades Union Congress.

== Managerial statistics ==
Team	From	To	Record				
Team	From	To	G	W	L	D	Win %
Swansea City	12 April 2002	20 September 2002	17	2	10	5	11.8

== Honours ==
Swansea City

- Football League Third Division: 1999–2000

Individual

- PFA Team of the Year: 1999–2000 Third Division
