= Lee Jenkins (footballer, born 1979) =

Welsh footballer

Personal information
- Date of birth: 28 June 1979 (age 47)
- Place of birth: Pontypool, Wales
- Positions: Midfielder; right back

Youth career
- –1995: Swansea City

Senior career*
Years	Team	Apps	(Gls)
1995–2003	Swansea City	187	(4)
2003–2005	Kidderminster Harriers	58	(0)
2005	Redditch United	22	(3)
2006	Newport County	38	(2)
2009–2010	Caersws	39	(1)
2010–2011	Carmarthen Town	28	(0)

International career
	Wales U21s	12	(1)
- * Club domestic league appearances and goals

Lee Jenkins (born 28 June 1979) is a Welsh former footballer who played for Swansea City for over eight years.

== Playing career ==
Jenkins progressed through the Swansea City set-up from 12 years old to the youth team and was a first team regular for many seasons mainly in midfield or at rightback. A nasty cheekbone and eye socket facture during a FA cup match vs Bristol city ended a big money move to Newcastle United in 1996, However Lee did go on win a championship medal in 2000 and played a vital part in Swansea great escape in 2003, Lee was an unsung hero. He then moved to Kidderminster Harriers to rejoin Jan Mølby and taking his total of league appearances beyond 200. He signed for Newport County in October 2005 after a brief spell at Redditch United. He left Newport in February 2007 after a series of bad knee injuries. After playing for Caersws during the 2009–10 season, Jenkins signed for Carmarthen Town in June 2010. Jenkins earned Welsh representative honours from schoolboy up to under-21 level. He earned 12 under 21s caps playing alongside the likes of Craig Bellamy, Simon Davies, Danny Gabbidon, Matthew Jones and Rob Earnshaw.

== Honours ==
Swansea City

- Football League Third Division: 1999–2000
