= Jonathan Coates =

Welsh footballer

Personal information
- Full name: Jonathan Simon Coates
- Date of birth: 27 June 1975 (age 51)
- Place of birth: Swansea, Wales
- Position: Midfielder

Youth career
- 19xx–1993: Swansea City

Senior career*
Years	Team	Apps	(Gls)
1993–2002	Swansea City	250	(23)
1994–1995	→ Barry Town (loan)	4	(0)
2002	Cheltenham Town	0	(0)
2002	Woking		
2002	Carmarthen Town	1	(0)
2002–2004	Swansea City	30	(0)
2004–2005	Newport County	25	(1)
2005–2006	Aberystwyth Town	33	(6)
2006	Port Talbot Town	3	(0)
2006	Morriston Town		
2006–2008	Haverfordwest County	51	(2)
Total		372	(31)

International career
1995–1997	Wales U21	5	(1)
1999	Wales B	1	(0)
- * Club domestic league appearances and goals

Jonathan Simon Coates (born 27 June 1975) is a Welsh former professional footballer who played as a left winger.

== Career ==
Coates made 280 appearances in the Football League in two spells for Swansea City, and also spent time with Barry Town, Cheltenham Town, Woking, Carmarthen Town, Newport County, Aberystwyth Town, Port Talbot Town, Morriston Town and Haverfordwest County.

== Honours ==
Swansea City

- Football League Third Division: 1999–2000
