= Ryan Casey =

Footballer (born 1979)

Personal information
- Full name: Ryan Casey
- Date of birth: 3 January 1979 (age 47)
- Place of birth: Coventry, England
- Position: Left-back

Youth career
- –1996: Galway Hibernians
- 1996–1997: Swansea City

Senior career*
Years	Team	Apps	(Gls)
1997–2002	Swansea City	68	(2)
2002–2003	St Patrick's Athletic		
2003	Cork City		
2004–2005	Galway United		
2006	Melbourne Knights		
2007	Athlone Town		
2008	Longford Town		

International career
1998	Republic of Ireland U18	2	(0)
1999	Republic of Ireland U20	2	(0)

Managerial career
- 2022–2026: Sligo Rovers (assistant)
- 2026: Sligo Rovers (interim)
- 2026–: Shelbourne (assistant)
- * Club domestic league appearances and goals

Ryan Casey (born 3 January 1979) is a former professional footballer who played as left-back. Ryan was appointed as the FAI Development Officer for Sligo in July 2007. He spent most of his career with Swansea City. Born in England, he played for the Republic of Ireland U18 national team.

== Playing career ==
Casey began his career with Swansea City having signed as a 17-year-old from Galway Hibernians.

He also played for St Patrick's Athletic, Cork City, Galway United, Athlone Town and Longford Town.

Casey was part of the so-called "golden generation" of Republic of Ireland youth football of the late 1990s. Under the guidance of Brian Kerr, the unfancied Republic won the UEFA U-16 and U-18 European championships in 1998, and Ryan was part of the victorious U-18 side in Cyprus. In 1999, he played at the World Youth Cup in Nigeria, where the Republic reached the last 16 before going out on penalties to the hosts.

== Coaching career ==
Having originally coached with Castlebar Celtic, Casey then coached in the Sligo Rovers academy from 2019 to 2022 when he was appointed first-team assistant manager under manager John Russell and remained in the role from 2022 to July 2026, when Russell departed the club to take up the role as manager of Shelbourne, with Casey acting as interim manager of Sligo Rovers for a 4–0 win over Janesboro in the FAI Cup. The following week after Russell's departure, Casey followed him to Shelbourne, again becoming his assistant manager.

== Honours ==
Republic of Ireland

- UEFA European Under-18 Championship: 1998
