= 1999–2000 Football League =

101st season of the Football League

The Football League
- Season: 1999–2000
- Champions: Charlton Athletic
- Promoted: Charlton Athletic; Manchester City; Ipswich Town
- Relegated: Chester City
- New Club in League: Cheltenham Town

The 1999–2000 Football League (known as the Nationwide Football League for sponsorship reasons) was the 101st completed season of The Football League.

The 1999–2000 season saw the league dispense with the traditional 1–11 numbering of players’ shirts in favour of squad numbers, a system that had been adopted by the Premier League a few seasons before. This also meant that players’ names appeared on the back of their shirts for the first time since the league’s inception.

The three promotion places in Division One went to champions Charlton Athletic, runners-up Manchester City and playoff winners Ipswich Town.

1999–2000 also saw some of Division One’s biggest clubs miss out on promotion — the biggest of these were Blackburn Rovers (11th) and Nottingham Forest (14th). Steve Coppell ended his fourth spell as Crystal Palace manager after doing wonders to keep a virtually bankrupt club clear of the Division One relegation zone.

Going down were Walsall, Port Vale and Swindon Town. West Bromwich Albion just missed out on the drop zone thanks to a late turn-around in form during the final weeks of the season which followed the appointment of Gary Megson as manager.

David Moyes, 37, showed promise as one of the league’s most highly rated young managers after he guided Preston North End to the Division Two championship. Stan Ternent’s two-year rebuilding project at Burnley paid off as they finished runners-up in the division and would establish themselves as a second tier side for nine years until promotion to the Premier League happened at the end of the 2008–09 season. Joining them in Division One were Peter Taylor’s Gillingham, who had reached the upper half of the league for the first time in their history.

Going down were Cardiff City, Blackpool, Scunthorpe United and Chesterfield. Narrowly avoiding the drop were Oxford United, who struggled all season long despite the club’s financial crisis being eased by the arrival of new Tanzanian chairman Firoz Kassam.

Swansea City, Rotherham United, Northampton Town and Peterborough United occupied the four promotion places in Division Three.

Chester City were relegated on the last day of the season, ending their 69-year league career and would be relegated from the League again nine years later while Shrewsbury Town and Carlisle United saved themselves from Conference football.

== First Division ==
First Division
- Season: 1999–2000
- Champions: Charlton Athletic
- Promoted: Charlton Athletic; Manchester City; Ipswich Town
- Relegated: Walsall; Port Vale; Swindon Town
- Matches: 552
- Goals: 1,391 (2.52 per match)
- Top goalscorer: Andy Hunt (24 goals)

Pos	Team	Pld	W	D	L	GF	GA	GD	Pts	Qualification or relegation
1	Charlton Athletic (C, P)	46	27	10	9	79	45	+34	91	Promotion to the Premier League
2	Manchester City (P)	46	26	11	9	78	40	+38	89	Promotion to the Premier League
3	Ipswich Town (O, P)	46	25	12	9	71	42	+29	87	Qualification for the First Division play-offs
4	Barnsley	46	24	10	12	88	67	+21	82	Qualification for the First Division play-offs
5	Birmingham City	46	22	11	13	65	44	+21	77	Qualification for the First Division play-offs
6	Bolton Wanderers	46	21	13	12	69	50	+19	76	Qualification for the First Division play-offs
7	Wolverhampton Wanderers	46	21	11	14	64	48	+16	74	
8	Huddersfield Town	46	21	11	14	62	49	+13	74	
9	Fulham	46	17	16	13	49	41	+8	67	
10	Queens Park Rangers	46	16	18	12	62	53	+9	66	
11	Blackburn Rovers	46	15	17	14	55	51	+4	62	
12	Norwich City	46	14	15	17	45	50	−5	57	
13	Tranmere Rovers	46	15	12	19	57	68	−11	57	
14	Nottingham Forest	46	14	14	18	53	55	−2	56	
15	Crystal Palace	46	13	15	18	57	67	−10	54	
16	Sheffield United	46	13	15	18	59	71	−12	54	
17	Stockport County	46	13	15	18	55	67	−12	54	
18	Portsmouth	46	13	12	21	55	66	−11	51	
19	Crewe Alexandra	46	14	9	23	46	67	−21	51	
20	Grimsby Town	46	13	12	21	41	67	−26	51	
21	West Bromwich Albion	46	10	19	17	43	60	−17	49	
22	Walsall (R)	46	11	13	22	52	77	−25	46	Relegation to the Second Division
23	Port Vale (R)	46	7	15	24	48	69	−21	36	Relegation to the Second Division
24	Swindon Town (R)	46	8	12	26	38	77	−39	36	Relegation to the Second Division

Rules for classification: 1) Points; 2) Goal difference; 3) Goals scored
(C) Champions; (O) Play-off winners; (P) Promoted; (R) Relegated

=== Location of clubs ===
Locations of the Football League First Division 1999–2000 teams
Locations of the Football League First Division London teams 1999–2000

=== Play-offs ===
Semifinals; 1st leg – May 13th/14th; 2nd leg – May 17th/18th, 2000
3rd	Ipswich Town (a.e.t.)	2	5	7
6th	Bolton Wanderers	2	3	5
4th	Barnsley	4	1	5
5th	Birmingham City	0	2	2

Final at Wembley; May 29th, 2000
3rd	Ipswich Town	4
4th	Barnsley	2

=== Results ===
Home \ Away	BAR	BIR	BLB	BOL	CHA	CRE	CRY	FUL	GRI	HUD	IPS	MCI	NWC	NOT	PTV	POR	QPR	SHU	STP	SWI	TRA	WAL	WBA	WOL
Barnsley		2–1	5–1	1–1	1–1	0–2	2–3	1–0	3–0	4–2	0–2	2–1	2–1	1–0	3–1	6–0	1–1	2–0	2–1	1–0	3–0	3–2	2–2	1–2
Birmingham City	3–1		1–0	2–1	1–0	5–1	2–0	2–2	0–0	1–0	1–1	0–1	2–0	0–1	4–2	1–0	2–0	0–2	2–1	1–1	3–1	2–0	1–1	1–0
Blackburn Rovers	1–2	1–0		3–1	1–1	0–1	1–1	2–0	1–1	2–0	2–2	1–4	1–1	2–1	0–0	1–1	0–2	5–0	2–0	0–0	2–0	2–0	2–1	1–1
Bolton Wanderers	2–2	3–3	3–1		0–2	2–2	2–0	3–1	2–0	1–0	1–1	0–1	1–0	3–2	2–1	3–0	2–1	2–0	0–1	2–0	2–3	4–3	1–1	2–1
Charlton Athletic	3–1	1–0	1–2	2–1		1–0	2–1	1–0	4–0	0–1	1–3	0–1	1–0	3–0	2–2	1–1	2–1	1–0	4–0	0–1	3–2	2–1	0–0	2–0
Crewe Alexandra	0–1	2–3	0–0	1–3	0–2		2–0	1–1	1–1	1–1	1–2	1–1	1–0	0–3	2–1	1–3	2–1	1–0	3–2	2–1	0–2	2–3	2–0	1–0
Crystal Palace	0–2	0–2	2–1	0–0	0–1	1–1		0–0	3–0	2–2	2–2	1–1	1–0	2–0	1–1	4–0	3–0	1–1	3–3	1–2	2–2	3–2	0–2	1–1
Fulham	1–3	0–0	2–2	1–1	2–1	3–0	1–0		0–1	3–0	0–0	0–0	1–1	1–1	3–1	1–0	1–0	4–0	4–1	1–0	1–0	2–0	1–0	0–1
Grimsby Town	0–3	1–1	0–0	0–1	2–5	1–1	1–0	1–1		0–0	2–1	1–1	2–1	4–3	2–0	1–0	2–1	2–2	0–1	1–0	1–2	1–0	1–1	1–0
Huddersfield Town	2–1	0–0	3–2	0–3	1–2	3–0	7–1	1–1	3–1		3–1	1–1	1–0	2–1	2–2	0–1	1–0	4–1	0–2	4–0	1–0	1–1	1–0	2–0
Ipswich Town	6–1	0–1	0–0	1–0	4–2	2–1	1–0	1–0	2–0	2–1		2–1	0–2	3–1	3–0	0–1	1–4	1–1	1–0	3–0	0–0	2–0	3–1	1–0
Manchester City	3–1	1–0	2–0	2–0	1–1	4–0	2–1	4–0	2–1	0–1	1–0		3–1	1–0	2–1	4–2	1–3	6–0	1–2	3–0	2–0	1–1	2–1	0–1
Norwich City	2–2	0–1	0–2	2–1	0–3	2–1	0–1	1–2	3–0	1–1	0–0	1–0		1–0	0–0	2–1	2–1	2–1	2–0	0–2	1–1	1–1	2–1	1–0
Nottingham Forest	3–0	1–0	0–1	1–1	1–1	1–0	2–0	0–0	2–1	1–3	0–1	1–3	1–1		2–0	2–0	1–1	0–0	1–1	3–1	1–1	4–1	0–0	1–1
Port Vale	2–2	3–1	0–0	0–1	2–2	1–0	2–2	0–2	3–1	1–2	1–2	1–2	0–1	0–2		2–0	1–1	2–3	1–1	2–0	1–0	1–2	1–2	0–1
Portsmouth	3–0	2–2	1–2	0–0	0–2	0–2	3–1	0–1	1–2	0–0	1–1	2–2	2–1	2–1	0–0		1–3	2–0	2–0	4–1	1–2	5–1	2–0	2–3
Queens Park Rangers	2–2	2–2	0–0	0–1	0–0	1–0	0–1	0–0	1–0	3–1	3–1	1–1	2–2	1–1	3–2	0–0		3–1	1–1	2–1	2–1	2–1	0–0	1–1
Sheffield United	3–3	1–2	2–1	1–2	1–2	1–1	3–1	2–0	0–0	0–1	2–2	1–0	0–0	2–1	1–3	1–0	1–1		1–0	2–2	3–1	1–1	6–0	3–0
Stockport County	1–3	2–0	0–1	0–0	1–3	2–1	1–2	2–1	2–1	1–1	0–1	2–2	2–2	2–3	1–0	1–1	3–3	1–1		3–0	2–1	1–1	0–1	3–2
Swindon Town	1–2	1–4	2–1	0–4	1–2	0–1	2–4	1–0	0–1	2–0	1–4	0–2	0–0	0–0	2–1	1–1	0–1	2–2	1–1		3–1	1–1	1–2	1–2
Tranmere Rovers	2–2	2–1	2–1	0–0	2–2	2–0	1–2	1–1	3–2	1–0	0–2	1–1	1–2	3–0	2–1	2–4	1–1	1–3	0–0	3–1		1–1	3–0	1–0
Walsall	1–4	1–0	1–1	2–0	2–4	1–4	2–2	1–3	1–0	2–0	0–1	0–1	2–2	0–2	0–0	1–0	2–3	2–1	1–2	0–0	1–2		2–1	1–1
West Bromwich Albion	0–2	0–3	2–2	4–4	2–0	1–0	0–0	0–0	2–1	0–1	1–1	0–2	1–1	1–1	0–0	3–2	0–1	2–2	2–0	1–1	2–0	0–1		1–1
Wolverhampton Wanderers	2–0	2–1	2–1	1–0	2–3	2–0	2–1	3–0	3–0	0–1	2–1	4–1	1–0	3–0	2–2	1–1	3–2	1–0	2–2	1–1	4–0	1–2	1–1	

Legend: Blue = home team win; Yellow = draw; Red = away team win.

=== Attendances ===
#	Club	Average
1	Manchester City	32,088
2	Birmingham City	21,895
3	Wolverhampton Wanderers	21,470
4	Charlton Athletic	19,558
5	Blackburn Rovers	19,253
6	Ipswich Town	18,524
7	Nottingham Forest	17,196
8	Crystal Palace	15,662
9	Norwich City	15,539
10	Barnsley	15,412
11	West Bromwich Albion	14,584
12	Bolton Wanderers	14,297
13	Huddersfield Town	14,029
14	Portsmouth	13,906
15	Sheffield United	13,718
16	Fulham	13,092
17	Queens Park Rangers	12,592
18	Stockport County	7,411
19	Tranmere Rovers	7,273
20	Swindon Town	6,977
21	Walsall	6,779
22	Crewe Alexandra	6,222
23	Grimsby Town	6,157
24	Port Vale	5,997

== Second Division ==
Football League, Second Division
- Season: 1999–2000
- Champions: Preston North End (2nd third tier title)
- Promoted: Preston North End, Burnley
- Promoted via play-offs: Gillingham
- Relegated: Blackpool, Cardiff City, Chesterfield, Scunthorpe United
- Matches: 552
- Goals: 1,404 (2.54 per match)
- Top goalscorer: Andy Payton (Burnley), 27

Pos	Team	Pld	W	D	L	GF	GA	GD	Pts	Promotion or relegation
1	Preston North End (C, P)	46	28	11	7	74	37	+37	95	Promotion to the First Division
2	Burnley (P)	46	25	13	8	69	47	+22	88	Promotion to the First Division
3	Gillingham (O, P)	46	25	10	11	79	48	+31	85	Qualification for the Second Division play-offs
4	Wigan Athletic	46	22	17	7	72	38	+34	83	Qualification for the Second Division play-offs
5	Millwall	46	23	13	10	76	50	+26	82	Qualification for the Second Division play-offs
6	Stoke City	46	23	13	10	68	42	+26	82	Qualification for the Second Division play-offs
7	Bristol Rovers	46	23	11	12	69	45	+24	80	
8	Notts County	46	18	11	17	61	55	+6	65	
9	Bristol City	46	15	19	12	59	57	+2	64	
10	Reading	46	16	14	16	57	63	−6	62	
11	Wrexham	46	17	11	18	52	61	−9	62	
12	Wycombe Wanderers	46	16	13	17	56	53	+3	61	
13	Luton Town	46	17	10	19	61	65	−4	61	
14	Oldham Athletic	46	16	12	18	50	55	−5	60	
15	Bury	46	13	18	15	61	64	−3	57	
16	Bournemouth	46	16	9	21	59	62	−3	57	
17	Brentford	46	13	13	20	47	61	−14	52	
18	Colchester United	46	14	10	22	59	82	−23	52	
19	Cambridge United	46	12	12	22	64	65	−1	48	
20	Oxford United	46	12	9	25	43	73	−30	45	
21	Cardiff City (R)	46	9	17	20	45	67	−22	44	Relegation to the Third Division
22	Blackpool (R)	46	8	17	21	49	77	−28	41	Relegation to the Third Division
23	Scunthorpe United (R)	46	9	12	25	40	74	−34	39	Relegation to the Third Division
24	Chesterfield (R)	46	7	15	24	34	63	−29	36	Relegation to the Third Division

Rules for classification: 1) Points; 2) Goal difference; 3) Goals scored
(C) Champions; (O) Play-off winners; (P) Promoted; (R) Relegated

=== Location of clubs ===
Locations of the Football League Second Division 1999–2000 teams
Locations of the Football League Second Division London teams 1999–2000

=== Play-offs ===
Semifinals; 1st leg – May 13th; 2nd leg – May 17th, 2000
3rd	Gillingham	2	3	5
6th	Stoke City	3	0	3
4th	Wigan Athletic	0	1	1
5th	Millwall	0	0	0

Final at Wembley Stadium; May 28th, 2000
3rd	Gillingham (a.e.t.)	3
4th	Wigan Athletic	2

=== Results ===
Home \ Away	BLP	BOU	BRE	BRC	BRR	BUR	BRY	CAM	CAR	CHF	COL	GIL	LUT	MIL	NTC	OLD	OXF	PNE	REA	SCU	STO	WIG	WRE	WYC
Blackpool		0–0	0–1	1–2	2–1	1–1	0–5	2–1	2–2	2–2	1–1	1–1	3–3	1–2	2–1	1–2	1–1	0–0	0–2	0–2	1–2	2–2	2–1	1–2
Bournemouth	2–0		4–1	2–3	0–1	0–1	1–1	2–1	1–0	1–1	4–0	0–1	1–0	1–2	1–1	3–0	4–0	0–1	3–1	1–1	1–1	2–2	1–0	2–0
Brentford	2–0	0–2		2–1	0–3	2–3	2–1	1–1	2–1	1–1	0–0	1–2	2–0	1–3	0–2	2–0	2–0	2–2	1–1	4–3	0–1	0–2	0–2	0–0
Bristol City	5–2	3–1	1–0		0–0	0–0	1–1	1–1	0–0	3–0	1–1	0–1	0–0	0–0	2–2	1–1	2–2	0–2	3–1	2–1	2–2	0–0	4–0	0–0
Bristol Rovers	3–1	2–2	0–0	2–0		1–0	0–0	1–0	1–1	3–1	2–1	2–1	3–0	1–0	0–1	3–2	1–0	0–2	0–1	1–1	3–3	1–1	3–1	1–0
Burnley	1–0	2–1	2–2	2–0	1–0		2–2	2–0	2–1	2–1	3–0	0–3	0–2	4–3	2–1	3–0	3–2	0–3	3–0	1–2	1–0	0–0	5–0	1–0
Bury	3–2	2–2	2–2	0–0	0–0	4–2		0–2	3–2	1–1	5–2	2–1	1–0	2–2	1–3	2–2	1–2	1–3	1–1	3–0	0–0	2–2	0–2	2–0
Cambridge United	0–2	0–2	2–2	3–0	1–1	0–1	3–0		0–0	2–0	5–2	2–2	3–1	0–2	1–1	2–3	2–0	2–0	3–1	1–3	1–3	1–1	3–4	1–2
Cardiff City	1–1	1–2	1–1	0–0	1–0	1–2	0–2	0–4		2–1	3–2	1–2	1–3	1–1	2–1	1–1	1–1	0–4	1–0	1–1	1–2	0–0	1–1	2–2
Chesterfield	0–0	0–1	1–0	0–2	0–1	1–1	0–1	4–2	1–1		0–1	0–0	1–3	2–0	2–1	0–1	0–0	0–1	2–0	1–1	0–2	1–1	0–3	1–2
Colchester United	1–1	3–1	0–3	3–4	5–4	1–2	1–3	3–1	0–3	1–0		2–1	3–0	1–2	0–3	0–1	1–2	2–2	3–2	0–1	1–0	2–2	2–2	1–0
Gillingham	1–3	4–1	2–0	3–0	0–1	2–2	1–0	2–1	4–1	1–0	2–1		2–0	2–0	0–1	2–1	1–0	0–2	2–2	3–1	3–0	2–1	5–1	2–2
Luton Town	3–2	1–2	1–2	1–2	1–4	2–1	1–1	2–2	1–0	1–1	3–2	3–1		0–2	2–2	1–1	4–2	0–2	3–1	4–1	2–1	1–1	3–1	1–1
Millwall	1–1	3–1	3–2	4–1	3–0	1–1	3–0	2–1	2–0	1–1	1–0	2–2	1–0		1–0	1–0	1–0	0–2	5–0	1–2	1–0	3–3	0–0	1–1
Notts County	2–1	5–1	0–1	4–4	0–2	2–0	2–2	2–3	2–1	1–0	1–2	1–1	0–0	1–1		0–1	0–1	1–0	1–2	3–0	0–0	0–2	2–1	2–1
Oldham Athletic	1–1	1–0	3–0	1–1	1–4	0–1	2–0	1–0	1–2	1–2	1–2	1–3	2–1	2–1	1–2		2–0	0–1	1–2	1–1	0–1	2–1	0–0	2–2
Oxford United	0–1	1–0	1–1	3–0	0–5	1–2	1–1	1–0	2–3	2–1	1–1	1–2	0–1	1–3	2–3	1–0		0–4	1–3	2–0	1–1	1–2	1–4	0–0
Preston North End	3–0	3–0	2–1	1–0	2–1	0–0	1–1	2–1	0–0	0–2	2–3	0–2	1–0	3–2	2–0	2–0	3–1		2–2	1–0	2–1	1–4	1–0	3–2
Reading	1–1	2–0	1–0	2–1	2–0	0–0	2–0	0–0	0–1	1–0	2–0	2–2	1–2	2–0	0–0	1–1	1–2	2–2		1–1	1–0	0–2	2–2	2–1
Scunthorpe United	1–0	3–1	0–0	1–2	0–2	1–2	0–2	0–3	0–0	0–0	0–0	1–4	1–2	1–4	1–0	1–2	1–0	1–1	2–2		0–2	1–2	0–2	0–1
Stoke City	3–0	1–0	1–0	1–1	1–2	2–2	3–0	1–0	2–1	5–1	1–1	1–1	2–1	3–1	0–1	0–0	1–2	2–1	2–1	1–0		1–1	2–0	1–1
Wigan Athletic	5–1	3–1	1–0	2–1	3–1	1–1	1–0	1–1	2–0	3–0	0–1	2–0	1–0	1–1	2–0	0–1	2–0	0–1	1–0	3–0	1–2		0–1	2–1
Wrexham	1–1	1–0	0–1	0–1	2–1	0–1	1–0	1–1	2–1	1–1	1–0	1–0	1–0	1–1	2–3	0–3	1–0	0–0	0–1	3–1	2–3	1–1		1–3
Wycombe Wanderers	0–2	2–1	2–0	1–2	1–1	1–1	3–0	1–0	3–1	3–0	3–0	1–0	0–1	1–2	2–0	0–0	0–1	1–1	5–3	2–1	0–4	0–2	0–1	

Legend: Blue = home team win; Yellow = draw; Red = away team win.

== Third Division ==
Football League, Third Division
- Season: 1999–2000
- Champions: Swansea City (1st fourth tier title)
- Direct promotion: Swansea City, Northampton, Rotherham United
- Promoted through play-offs: Peterborough United
- Relegated to Conference: Chester
- Matches: 552
- Goals: 1,303 (2.36 per match)
- Top goalscorer: Marco Gabbiadini (Darlington), 24

Pos	Team	Pld	W	D	L	GF	GA	GD	Pts	Promotion or relegation
1	Swansea City (C, P)	46	24	13	9	51	30	+21	85	Promotion to the Second Division
2	Rotherham United (P)	46	24	12	10	72	36	+36	84	Promotion to the Second Division
3	Northampton Town (P)	46	25	7	14	63	45	+18	82	Promotion to the Second Division
4	Darlington	46	21	16	9	66	36	+30	79	Qualification for the Third Division play-offs
5	Peterborough United (O, P)	46	22	12	12	63	54	+9	78	Qualification for the Third Division play-offs
6	Barnet	46	21	12	13	59	53	+6	75	Qualification for the Third Division play-offs
7	Hartlepool United	46	21	9	16	60	49	+11	72	Qualification for the Third Division play-offs
8	Cheltenham Town	46	20	10	16	50	42	+8	70	
9	Torquay United	46	19	12	15	62	52	+10	69	
10	Rochdale	46	18	14	14	57	54	+3	68	
11	Brighton & Hove Albion	46	17	16	13	64	46	+18	67	
12	Plymouth Argyle	46	16	18	12	55	51	+4	66	
13	Macclesfield Town	46	18	11	17	66	61	+5	65	
14	Hull City	46	15	14	17	43	43	0	59	
15	Lincoln City	46	15	14	17	67	69	−2	59	
16	Southend United	46	15	11	20	53	61	−8	56	
17	Mansfield Town	46	16	8	22	50	65	−15	56	
18	Halifax Town	46	15	9	22	44	58	−14	54	
19	Leyton Orient	46	13	13	20	47	52	−5	52	
20	York City	46	12	16	18	39	53	−14	52	
21	Exeter City	46	11	11	24	46	72	−26	44	
22	Shrewsbury Town	46	9	13	24	40	67	−27	40	
23	Carlisle United	46	9	12	25	42	75	−33	39	
24	Chester City (R)	46	10	9	27	44	79	−35	39	Relegation to Football Conference

Rules for classification: 1) Points; 2) Goal difference; 3) Goals scored
(C) Champions; (O) Play-off winners; (P) Promoted; (R) Relegated

=== Locations of clubs ===
Locations of the Football League Third Division teams 1999–2000
Locations of the Football League Third Division London teams 1999–2000

=== Play-offs ===
Semifinals; 1st leg – May 13th; 2nd leg – May 17th, 2000
4th	Darlington	2	1	3
7th	Hartlepool United	0	0	0
5th	Peterborough United	2	3	5
6th	Barnet	1	0	1

Final at Wembley Stadium; May 26th, 2000
4th	Darlington	0
5th	Peterborough United	1

== See also ==
- 1999-2000 in English football
- 1999 in association football
- 2000 in association football
