= List of Swansea City A.F.C. records and statistics =

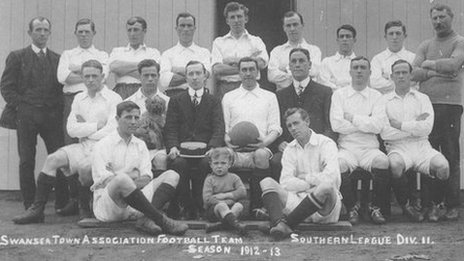
The Swansea Town team during its first season, 1912–13

Swansea City Association Football Club (Welsh: Clwb Pêl-droed Dinas Abertawe) is a Welsh professional football club based in the city of Swansea, south Wales, that play in the EFL Championship. They play their home matches at the Swansea.com Stadium.

The club was founded in 1912 as Swansea Town and joined the Football League in 1921. The club changed their name in 1969, when it adopted the name Swansea City to reflect Swansea's new status as a city.

The list encompasses the major honours won by Swansea City, records set by the club, their managers and their players, and details of their performance in European competition. The player records section itemises the club's leading goalscorers and those who have made most appearances in first-team competitions. It also records notable achievements by Swansea players on the international stage, and the highest transfer fees paid and received by the club. Attendance records at the Vetch Field and Swansea.com Stadium are also included.

== Honours ==
Swansea City's honours include the following:

The Football League

- English second tier (currently Football League Championship)
  - Promoted (1): 1980–81
  - Play-off winners (1): 2010–11
- English third tier (currently Football League One)
  - Winners (3): 1924–25, 1948–49, 2007–08
  - Promoted (1): 1978–79
- English fourth tier (currently Football League Two)
  - Winners (1): 1999–2000
  - Promoted (3): 1969–70, 1977–78, 2004–05
  - Play-off winners (1): 1987–88

Domestic Cup Competition

- Football League Cup
  - Winners (1): 2012–13
- FA Cup
  - Semi-finalists (2): 1925–26, 1963–64
- Football League Trophy
  - Winners (2): 1993–94, 2005–06
- Welsh Cup
  - Winners (10): 1912–13, 1931–32, 1949–50, 1960–61, 1965–66, 1980–81, 1981–82, 1982–83, 1988–89, 1990–91
  - Runners-up (8): 1914–15, 1925–26, 1937–38, 1939–40, 1948–49, 1955–56, 1956–57, 1968–69
- FAW Premier Cup
  - Winners (2): 2004–05, 2005–06
  - Runners-up (2): 2000–01, 2001–02

European Competition

- UEFA Cup Winners' Cup
  - Qualification: 1961–62, 1966–67, 1981–82, 1982–83, 1983–84, 1989–90, 1991–92
- UEFA Europa League
  - Qualification: 2013-14

Domestic Youth Cup Competition

- FAW Welsh Youth Cup
  - Winners (13): 1999, 2003, 2008, 2010, 2011, 2012, 2013, 2014, 2015, 2016, 2017, 2018, 2019
  - Runners-up (6): 1990, 1991, 1994, 1996, 2004, 2009

== Player records ==
=== Appearances ===
- Youngest first-team player: Nigel Dalling, 15 years 289 days (against Southport, Fourth Division, 6 December 1974).
- Oldest first-team player: Tommy Hutchison, 43 years, 172 days (against Southend United, Third Division, 12 March 1991).

==== Most appearances ====
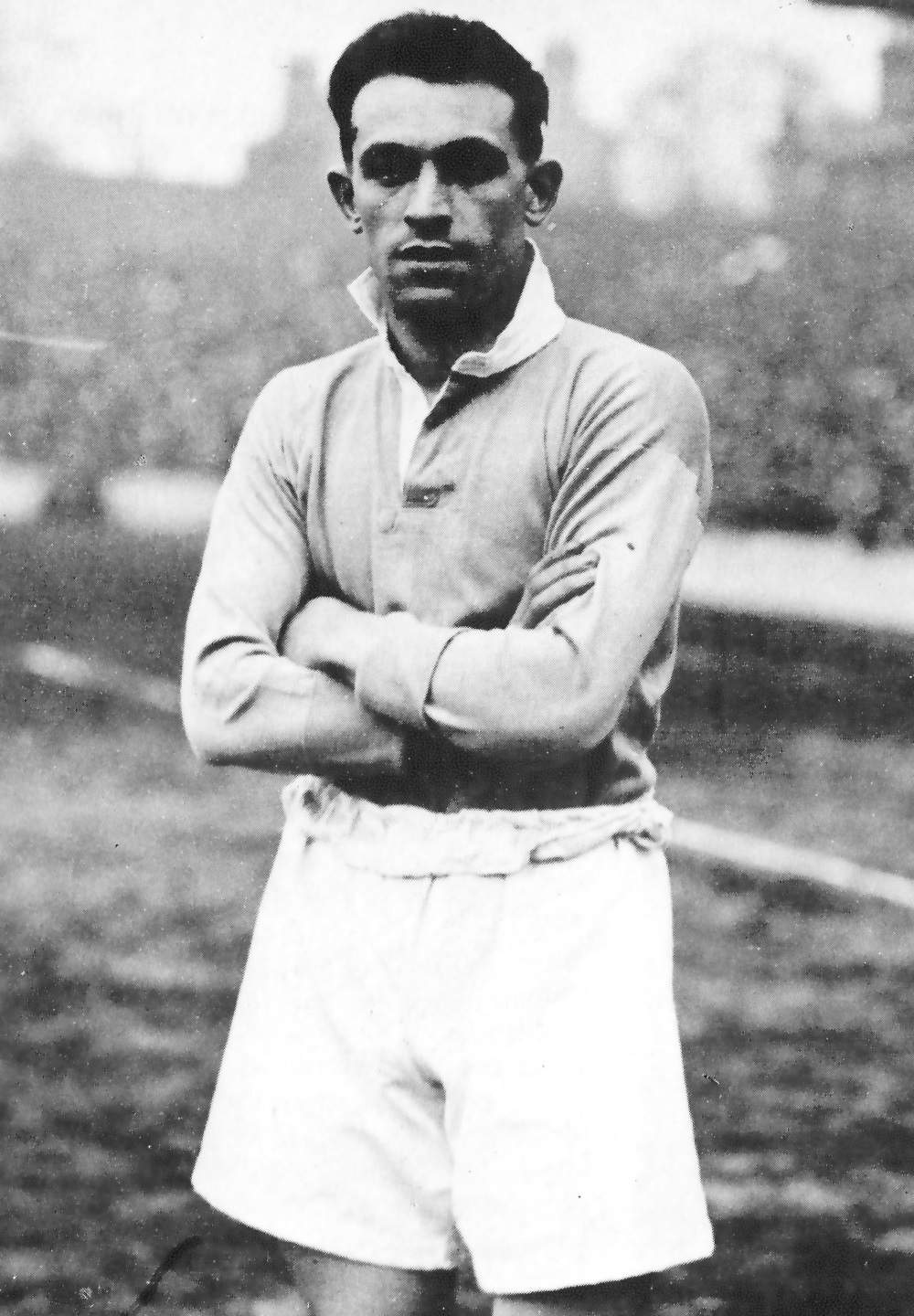
Wilfred Milne made 586 appearances for Swansea Town.

League matches only. To matches played 14 November 2017.

#	Name	Career	Appearances
1	(England) Wilfred Milne	1920–1937	586
2	(Wales) Roger Freestone	1989; 1991–2004	563
3	(Wales) Herbie Williams	1958–1975	513
4	(Wales) Robbie James	1973–1983; 1988–1990	482
5	(England) Leon Britton	2002–2010; 2011–2018	460
6	(Wales) Ivor Allchurch	1947–1958; 1965–1968	445
7	(Wales) Harry Griffiths	1949–1964	422
8	(Wales) Wyndham Evans	1971–1983; 1984–1985	389
9	(Wales) John King	1950–1964	368
10	(Wales) Alan Curtis	1972–1979; 1980–1983; 1989–1990	364

=== Goalscorers ===
- Most goals in a season in all competitions: 40, by Cyril Pearce in 1931–32
- Most league goals in a top-flight season: 34, by Bob Latchford in 1982–83
- Most League goals in a season: 35, by Cyril Pearce in 1931–32
- Most League goals in a 38-game season: 18, by Michu in 2012–13
- Most goals in a competitive match: 5, by Jack Fowler against Charlton Athletic, Third Division (South), 27 December 1924.
- Most hat-tricks: 9, by Jack Fowler between 1924 and 1927.

==== Overall scorers ====
League matches only. To matches played 2 February 2013.

#	Name	Career	Goals
1	(Wales) Ivor Allchurch	1947–1958; 1965–1968	166
2	(Wales) Robbie James	1973–1983; 1988–1990	115
3	(Wales) Herbie Williams	1958–1975	104
4	(Wales) Jack Fowler	1924–1930	102
5	(Wales) Alan Curtis	1972–1979; 1980–1983; 1989–1990	96
6	(England) Len Thompson	1922–1927	89
7	(England) Lee Trundle	2003–2007; 2009–2010	83
8	(Wales) Keith Todd	1959–1968	78
9	(Wales) Harry Griffiths	1949–1964	72
10	(Wales) Mel Charles	1952–1959	69

=== Transfers ===
For consistency, fees in the record transfer tables below are all sourced from BBC Sport's contemporary reports of each transfer. Where the report mentions an initial fee potentially rising to a higher figure depending on contractual clauses being satisfied in the future, only the initial fee is listed in the tables.

==== Record transfer fees paid ====
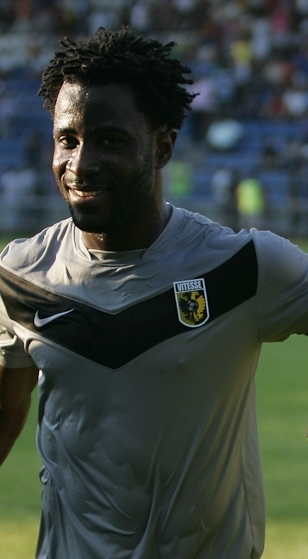
Wilfried Bony during a UEFA Europa League match between Anzhi Makhachkala and Vitesse Arnhem at Anzhi-Arena on 2 August 2012.

#	Fee	Paid to	For		Date	Notes
1	£18M	(England) West Ham United	GHA	André Ayew	31 January 2018	
2	£15.5M	(Spain) Atlético Madrid	ESP	Borja Bastón	11 August 2016	
=3	£12M	(Netherlands) Vitesse	CIV	Wilfried Bony	11 July 2013	
=3	£12M	(England) Manchester City	CIV	Wilfried Bony	31 August 2017	
5	£11M	(Spain) Las Palmas	ESP	Roque Mesa	6 July 2017	

==== Record transfer fees received ====
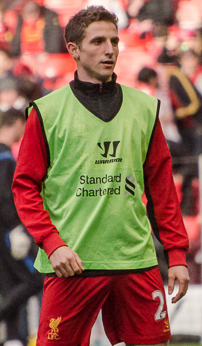
Joe Allen warming-up before match between Liverpool and Wigan Athletic at Anfield on 17 November 2012.

#	Fee	Received from	For		Date	Notes
1	£45M	(England) Everton	ISL	Gylfi Sigurðsson	16 August 2017	
2	£25M	(England) Manchester City	CIV	Wilfried Bony	14 January 2015	
3	£20.5M	(England) West Ham United	GHA	André Ayew	8 August 2016	
4	£17.5M	(England) Sheffield United	SCO	Oli McBurnie	2 August 2019	
5	£15M	(England) Liverpool	WAL	Joe Allen	10 August 2012	

=== Club Transfer Record Progression ===
Year	Player	Selling Club	Transfer Fee
1982	(England) Colin Irwin	(England) Liverpool	£340,000
2008	(Wales) Ashley Williams	(England) Stockport County	£400,000
2009	(England) Nathan Dyer	(England) Southampton	£400,000
2009	(Scotland) Craig Beattie	(England) West Bromwich Albion	£500,000
2010	(Wales) David Cotterill	(England) Sheffield United	£600,000
2011	(England) Danny Graham	(England) Watford	£3,500,000
2012	(South Korea) Ki Sung-Yueng	(Scotland) Celtic	£6,000,000
2013	(Ivory Coast) Wilfried Bony	(Netherlands) SBV Vitesse	£12,000,000
2016	(Spain) Borja Bastón	(Spain) Atlético Madrid	£15,500,000
2017	(England) Sam Clucas	(England) Hull City	£16,500,000
2018	(Ghana) André Ayew	(England) West Ham United	£18,000,000

=== International caps ===
- First capped player: Ivor Jones for Wales against Ireland on 14 February 1920.
- Most capped player: Ashley Williams with 64 caps for Wales while at Swansea.

==== World Cup players ====
The following players have been selected by their country in the World Cup Finals, while playing for Swansea.

- (Wales) Ivor Allchurch (1958)
- (Wales) Len Allchurch (1958)
- (Wales) Mel Charles (1958)
- (Wales) Cliff Jones (1958)
- (Wales) Terry Medwin (1958)
- (Netherlands) Michel Vorm (2014)
- (Netherlands) Jonathan de Guzmán (2014)
- (Ivory Coast) Wilfried Bony (2014)
- (South Korea) Ki Sung-yueng (2014), (2018)
- (Poland) Łukasz Fabiański (2018)
- (Sweden) Kristoffer Nordfeldt (2018)
- (Sweden) Martin Olsson (2018)
- (Cameroon) Olivier Ntcham (2022)
- (Wales) Joe Allen (2022)
- (Wales) Ben Cabango (2022)
- (New Zealand) Marko Stamenić (2026)
- (South Korea) Eom Ji-sung (2026)
- (Australia) Cameron Burgess (2026)

==== European Championship players ====
The following players have been selected by their country in the European Championship Finals, while playing for Swansea.

- (Netherlands) Michel Vorm (2012)
- (Iceland) Gylfi Sigurðsson (2016)
- (Poland) Łukasz Fabiański (2016)
- (Wales) Neil Taylor (2016)
- (Wales) Ashley Williams (2016)
- (Wales) Connor Roberts (2020)
- (Wales) Ben Cabango (2020)

==== African Cup of Nations players ====
The following players have been selected by their country in the Africa Cup of Nations Finals, while playing for Swansea.

- (Nigeria) Reuben Agboola (1992)
- (Ivory Coast) Wilfried Bony (2015), (2019)
- (Ghana) Andre Ayew (2019)
- (Ghana) Jordan Ayew (2019)
- (Angola) Manuel Benson (2025)

==== Asian Cup players ====
The following players have been selected by their country in the Asian Cup Finals, while playing for Swansea.

- (South Korea) Ki Sung-yueng (2015)

==== Copa América players ====
The following players have been selected by their country in the Copa América Finals, while playing for Swansea.

- (Ecuador) Jefferson Montero (2015), (2016)

==== CONCACAF Gold Cup players ====
The following players have been selected by their country in the CONCACAF Gold Cup Finals, while playing for Swansea.

- (Jamaica) Joel Latibeaudiere (2023)

=== Award winners ===
==== PFA Team of the Year ====
The following have been included in the PFA Team of the Year whilst playing for Swansea City :

- 1977 (Wales) Alan Curtis (Fourth Division)
- 1978 (Wales) Robbie James, (Wales) Alan Curtis (Fourth Division)
- 1979 (England) Ian Callaghan, (Wales) Alan Curtis (Third Division)
- 1987 (Republic of Ireland) Terry Phelan, (Scotland) Tommy Hutchison, (Wales) Colin Pascoe (Fourth Division)
- 1988 (Wales) Alan Davies (Fourth Division)
- 1989 (Wales) Chris Coleman (Third Division)
- 1991 (Wales) Chris Coleman (Third Division)
- 1995 (England) John Cornforth (Second Division)
- 1997 (Denmark) Jan Mølby (Third Division)
- 2000 (England) Matthew Bound, (England) Nick Cusack (Third Division)
- 2004 (England) Lee Trundle (Third Division)
- 2005 (England) Lee Trundle, (England) Sam Ricketts (League Two)
- 2006 (England) Andy Robinson, (England) Lee Trundle (League One)
- 2008 (Trinidad and Tobago) Jason Scotland, (England) Andy Robinson, (Netherlands) Ferrie Bodde, (England) Garry Monk, (Spain) Àngel Rangel (League One)
- 2009 (Trinidad and Tobago) Jason Scotland, (Spain) Jordi Gómez (Championship)
- 2010 (Wales) Ashley Williams (Championship)
- 2011 (Wales) Ashley Williams, (England) Scott Sinclair (Championship)
- 2026 (Slovenia) Žan Vipotnik (Championship)

PFA Fans' Player of the Year

- 2003 (England) Leon Britton (Third Division)

Golden Boot

- 1925 (Wales) Jack Fowler (Third Division South)
- 1932 (England) Cyril Pearce (Second Division)
- 1978 (Wales) Alan Curtis (Fourth Division)
- 2008 (Trinidad and Tobago) Jason Scotland (League One)
- 2026 (Slovenia) Žan Vipotnik (Championship)

==== Football League 100 Legends ====
The Football League 100 Legends is a list of "100 legendary football players" produced by The Football League in 1998, to celebrate the 100th season of League football. Four former Swansea players made the list.

- (Wales) Trevor Ford
- (Wales) Ivor Allchurch
- (Wales) Cliff Jones
- (England) Tommy Smith

==== Welsh Sports Hall of Fame ====
The following have played for Swansea and have been inducted into the Welsh Sports Hall of Fame :

- (Wales) Ivor Allchurch
- (Wales) Trevor Ford
- (Wales) Cliff Jones
- (Wales) Ron Burgess
- (Wales) John Toshack
- (Wales) Terry Yorath
- (Italy) Giorgio Chinaglia

Premier League Player of the Month Award

- (Iceland) Gylfi Sigurðsson (March 2012)
- (Ghana) André Ayew (August 2015)

EFL Championship Player of the Month Award

- (Trinidad and Tobago) Jason Scotland (February 2009)

EFL League One Player of the Month Award

- (England) Lee Trundle (September 2005)
- (England) Lee Trundle (November 2005)
- (Trinidad and Tobago) Jason Scotland (December 2007)
- (Trinidad and Tobago) Jason Scotland (March 2008)

EFL League Two Player of the Month Award

- (England) Lee Trundle (January 2005)

Welsh Footballer of the Year

- (Wales) Ashley Williams - 2009
- (Wales) Joe Allen - 2012

Icelandic Footballer of the Year

- (Iceland) Gylfi Sigurðsson - 2012
- (Iceland) Gylfi Sigurðsson - 2014
- (Iceland) Gylfi Sigurðsson - 2015
- (Iceland) Gylfi Sigurðsson - 2016
- (Iceland) Gylfi Sigurðsson - 2017

South Korean Footballer of the Year

- (South Korea) Ki Sung-yueng - 2012
- (South Korea) Ki Sung-yueng - 2016

Ghana Player of the Year

- (Ghana) André Ayew - 2015

Polish Footballer of the Year

- (Poland) Łukasz Fabiański - 2018

==== Supporters' Player of the Year ====
Season	Award Winner
2025–26	(Slovenia) Žan Vipotnik
2024–25	(Portugal) Gonçalo Franco
2023–24	(England) Carl Rushworth
2022–23	(Republic of Ireland) Ryan Manning
2021–22	(Suriname) Joël Piroe
2020–21	(Wales) Connor Roberts
2019–20	(Ghana) André Ayew
2018–19	(England) Matt Grimes
2017–18	(Poland) Łukasz Fabiański
2016–17	(Iceland) Gylfi Sigurðsson
2015–16	(Iceland) Gylfi Sigurðsson
2014–15	(South Korea) Ki Sung-yueng
2013–14	(Ivory Coast) Wilfried Bony
2012–13	(Spain) Michu
2011–12	(Netherlands) Michel Vorm
2010–11	(England) Nathan Dyer
2009–10	(England) Alan Tate
2008–09	(Spain) Jordi Gómez
2007–08	(Trinidad and Tobago) Jason Scotland
2006–07	(England) Leon Britton
2005–06	(England) Alan Tate
2004–05	(Wales) Kristian O'Leary
2003–04	(England) Andy Robinson
2002–03	(England) Leon Britton

==== Players' Player of the Year ====
Season	Award Winner
2025–26	(Slovenia) Žan Vipotnik
2024–25	(Portugal) Gonçalo Franco
2023–24	(England) Carl Rushworth
2022–23	(Scotland) Jay Fulton
2021–22	(England) Kyle Naughton
2020–21	(Wales) Connor Roberts
2019–20	(Ghana) André Ayew
2018–19	(England) Matt Grimes
2017–18	(Ghana) Jordan Ayew
2016–17	(Iceland) Gylfi Sigurðsson
2015-16	(Iceland) Gylfi Sigurðsson
2014–15	(Poland) Łukasz Fabiański
2013–14	(Ivory Coast) Wilfried Bony
2012–13	(Spain) Michu
2011–12	(Netherlands) Michel Vorm
2010–11	(Netherlands) Dorus de Vries

==== Goal of the Season ====
Season	Award Winner	Goal
2025–26	(Wales) Liam Cullen	vs Stoke City
2024–25	(England) Josh Key	vs Plymouth Argyle
2023–24	(England) Josh Ginnelly	vs Northampton Town (EFL Cup)
2022–23	(Wales) Ben Cabango	vs Cardiff City
2021–22	(Republic of Ireland) Michael Obafemi	vs Cardiff City
2020–21	(Jamaica) Jamal Lowe	vs Cardiff City
2019–20	(England) Wayne Routledge	vs Reading F.C.
2018–19	(Kosovo) Bersant Celina	vs Manchester City (FA Cup)
2017–18	(Ghana) Jordan Ayew	vs Wolverhampton Wanderers (FA Cup)
2016–17	(Spain) Fernando Llorente	vs Liverpool F.C.
2015–16	(England) Jack Cork	vs Liverpool F.C.
2014–15	(England) Wayne Routledge	vs West Bromwich Albion
2013–14	(England) Jonjo Shelvey	vs Aston Villa
2012–13	(Netherlands) Jonathan de Guzmán	vs Stoke City
2011–12	(Iceland) Gylfi Sigurðsson	vs Wigan Athletic
2010–11	(England) Scott Sinclair	vs Nottingham Forest

==== Best Newcomer of the Year ====
Season	Award Winner
2025–26	(Northern Ireland) Ethan Galbraith
2024–25	(Chile) Lawrence Vigouroux
2023–24	(England) Josh Tymon
2022–23	(England) Nathan Wood
2021–22	(England) Flynn Downes
2020–21	Not Awarded
2019–20	(England) Rhian Brewster
2018–19	(Wales) Daniel James
2017–18	(Wales) Connor Roberts
2016–17	(Spain) Fernando Llorente
2015–16	(Ghana) André Ayew
2014–15	(Poland) Łukasz Fabiański
2013–14	(Ivory Coast) Wilfried Bony
2012–13	(Spain) Chico Flores
2011–12	Not Awarded
2010–11	(England) Scott Sinclair

==== Top Goalscorer ====
Season	Award Winner	Goals
2025–26	(Slovenia) Žan Vipotnik	25
2024–25	(Wales) Liam Cullen	12
2023–24	(Jamaica) Jamal Lowe (England) Jerry Yates	9
2022–23	(Suriname) Joël Piroe	19
2021–22	(Suriname) Joël Piroe	22
2020–21	(Ghana) André Ayew	15
2019–20	(Ghana) André Ayew	18
2018–19	(Scotland) Oli McBurnie	24
2017–18	(Ghana) Jordan Ayew	11
2016–17	(Spain) Fernando Llorente	15
2015–16	(Ghana) André Ayew	12
2014–15	(France) Bafétimbi Gomis	10
2013–14	(Ivory Coast) Wilfried Bony	25
2012–13	(Spain) Michu	22
2011–12	(England) Danny Graham	14
2010–11	(England) Scott Sinclair	27
2009–10	(England) Darren Pratley	7
2008–09	(Trinidad and Tobago) Jason Scotland	24
2007-08	(Trinidad and Tobago) Jason Scotland	29
2006–07	(England) Lee Trundle	20
2005–06	(England) Lee Trundle	21
2004–05	(England) Lee Trundle	23
2003–04	(England) Lee Trundle	22
2002–03	(Wales) James Thomas	13

==== Young Player of the Season ====
Season	Award Winner
2025–26	(Wales) Thomas Woodward
2024–25	(England) Arthur Parker
2023–24	(Czech Republic) Filip Lissah
2022–23	(Wales) Joe Thomas
2021–22	(Zimbabwe) Tivonge Rushesha
2020–21	(Iraq) Ali Al-Hamadi
2019–20	(Zimbabwe) Tivonge Rushesha
2018–19	(Germany) Steven Benda
2017–18	(Scotland) George Byers
2016–17	(Scotland) Oli McBurnie
2015–16	(Scotland) Stephen Kingsley
2014–15	Not Awarded
2013–14	(Wales) Lewis Thomas
2012–13	(Wales) Josh Sheehan
2011–12	(Wales) Scott Tancock
2010–11	(Wales) Ben Davies

==== Academy Player of the Season ====
Season	Award Winner
2025–26	(Wales) Carter Heywood
2024–25	(Wales) Jacob Cook
2023–24	(Ecuador) Aimar Govea
2022–23	(Wales) Joel Cotterill
2021–22	(Wales) Cameron Congreve
2020–21	(Wales) Cameron Congreve

== Managerial records ==
- First full-time manager: Walter Whittaker managed the club for two complete seasons, which included 75 matches, from 15 July 1912 to 25 April 1914.
- Longest serving manager by time: Haydn Green managed the club for 8 years, 4 months and 14 days, from 16 June 1939 to 29 October 1947.
- Longest serving manager by matches: Trevor Morris managed the club for 327 matches over a period of 6 years, 8 months and 14 days, from 27 August 1958 to 10 May 1965.

== Club records ==
=== Goals ===
- Most League goals scored in a season: 92 in 46 matches, Fourth Division, 1976-77
- Most Premier League goals scored in a season: 54 in 38 matches, Premier League, 2013-14
- Fewest League goals scored in a season: 36 in 42 matches, Second Division, 1983-84
- Most League goals conceded in a season: 99 in 42 matches, Second Division, 1957-58
- Fewest League goals conceded in a season: 29 in 42 matches, Third Division (South), 1924–25
- Most League clean sheets in a season: 23 by Dorus de Vries, Championship 2009–10

=== Points ===
- Most points in a season:

Two points for a win: 62 in 42 matches, Football League Third Division South, 1948-49
Three points for a win:

92 in 42 matches, League One, 2007-2008
56 in 38 matches, Premier League, 2014–2015

- Fewest points in a season:

Two points for a win: 29 in 42 matches, Second Division, 1946-47
Three points for a win: 29 in 42 matches, Second Division, 1983-84

=== Matches ===
==== Firsts ====
- First competitive match: Swansea Town 1–1 Cardiff City, Southern Football League Division Two, 7 September 1912
- First Football League match: Portsmouth 3–0 Swansea Town, Third Division 28 August 1920
- First FA Cup match: Port Talbot 0–4 Swansea Town, preliminary round, 27 September 1913
- First League Cup match: Swansea Town 1–2 Blackburn Rovers, second round, 18 October 1960
- First Welsh Cup match: Swansea Town 3–1 Milford, preliminary round, 31 October 1912
- First European match: Swansea Town 2–2 Motor Jena, European Cup Winners' Cup first round, first leg, 16 October 1961
- First match at Vetch Field: Swansea Town 1–1 Cardiff City, Southern Football League Division Two, 7 September 1912
- First match at Liberty Stadium: Swansea City 1–1 Fulham, friendly, 22 July 2005
- First competitive match at Liberty Stadium: Swansea City 1–0 Tranmere Rovers, League One, 6 August 2005
- First Premier League match: Manchester City 4–0 Swansea City, at the Etihad Stadium, 15 August 2011.
- First Premier League match played outside England: Swansea City 0–0 Wigan Athletic, at Liberty Stadium, 20 August 2011.
- First Premier League win: Swansea City 3–0 West Bromwich Albion, 17 September 2011.

==== Record wins ====
- Record win: 12–0 against Sliema Wanderers, European Cup Winners' Cup first round, first leg, 15 September 1982
- Record League win:

8–1 against Bristol Rovers, Third Division South, 15 April 1922
8–1 against Bradford City, Second Division, 22 February 1936
8–0 against Hartlepool United, Fourth Division, 1 April 1978

- Record FA Cup win:

8-1 against Notts County F.C., FA Cup fourth round replay, 6 February 2018

- Record European win: 12–0 against Sliema Wanderers, European Cup Winners' Cup first round, first leg, 15 September 1982
- Record home win: 12–0 against Sliema Wanderers, European Cup Winners' Cup first round, first leg, 15 September 1982
- Record away win: 6–4 against Bradford City, Third Division, 23 November 1990

==== Record defeats ====
- Record League defeat: Fulham 8–1 Swansea Town, Second Division, 22 January 1938
- Record FA Cup defeat: Liverpool 8–0 Swansea City, FA Cup third round replay, 9 January 1990
- Record European defeat: Monaco 8–0 Swansea City, European Cup Winners' Cup first round, second leg, 1 October 1991
- Record home defeat:

1–6 against Bradford Park Avenue, 14 September 1946
1–6 against Workington, 14 September 1965
1–6 against Reading, 23 September 1989
1–6 against Wigan Athletic, 6 April 1991
3–6 against Blackpool, 5 May 2007

- Record away defeat:

8–0 against Liverpool, FA Cup third round replay, 9 January 1990
8–0 against Monaco, European Cup Winners' Cup first round, second leg, 1 October 1991

=== Record consecutive results ===
- Longest unbeaten run (League):

19 matches from 4 February 1961 to 26 August 1961
19 matches from 19 October 1970 to 9 March 1971

- Longest winning streak (League): 9 matches, 27 November 1999 to 22 January 2000
- Longest losing streak (League): 9 matches, 26 January 1991 to 19 March 1991
- Longest drawing streak (League): 8 matches, 25 November 2008 to 28 December 2008
- Longest streak without a win (League): 15 matches, 25 March 1989 to 2 September 1989
- Longest scoring run (League): 27 matches, 28 August 1947 to 7 February 1948
- Longest non-scoring run (League): 6 matches, 6 February 1996 to 24 February 1996
- Longest streak without conceding a goal (League): 8 matches, 16 November 1999 to 28 December 1999

=== Attendances ===
A graph of Swansea City's league attendances at the Vetch Field from 1920 to 2005.

- Highest home attendance:32,786 against Arsenal at Vetch Field, FA Cup fourth round, 17 February 1968
- Lowest home attendance: 1,301 against Northampton Town at Vetch Field, Division Four, 18 September 1973
- Highest attendance at Vetch Field: 32,786 against Arsenal, FA Cup fourth round, 17 February 1968
- Lowest attendance at Vetch Field: 1,301 against Northampton Town, Division Four, 18 September 1973
- Highest attendance at Liberty Stadium: 20,973 against West Ham United, Championship, 17 October 2026
- Lowest attendance at Liberty Stadium: 9,675 against Gillingham, League One, 23 January 2007
- Highest Football League Attendance: 29,477 against Leeds United at the Vetch Field, Division Two, 1 October 1955
- Lowest Football League Attendance: 1,301 against Northampton Town at Vetch Field, Division Four, 18 September 1973
- Highest FA Cup Attendance: 32,786 against Arsenal at Vetch Field, fourth round, 17 February 1968
- Lowest FA Cup Attendance: 2,434 against Bognor Regis at Vetch Field, first round, 17 November 1984
- Highest seasonal average league attendance:
  - Pre-War: 16,118, Second Division, 1925–26
  - Post-War: 22,535, Third Division (South) 1948-49
- Lowest seasonal average league attendance: 2,052, Fourth Division, 1974–75.

== Swansea City in Europe ==
Swansea qualified for Europe seven times via wins in the Welsh Cup, but since 1995, they have not participated in the tournament, as UEFA barred clubs playing in the English football league system from representing Wales in Europe. The question was raised again in 2011–12 when Welsh clubs playing in England were invited back into the Welsh Cup (Swansea did not enter), but UEFA reiterated their position. In doing so, however, they confirmed that Swansea would be able to represent England in Europe, if they qualified. The following season, Swansea qualified for Europe through England for the first time, as League Cup winners.

=== Record by season ===
Swansea City's scores are given first in all scorelines.

Season	Competition	Round	Opponent	Home	Away	Aggregate	Refs
1961–62	UEFA Cup Winners' Cup	Preliminary round	(East Germany) Motor Jena	2–2	1–5	3–7	
1966–67	UEFA Cup Winners' Cup	First round	(Bulgaria) Slavia Sofia	1–1	0–4	1–5	
1981–82	UEFA Cup Winners' Cup	First round	(East Germany) Lokomotive Leipzig	0–1	1–2	1–3	
1982–83	UEFA Cup Winners' Cup	Preliminary round	(Portugal) Braga	3–0	0–1	3–1	
1982–83	UEFA Cup Winners' Cup	First round	(Malta) Sliema Wanderers	12–0	5–0	17–0	
1982–83	UEFA Cup Winners' Cup	Second round	(France) Paris Saint-Germain	0–1	0–2	0–3	
1983–84	UEFA Cup Winners' Cup	Preliminary round	(East Germany) 1. FC Magdeburg	1–1	0–1	1–2	
1989–90	UEFA Cup Winners' Cup	First round	(Greece) Panathinaikos	2–3	3–3	5–6	
1991–92	UEFA Cup Winners' Cup	First round	(France) Monaco	1–2	0–8	1–10	
2013–14	UEFA Europa League	Third qualifying round	(Sweden) Malmö FF	4–0	0–0	4–0	
2013–14	UEFA Europa League	Play-off round	(Romania) Petrolul Ploiești	5–1	1–2	6–3	
2013–14	UEFA Europa League	Group stage	(Russia) Kuban Krasnodar	1–1	1–1	2nd place	
2013–14	UEFA Europa League	Group stage	(Switzerland) St. Gallen	1–0	0–1	2nd place	
2013–14	UEFA Europa League	Group stage	(Spain) Valencia	0–1	3–0	2nd place	
2013–14	UEFA Europa League	Round of 32	(Italy) Napoli	0–0	1–3	1–3	

=== European attendance records ===
- Highest home attendance: 19,567 against Napoli, 2013–14 UEFA Europa League Round of 32 first leg, 20 February 2014.
- Lowest home attendance: 5,130 against Sliema Wanderers, 1982–83 European Cup Winners' Cup first round first leg, 15 September 1982.
- Highest away attendance: 53,500 against Panathinaikos, 1989–90 UEFA Cup Winners' Cup first round first leg, 13 September 1989.
- Lowest away attendance: 3,250 against Sliema Wanderers, 1982–83 European Cup Winners' Cup first round second leg, 29 September 1982.

== See also ==
List of Swansea City A.F.C. seasons
