= Swansea City A.F.C. league record by opponent =

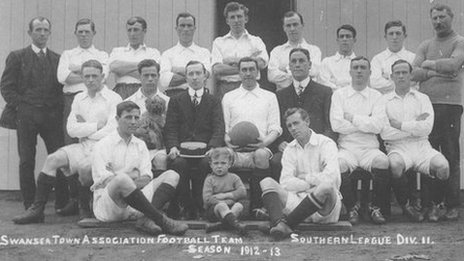
The Swansea Town team during its first season, 1912–13

Swansea City (Welsh: Clwb Pêl-droed Dinas Abertawe) is a Welsh football club based in the city of Swansea, which competes in the EFL Championship. The club was founded in 1912 as Swansea Town, and competed in the Southern Football League until they were elected to The Football League in 1920, as founders of the Third Division. The club changed its name in 1969, when it adopted the name Swansea City to reflect Swansea's new status as a city. In 2010, after winning a Championship Play-off final, Swansea became the first Welsh team to compete in the Premier League.

Swansea's first Southern Football League match was against Cardiff City and they met their 117th and most recent different league opponent, Milton Keynes Dons, for the first time in the 2005–06 Football League season. The team that Swansea have played most in league competition is Plymouth Argyle, who they first met in the 1919–20 Southern Football League season; the 33 wins from 82 meetings is more than they have achieved against any other club. Bristol Rovers and Brighton & Hove Albion have each drawn 23 league encounters with Swansea, more than any other club. The club has been defeated the most by Southampton who have defeated the Swans 32 times.

== Key ==
- The records include the results of matches played in the Southern Football League (from 1912 to 1920), The Football League (from 1920 to 2010) and the Premier League (from 2010 to the present day). Wartime matches are regarded as unofficial and are excluded, as are matches from the abandoned 1939–40 season.
- For the sake of simplicity, present-day names are used throughout.
- The season given as the "first" denotes the season in which Swansea City first played a league match against that team.
- The season given as the "last" denotes the season in which Swansea City last played a league match against that team.
- † Teams with this background and symbol in the "Club" column are current divisional rivals of Swansea City.
- ‡ Clubs with this background and symbol in the "Club" column are defunct.
- P = matches played; W = matches won; D = matches drawn; L = matches lost; Win% = percentage of total matches won.

== All-time league record ==
Statistics correct as of matches played up to 13 January 2016.^{[a]}

Swansea City A.F.C. league record by opponent
| Club | P | W | D | L | P | W | D | L | P | W | D | L | Win% | First | Last | Notes |
| Club | Home | | | | Away | | | | Total | | | | Win% | First | Last | Notes |
|---|---|---|---|---|---|---|---|---|---|---|---|---|---|---|---|---|
| Aberdare Athletic ‡ | 6 | 4 | 1 | 1 | 6 | 2 | 1 | 3 | 12 | 6 | 2 | 4 | 50.00 | 1912–13 | 1924–25 | |
| Abertillery Town ‡ | 1 | 1 | 0 | 0 | 1 | 1 | 0 | 0 | 2 | 2 | 0 | 0 | 100.00 | 1913–14 | 1913–14 | |
| Aldershot ‡ | 9 | 7 | 2 | 0 | 9 | 3 | 4 | 2 | 18 | 10 | 6 | 2 | 55.56 | 1947–48 | 1988–89 | |
| Arsenal † | 7 | 3 | 0 | 4 | 6 | 3 | 1 | 2 | 13 | 6 | 1 | 6 | 46.15 | 1981–82 | 2015–16 | |
| Aston Villa † | 11 | 5 | 2 | 4 | 12 | 3 | 1 | 8 | 23 | 8 | 3 | 12 | 34.78 | 1936–37 | 2015–16 | |
| Barnet | 5 | 3 | 0 | 2 | 5 | 4 | 0 | 1 | 10 | 7 | 0 | 3 | 70.00 | 1993–94 | 1999–00 | |
| Barnsley | 33 | 24 | 5 | 4 | 33 | 7 | 8 | 18 | 66 | 31 | 13 | 22 | 46.97 | 1925–26 | 2010–11 | |
| Barry Town | 2 | 2 | 0 | 0 | 2 | 1 | 0 | 1 | 4 | 3 | 0 | 1 | 75.00 | 1913–14 | 1914–15 | |
| Birmingham City | 14 | 4 | 3 | 7 | 14 | 2 | 4 | 8 | 28 | 6 | 15 | 7 | 21.43 | 1946–47 | 2008–09 | |
| Blackburn Rovers | 17 | 10 | 2 | 5 | 17 | 1 | 2 | 14 | 34 | 11 | 4 | 19 | 32.35 | 1936–37 | 2011–12 | |
| Blackpool | 21 | 11 | 6 | 4 | 21 | 1 | 10 | 10 | 42 | 12 | 16 | 14 | 28.57 | 1925–26 | 2009–10 | |
| Bolton Wanderers | 15 | 9 | 3 | 3 | 15 | 1 | 7 | 7 | 30 | 10 | 10 | 10 | 33.33 | 1933–34 | 2011–12 | |
| Boston United | 3 | 2 | 1 | 0 | 3 | 1 | 1 | 1 | 6 | 3 | 2 | 1 | 50.00 | 2002–03 | 2004–05 | |
| Bournemouth † | 25 | 14 | 6 | 5 | 24 | 7 | 4 | 13 | 49 | 21 | 10 | 18 | 42.86 | 1923–24 | 2015–16 | |
| Bradford City | 27 | 14 | 6 | 7 | 27 | 6 | 8 | 13 | 54 | 20 | 14 | 20 | 37.04 | 1925–26 | 2006–07 | |
| Bradford Park Avenue | 16 | 9 | 3 | 4 | 16 | 4 | 5 | 7 | 32 | 13 | 8 | 11 | 40.63 | 1928–29 | 1969–70 | |
| Brentford | 36 | 23 | 11 | 5 | 36 | 6 | 11 | 22 | 78 | 29 | 22 | 27 | 37.18 | 1913–14 | 2006–07 | |
| Brighton & Hove Albion | 29 | 14 | 11 | 4 | 29 | 9 | 12 | 8 | 58 | 23 | 23 | 12 | 39.66 | 1919–20 | 2007–08 | |
| Bristol City | 26 | 13 | 9 | 4 | 26 | 5 | 7 | 14 | 52 | 18 | 16 | 18 | 34.62 | 1922–23 | 2010–11 | |
| Bristol Rovers | 37 | 17 | 11 | 9 | 37 | 6 | 12 | 19 | 74 | 23 | 23 | 28 | 31.08 | 1919–20 | 2007–08 | |
| Burnley | 20 | 11 | 5 | 4 | 20 | 3 | 7 | 10 | 40 | 14 | 12 | 14 | 35.00 | 1930–31 | 2014–15 | |
| Caerphilly ‡ | 1 | 1 | 0 | 0 | 1 | 1 | 0 | 0 | 2 | 2 | 0 | 0 | 100.00 | 1913–14 | 1913–14 | |
| Cambridge United | 19 | 11 | 6 | 2 | 19 | 7 | 2 | 10 | 38 | 18 | 8 | 12 | 47.37 | 1974–75 | 2004–05 | |
| Cardiff City | 30 | 17 | 8 | 5 | 30 | 5 | 10 | 15 | 60 | 22 | 18 | 20 | 36.67 | 1912–13 | 2013–14 | |
| Carlisle United | 12 | 4 | 5 | 3 | 12 | 4 | 2 | 6 | 24 | 8 | 7 | 9 | 33.33 | 1978–79 | 2007–08 | |
| Charlton Athletic | 21 | 12 | 5 | 4 | 21 | 3 | 6 | 12 | 42 | 15 | 11 | 16 | 35.71 | 1921–22 | 2008–09 | |
| Chelsea † | 13 | 4 | 5 | 4 | 14 | 1 | 4 | 9 | 27 | 5 | 9 | 13 | 18.52 | 1925–26 | 2015–16 | |
| Cheltenham Town | 6 | 1 | 4 | 1 | 6 | 3 | 2 | 1 | 12 | 4 | 6 | 2 | 33.33 | 1999–00 | 2007–08 | |
| Chester City | 17 | 11 | 3 | 3 | 17 | 2 | 4 | 11 | 34 | 13 | 7 | 14 | 38.24 | 1967–68 | 2004–05 | |
| Chesterfield | 20 | 11 | 5 | 4 | 20 | 4 | 2 | 14 | 40 | 15 | 7 | 18 | 37.50 | 1931–32 | 2006–07 | |
| Colchester United | 12 | 6 | 2 | 4 | 12 | 3 | 3 | 6 | 24 | 9 | 5 | 10 | 37.50 | 1966–67 | 2005–06 | |
| Coventry City | 14 | 6 | 5 | 3 | 14 | 3 | 3 | 8 | 28 | 9 | 8 | 11 | 32.14 | 1914–15 | 2010–11 | |
| Crewe Alexandra | 15 | 11 | 1 | 3 | 15 | 3 | 6 | 6 | 30 | 14 | 7 | 9 | 46.67 | 1967–68 | 2007–08 | |
| Croydon Common | 2 | 1 | 1 | 0 | 2 | 0 | 0 | 2 | 4 | 1 | 1 | 2 | 25.00 | 1912–13 | 1913–14 | |
| Crystal Palace † | 11 | 5 | 4 | 2 | 12 | 4 | 3 | 5 | 23 | 9 | 7 | 7 | 39.13 | 1919–20 | 2015–16 | |
| Darlington | 22 | 13 | 7 | 2 | 22 | 2 | 9 | 11 | 44 | 15 | 16 | 13 | 34.09 | 1925–26 | 2004–05 | |
| Derby County | 18 | 12 | 3 | 3 | 18 | 7 | 2 | 9 | 36 | 19 | 5 | 12 | 52.78 | 1925–26 | 2010–11 | |
| Doncaster Rovers | 30 | 15 | 8 | 7 | 30 | 7 | 9 | 14 | 60 | 22 | 17 | 21 | 36.67 | 1935–36 | 2010–11 | |
| Ebbw Vale ‡ | 1 | 1 | 0 | 0 | 1 | 1 | 0 | 0 | 2 | 2 | 0 | 0 | 100.00 | 1914–15 | 1914–15 | |
| Everton † | 11 | 0 | 3 | 8 | 10 | 0 | 5 | 5 | 21 | 0 | 8 | 13 | 0.00 | 1930–31 | 2015–16 | |
| Exeter City | 29 | 19 | 4 | 6 | 29 | 7 | 5 | 17 | 58 | 26 | 9 | 23 | 44.83 | 1919–20 | 2002–03 | |
| Fulham | 31 | 17 | 7 | 7 | 31 | 7 | 2 | 22 | 62 | 24 | 9 | 29 | 38.71 | 1925–26 | 2013–14 | |
| Gillingham | 17 | 9 | 3 | 5 | 17 | 4 | 7 | 6 | 34 | 13 | 10 | 11 | 38.24 | 1919–20 | 2007–08 | |
| Halifax Town ‡ | 12 | 8 | 1 | 3 | 12 | 3 | 3 | 6 | 24 | 11 | 4 | 9 | 45.83 | 1967–68 | 2001–02 | |
| Hartlepool United | 20 | 11 | 6 | 3 | 20 | 9 | 4 | 7 | 40 | 20 | 10 | 10 | 50.00 | 1967–68 | 2007–08 | |
| Hereford United | 3 | 2 | 0 | 1 | 3 | 1 | 1 | 1 | 6 | 3 | 2 | 1 | 50.00 | 1986–87 | 1996–97 | |
| Huddersfield Town | 25 | 10 | 8 | 7 | 25 | 3 | 6 | 16 | 50 | 13 | 14 | 23 | 26.00 | 1952–53 | 2007–08 | |
| Hull City | 34 | 22 | 8 | 4 | 34 | 7 | 8 | 19 | 68 | 29 | 16 | 23 | 42.65 | 1925–26 | 2014–15 | |
| Ipswich Town | 13 | 7 | 5 | 1 | 13 | 4 | 3 | 6 | 26 | 11 | 8 | 7 | 42.31 | 1947–48 | 2010–11 | |
| Kidderminster Harriers | 4 | 2 | 1 | 1 | 4 | 2 | 1 | 1 | 8 | 4 | 2 | 2 | 50.00 | 2001–02 | 2004–05 | |
| Leeds United | 17 | 10 | 3 | 4 | 17 | 1 | 3 | 13 | 34 | 11 | 6 | 17 | 32.35 | 1927–28 | 2010–11 | |
| Leicester City † | 15 | 7 | 3 | 5 | 14 | 2 | 5 | 7 | 29 | 9 | 8 | 12 | 31.03 | 1935–36 | 2015–16 | |
| Leyton Orient | 36 | 17 | 9 | 10 | 36 | 10 | 8 | 18 | 72 | 27 | 17 | 28 | 37.50 | 1925–26 | 2007–08 | ^{[B]} |
| Lincoln City | 28 | 16 | 8 | 4 | 28 | 5 | 4 | 19 | 56 | 21 | 12 | 23 | 37.50 | 1932–33 | 2004–05 | |
| Liverpool † | 14 | 7 | 4 | 3 | 15 | 0 | 3 | 12 | 29 | 7 | 7 | 15 | 24.14 | 1954–55 | 2015–16 | |
| Llanelli | 3 | 2 | 1 | 0 | 3 | 1 | 0 | 2 | 6 | 3 | 1 | 2 | 50.00 | 1912–13 | 1914–15 | |
| Luton Town | 27 | 15 | 7 | 5 | 27 | 5 | 5 | 17 | 54 | 20 | 12 | 22 | 37.04 | 1912–13 | 2007–08 | |
| Macclesfield Town | 6 | 4 | 1 | 1 | 6 | 3 | 0 | 3 | 12 | 7 | 1 | 4 | 58.33 | 1997–98 | 2004–05 | |
| Manchester City † | 14 | 6 | 2 | 6 | 15 | 1 | 1 | 13 | 29 | 7 | 3 | 19 | 24.14 | 1926–27 | 2015–16 | |
| Manchester United † | 13 | 8 | 3 | 2 | 13 | 1 | 2 | 10 | 26 | 9 | 5 | 12 | 34.62 | 1931–32 | 2015–16 | |
| Mansfield Town | 18 | 10 | 1 | 7 | 18 | 3 | 5 | 10 | 36 | 13 | 6 | 17 | 36.11 | 1965–66 | 2004–05 | |
| Mardy ‡ | 2 | 2 | 0 | 0 | 2 | 1 | 0 | 1 | 4 | 3 | 0 | 1 | 75.00 | 1912–13 | 1913–14 | |
| Merthyr Town ‡ | 7 | 6 | 1 | 0 | 7 | 2 | 2 | 3 | 14 | 8 | 3 | 3 | 57.14 | 1914–15 | 1924–25 | |
| Mid Rhondda ‡ | 3 | 3 | 0 | 0 | 3 | 1 | 1 | 1 | 6 | 4 | 1 | 1 | 66.67 | 1912–13 | 1914–15 | |
| Middlesbrough | 19 | 10 | 4 | 5 | 19 | 3 | 4 | 12 | 38 | 13 | 8 | 17 | 34.21 | 1925–26 | 2010–11 | |
| Millwall | 21 | 9 | 6 | 6 | 21 | 5 | 4 | 12 | 42 | 14 | 10 | 18 | 33.33 | 1919–20 | 2010–11 | |
| Milton Keynes Dons | 1 | 1 | 0 | 0 | 1 | 1 | 0 | 0 | 2 | 2 | 0 | 0 | 100.00 | 2005–06 | 2005–06 | |
| Newcastle United † | 19 | 8 | 2 | 9 | 18 | 6 | 3 | 9 | 37 | 14 | 5 | 18 | 37.84 | 1934–35 | 2015–16 | |
| Newport County | 23 | 15 | 5 | 3 | 23 | 11 | 2 | 10 | 46 | 26 | 7 | 13 | 56.52 | 1912–13 | 1987–88 | |
| Northampton Town | 25 | 13 | 8 | 4 | 25 | 8 | 4 | 13 | 50 | 21 | 12 | 17 | 42.00 | 1919–20 | 2007–08 | |
| Norwich City † | 24 | 17 | 3 | 4 | 25 | 4 | 7 | 14 | 49 | 21 | 10 | 18 | 42.86 | 1919–20 | 2015–16 | |
| Nottingham Forest | 29 | 16 | 5 | 8 | 29 | 5 | 8 | 16 | 58 | 21 | 13 | 24 | 36.21 | 1925–26 | 2010–11 | |
| Notts County | 34 | 18 | 11 | 5 | 34 | 11 | 5 | 18 | 68 | 29 | 16 | 23 | 42.65 | 1926–27 | 2004–05 | |
| Oldham Athletic | 23 | 13 | 8 | 2 | 23 | 2 | 9 | 12 | 46 | 15 | 17 | 14 | 32.61 | 1925–26 | 2007–08 | |
| Oxford United | 10 | 3 | 4 | 3 | 10 | 4 | 1 | 5 | 20 | 7 | 5 | 8 | 35.00 | 1965–66 | 2004–05 | |
| Peterborough United | 16 | 6 | 7 | 3 | 16 | 4 | 6 | 6 | 32 | 10 | 13 | 9 | 31.25 | 1965–66 | 2009–10 | |
| Plymouth Argyle | 41 | 24 | 7 | 10 | 41 | 9 | 11 | 21 | 82 | 33 | 18 | 31 | 40.24 | 1919–20 | 2009–10 | |
| Pontypridd ‡ | 3 | 2 | 1 | 0 | 3 | 2 | 1 | 0 | 6 | 4 | 2 | 0 | 66.67 | 1912–13 | 1914–15 | |
| Port Vale | 28 | 15 | 7 | 6 | 28 | 6 | 4 | 18 | 56 | 21 | 11 | 24 | 37.50 | 1925–26 | 2007–08 | |
| Portsmouth | 14 | 3 | 9 | 2 | 14 | 2 | 5 | 7 | 28 | 5 | 14 | 9 | 17.86 | 1919–20 | 2010–11 | |
| Preston North End | 28 | 18 | 6 | 4 | 28 | 3 | 10 | 15 | 56 | 21 | 16 | 19 | 37.50 | 1925–26 | 2010–11 | |
| Queens Park Rangers | 20 | 11 | 3 | 6 | 20 | 1 | 10 | 9 | 40 | 12 | 13 | 15 | 30.00 | 1919–20 | 2014–15 | |
| Reading | 33 | 18 | 6 | 9 | 33 | 9 | 6 | 18 | 66 | 27 | 12 | 27 | 40.91 | 1919–20 | 2012–13 | |
| Rochdale | 19 | 10 | 6 | 3 | 19 | 8 | 4 | 7 | 38 | 18 | 10 | 10 | 47.37 | 1967–68 | 2004–05 | |
| Rotherham United | 34 | 15 | 12 | 7 | 34 | 8 | 10 | 16 | 68 | 23 | 22 | 23 | 33.82 | 1951–52 | 2006–07 | |
| Rushden & Diamonds | 3 | 1 | 2 | 0 | 3 | 1 | 1 | 1 | 6 | 2 | 3 | 1 | 33.33 | 2001–02 | 2004–05 | |
| Scarborough | 4 | 2 | 1 | 1 | 4 | 1 | 0 | 3 | 8 | 3 | 1 | 4 | 37.50 | 1987–88 | 1998–99 | |
| Scunthorpe United | 29 | 18 | 5 | 6 | 29 | 7 | 8 | 14 | 58 | 25 | 13 | 20 | 43.10 | 1958–59 | 2010–11 | |
| Sheffield United | 18 | 8 | 3 | 7 | 18 | 1 | 6 | 11 | 36 | 9 | 9 | 18 | 25.00 | 1934–35 | 2010–11 | |
| Sheffield Wednesday | 13 | 4 | 4 | 5 | 13 | 1 | 6 | 6 | 26 | 5 | 10 | 11 | 19.23 | 1925–26 | 2009–10 | ^{[C]} |
| Shrewsbury Town | 21 | 9 | 5 | 7 | 21 | 3 | 8 | 10 | 42 | 12 | 13 | 17 | 28.57 | 1965–66 | 2004–05 | |
| South Shields ‡ | 3 | 2 | 0 | 1 | 3 | 1 | 0 | 2 | 6 | 3 | 0 | 3 | 50.00 | 1925–26 | 1927–28 | |
| Southampton † | 33 | 14 | 10 | 9 | 34 | 6 | 5 | 23 | 67 | 20 | 15 | 32 | 29.85 | 1919–20 | 2015–16 | |
| Southend United | 28 | 17 | 8 | 3 | 28 | 8 | 6 | 14 | 56 | 25 | 14 | 17 | 44.64 | 1912–13 | 2007–08 | |
| Southport | 4 | 2 | 2 | 0 | 4 | 2 | 1 | 1 | 8 | 4 | 3 | 1 | 50.00 | 1974–75 | 1977–78 | |
| Stalybridge Celtic | 1 | 1 | 0 | 0 | 1 | 0 | 0 | 1 | 2 | 1 | 0 | 1 | 50.00 | 1914–15 | 1914–15 | |
| Stockport County | 14 | 8 | 3 | 3 | 14 | 4 | 1 | 9 | 28 | 12 | 4 | 12 | 42.86 | 1925–26 | 1995–96 | |
| Stoke City † | 30 | 13 | 11 | 6 | 29 | 5 | 6 | 18 | 59 | 18 | 17 | 24 | 30.51 | 1913–14 | 2015–16 | ^{[D]} |
| Sunderland † | 14 | 5 | 5 | 4 | 14 | 2 | 5 | 7 | 28 | 7 | 10 | 11 | 25.00 | 1958–59 | 2015–16 | |
| Swindon Town | 17 | 9 | 5 | 3 | 17 | 2 | 5 | 10 | 34 | 11 | 10 | 13 | 32.35 | 1919–20 | 2007–08 | |
| Ton Pentre | 3 | 2 | 1 | 0 | 3 | 1 | 1 | 1 | 6 | 3 | 2 | 1 | 50.00 | 1912–13 | 1914–15 | |
| Torquay United | 20 | 7 | 7 | 6 | 20 | 8 | 5 | 7 | 40 | 15 | 12 | 13 | 37.50 | 1947–48 | 2003–04 | |
| Tottenham Hotspur † | 18 | 6 | 5 | 7 | 17 | 0 | 2 | 15 | 35 | 6 | 7 | 22 | 17.14 | 1928–29 | 2015–16 | |
| Tranmere Rovers | 13 | 5 | 7 | 1 | 13 | 4 | 5 | 4 | 26 | 9 | 12 | 5 | 34.62 | 1938–39 | 2007–08 | |
| Treharris | 2 | 2 | 0 | 0 | 2 | 2 | 0 | 0 | 4 | 4 | 0 | 0 | 100.00 | 1912–13 | 1913–14 | |
| Walsall | 17 | 11 | 4 | 2 | 17 | 5 | 5 | 7 | 34 | 16 | 9 | 9 | 47.06 | 1947–48 | 2007–08 | |
| Watford † | 21 | 13 | 5 | 3 | 22 | 6 | 4 | 12 | 43 | 19 | 9 | 15 | 44.19 | 1919–20 | 2015–16 | |
| West Bromwich Albion † | 16 | 10 | 3 | 3 | 15 | 4 | 3 | 8 | 31 | 14 | 6 | 11 | 45.16 | 1927–28 | 2015–16 | |
| West Ham United † | 24 | 14 | 6 | 4 | 25 | 1 | 6 | 18 | 49 | 15 | 12 | 22 | 30.61 | 1932–33 | 2015–16 | |
| Wigan Athletic | 11 | 5 | 3 | 3 | 11 | 5 | 0 | 6 | 22 | 10 | 3 | 9 | 45.45 | 1984–85 | 2012–13 | |
| Wimbledon ‡ | 1 | 1 | 0 | 0 | 1 | 0 | 1 | 0 | 2 | 1 | 1 | 0 | 50.00 | 1977–78 | 1977–78 | ^{[E]} |
| Wolverhampton Wanderers | 14 | 5 | 5 | 4 | 14 | 3 | 5 | 6 | 28 | 8 | 10 | 10 | 28.57 | 1925–26 | 2011–12 | |
| Workington | 9 | 5 | 2 | 2 | 9 | 2 | 2 | 5 | 18 | 7 | 4 | 7 | 38.89 | 1965–66 | 1976–77 | |
| Wrexham | 15 | 7 | 3 | 5 | 15 | 1 | 4 | 10 | 30 | 8 | 7 | 15 | 26.67 | 1967–68 | 2002–03 | |
| Wycombe Wanderers | 4 | 1 | 2 | 1 | 4 | 2 | 0 | 2 | 8 | 3 | 2 | 3 | 37.50 | 1994–95 | 2004–05 | |
| Yeovil Town | 5 | 2 | 1 | 2 | 5 | 1 | 0 | 4 | 10 | 3 | 1 | 6 | 30.00 | 2003–04 | 2007–08 | |
| York City | 16 | 6 | 4 | 6 | 16 | 3 | 3 | 10 | 32 | 9 | 7 | 16 | 28.13 | 1965–66 | 2003–04 | |

a Results in the Southern League sourced from the Jones, Colin (2012): Swansea Town & City Football Club: The Complete Record. Results in The Football League post-1920 and the Premier League sourced to Statto.

== See also ==
- List of Swansea City A.F.C. records and statistics
- List of Swansea City A.F.C. seasons

== Footnotes ==
B. Record against Clapton Orient included
C. Record against The Wednesday included
D. Record against Stoke included
E. Wimbledon relocated to Milton Keynes in 2004 and were re-branded as Milton Keynes Dons F.C. In 2008 the club renounced all claims to Wimbledon's history, and regarded themselves as a new club founded in 2004.
