= Ivor Allchurch =

Welsh footballer (1929-1997)

Ivor Allchurch MBE
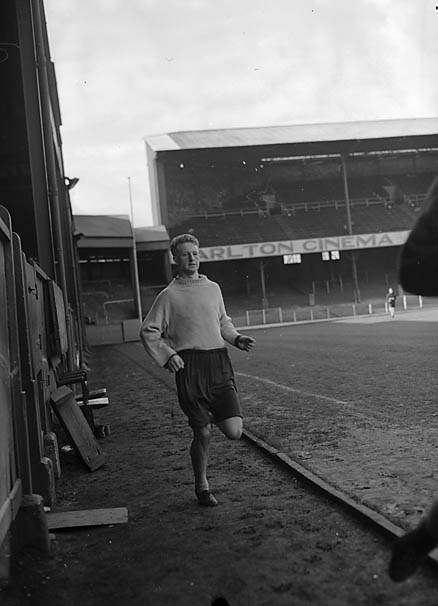
- Allchurch training with Swansea Town in 1951

Personal information
- Full name: Ivor John Allchurch
- Date of birth: 16 October 1929
- Place of birth: Swansea, Wales
- Date of death: 10 July 1997 (aged 67)
- Place of death: Swansea, Wales
- Height: 5 ft 10 in (1.78 m)
- Position: Inside forward

Senior career*
Years	Team	Apps	(Gls)
1947–1958	Swansea Town	327	(124)
1958–1962	Newcastle United	143	(46)
1962–1965	Cardiff City	103	(39)
1965–1968	Swansea Town	118	(40)
1968–	Worcester City		
- Haverfordwest County
–1979	Pontardawe Athletic		
Total		691+	(249+)

International career
1950–1966	Wales	68	(23)

Managerial career
- Haverfordwest County (player manager)
- * Club domestic league appearances and goals

Ivor John Allchurch MBE (16 October 1929 – 10 July 1997) was a Welsh professional footballer who played as an inside forward.

Known as the "Golden Boy of Welsh football", Allchurch began his career playing for his hometown side Swansea Town, where he spent over 10 years, captaining the side for several seasons and scoring over 100 goals in all competitions. He attracted attention from numerous clubs during his early years with Swansea, but chose to remain with the club until the age of 28, when he joined First Division side Newcastle United. Signing in 1958 for a fee of £28,000, he formed a prolific strike partnership with George Eastham and Len White. In 1962, he joined Cardiff City for £18,000, where he spent three seasons, before finishing his professional career with a second spell with Swansea Town. His two spells with Swansea saw him become the club's all-time top goalscorer.

During his career, Allchurch won a total of 68 caps for Wales, a record which stood until 1986 when it was exceeded by Joey Jones. He also jointly held the record number of goals scored for Wales, along with Trevor Ford, 23, which was eventually broken by Ian Rush. His talents were more widely recognised after his performance for Wales during the 1958 FIFA World Cup, in which he scored twice and helped them to reach the quarter-finals. His brother Len was also a footballer and the pair played alongside each other for Wales on several occasions.

== Early life ==
Ivor John Allchurch was born on Waun-wen Road in Swansea on 16 October 1929. His parents, Charles Wilfried Allchurch and Mabel Sarah Allchurch (née Miller), were originally from Dudley in Worcestershire but had moved to South Wales during the Post–World War I recession in search of work, following Mabel's parents to the Swansea area. His father had worked as a banksman in Dudley but found employment in Swansea as a furnace man.

Allchurch was the sixth of seven children, with two sisters and four brothers, who grew up in a three bedroomed house on Landeg Street in Plasmarl. Including his parents and his siblings, the house was home to eleven people, including his step brother Willie and his niece Christine who was raised by Allchurch's mother. As a child, he attended Plasmarl School, leaving at the age of 14 to find work. After leaving, Allchurch worked in an office at Baldwin's Foundry, a company that manufactured bomb casings, but grew frustrated in the role and quickly looked to move on. He instead took up work as a porter in a local fish market, after noticing that the younger boys working there were frequently allowed early finishes during winter time due to a lack of stock in wartime which allowed them to play football on a regular basis. The job also allowed him to supplement his income as each worker was allowed to take any remaining stock to sell of their own accord once a week, a task that Allchurch would undertake with his brother Len.

Allchurch's brothers were also keen footballers, Charlie and Arthur both played football in local leagues, Arthur represented Wales at amateur level and Len played professionally for Swansea Town, Sheffield United and Stockport County as well as representing Wales.

== Playing career ==
=== Youth and wartime ===
Allchurch was playing local youth football at under-18 Cwm Level Park when he was spotted by Joe Sykes, a scout who worked for Swansea Town under the management of Haydn Green. Following a match, Sykes approached Allchurch, who was only 14 at the time, and asked for his name and address, visiting the family home soon after where he reached an agreement with Allchurch's father that he would join the club when he turned 15 as an amateur and train two days a week. During his time as an amateur at the club, Allchurch was approached on two occasions by scouts from Football League sides to sign for different clubs but turned the moves down as he did not want to break the verbal agreement that he and his father had made to sign for the Swans.

In 1948, when he had turned 18, Allchurch was called up to start his National Service and enlisted as a gunner in the British Army. Stationed in Oswestry, he continued to play football for the representative sides of his unit and Western Command. His performances for the teams in November 1948 attracted the attention of Shrewsbury Town manager Leslie Knighton who signed Allchurch to represent the side in the Midland Football League during his military service, describing him as "a future star". He made his debut at Gay Meadow in the same month and remained with the club for the rest of the 1948–49 season. During his time at the club, Knighton turned down numerous offers from Football League sides for Allchurch, as he was still registered to play for Swansea Town, and described him as a "second Charlie Buchan." At the start of the following season, Allchurch also played for Wellington Town before he was demobilised from his military service, allowing him to return to Swansea.

=== Swansea Town ===
He returned to Swansea in 1949, where manager Billy McCandless had already received offers for Allchurch even though he had not made his professional debut. Despite the interest, Allchurch joined a side that had won promotion comfortably from the Football League Third Division South the previous year and the favoured attacking partnership of Sammy McCrory and Billy Lucas meant that Allchurch continued to play for the club's reserve side in The Football Combination. He eventually received his first call up to the first team on Boxing Day 1949 at the age of 20, making his debut in a 3–0 defeat to West Ham United. Although the Swans lost, Allchurch impressed enough to be handed a second start on 7 January 1950, scoring his first senior goal for the club in a 3–0 victory over First Division side Birmingham City in the third round of the FA Cup. In the next round, Swansea suffered a 2–1 defeat to eventual winners Arsenal but Allchurch again made headlines for his performance with Arsenal player Joe Mercer later commenting that he "nearly frightened us to death" as McCandless and the Swansea board were again forced to fend off offers from several clubs. He also claimed a Welsh Cup winners' medal at the end of the 1949–50 season, playing in a 4–1 victory over Wrexham in the final on 27 April 1950.

During this period, Swansea suffered from financial difficulties which saw the sale of several first team players such as McCrory, Jim Feeney and Roy Paul. This allowed Allchurch and a number of other youth players, including Terry Medwin and John King to establish themselves in the squad, Allchurch becoming the youngest player in the club's history to be ever present during an entire season, having played in every league game for the club, during the 1950–51 season. Further approaches from Liverpool, Wolverhampton Wanderers and Manchester City were also rejected by the Swans. However, the side struggled to perform in the Second Division, finishing in 18th and 19th positions between 1950 and 1952, and Allchurch contemplated a move away from Vetch Field after being encouraged by some teammates at international level to move to a First Division side.

Allchurch was persuaded to remain at the club, encouraged by Sykes and McCandless' belief in a number of local youth players making their way through the Swans setup, including Cliff Jones, Harry Griffiths and Allchurch's brother Len. In September 1952, Swansea rejected a bid of £30,000 from Arsenal for Allchurch, the bid just £5,000 below the British record transfer fee that Sheffield Wednesday had paid for Jackie Sewell a year previously. He finished the 1952–53 season as the club's second highest top scorer with 15 goals, including his first career hattrick during a 3–2 victory over Brentford on 6 April 1953. The Swans attacking trio of Allchurch, Medwin and Griffiths accounted for more than half of the club's league goals during the season.

In 1955, the club was rocked by the sudden death of manager McCandless, days after the players had returned to pre-season training. The Swansea board decided against appointing a permanent replacement, instead establishing a three-man selection committee consisting of Allchurch, Ron Burgess and Joe Sykes, with Burgess being given the title of "team manager". Under the guidance of the trio, the Swans were able to mount a serious promotion challenge, going unbeaten in eleven games between September and December 1955. However, following a serious injury to defender Tom Kiley, the committee fell out with the Swansea board over their refusal to provide funds to secure a replacement for Kiley, Burgess having transfers for Bob McKinlay and Jimmy Dugdale rejected by the board. The loss of Kiley and the conflict with the board saw Swansea lose 7 of their last 8 matches of the season, eventually finishing in 10th position. His growing frustration at the club's refusal to invest in the squad and a strained relationship with new manager Trevor Morris led Allchurch to announce his decision to leave the club, stating in his own newspaper column "I am ready to admit that I had high hopes that my own club would get promotion a couple of years ago [...] then I would have been happy to end my career in the town [...] But that dream does not look like coming true". Morris later used the money from Allchurch's transfer to sign Colin Webster and Reg Davies.

=== Newcastle United ===
==== First Division ====
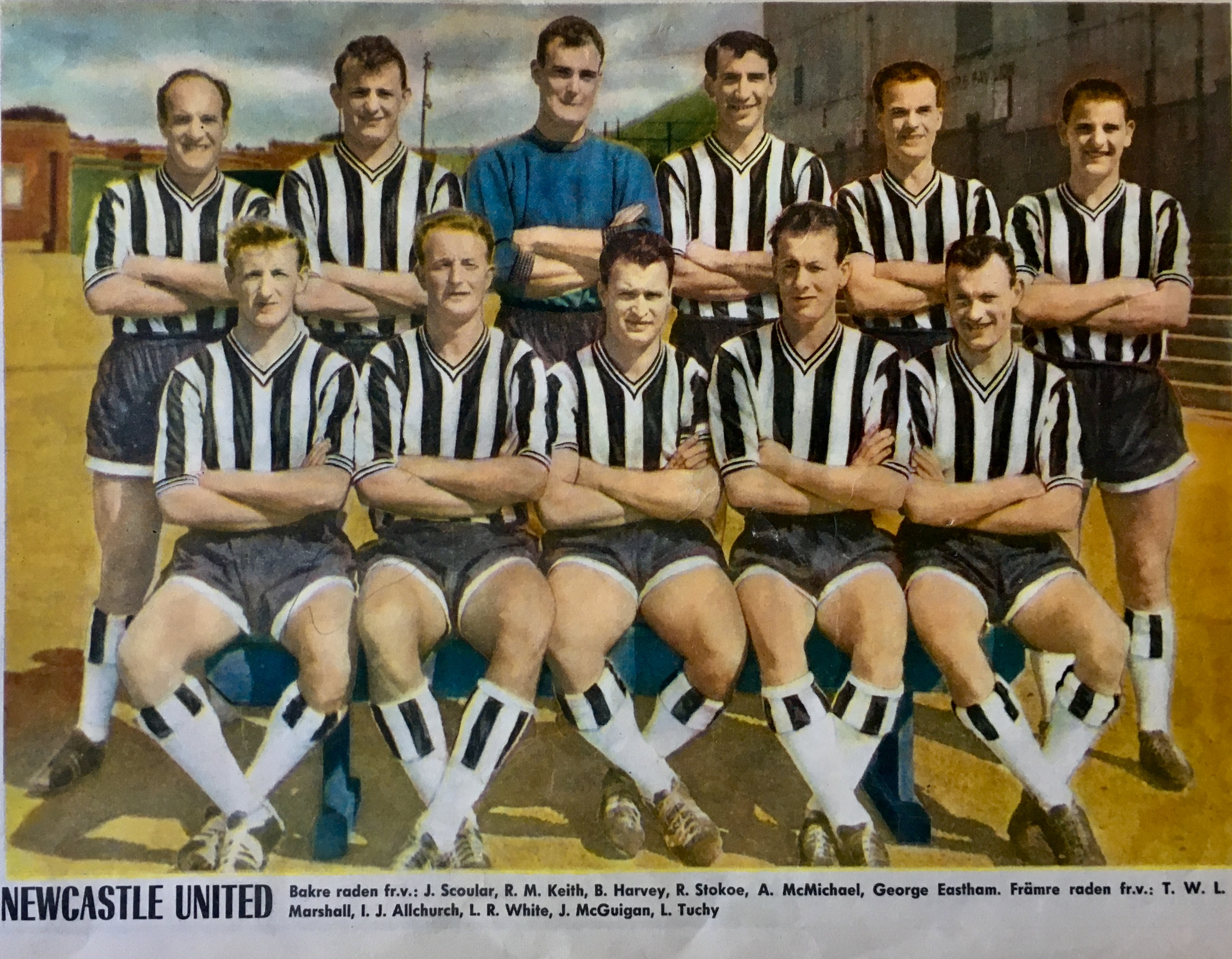
Newcastle United F.C. in 1960 with this players – from the left, standing: Jimmy Scoular, Dick Keith, Bryan Harvey (goalkeeper), Bob Stokoe, Alf McMichael and George Eastham; sitting: Terry Marshall, Ivor Allchurch, Len White, John McGuigan and Liam Tuohy.

Allchurch's decision to leave the Swans saw a large amount of interest, with Liverpool offering to fly a private plane to South Wales and meet any valuation Swansea placed on him. Liverpool chairman Tom Williams and manager Phil Taylor also travelled to meet Allchurch, but were rejected as he wished to move to a team in the First Division. Aston Villa had an offer accepted, but Newcastle United chairman Alderman McKeag quickly offered an increased amount of £28,000. On 10 October 1958, Allchurch travelled to Manchester to meet Newcastle manager Charlie Mitten, where he was convinced to join Newcastle, signing his contract on a luggage trolley at Manchester Exchange railway station. Despite having never met his new teammates, he made his debut for the club, his first match in the First Division, the following day against Leicester City, scoring twice during a 3–1 victory. He joined the club's established strike partnership of George Eastham and Len White, the trio going on to score 48 of the club's 81 goals during the course of the 1958–59 season with Allchurch finishing as the club's second top scorer behind White despite missing more than a quarter of the season.

Despite early season optimism, Newcastle began the 1959–60 campaign in poor form, suffering a 5–1 defeat to Tottenham Hotspur on the opening day of the season and found themselves in 18th place by October having lost 8 of their first 15 matches. With the club struggling, the board denied Allchurch permission to be released to play a fixture for Wales in order to focus on the club's fortunes, which saw an aggrieved Allchurch hand in a transfer request as he believed the club had "broken their word" after a verbal agreement between himself and Mitten that he would be released for any international fixtures. After a number of changes by Mitten, Newcastle were able to return to form and his transfer request was eventually dropped as the Magpies finished the season in 8th position, Allchurch again reaching double figure league goals during the season for the second consecutive year in the First Division.

==== Decline ====
The following season saw a tumultuous period for the club with Eastham submitting a transfer request and refusing to return to training after the club rejected his request. Allchurch himself submitted another rejected transfer request, this time due to his wish to return to South Wales in order for his wife Esme to be near her family during a new pregnancy following the loss of a child during her previous pregnancy. The club again started poorly and Mitten switched Allchurch from his usual inside-forward role to the number nine position in order to be used as the club's main striker in an attempt to improve results but Allchurch grew frustrated with the decision, backing Len White as the club's best centre-forward and even refusing to play on three occasions over the decision. Mitten eventually backed down and, following reassurance over his wife's condition, Allchurch withdrew his transfer request. Later in the season, following an injury to captain Jimmy Scoular, Allchurch was elected as the stand in captain by the squad. Teammate Bob Stokoe commented that "there's no one better equipped for the job". However, Newcastle were unable to turn their season around and suffered relegation to the Second Division in May 1961.

Relegation further fueled talk of Allchurch leaving Newcastle. Manager Mitten appointed Allchurch as permanent team captain for the start of their season, having commented that he had been impressed by his dedication, and stated in a newspaper interview "With the maximum wage restriction removed we can afford to pay Allchurch in relation to his value to United, which is tremendous! Tell me where and at what cost can we replace him?" The abolition of the maximum wage cap had seen Allchurch's wages rise to £60 per week. During the season, Allchurch was one of just two players who appeared in more than 30 matches, along with Dick Keith, as the club rotated players in an attempt to find form. He later resigned from his position as captain after the Newcastle board again attempted to block his call up to the Welsh national side. The death of a prematurely born daughter affected Allchurch's form as he looked after his children during his wife's recovery and the personal difficulty during this period convinced Allchurch to announce his intention to leave the club and move closer to his wider family.

=== Cardiff City ===
In August 1962, he joined Cardiff City, who had been relegated from the First Division the previous season, for a fee of £18,000. The club board had drawn criticism from fans for signing older Welsh players who were seen as "faded stars", such as Trevor Ford and Mel Charles, in previous seasons but pushed forward to complete the signing of then 32-year old Allchurch. Taking a £20 per week pay cut to join the Bluebirds, Allchurch made his debut on the opening day of the 1962–63 season, captaining the side and scoring in a 4–4 draw with his former club Newcastle United. In the following weeks, local newspapers attributed the club's positive start to the season to Allchurch's leadership, with the South Wales Echo claiming that he was "one of the best skippers the club has ever had". But despite this and a prolific forward partnership formed between Allchurch and Peter Hooper, who scored 34 league goals between them, the club eventually faded into a mid-table place, finishing in tenth position.

Prior to the start of the 1963–64 season, the club saw the departures of several key players, including Hooper and Alan Durban. The signing of fellow Welsh international John Charles had raised hopes of improvement but the side struggled throughout the season, winning just 14 league matches out of 42. Allchurch finished as the club's top league scorer, scoring 12 times including a hat-trick against Sunderland in September 1963. The club's struggles saw George Swindin dismissed as manager and replaced by Jimmy Scoular, who had captained Newcastle during Allchurch's spell in the North-East. Allchurch found Scoular's loud and vocal form of management difficult and in mid-October 1964, found himself dropped from the side after recovering from a brief thigh injury as Scoular favoured playing Peter King in his place. He did not return to the first team until February, during which time he stated his desire to leave the club, when Scoular was forced to recall him after the Bluebirds had suffered a severe decline during his absence. Scoular had introduced a new youth policy within the squad, handing regular places to players such as King, George Johnston and Don Murray. Murray later commented that he regarded it as a privilege to play alongside Allchurch and Charles and stated "There was a saying among the players, if you are in trouble give it to Ivor".

He scored nine times following his return to the first team, including a hat-trick against his former side Swansea which condemned them to relegation into the Third Division, to finish as the club's top goalscorer for the second consecutive season. He also made his debut in European competition, as Cardiff qualified for the European Cup Winners' Cup having won the Welsh Cup the previous year, playing in a 0–0 draw with Danish side Esbjerg fB in the first round. He played his final match for the club on 24 April 1965, scoring Cardiff's first goal during a 3–1 victory over Rotherham United.

=== Later career ===
At the age of 35, Allchurch returned to his hometown club Swansea Town in 1965, after they agreed a fee of £8000 with Cardiff to complete the transfer. His return to Vetch Field saw a significant increase in the sale of season tickets and Allchurch was greeted by a large "welcome home Ivor" banner in his first game on his return. However, early season form was poor as the side struggled to adapt to a new "modern" gameplan adopted by manager Glyn Davies, losing 3 of their first 4 matches. Allchurch handed the club their first win of the season, scoring the only goal of the game during a 1–0 victory over Grimsby Town but, by October, the club were struggling at the foot of the table. In December 1965, First Division side Northampton Town offered £11,000 to sign Allchurch but he himself rejected the offer saying it was "flattering" but that he was "happy to be back with Swansea". The following month, in the New Years honours list in 1966, Allchurch was awarded an MBE for his services to sport. The club finished the season in the bottom half of the table but did win the Welsh Cup, defeating Chester City in the final with Allchurch scoring the winning goal.

Swansea's troubles continued the following season, amassing just six points during the first third of the season and suffering a 5–1 aggregate defeat against Bulgarian side Slavia Sofia in the opening round of the European Cup Winners' Cup, with the club board accusing some players of a "lack of effort". Davies' contract as manager was cancelled by mutual consent and long serving club trainer Joe Sykes was temporarily appointed manager with Allchurch part of his selection committee. Sykes also handed the club captaincy to Allchurch, replacing Brian Purcell, but the club eventually suffered relegation to the Fourth Division at the end of the 1966–67 season. He remained with the club, entering the final year of his contract, but was switched to playing as a striker by manager Billy Lucas in order to lessen the amount of running required of Allchurch who had turned 38 during the opening months of the season. The change of position benefited him, scoring seventeen times in the league in forty matches. Approaching the end of the season, he was offered a one-year extension to his contract with the club, with a £5 per week pay cut, but eventually decided to retire from professional football, making his final appearance on 6 May 1968 against Hartlepools United. He retired from professional football as Swansea's all-time record goalscorer.

He joined Worcester City in 1968, and he had a spell as player-manager of Haverfordwest County before ending his career at Pontardawe Athletic in 1979.

== International career ==
Allchurch was called up to the Wales senior squad for the first time at the age of 21, having made just 30 senior league appearances for Swansea, making his international debut in a 4–2 defeat to England on 15 November 1950 at Roker Park in the 1950–51 British Home Championship. He would remain a regular fixture in the Wales side, making a further 26 consecutive appearances for his country after his debut over the following six years, and was part of the squad that qualified for the 1958 FIFA World Cup by defeating Israel in a play-off match, scoring in both legs of the tie.

He was chosen in the squad for the finals in Sweden and scored seven times in a 19–0 victory over a local amateur side during a warm-up match. He played in all three of Wales' group matches, scoring in a 1–1 draw with Mexico, and scored their first goal in a 2–1 victory over Hungary in a play-off match to reach the quarter-finals. They lost 1–0 to eventual winners Brazil in the quarter-finals following a goal from Pelé. Following the tournament, Wales international Dave Bowen commented that they had "surprised a lot of people" with their performance and also praised Allchurch, stating "they looked at Ivor and wondered where he had been hiding. He could have played for any of the teams out there, including Brazil".

In 1962, he won his 50th international cap in a match against Scotland, becoming Wales' most capped player of all-time having overtaken the previous record holder Billy Meredith. He played his final game for his country against Chile in 1966. In all, Allchurch played 68 times for Wales, scoring 23 goals. His caps record stood for nearly twenty years until it was beaten by Joey Jones and his 23 goals tied Trevor Ford as Wales' highest scoring player until Ian Rush later overtook the pair.

== Personal life ==
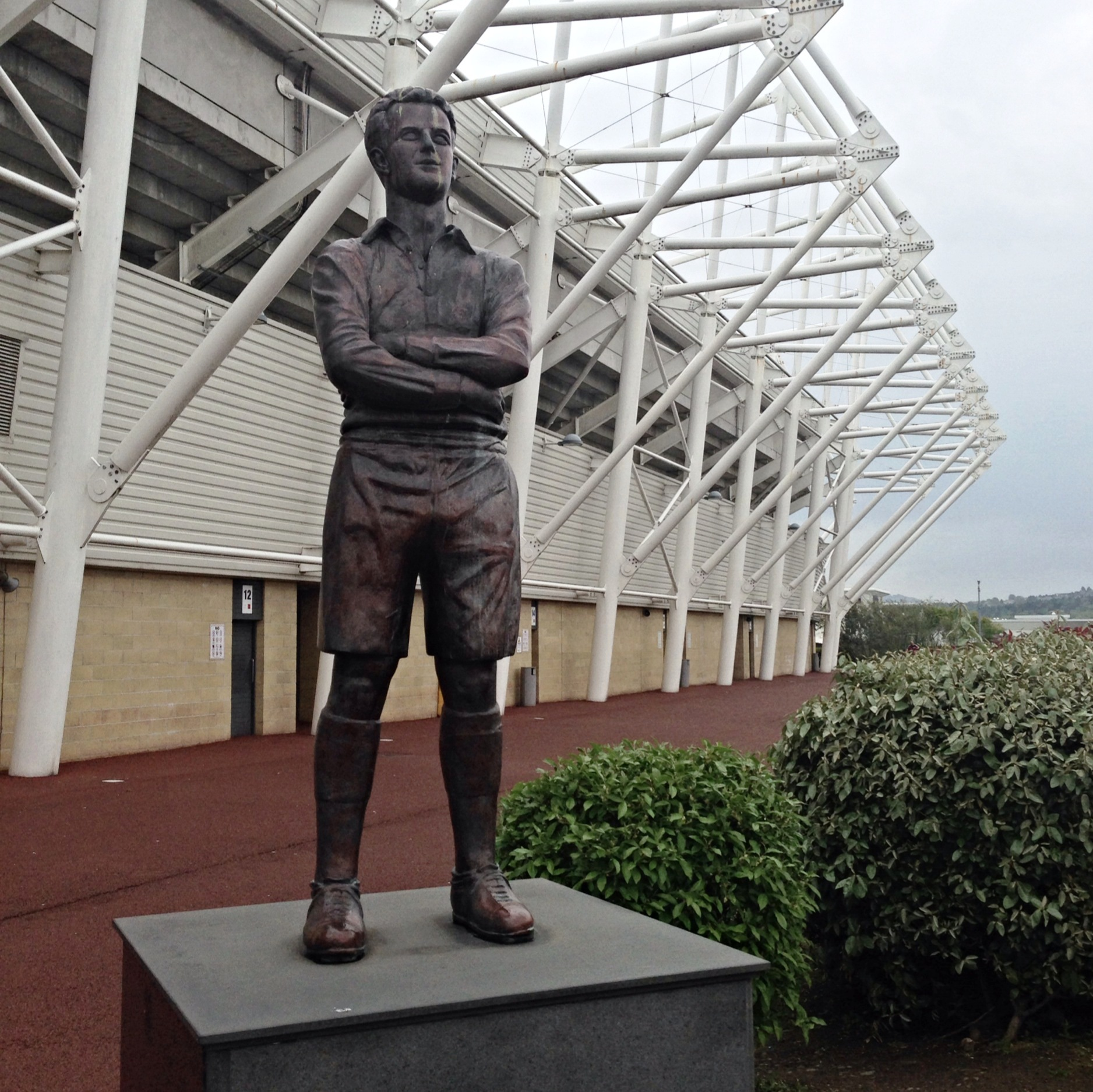
Statue of Allchurch outside the Liberty Stadium, Swansea

Following his return from national service, Allchurch became engaged to Esme Thomas who was 16 at the time, the couple keeping their engagement secret from their parents until she turned 18. The pair publicly revealed their engagement when she turned 18 and eventually married in 1953, settling in the Mumbles district of Swansea. The couple had two sons, John and David. Following Allchurch's transfer to Newcastle in 1958, the family relocated to Kenton, Newcastle upon Tyne.

He was named BBC Wales Sports Personality of the Year in 1962 and, in 1966, he was awarded a Most Excellent Order of the British Empire (MBE) in recognition of his services to Welsh football. He is also a member of the Welsh Sports Hall of Fame and the English Football Hall of Fame having been inducted in 1995 and 2005 respectively. Allchurch and his wife moved to a bungalow in Bishopston, Swansea after his retirement from professional football and he worked as a storeman for a stationery company. He died on 10 July 1997 at his home aged 67. His funeral was held at Swansea Crematorium and attracted over 500 people.

To celebrate Allchurch's achievements for his local club, it was originally decided that money should be raised for a bust of him, which was raised by Swansea City supporters. However, the strong support eventually saw the plans changed to incorporate a statue outside their stadium. In 2005, a life-sized statue of Allchurch was unveiled outside Swansea's newly opened Liberty Stadium.

== Career statistics ==
=== Club ===
Club	Season	League			FA Cup		League Cup (Note: The Football League Cup was first held in 1960.)		Other (Note: Includes other competitive competitions, including the Welsh Cup and the European Cup Winners' Cup.)		Total	
Club	Season	Division	Apps	Goals	Apps	Goals	Apps	Goals	Apps	Goals	Apps	Goals
Swansea Town	1949–50	Second Division	18	3	2	1	—		2	1	22	5
Swansea Town	1950–51	Second Division	42	8	1	0	—		1	1	44	9
Swansea Town	1951–52	Second Division	41	11	3	3	—		0	0	44	14
Swansea Town	1952–53	Second Division	41	15	1	0	—		1	0	43	15
Swansea Town	1953–54	Second Division	40	18	3	2	—		0	0	43	20
Swansea Town	1954–55	Second Division	36	19	4	1	—		3	2	43	22
Swansea Town	1955–56	Second Division	37	15	1	0	—		3	3	41	18
Swansea Town	1956–57	Second Division	30	13	1	1	—		4	1	35	15
Swansea Town	1957–58	Second Division	32	16	1	0	—		0	0	33	16
Swansea Town	1958–59	Second Division	10	6	0	0	—		0	0	10	6
Swansea Town	Total		327	124	17	8	—		14	8	358	140
Newcastle United	1958–59	First Division	26	16	1	0	—		0	0	27	16
Newcastle United	1959–60	First Division	41	13	2	1	—		0	0	43	14
Newcastle United	1960–61	First Division	36	7	4	3	1	0	0	0	41	10
Newcastle United	1961–62	Second Division	40	10	1	0	2	1	0	0	43	11
Newcastle United	Total		143	46	8	4	3	1	0	0	154	51
Cardiff City	1962–63	Second Division	35	12	1	0	1	0	2	2	39	14
Cardiff City	1963–64	Second Division	41	12	1	0	3	0	7	2	52	14
Cardiff City	1964–65	Second Division	27	15	0	0	1	0	7	4	35	19
Cardiff City	Total		103	39	2	0	5	0	16	8	126	47
Swansea Town	1965–66	Third Division	34	12	1	0	1	1	7	3	43	16
Swansea Town	1966–67	Third Division	44	11	3	0	4	2	3	0	54	13
Swansea Town	1967–68	Fourth Division	40	17	4	1	1	1	2	2	47	21
Swansea Town	Total		118	40	8	1	6	4	12	5	144	50
Total			691	249	35	13	14	5	42	21	782	288

=== International ===
Appearances and goals by national team and year
National team	Year	Apps	Goals
Wales	1950	1	0
Wales	1951	6	3
Wales	1952	3	1
Wales	1953	5	3
Wales	1954	5	1
Wales	1955	4	0
Wales	1956	3	0
Wales	1957	0	0
Wales	1958	10	4
Wales	1959	0	0
Wales	1960	0	0
Wales	1961	6	3
Wales	1962	6	2
Wales	1963	3	0
Wales	1964	2	0
Wales	1965	8	5
Wales	1966	3	0
Total		68	22

== Honours ==
Swansea Town

- Welsh Cup: 1950, 1966

Cardiff City

- Welsh Cup: 1964, 1965

== Bibliography ==
- Farmer, David; Stead, Peter (1998), Ivor Allchurch M.B.E., Swansea: Christopher Davies (Publishing) Ltd., ISBN 0-7154-0733-3
