= Joe Sykes =

Joe Sykes may refer to:

- Trumaine Sykes (born 1982), known as Joe, American football defensive end
- Joe Sykes (footballer), English footballer
