= 1931–32 Football League =

40th season of the Football League

The Football League
- Season: 1931–32
- Champions: Everton
- Relegated: Thames
- Folded: Wigan Borough
- New Clubs in League: Mansfield Town, Chester City

The 1931–32 season was the 40th season of The Football League.

== Final league tables ==
The tables and results below are reproduced here in the exact form that they can be found at The Rec.Sport.Soccer Statistics Foundation website and in Rothmans Book of Football League Records 1888–89 to 1978–79, with home and away statistics separated.

Starting with the 1894–95 season, clubs that finished level on points were separated by goal average (goals scored divided by goals conceded), more accurately referred to as goal ratio. If one or more teams had the same goal average, the system favored teams that had conceded fewer goals. The goal average system was eventually discontinued beginning with the 1976–77 season. From the 1922–23 season onward, re-election was required for the bottom two teams in both the Third Division North and Third Division South.

== First Division ==
First Division
- Season: 1931–32
- Champions: Everton; 4th English title
- Relegated: Grimsby Town; West Ham United
- Matches: 462
- Goals: 1,727 (3.74 per match)
- Top goalscorer: Dixie Dean (44 goals)
- Biggest home win: Everton 8–1 Newcastle United (31 October 1931); Everton 9–2 Leicester City (28 November 1931); Bolton Wanderers 8–1 Liverpool (7 March 1932)
- Biggest away win: Blackburn Rovers 1–6 Sheffield Wednesday (29 April 1932)
- Highest scoring: Everton 9–3 Sheffield Wednesday (17 October 1931)

Pos	Team	Pld	W	D	L	GF	GA	GAv	Pts	Relegation
1	Everton (C)	42	26	4	12	116	64	1.813	56	
2	Arsenal	42	22	10	10	90	48	1.875	54	
3	Sheffield Wednesday	42	22	6	14	96	82	1.171	50	
4	Huddersfield Town	42	19	10	13	80	63	1.270	48	
5	Aston Villa	42	19	8	15	104	72	1.444	46	
6	West Bromwich Albion	42	20	6	16	77	55	1.400	46	
7	Sheffield United	42	20	6	16	80	75	1.067	46	
8	Portsmouth	42	19	7	16	62	62	1.000	45	
9	Birmingham	42	18	8	16	78	67	1.164	44	
10	Liverpool	42	19	6	17	81	93	0.871	44	
11	Newcastle United	42	18	6	18	80	87	0.920	42	
12	Chelsea	42	16	8	18	69	73	0.945	40	
13	Sunderland	42	15	10	17	67	73	0.918	40	
14	Manchester City	42	13	12	17	83	73	1.137	38	
15	Derby County	42	14	10	18	71	75	0.947	38	
16	Blackburn Rovers	42	16	6	20	89	95	0.937	38	
17	Bolton Wanderers	42	17	4	21	72	80	0.900	38	
18	Middlesbrough	42	15	8	19	64	89	0.719	38	
19	Leicester City	42	15	7	20	74	94	0.787	37	
20	Blackpool	42	12	9	21	65	102	0.637	33	
21	Grimsby Town (R)	42	13	6	23	67	98	0.684	32	Relegation to the Second Division
22	West Ham United (R)	42	12	7	23	62	107	0.579	31	Relegation to the Second Division

Source: World Football
Rules for classification: 1) Points; 2) Goal average; 3) Goals scored
(C) Champions; (R) Relegated

=== Results ===
Home \ Away	ARS	AST	BIR	BLB	BLP	BOL	CHE	DER	EVE	GRI	HUD	LEI	LIV	MCI	MID	NEW	POR	SHU	SHW	SUN	WBA	WHU
Arsenal		1–1	3–0	4–0	2–0	1–1	1–1	2–1	3–2	4–0	1–1	2–1	6–0	4–0	5–0	1–0	3–3	0–2	3–1	2–0	0–1	4–1
Aston Villa	1–1		3–2	1–5	5–1	2–1	1–3	2–0	2–3	7–0	2–3	3–2	6–1	2–1	7–1	3–0	0–1	5–0	3–1	2–0	2–0	5–2
Birmingham	2–2	1–1		2–1	3–0	2–2	4–0	1–1	4–0	2–1	5–0	2–0	3–1	1–5	3–0	4–1	2–1	1–3	1–2	0–0	1–0	4–1
Blackburn Rovers	1–1	2–0	1–2		5–1	3–1	2–2	3–2	5–3	3–2	3–0	6–0	1–3	2–2	4–2	0–3	5–3	1–2	1–6	5–2	2–0	2–4
Blackpool	1–5	1–3	1–1	2–1		0–3	2–4	2–1	2–0	4–3	2–0	2–3	2–2	2–2	1–2	3–1	1–1	2–0	1–2	3–2	1–2	7–2
Bolton Wanderers	1–0	2–1	5–1	3–1	1–2		1–0	1–2	2–1	5–3	1–2	1–0	8–1	1–1	4–2	2–1	4–0	3–1	2–4	3–1	1–0	0–1
Chelsea	2–1	3–6	2–1	1–2	4–1	3–0		2–1	0–0	4–1	0–1	1–0	2–0	3–2	4–0	4–1	0–0	1–1	2–3	2–2	0–2	3–2
Derby County	1–1	3–1	2–1	1–1	5–0	5–1	1–0		3–0	3–3	3–2	1–1	1–2	2–1	5–2	1–1	2–1	1–3	0–1	3–1	3–1	5–1
Everton	1–3	4–2	3–2	5–0	3–2	1–0	7–2	2–1		4–2	4–1	9–2	2–1	0–1	5–1	8–1	0–1	5–1	9–3	4–2	2–1	6–1
Grimsby Town	3–1	2–2	1–1	4–3	0–0	2–0	1–2	2–1	1–2		1–4	3–0	5–1	2–1	2–0	1–2	3–1	0–2	3–1	1–3	0–0	2–1
Huddersfield Town	1–2	1–1	1–1	1–1	5–0	2–0	2–1	6–0	0–0	1–1		2–1	4–3	1–0	1–1	1–2	1–0	2–2	6–1	4–1	2–2	3–1
Leicester City	1–2	3–8	3–1	1–0	2–2	1–3	1–0	1–1	0–1	1–2	2–4		2–1	4–0	2–2	4–2	2–1	4–3	3–2	5–0	2–3	2–1
Liverpool	2–1	2–0	4–3	4–2	3–2	2–2	2–1	1–1	1–3	4–0	0–3	3–3		4–3	7–2	4–2	1–3	2–1	3–1	1–2	4–1	2–2
Manchester City	1–3	3–3	2–1	3–1	7–1	2–1	1–1	3–0	1–0	4–1	3–0	5–1	0–1		1–2	5–1	3–3	1–1	1–2	1–1	2–5	0–1
Middlesbrough	2–5	1–1	2–0	0–2	0–3	3–1	0–2	5–2	1–0	4–0	1–0	1–1	4–1	3–3		2–1	0–1	4–3	4–0	0–1	1–0	3–2
Newcastle United	3–2	3–1	0–3	5–3	2–2	3–1	4–1	3–3	0–0	2–0	2–1	3–2	0–1	2–1	3–1		0–0	5–3	4–1	1–2	5–1	2–2
Portsmouth	0–3	0–3	2–1	2–0	2–2	3–2	1–0	2–0	0–3	2–0	3–2	0–1	2–0	3–2	2–0	6–0		2–1	2–0	0–0	0–1	3–0
Sheffield United	4–1	5–4	1–0	3–2	1–3	4–0	4–2	3–1	1–5	2–1	0–2	2–2	3–0	2–1	2–1	0–3	1–2		1–1	1–1	1–0	6–0
Sheffield Wednesday	1–3	1–0	5–1	5–1	3–0	7–1	2–2	3–1	1–3	4–1	4–1	3–1	1–1	1–1	1–1	2–0	3–1	2–1		3–2	2–5	6–1
Sunderland	2–0	1–1	2–3	2–2	4–0	3–0	2–1	0–0	2–3	2–0	1–3	4–1	1–3	2–5	0–0	1–4	5–1	1–0	3–1		2–1	2–0
West Bromwich Albion	1–0	3–0	0–1	4–1	4–0	3–0	4–0	4–0	1–1	5–6	3–2	1–2	1–2	1–1	1–1	2–1	3–0	0–1	1–1	1–0		3–1
West Ham United	1–1	2–1	2–4	1–3	1–1	3–1	3–1	2–1	4–2	3–1	1–1	1–4	1–0	1–1	0–2	2–1	2–1	1–2	1–2	2–2	1–5	

Updated to match(es) played on unknown. Source:
Legend: Blue = home team win; Yellow = draw; Red = away team win.
- West Bromwich Albion were 4-0 up against West Ham on the 7th of November 1931 after just 9 minutes of play, with W.G. Richardson scoring 4 goals in 5 minutes. They won the match 5-1.

=== Maps ===
Locations of the Football League First Division London teams
Locations of the Football League First Division teams

== Second Division ==
Second Division
- Season: 1931–32
- Champions: Wolverhampton Wanderers
- Promoted: Wolverhampton Wanderers; Leeds United
- Relegated: Barnsley; Bristol City
- Matches: 462
- Goals: 1,567 (3.39 per match)
- Top goalscorer: Cyril Pearce (35 goals)
- Biggest home win: Bradford City 9–1 Barnsley (2 January 1932)
- Biggest away win: Southampton 0–6 Plymouth Argyle (5 December 1931); Port Vale 1–7 Wolverhampton Wanderers (12 December 1931)
- Highest scoring: Tottenham Hotspur 9–3 Port Vale (21 November 1931)

Pos	Team	Pld	W	D	L	GF	GA	GAv	Pts	Promotion or relegation
1	Wolverhampton Wanderers (C, P)	42	24	8	10	115	49	2.347	56	Promotion to the First Division
2	Leeds United (P)	42	22	10	10	78	54	1.444	54	Promotion to the First Division
3	Stoke City	42	19	14	9	69	48	1.438	52	
4	Plymouth Argyle	42	20	9	13	100	66	1.515	49	
5	Bury	42	21	7	14	70	58	1.207	49	
6	Bradford (Park Avenue)	42	21	7	14	72	63	1.143	49	
7	Bradford City	42	16	13	13	80	61	1.311	45	
8	Tottenham Hotspur	42	16	11	15	87	78	1.115	43	
9	Millwall	42	17	9	16	61	61	1.000	43	
10	Charlton Athletic	42	17	9	16	61	66	0.924	43	
11	Nottingham Forest	42	16	10	16	77	72	1.069	42	
12	Manchester United	42	17	8	17	71	72	0.986	42	
13	Preston North End	42	16	10	16	75	77	0.974	42	
14	Southampton	42	17	7	18	66	77	0.857	41	
15	Swansea Town	42	16	7	19	73	75	0.973	39	
16	Notts County	42	13	12	17	75	75	1.000	38	
17	Chesterfield	42	13	11	18	64	86	0.744	37	
18	Oldham Athletic	42	13	10	19	62	84	0.738	36	
19	Burnley	42	13	9	20	59	87	0.678	35	
20	Port Vale	42	13	7	22	58	89	0.652	33	
21	Barnsley (R)	42	12	9	21	55	91	0.604	33	Relegation to the Third Division North
22	Bristol City (R)	42	6	11	25	39	78	0.500	23	Relegation to the Third Division South

Rules for classification: 1) Points; 2) Goal average; 3) Goals scored
(C) Champions; (P) Promoted; (R) Relegated

=== Results ===
Home \ Away	BAR	BRA	BPA	BRI	BUR	BRY	CHA	CHF	LEE	MUN	MIL	NOT	NTC	OLD	PLY	PTV	PNE	SOU	STK	SWA	TOT	WOL
Barnsley		1–2	2–2	1–1	0–1	0–1	1–4	3–1	0–2	0–0	2–1	3–1	1–1	3–1	0–0	3–0	4–2	3–3	1–0	2–3	3–2	2–2
Bradford City	9–1		0–0	3–0	1–2	1–3	1–1	3–0	4–1	4–3	0–0	2–2	0–2	2–0	3–3	4–0	0–1	5–2	2–2	5–1	2–0	2–2
Bradford Park Avenue	1–0	1–0		2–0	2–0	2–1	3–0	1–0	3–0	3–1	1–2	4–1	1–1	5–0	2–0	2–2	1–5	2–1	2–1	2–1	2–1	2–1
Bristol City	4–0	0–1	0–0		1–6	1–3	1–2	1–1	0–2	2–1	1–4	1–1	3–2	1–1	0–2	0–2	4–2	0–1	0–0	1–1	1–1	0–4
Burnley	5–3	1–1	3–2	1–2		2–2	0–1	2–2	0–5	2–0	1–1	1–0	1–1	1–4	1–1	2–2	2–2	1–3	3–0	4–1	2–0	1–3
Bury	7–1	0–2	4–2	2–1	1–0		6–0	0–1	1–4	0–0	2–0	2–2	2–1	2–1	2–2	2–0	4–1	3–0	0–1	2–1	1–1	1–0
Charlton Athletic	3–1	1–0	2–2	2–0	0–1	3–0		0–0	0–1	1–0	1–3	3–1	3–1	2–2	2–0	2–1	2–1	2–3	1–1	3–3	2–5	3–2
Chesterfield	2–2	2–2	3–2	3–1	5–1	4–1	3–2		1–1	1–3	1–0	1–0	1–4	0–2	1–2	4–0	3–1	1–0	1–3	1–2	4–2	1–2
Leeds United	0–1	1–1	3–2	1–0	3–1	1–0	2–0	3–3		1–4	0–1	1–1	2–2	5–0	0–0	0–2	4–1	1–0	2–0	3–2	1–0	2–1
Manchester United	3–0	1–0	0–2	0–1	5–1	1–2	0–2	3–1	2–5		2–0	3–2	3–3	5–1	2–1	2–0	3–2	2–3	1–1	2–1	1–1	3–2
Millwall	2–0	6–1	3–0	1–0	2–0	2–1	1–0	5–0	2–3	1–1		1–0	4–3	0–0	1–3	2–2	4–1	0–1	1–0	3–1	1–2	1–2
Nottingham Forest	1–2	2–1	6–1	3–1	1–2	0–2	3–2	4–0	3–3	2–1	1–1		2–1	2–0	3–2	2–1	2–2	2–0	1–1	6–1	1–3	2–0
Notts County	2–3	1–1	0–2	3–0	5–0	0–1	2–2	1–1	1–1	1–2	2–0	2–6		1–0	3–0	4–2	1–4	5–0	2–1	1–2	3–1	3–1
Oldham Athletic	2–2	1–1	2–1	2–1	3–1	1–2	1–0	6–1	2–1	1–5	1–1	2–4	5–2		1–3	3–0	2–2	2–0	1–3	2–0	1–2	0–2
Plymouth Argyle	3–0	3–3	4–1	2–1	4–0	5–1	1–1	4–0	3–2	3–1	8–1	5–1	3–4	5–0		1–3	2–1	1–2	1–1	4–2	4–1	3–3
Port Vale	3–0	2–0	1–3	4–2	1–3	1–1	0–1	2–1	1–2	1–2	2–2	2–0	2–0	1–1	2–0		0–1	0–0	3–0	0–4	1–3	1–7
Preston North End	1–2	5–2	1–0	1–1	2–1	0–2	3–2	2–2	0–0	0–0	2–0	1–1	0–0	2–3	5–2	1–4		2–1	2–0	1–0	2–0	4–2
Southampton	2–0	0–1	0–3	1–1	3–0	2–1	1–1	1–2	2–1	1–1	3–1	4–0	3–1	1–1	0–6	5–1	3–3		1–2	3–0	2–1	1–3
Stoke City	2–0	3–1	1–0	1–1	3–0	3–2	4–0	2–1	3–4	3–0	0–0	2–1	2–2	1–1	3–2	4–0	4–1	2–0		0–0	2–2	2–1
Swansea Town	3–0	0–1	1–0	2–0	5–1	2–0	2–0	1–1	0–2	3–1	4–0	4–1	5–1	1–0	4–1	2–3	0–3	3–4	1–1		1–1	1–1
Tottenham Hotspur	4–2	1–5	3–3	2–1	1–1	0–0	0–1	3–3	3–1	4–1	1–0	1–3	2–0	3–2	0–1	9–3	4–0	5–2	3–3	6–2		3–3
Wolverhampton Wanderers	2–0	3–1	6–0	4–2	3–1	6–0	3–1	6–0	1–1	7–0	5–0	0–0	0–0	7–1	2–0	2–0	3–2	5–1	0–1	2–0	4–0	

Updated to match(es) played on unknown. Source: Ian Laschke: Rothmans Book of Football League Records 1888–89 to 1978–79. Macdonald and Jane's, London & Sydney, 1980.
Legend: Blue = home team win; Yellow = draw; Red = away team win.

=== Maps ===
Locations of the Football League Second Division London teams
Locations of the Football League Second Division teams

== Third Division North ==
Football League Third Division North
- Season: 1931–32
- Champions: Lincoln City (1st title)
- Failed re-election: None
- Folded: Wigan Borough
- Matches: 432
- Goals: 1,555 (3.6 per match)
- Top goalscorer: Allan Hall (Lincoln City), 42

Pos	Team	Pld	W	D	L	GF	GA	GAv	Pts	Promotion
1	Lincoln City (C, P)	40	26	5	9	106	47	2.255	57	Promotion to the Second Division
2	Gateshead	40	25	7	8	94	48	1.958	57	
3	Chester	40	21	8	11	78	60	1.300	50	
4	Tranmere Rovers	40	19	11	10	107	58	1.845	49	
5	Barrow	40	24	1	15	86	59	1.458	49	
6	Crewe Alexandra	40	21	6	13	95	66	1.439	48	
7	Southport	40	18	10	12	58	53	1.094	46	
8	Hull City	40	20	5	15	82	53	1.547	45	
9	York City	40	18	7	15	76	81	0.938	43	
10	Wrexham	40	18	7	15	64	69	0.928	43	
11	Darlington	40	17	4	19	66	69	0.957	38	
12	Stockport County	40	13	11	16	55	53	1.038	37	
13	Hartlepools United	40	16	5	19	78	100	0.780	37	
14	Accrington Stanley	40	15	6	19	75	80	0.938	36	
15	Doncaster Rovers	40	16	4	20	59	80	0.738	36	
16	Walsall	40	16	3	21	57	85	0.671	35	
17	Halifax Town	40	13	8	19	61	87	0.701	34	
18	Carlisle United	40	11	11	18	64	79	0.810	33	
19	Rotherham United	40	14	4	22	63	72	0.875	32	
20	New Brighton	40	8	8	24	38	76	0.500	24	
21	Rochdale	40	4	3	33	48	135	0.356	11	Re-elected
22	Wigan Borough	0	0	0	0	0	0	—	0	Resigned from the league and folded (Note: Wigan Borough resigned from the Football League on 21 October and folded. Their record (P12 W3 D1 L8 F12 A32 GA 0.375 Pts 7) was expunged.)

Source: rsssf.com
(C) Champions; (P) Promoted

=== Results ===
Home \ Away	ACC	BRW	CRL	CHE	CRE	DAR	DON	GAT	HAL	HAR	HUL	LIN	NWB	ROC	ROT	SOU	STP	TRA	WAL	WIG	WRE	YOR
Accrington Stanley		2–0	5–3	2–3	2–0	4–0	3–2	1–2	4–0	5–0	1–1	2–2	4–1	3–0	5–2	1–1	2–0	2–2	1–0		5–0	2–1
Barrow	3–0		4–1	4–0	2–1	3–4	3–2	3–1	3–1	4–1	0–2	0–2	4–1	4–1	3–0	1–1	4–2	3–1	7–1		1–0	3–1
Carlisle United	3–0	3–1		4–3	2–1	0–2	5–1	0–0	4–0	3–2	0–1	0–3	0–0	4–0	1–2	2–2	1–1	1–1	4–0		2–2	1–1
Chester	1–0	4–2	4–1		1–0	3–1	1–1	1–1	3–1	2–3	2–0	2–1	2–0	7–2	2–1	4–0	2–1	3–1	5–1	4–0	2–5	3–0
Crewe Alexandra	3–1	3–2	5–1	1–0		0–1	2–0	3–5	4–3	6–0	4–3	8–1	3–2	1–0	5–0	1–1	2–2	0–0	2–1	4–3	3–0	8–1
Darlington	4–1	0–2	0–1	4–1	1–0		2–3	1–2	3–0	6–3	2–1	0–6	3–0	3–1	2–1	0–1	2–0	1–2	2–0	5–0	1–1	4–1
Doncaster Rovers	3–1	0–1	3–3	3–0	2–1	3–2		1–2	3–1	1–3	2–1	0–3	2–1	2–0	2–0	3–0	1–1	2–2	2–1		2–4	1–0
Gateshead	4–0	4–0	4–0	1–2	3–3	3–2	2–1		1–1	3–1	2–1	2–3	4–0	3–1	4–1	2–0	2–1	3–3	2–0		4–0	6–0
Halifax Town	1–0	1–0	1–1	2–1	4–1	0–3	4–0	1–2		2–0	2–2	3–0	0–0	3–2	1–1	3–0	2–2	0–0	1–2		1–0	4–1
Hartlepool	1–0	0–2	2–2	2–2	3–1	3–3	5–0	1–2	4–1		2–3	4–3	1–0	3–0	1–4	2–1	2–2	0–5	4–3		0–1	7–2
Hull City	3–0	3–0	2–0	0–2	2–4	4–1	4–1	0–1	1–0	3–1		4–1	4–1	4–1	0–1	1–0	4–4	3–0	3–0		5–0	2–3
Lincoln City	5–1	3–1	3–1	4–0	5–1	2–0	1–2	1–0	9–1	6–0	1–0		3–0	3–0	3–1	7–0	1–2	4–2	3–0	3–0	0–0	1–1
New Brighton	2–1	0–3	4–1	0–1	0–1	0–0	1–0	1–3	2–0	1–1	1–2	2–1		1–1	3–1	3–1	2–1	1–1	0–1		1–1	0–2
Rochdale	2–2	0–6	4–3	0–3	2–3	1–1	3–1	0–3	1–4	1–3	3–6	3–5	3–2		1–4	0–1	1–0	3–6	0–1		2–4	3–5
Rotherham United	2–3	0–2	4–1	3–0	0–2	2–4	6–3	2–1	5–0	1–2	2–0	0–1	2–2	5–0		2–0	1–1	1–0	3–0		0–0	0–1
Southport	4–2	3–1	2–0	1–1	1–1	3–0	5–0	1–1	2–2	1–2	1–0	1–1	1–0	3–1	3–2		1–0	1–0	5–1		2–0	3–0
Stockport County	3–0	2–0	0–0	0–0	1–2	1–0	1–0	1–1	2–1	3–2	2–0	0–1	3–1	3–1	1–0	0–1		0–1	0–1		5–1	3–2
Tranmere	8–1	6–1	3–0	2–2	4–1	3–1	0–1	4–3	5–2	5–0	2–2	1–0	5–1	9–1	6–1	2–0	2–2		4–1		3–1	2–2
Walsall	5–5	1–2	3–1	1–1	2–1	1–0	2–0	1–2	4–2	2–3	1–4	0–3	3–0	2–1	3–0	2–1	3–1	2–1		3–0	2–0	2–2
Wigan Borough			3–2					2–1	0–1	1–1	3–1	0–3										
Wrexham	2–1	0–1	1–0	1–1	2–4	3–0	2–1	2–1	2–3	5–3	2–1	1–3	2–1	4–0	1–0	1–1	2–1	2–1	5–1	5–0		2–1
York City	1–0	1–0	2–4	3–1	3–3	3–0	1–2	3–2	7–2	3–1	0–0	1–1	4–0	5–2	2–0	1–2	1–0	3–2	2–0		3–2	

Updated to match(es) played on unknown. Source: Ian Laschke: Rothmans Book of Football League Records 1888–89 to 1978–79. Macdonald and Jane's, London & Sydney, 1980.
Legend: Blue = home team win; Yellow = draw; Red = away team win.
- Wigan Borough resigned mid-season and folded; their record was expunged. Their results are listed for informational purposes.

=== Maps ===
Locations of the Football League Third Division North teams

== Third Division South ==
Football League Third Division South
- Season: 1931–32
- Champions: Fulham (1st title)
- Failed re-election: Thames
- Matches: 462
- Goals: 1,694 (3.67 per match)
- Top goalscorer: Clarrie Bourton (Coventry City), 49

Pos	Team	Pld	W	D	L	GF	GA	GAv	Pts	Promotion or relegation
1	Fulham (C, P)	42	24	9	9	111	62	1.790	57	Promotion to the Second Division
2	Reading	42	23	9	10	97	67	1.448	55	
3	Southend United	42	21	11	10	77	53	1.453	53	
4	Crystal Palace	42	20	11	11	74	63	1.175	51	
5	Brentford	42	19	10	13	68	52	1.308	48	
6	Luton Town	42	20	7	15	95	70	1.357	47	
7	Exeter City	42	20	7	15	77	62	1.242	47	
8	Brighton & Hove Albion	42	17	12	13	73	58	1.259	46	
9	Cardiff City	42	19	8	15	87	73	1.192	46	
10	Norwich City	42	17	12	13	76	67	1.134	46	
11	Watford	42	19	8	15	81	79	1.025	46	
12	Coventry City	42	18	8	16	108	97	1.113	44	
13	Queens Park Rangers	42	15	12	15	79	73	1.082	42	
14	Northampton Town	42	16	7	19	69	69	1.000	39	
15	Bournemouth & Boscombe Athletic	42	13	12	17	70	78	0.897	38	
16	Clapton Orient	42	12	11	19	77	90	0.856	35	
17	Swindon Town	42	14	6	22	70	84	0.833	34	
18	Bristol Rovers	42	13	8	21	65	92	0.707	34	
19	Torquay United	42	12	9	21	72	106	0.679	33	
20	Mansfield Town	42	11	10	21	75	108	0.694	32	Transferred to the Third Division North
21	Gillingham	42	10	8	24	40	82	0.488	28	Re-elected
22	Thames	42	7	9	26	53	109	0.486	23	Resigned from the league and folded (Note: Thames decided not to seek re-election and subsequently folded.)

(C) Champions; (P) Promoted

=== Results ===
Home \ Away	B&BA	BRE	B&HA	BRR	CAR	CLA	COV	CRY	EXE	FUL	GIL	LUT	MAN	NOR	NWC	QPR	REA	STD	SWI	THA	TOR	WAT
Bournemouth & Boscombe Athletic		1–3	1–2	2–2	3–0	0–1	2–2	4–1	5–2	0–3	0–2	1–1	3–2	1–1	1–0	2–2	2–2	0–0	2–1	4–2	5–0	3–3
Brentford	4–2		2–2	4–2	2–3	3–0	4–2	1–1	2–2	0–0	1–1	1–0	1–1	2–0	0–1	1–0	3–0	2–3	2–0	1–0	3–0	1–2
Brighton & Hove Albion	4–1	1–2		2–0	0–0	1–1	4–1	0–3	1–1	2–3	7–0	3–2	4–0	0–0	2–1	1–0	2–0	1–2	1–0	4–1	0–2	2–1
Bristol Rovers	4–1	2–0	0–4		2–2	2–1	3–1	6–1	2–4	2–2	5–2	3–1	1–1	3–2	0–1	1–1	2–0	0–0	0–2	4–1	1–1	3–2
Cardiff City	0–0	3–2	1–1	3–1		5–0	6–1	1–3	5–2	0–3	1–0	4–1	2–0	5–0	0–2	0–4	5–1	2–3	3–0	9–2	5–2	2–1
Clapton Orient	1–2	2–2	2–2	1–0	1–1		5–2	1–3	2–2	0–1	3–1	0–0	4–0	3–2	1–3	3–0	2–2	2–4	4–2	1–1	1–3	2–2
Coventry City	6–1	0–1	4–3	1–1	2–1	4–2		8–0	4–0	5–5	6–4	3–2	5–1	4–1	3–0	1–0	5–1	0–2	3–2	2–0	3–1	5–0
Crystal Palace	1–1	1–0	2–0	5–0	5–0	0–0	2–2		3–0	2–0	1–0	1–1	2–1	4–0	3–1	1–1	1–1	3–2	0–0	2–1	7–0	2–1
Exeter City	1–0	4–1	3–1	1–0	3–1	4–3	3–0	0–1		0–3	4–0	1–1	3–0	0–0	3–0	6–2	4–0	3–0	1–1	4–1	3–1	2–0
Fulham	3–0	2–1	3–0	3–2	4–0	5–1	5–3	4–0	3–1		0–2	3–2	2–1	1–3	4–0	1–3	3–3	1–1	2–2	8–0	10–2	5–0
Gillingham	1–4	0–2	0–0	1–0	1–1	0–2	1–3	0–0	0–1	2–1		1–3	2–0	3–2	3–3	1–0	1–1	4–0	2–1	2–0	1–1	0–1
Luton Town	1–0	1–1	3–2	3–0	2–1	1–5	3–1	3–0	6–3	1–3	2–0		3–1	1–0	7–1	4–1	6–1	1–3	6–0	2–0	6–1	0–1
Mansfield Town	2–1	2–0	3–3	0–3	1–2	4–3	3–3	1–1	3–1	1–2	3–1	5–2		2–0	5–2	2–2	1–7	4–4	3–2	4–0	2–4	3–2
Northampton Town	1–1	3–0	0–1	6–0	1–0	4–3	3–2	5–0	2–1	0–1	1–0	1–2	3–0		2–2	6–1	2–4	1–2	4–1	0–4	2–0	1–1
Norwich City	1–2	1–0	2–1	6–0	2–0	3–2	6–2	3–2	0–1	2–2	1–1	3–3	1–1	0–0		2–1	0–0	1–1	4–2	7–0	2–0	4–1
Queens Park Rangers	0–3	1–2	1–1	2–1	2–3	3–2	1–1	2–2	1–0	3–1	7–0	3–1	1–1	3–2	2–2		2–0	2–1	1–2	6–0	3–1	4–4
Reading	3–1	1–2	3–1	3–0	5–1	5–0	2–1	3–0	2–0	4–2	2–0	2–1	4–1	3–2	1–1	3–2		3–1	5–2	5–1	4–1	2–1
Southend	1–3	1–0	2–0	4–1	1–1	1–3	4–0	1–0	0–1	4–1	2–0	1–1	5–2	0–1	2–0	0–0	1–1		3–0	1–1	4–2	3–0
Swindon Town	3–0	1–3	1–2	2–1	1–4	2–3	2–2	3–2	2–1	2–2	4–0	3–2	5–2	3–0	2–0	1–2	0–2	1–2		2–0	3–0	4–1
Thames	4–2	1–1	1–2	0–2	1–2	3–3	5–2	1–3	0–0	0–0	3–0	2–4	6–3	0–2	1–0	3–2	0–0	1–3	1–1		1–1	1–2
Torquay United	1–1	1–1	1–1	8–1	2–2	3–0	3–3	3–1	2–1	2–3	1–0	1–2	2–2	4–1	2–4	2–3	1–4	2–1	2–1	3–1		3–6
Watford	4–2	1–4	2–2	5–2	3–0	2–1	2–0	1–2	1–0	3–1	2–0	3–1	4–1	1–2	1–1	2–2	3–2	1–1	4–1	3–2	1–0	

Updated to match(es) played on unknown. Source: Ian Laschke: Rothmans Book of Football League Records 1888–89 to 1978–79. Macdonald and Jane's, London & Sydney, 1980.
Legend: Blue = home team win; Yellow = draw; Red = away team win.

=== Maps ===
Locations of the Football League Third Division South London teams
Locations of the Football League Third Division South teams

== Attendances ==
=== Division One ===
No.	Club	Average
1	Arsenal FC	40,547
2	Everton FC	35,451
3	Chelsea FC	32,230
4	Aston Villa FC	31,509
5	Newcastle United FC	30,366
6	West Bromwich Albion FC	24,459
7	Manchester City FC	24,173
8	Sunderland AFC	23,131
9	Liverpool FC	22,742
10	Sheffield United FC	20,795
11	Birmingham City FC	19,627
12	West Ham United FC	19,239
13	Blackpool FC	17,478
14	Portsmouth FC	17,478
15	Sheffield Wednesday FC	17,145
16	Leicester City FC	16,241
17	Bolton Wanderers FC	15,843
18	Middlesbrough FC	13,890
19	Blackburn Rovers FC	13,176
20	Derby County FC	13,142
21	Huddersfield Town AFC	13,010
22	Grimsby Town FC	11,968

== See also ==
- 1931–32 in English football
- 1931 in association football
- 1932 in association football
