= 2007–08 Football League =

109th season of the Football League

Football League
- Season: 2007–08
- Champions: West Bromwich Albion
- Promoted: West Bromwich Albion; Stoke City; Hull City
- Relegated: Mansfield Town; Wrexham

The 2007–08 Football League (known as the Coca-Cola Football League for sponsorship reasons) was the 109th completed season of the Football League.

== Changes from last season ==
As a result from last season, these are the changes from last season.

=== From Premier League ===
Relegated to Championship

- Sheffield United
- Charlton Athletic
- Watford

=== From Championship ===
Promoted to Premier League

- Sunderland
- Birmingham City
- Derby County

Relegated to League 1

- Leeds United
- Luton Town
- Southend United

=== From Football League One ===
Promoted to Championship

- Scunthorpe United
- Bristol City
- Blackpool

Relegated to League 2

- Bradford City
- Brentford
- Chesterfield
- Rotherham United

=== From Football League Two ===
Promoted to League 1

- Walsall
- Hartlepool United
- Swindon Town
- Bristol Rovers

Relegated to Conference National

- Boston United
- Torquay United

=== From Conference National ===
Promoted to League 2

- Dagenham & Redbridge
- Morecambe

== Championship ==
Pos	Team	Pld	W	D	L	GF	GA	GD	Pts	Promotion, qualification or relegation
1	West Bromwich Albion (C, P)	46	23	12	11	88	55	+33	81	Promotion to the Premier League
2	Stoke City (P)	46	21	16	9	69	55	+14	79	Promotion to the Premier League
3	Hull City (O, P)	46	21	12	13	65	47	+18	75	Qualification for Championship play-offs
4	Bristol City	46	20	14	12	54	53	+1	74	Qualification for Championship play-offs
5	Crystal Palace	46	18	17	11	58	42	+16	71	Qualification for Championship play-offs
6	Watford	46	18	16	12	62	56	+6	70	Qualification for Championship play-offs
7	Wolverhampton Wanderers	46	18	16	12	53	48	+5	70	
8	Ipswich Town	46	18	15	13	65	56	+9	69	
9	Sheffield United	46	17	15	14	56	51	+5	66	
10	Plymouth Argyle	46	17	13	16	60	50	+10	64	
11	Charlton Athletic	46	17	13	16	63	58	+5	64	
12	Cardiff City	46	16	16	14	59	55	+4	64	
13	Burnley	46	16	14	16	60	67	−7	62	
14	Queens Park Rangers	46	14	16	16	60	66	−6	58	
15	Preston North End	46	15	11	20	50	56	−6	56	
16	Sheffield Wednesday	46	14	13	19	54	55	−1	55	
17	Norwich City	46	15	10	21	49	59	−10	55	
18	Barnsley	46	14	13	19	52	65	−13	55	
19	Blackpool	46	12	18	16	59	64	−5	54	
20	Southampton	46	13	15	18	56	72	−16	54	
21	Coventry City	46	14	11	21	52	64	−12	53	
22	Leicester City (R)	46	12	16	18	42	45	−3	52	Relegation to Football League One
23	Scunthorpe United (R)	46	11	13	22	46	69	−23	46	Relegation to Football League One
24	Colchester United (R)	46	7	17	22	62	86	−24	38	Relegation to Football League One

Updated to match(es) played on 4 May 2008. Source: The Football League
Rules for classification: 1) points; 2) goal difference; 3) number of goals scored.
(C) Champions; (O) Play-off winners; (P) Promoted; (R) Relegated

=== Play-offs ===
Semifinals
3	Hull City	2	4	6
6	Watford	0	1	1
4	Bristol City	2	2	4
5	Crystal Palace	1	1	2

Final
3	Hull City	1
4	Bristol City	0

=== Top scorers ===
Pos	Player	Team	Goals
1	(England) Sylvan Ebanks-Blake	Plymouth Argyle; Wolverhampton Wanderers	23
2	(England) James Beattie	Sheffield United	22
2	(England) Kevin Phillips	West Bromwich Albion	22
4	(Trinidad and Tobago) Stern John	Southampton	19
5	(Jamaica) Kevin Lisbie	Colchester United	17
6	(Republic of Ireland) Clinton Morrison	Crystal Palace	16
7	(England) Fraizer Campbell	Hull City	15
7	(Jamaica) Ricardo Fuller	Stoke City	15
9	(Republic of Ireland) Liam Lawrence	Stoke City	14

== League One ==
Pos	Team	Pld	W	D	L	GF	GA	GD	Pts	Promotion, qualification or relegation
1	Swansea City (C, P)	46	27	11	8	82	42	+40	92	Promotion to Football League Championship
2	Nottingham Forest (P)	46	22	16	8	64	32	+32	82	Promotion to Football League Championship
3	Doncaster Rovers (O, P)	46	23	11	12	65	41	+24	80	Qualification for League One play-offs
4	Carlisle United	46	23	11	12	64	46	+18	80	Qualification for League One play-offs
5	Leeds United	46	27	10	9	72	38	+34	76 (Note: Leeds deducted 15 points for failure to comply with rules on insolvency.)	Qualification for League One play-offs
6	Southend United	46	22	10	14	70	55	+15	76	Qualification for League One play-offs
7	Brighton & Hove Albion	46	19	12	15	58	50	+8	69	
8	Oldham Athletic	46	18	13	15	58	46	+12	67	
9	Northampton Town	46	17	15	14	60	55	+5	66	
10	Huddersfield Town	46	20	6	20	50	62	−12	66	
11	Tranmere Rovers	46	18	11	17	52	47	+5	65	
12	Walsall	46	16	16	14	52	46	+6	64	
13	Swindon Town	46	16	13	17	63	56	+7	61	
14	Leyton Orient	46	16	12	18	49	63	−14	60	
15	Hartlepool United	46	15	9	22	63	66	−3	54	
16	Bristol Rovers	46	12	17	17	45	53	−8	53	
17	Millwall	46	14	10	22	45	60	−15	52	
18	Yeovil Town	46	14	10	22	38	59	−21	52	
19	Cheltenham Town	46	13	12	21	42	64	−22	51	
20	Crewe Alexandra	46	12	14	20	47	65	−18	50	
21	AFC Bournemouth (R)	46	17	7	22	62	72	−10	48 (Note: Bournemouth deducted 10 points for entering administration.)	Relegation to Football League Two
22	Gillingham (R)	46	11	13	22	44	73	−29	46	Relegation to Football League Two
23	Port Vale (R)	46	9	11	26	47	81	−34	38	Relegation to Football League Two
24	Luton Town (R)	46	11	10	25	43	63	−20	33 (Note: Luton deducted 10 points each for entering administration.)	Relegation to Football League Two

Updated to match(es) played on unknown. Source: The Football League
Rules for classification: 1) points; 2) goal difference; 3) number of goals scored.
(C) Champions; (O) Play-off winners; (P) Promoted; (R) Relegated

=== Play-offs ===
Semifinals
3	Doncaster Rovers	0	5	5
6	Southend United	0	1	1
4	Carlisle United	2	0	2
5	Leeds United	1	2	3

Final
3	Doncaster Rovers	1
5	Leeds United	0

=== Top scorers ===
Pos	Player	Team	Goals
1	(Trinidad and Tobago) Jason Scotland	Swansea City	24
2	(Jamaica) Jermaine Beckford	Leeds United	20
3	(England) Nicky Forster	Brighton & Hove Albion	15
3	(England) Nicky Maynard	Crewe Alexandra	15
5	(England) Danny Graham	Carlisle United	14
5	(England) Rickie Lambert	Bristol Rovers	14
5	(England) Steven Gillespie	Cheltenham Town	14
5	(England) Adam Boyd	Leyton Orient	14
5	(England) Joe Garner	Carlisle United	14
5	(Republic of Ireland) Simon Cox	Swindon Town	14

== League Two ==
Pos	Team	Pld	W	D	L	GF	GA	GD	Pts	Promotion or relegation
1	Milton Keynes Dons (C, P)	46	29	10	7	82	37	+45	97	Promotion to 2008–09 League One
2	Peterborough United (P)	46	28	8	10	84	43	+41	92	Promotion to 2008–09 League One
3	Hereford United (P)	46	26	10	10	72	41	+31	88	Promotion to 2008–09 League One
4	Stockport County (O, P)	46	24	10	12	72	54	+18	82	Qualification for League Two playoffs
5	Rochdale	46	23	11	12	77	54	+23	80	Qualification for League Two playoffs
6	Darlington	46	22	12	12	67	40	+27	78	Qualification for League Two playoffs
7	Wycombe Wanderers	46	22	12	12	56	42	+14	78	Qualification for League Two playoffs
8	Chesterfield	46	19	12	15	76	56	+20	69	
9	Rotherham United	46	21	11	14	62	58	+4	64 (Note: Rotherham United deducted 10 points for administration entrance.)	
10	Bradford City	46	17	11	18	63	61	+2	62	
11	Morecambe	46	16	12	18	59	63	−4	60	
12	Barnet	46	16	12	18	56	63	−7	60	
13	Bury	46	16	11	19	58	61	−3	59	
14	Brentford	46	17	8	21	52	70	−18	59	
15	Lincoln City	46	18	4	24	61	77	−16	58	
16	Grimsby Town	46	15	10	21	55	66	−11	55	
17	Accrington Stanley	46	16	3	27	49	83	−34	51	
18	Shrewsbury Town	46	12	14	20	56	65	−9	50	
19	Macclesfield Town	46	11	17	18	47	64	−17	50	
20	Dagenham & Redbridge	46	13	10	23	49	70	−21	49	
21	Notts County	46	10	18	18	37	53	−16	48	
22	Chester City	46	12	11	23	51	68	−17	47	
23	Mansfield Town (R)	46	11	9	26	48	68	−20	42	Relegation to 2008–09 Conference National
24	Wrexham (R)	46	10	10	26	38	70	−32	40	Relegation to 2008–09 Conference National

Updated to match(es) played on 3 May 2008. Source: The Football League
Rules for classification: 1) points; 2) goal difference; 3) number of goals scored.
(C) Champions; (O) Play-off winners; (P) Promoted; (R) Relegated

=== Play-offs ===
Semifinals
4	Stockport County	1	1	2
7	Wycombe Wanderers	1	0	1
5	Rochdale	1	2(5)	3
6	Darlington	2	1(4)	3

Final
4	Stockport County	3
5	Rochdale	2

=== Top scorers ===
Pos	Player	Team	Goals
1	(England) Aaron McLean	Peterborough United	29
2	(England) Scott McGleish	Wycombe Wanderers	26
3	(England) Jack Lester	Chesterfield	24
4	(England) Michael Boulding	Mansfield Town	22
5	(England) Liam Dickinson	Stockport County	19
6	(England) Andy Bishop	Bury	17
7	(England) Glenn Poole	Brentford	14
7	(England) Peter Thorne	Bradford City	14
7	(England) Adam Le Fondre	Rochdale	14
7	(England) Ben Strevens	Dagenham & Redbridge	14

== Notes ==
- Leeds United were docked 15 points at the beginning of the League One season for failure to comply with rules on insolvency. As a part of this Leeds were given their golden share, allowing them to play in League One for the 2007–08 season.
- Luton Town of League One were docked 10 points on Thursday 22 November 2007 for entering administration.
- AFC Bournemouth of League One were docked 10 points on Friday 8 February 2008 for entering administration.
- Rotherham United of League Two were docked 10 points on Tuesday 18 March 2008 for entering administration.
