= Len Allchurch =

Welsh footballer

Personal information
- Full name: Leonard Allchurch
- Date of birth: 12 September 1933
- Place of birth: Swansea, Wales
- Date of death: 16 November 2016 (aged 83)
- Position: Winger

Senior career*
Years	Team	Apps	(Gls)
1950–1961	Swansea City	276	(49)
1961–1965	Sheffield United	123	(32)
1965–1969	Stockport County	131	(16)
1969–1971	Swansea City	71	(11)
Total		604	(108)

International career
1955–1963	Wales	11	(0)
- * Club domestic league appearances and goals

Leonard Allchurch (12 September 1933 – 16 November 2016) was a Welsh professional footballer. Allchurch played in the English Football League for almost twenty years, playing in the top flight with Sheffield United and having lengthy spells with Swansea City and Stockport County. A Welsh international, he was born in Swansea and was the brother of fellow international Ivor Allchurch. He had the distinction of never receiving a booking or a caution throughout his entire Football League career.

== Club career ==
Allchurch began his career with Swansea Town and, having signed professional terms in October 1950, he made his debut at the age of 17.

With Sheffield United manager John Harris looking to reignite their faltering promotion push he offered £12,000 for Allchurch but the deal was rejected. United were undeterred and finally agreed a deal for £18,000 in March 1961. Allchurch had an immediate impact, scoring on his debut and adding a further five goals in the final seven games of the season, helping his new club to clinch promotion. He remained an important part of the United first team for the following three years making over 140 appearances in total and scoring 37 goals.

In March 1965, he moved to Division Four side Stockport County for £10,000, becoming the most expensive signing in club history. He made his debut for the club on 6 September 1965 in a 2–1 defeat to Tranmere Rovers and helped the club gain promotion to Division Three in his second year at Edgeley Park. After winning the club's player of the year award in his final season, he returned to Swansea City where he ended his professional playing career. He subsequently played for Haverfordwest having moved to the club in July 1971.

== International career ==
Allchurch first joined his brother Ivor in the Welsh national team in April 1955 against Ireland. He earned 11 caps for his country.

== Post-football ==
On his retirement Allchurch became a hotelier in Swansea before running a leather goods business. Allchurch died at the age of 83 on 16 November 2016.
