= Harry Griffiths (footballer, born 1931) =

Welsh footballer and manager

Personal information
- Full name: James Henry Griffiths
- Date of birth: 4 January 1931
- Place of birth: Swansea, Wales
- Date of death: 25 April 1978 (aged 47)
- Place of death: Swansea, Wales
- Position: Full-back

Senior career*
Years	Team	Apps	(Gls)
1949–1964	Swansea Town	422	(72)

International career
1953	Wales	1	(0)

Managerial career
- 1975–1978: Swansea City
- * Club domestic league appearances and goals

James Henry Griffiths (4 January 1931 – 25 April 1978) was a Welsh professional footballer and football manager. During his time at Swansea, he undertook multiple roles, including player, physiotherapist, coach, trainer, assistant manager, and manager. As a player, he made 421 appearances for Swansea Town, scored 72 goals, and was also capped by Wales.

He left to join Merthyr Tydfil in 1964 but returned to Swansea as a coach in 1967. Between 1975 and 1978, he served as Swansea's manager.

Despite promising performances at the start of the 1977–78 season, Griffiths resigned as manager, expressing doubts about his ability to take the club any further. He subsequently worked as John Toshack's assistant until his death on 25 April 1978, when he suffered a heart attack prior to the 3–1 victory against Scunthorpe United. The following Saturday, they beat Halifax Town 2-0, securing promotion to the Third Division.
