= Allan Hall (footballer) =

English footballer

Personal information
- Date of birth: 29 March 1908
- Place of birth: Deepcar, Sheffield, England
- Date of death: 1983 (aged 74–75)
- Position: Centre forward

Senior career*
Years	Team	Apps	(Gls)
–	Park Labour		
1926–1927	Doncaster Rovers	30	(22)
1927–1929	Middlesbrough	7	(2)
1930	Bradford City	11	(4)
1931–1932	Lincoln City	72	(65)
1933	Tottenham Hotspur	2	(0)
1933–1934	Blackpool	16	(9)
–	Gainsborough Trinity		
- * Club domestic league appearances and goals

Berthold Allan Couldwell Hall (29 March 1908 – 1983), commonly known as Allan Hall, was an English professional footballer who played for Park Labour, Doncaster Rovers, Middlesbrough, Bradford City, Lincoln City, Tottenham Hotspur, Blackpool and Gainsborough Trinity.

== Football career ==
Hall began his career at non-League team Park Labour. In 1926 he joined Doncaster Rovers and made 30 appearances and scored 22 goals. The centre forward went on to have spells at Middlesbrough, Bradford City, Lincoln City, Tottenham Hotspur and Blackpool.

At Blackpool, he scored five goals in his eight league appearances during the 1933–34 campaign. He found the net in his second appearance for the club, in a 1–1 draw with Bolton Wanderers at Bloomfield Road on 24 March. In the following game, a 4–2 home victory over Southampton he scored once. Hall scored two goals in the return match against the Saints three days later, which the hosts won, before scoring his fifth in the next game, a 1–1 draw with Plymouth Argyle at Bloomfield Road.

The following season, 1934–35, he scored four goals in eight league appearances.

Hall finished his career with Gainsborough Trinity.
