= John King (footballer, born 1933) =

Welsh footballer (1933–1982)

Personal information
- Date of birth: 29 November 1933
- Place of birth: Ferndale, Wales
- Date of death: December 1982 (aged 49)
- Place of death: Australia
- Position: Goalkeeper

Senior career*
Years	Team	Apps	(Gls)
1950–1964	Swansea City	368	(0)
1964–1965	Bath City		
1965	Sydney Prague		

International career
1954	Wales	1	(0)
- * Club domestic league appearances and goals

John King (29 November 1933 – 1982) was a Welsh footballer who played at both professional and international levels as a goalkeeper.

== Career ==
Born in Ferndale, King spent his entire professional career with Swansea City, making 368 appearances in the English Football League between 1950 and 1964.

After leaving Swansea, King spent time in non-league football with Bath City, before moving to Australia to play for Sydney Prague.

He also earned one international cap for Wales in 1954.

King died in Australia in December 1982.
