= Joe Sykes (footballer) =

English footballer (1898 – 1974)

Personal information
- Date of birth: 8 January 1898
- Date of death: 4 September 1974 (aged 76)
- Position: Midfielder

Senior career*
Years	Team	Apps	(Gls)
1919–1924	Sheffield Wednesday		
1924–1935	Swansea Town	314	(7)
- * Club domestic league appearances and goals

Joe Sykes (8 January 1898 – 4 September 1974) was an English professional footballer who played for Sheffield Wednesday and Swansea Town.

Having spent the majority of his young adulthood in the armed forces, Sykes joined Sheffield in 1919, before moving to Swansea in 1924. He spent the rest of his career with the Swans, becoming club captain and leading his side to their first ever promotion as champions of a division in 1925.

Sykes finished playing in 1935 after making 314 league appearances for Swansea. He returned to the club after the Second World War to work as a trainer and a scout, and later caretaker manager.

Sykes died in Morriston Hospital on 4 September 1974 at the age of 76.
