= Cyril Pearce =

English footballer

Personal information
- Date of birth: 28 January 1908
- Place of birth: Shirebrook, England
- Date of death: 1990 (aged 81–82)
- Height: 5 ft 10 in (1.78 m)
- Position: Forward

Senior career*
Years	Team	Apps	(Gls)
1929–1930	Wolverhampton Wanderers	0	(0)
1930–1931	Newport County	27	(22)
1931–1932	Swansea Town	40	(35)
1932–1937	Charlton Athletic	68	(52)
1937–1938	Swansea Town	15	(8)
Total		150	(117)
- * Club domestic league appearances and goals

Cyril Pearce (28 January 1908 – 1990) was an English footballer who played in the Football League for Charlton Athletic, Newport County and Swansea Town.
